= 229th Rifle Division =

229th Rifle Division (March 14, 1941 - December 27, 1941) 229th Rifle Division (December 12, 1941 - July 1945)
- Active: 1941–1945
- Country: Soviet Union
- Branch: Red Army
- Type: Infantry
- Size: Division
- Engagements: Operation Barbarossa; Battle of Smolensk (1941); Operation Typhoon; Case Blue; Battle of Stalingrad; Operation Polar Star; Leningrad–Novgorod offensive Pskov-Ostrov operation Baltic offensive Riga offensive (1944); Vistula–Oder offensive Sandomierz–Silesian offensive Upper Silesian offensive Prague offensive
- Battle honours: Oder (2nd formation)

Commanders
- Notable commanders: Maj. Gen. Mikhail Ivanovich Kozlov; Lt. Col. Arsenii Gordeevich Saburov; Col. Fyodor Fyodorovich Sazhin; Maj. Gen. Vladimir Nikolaevich Martsinkevich; Col. Pavel Ivanovich Solenov; Col. Mamed Osmanovich Osmanov; Col. Dmitrii Ivanovich Pavlov; Col. Ivan Dmitrievich Kuznetsov; Col. Afanasii Sergeevich Pipirev

The 229th Rifle Division was an infantry division of the Red Army, originally formed in the months just before the start of the German invasion, based on the shtat (table of organization and equipment) of September 13, 1939. As part of 20th Army it was moved from the Moscow Military District to the front west of Orsha by July 2. Serving under the Western Front the 20th was soon pocketed in the Smolensk region but the 229th was able to escape at the cost of significant losses. It was partially rebuilt before the start of the final German offensive on Moscow, when it was completely encircled and destroyed.

A new 229th formed in the Siberian Military District in December 1941 based on the 452nd Rifle Division. After several months forming up there, and later in the Moscow Military District, it was assigned to 64th Army in June. In the fighting in the great bend of the Don River in August as part of 62nd Army it was pocketed west of the river and suffered catastrophic losses in its efforts to escape. Reduced to a weak cadre, it was moved to the Moscow area for an almost complete rebuilding before being deployed to Volkhov Front where it served through most of 1943. It took part in the offensive that drove Army Group North away from Leningrad in early 1944 although it was briefly encircled again as part of 8th Army. It served through the summer in the offensives through the Baltic states before being shifted to the 1st Ukrainian Front prior to the Vistula–Oder Offensive. The division was finally awarded a battle honor for forcing the Oder River near Breslau in April 1945, but overall it compiled a relatively undistinguished record and would be disbanded in the summer of that year.

== 1st Formation ==
The division began forming on March 14, 1941, at Noginsk in the Moscow Military District. When completed it had the following order of battle:

- 783rd Rifle Regiment
- 804th Rifle Regiment
- 811th Rifle Regiment
- 677th Light Artillery Regiment
- 729th Howitzer Artillery Regiment
- 130th Antitank Battalion
- 418th Antiaircraft Battalion
- 272nd Reconnaissance Company
- 397th Sapper Battalion
- 610th Signal Battalion
- 380th Medical/Sanitation Battalion
- 339th Chemical Defense (Anti-gas) Company
- 454th Field Bakery
- 672nd Field Postal Station
- 548th Field Office of the State Bank

Maj. Gen. Mikhail Ivanovich Kozlov was appointed to command on the day the division began forming. He had previously served as chief of staff in the 8th Rifle Division and the 5th Rifle Corps. This officer would officially remain in command for the duration of the 1st formation. On March 22 Lt. Col. Vladimir Vladimirovich Gil was appointed as Kozlov's chief of staff. This officer would be captured near Smolensk on July 16 and shortly after created the anti-Bolshevik "Russian National People's Party". He collaborated with the Nazis until August 1943 when he led his Druzhina Brigade into the partisan forces of the USSR. He was seriously wounded while escaping a German encirclement on May 5, 1944, and died on May 14.

While the division had more time to form up than most of those that would be created after the German invasion, several reports state that it reached the front significantly short of personnel and equipment.

=== Battle of Smolensk ===
On June 22 the 229th was assigned to the 69th Rifle Corps, as part of 20th Army, in the Reserve of the Supreme High Command, and on July 1 it was still under this Corps and Army, officially joining the fighting front the following day to the west of Smolensk. At this time the Army was under the command of Lt. Gen. P. A. Kurochkin and the Corps also contained the 153rd and 233rd Rifle Divisions. 20th Army was now part of the Group of Reserve Armies which had been assigned to Western Front and it had been ordered to prepare defenses along a sector on the approaches to Orsha. The Front was now under command of Marshal S. K. Timoshenko; he quickly assigned the 5th and 7th Mechanized Corps, with a total of over 1,500 tanks, to the support of the Army. It was more or less in place on July 2 when it was struck by elements of German 4th Army.

At 0030 hours on July 5, as directed by Timoshenko, General Kurochkin ordered his Army to "prepare and conduct an attack against the flank and rear of the enemy grouping operating along the Polotsk axis." 7th Mechanized was to attack toward Beshankovichy and Lyepyel at 0600 hours and 69th Corps was to be prepared to follow. This counterblow effectively came to nothing apart heavy losses in tanks. By 2000 hours on July 13 the 229th was reported as defending along a line from Griada to Luchi to Bogushevskoe after helping to throw back German infantry from the latter place. Meanwhile Timoshenko was planning a massive counteroffensive scheduled to begin that same day in which 20th Army would destroy the German forces that had crossed the Dniepr near Astroŭna. Given the actual situation, no part of Timoshenko's plan was even remotely feasible. The next day the Marshal modified his directions to the Army; it was now to liquidate the penetrations in the Orsha and Shklow areas by the end of July 16 but this was no more realistic.

In heavy fighting on July 15 the 17th Panzer Division captured Orsha and, together with much of the rest of 2nd Panzer Group, drove the bulk of 20th and 19th Armies, including the 229th and up to 19 other divisions of various types, into an elongated pocket along and north of the Dniepr west of Smolensk. During the prolonged struggle for the pocket the 20th and 19th Armies frequently shifted their forces to counter the German's blows. Specifically 69th Corps defended the western and northwestern flanks from the Barysaw–Smolensk road northward to the Rudnya region. In a report made late on July 23 the 229th was said to be repelling attacks along a line 30km west-northwest of Smolensk. While the German forces were far too overstretched to quickly eliminate the pocket, Kurochkin reported on the state of his forces on July 27:

Army formations: 73rd RD, 5th MC, 57th TD, 229th RD, 144th RD, and a TD arrived in the army at considerably reduced strength... Army divisional strengths range from 4,000 to 6,500 men, and, to a considerable degree, these people were in rear service and supporting units... During this period [July 1 - 25] we received 1,600 reinforcements, while we needed 70.000 men and 9,000 horses.

The report further stated the Army's signal units had only 25-30 percent of their communications equipment and transport. At this time the 229th was concentrating in the Ryasino, Pechersk and Korokhotkino region, 7–10 kilometers (4.3–6.2 miles) north of Smolensk. A more detailed report on the division from August 2 stated that the 783rd and 804th Rifle Regiments had a combined strength of 285 men armed with 13 LMGs, four HMGs, and one 45mm gun.

As of August 1 the division had left 69th Corps and was serving under direct Army command. The headquarters of Western Front was now proposing that 57th Tanks, 5th Mechanized Corps and the 229th attack toward Yartsevo in order to assist Group Rokossovsky in reestablishing supply lines to 16th and 20th Armies, despite the division being reduced to the size of a reinforced battalion. At this time the pocket was located northeast and east of Smolensk and had shrunken in size to 20km east to west and 28km north to south and contained fewer than 100,000 men who were running out of food, fuel and ammunition. Late on August 2 the 5th Mechanized, backed by the remnants of the 229th and 233rd Divisions, were ordered to cross to the south bank of the Dniepr beginning at dawn the next day and take up new defenses from the mouth of the Vop River to the mouth of the Ustrom. Group Rokossovsky had made some limited progress and the two pocketed Armies began their eastward withdrawal in earnest overnight on August 2/3, engaging company-size strongpoints manned by troops of the 20th Motorized Division. There was a roughly 10 km-wide gap between this division and 17th Panzer centered near Ratchino. The 229th was closest to Ratchino of 20th Army's forces and got over the Dniepr there on August 4, running a gauntlet through the corridor, often under artillery fire and air attacks, and fording the river in places where it was less than 60cm deep. As of August 5 the division's remaining forces were assembling in Terenino.

=== Dukhovshchina Offensives ===
20th Army came under command of Lt. Gen. M. F. Lukin on August 6. At 0120 hours the next morning he reported that the 229th, while resting and refitting, was also preparing to operate toward Chelnovaya. A further report on August 15 stated that the entire division consisted of 398 officers, 427 NCOs, and 2,143 men with 1,848 rifles, no submachine guns, 10 HMGs, 32 LMGs, one AAMG, no antitank guns, three 76mm cannon, six 122mm howitzers and no mortars of any calibre. From August 9-15 the main forces of the Army were engaged in an offensive to tie down German forces on the west bank of the Dniepr but the division remained in reserve. On the night of August 17/18 it took over a sector near Golovino from the 153rd Division and was ordered to recross the Dniepr with roughly half its forces while retaining the other half on the east bank. It was successful in establishing a bridgehead and was ordered to prepare an attack toward Morevo State Farm by the end of August 18. Marshal Timoshenko was aiming to cut German communications between Dukhovshchina and Yelnya with 20th Army in support of 19th Army. Without the strength to do more the 229th was reported as "fortifying its positions" on August 18-19.

The division was ordered back to the offensive beginning at 0900 hours on August 22 by striking toward Pashkovo and Babeeva in cooperation with three other divisions. This attack was directed against the 263rd Infantry Division and required a march to a new concentration area by the 229th and 153rd. The 229th attacked near Suborovka on August 23 and gained ground while also capturing 23 prisoners. However, on the same day German 9th Army renewed is general offensive and the minor gains made by Timoshenko would soon be erased. As soon as the next day the division was meeting increasing resistance and was soon forced over to the defense. This was approved by Western Front on August 25 although the offensive was directed to be renewed on the 30th.

==== Battles for Hill 249.9 ====
On August 26 the 229th and 153rd came under increasing pressure in fighting for Hill 249.9. By this time the division had amalgamated two of its rifle regiments into a composite unit, but this was forced to abandon the hill under strong machine gun and mortar fire, digging in on its northern slopes. The next day the divisions fortified their positions while beating off an attack by roughly 50 German infantry and several tanks at noon. Despite the deteriorating situation Timoshenko was still mandating offensive action to retake Smolensk. Near the end of August 28 General Lukin was ordered to form a shock grouping from his depleted divisions while still defending the ground it held. The next day the 229th was reported as continuing to hold near Hill 249.9 with the 153rd's 435th Rifle Regiment under its command. By August 30 it had been further reinforced with two batteries of the 872nd Antitank Regiment and the 127th Sapper Battalion with the expectation of regaining Hill 249.9 and nearby terrain. A report on this date stated that: "One enemy tank was set ablaze in the vicinity of Hill 249.9 on 25 August by new types of bullets." This may be a reference to an early appearance of the PTRD-41 antitank rifle on the battlefield. A further report by General Lukin the next day stated that the division had received 2,500 replacements.

Timoshenko renewed the Dukhovshchina offensive on September 1. 20th Army was now largely facing the 8th Infantry Division of VIII Army Corps and the 229th was initially allocated a reserve role and as a result was defending its previous positions on September 2, and two days later was guarding the Army's southern flank and making minor attacks to pin German reserves in place. Meanwhile, Western Front's attacking forces were making no progress at all and at midnight Timoshenko bowed to reality by ordering 20th and 30th Armies over to the defense to rest and refit while 16th and 19th Armies continued their assaults. Despite being officially on the defense, at 1600 hours on September 5 the division, now reinforced with the 126th Cannon Artillery Regiment and the 1st Battalion of the 302nd Howitzer Artillery Regiment, was again ordered to retake the southern slopes of Hill 249.9. By now it was clear that even Timoshenko's more limited objectives would not be reached. The focus now shifted to the battle for the Yelnya salient to the south of 20th Army while the southern forces of Army Group Center began driving south to encircle Southwestern Front east of Kyiv.

== Operation Typhoon ==
As the fighting shifted to other fronts later in September, and as Soviet mobilization hit its stride, the forces of Western Front were able to rebuild to the point that the average rifle division had 10,500 personnel on September 30, although this includes new divisions arriving from the east. At this time 20th Army, now under the leadership of Lt. Gen. F. A. Yershakov, had only four rifle divisions (229th, 73rd, 129th and 144th) under command.

The German offensive on Moscow began on this sector on October 2. The 144th and 73rd were holding along the Dniepr north of the Khmost River while the 229th and 129th were echeloned to the southeast, facing elements of the XXVII and IX Army Corps. This placed the Army exactly midway between the thrusts of 3rd Panzer Group to the north and 4th Panzer Group to the south. By October 5 the Army's position was becoming increasingly precarious as the armored spearheads began to converge on Vyazma well to the rear. At 1850 hours that day the new commander of Western Front, Col. Gen. I. S. Konev, ordered General Rokossovsky to hand his 16th Army's sector and troops over to Yershakov while he force-marched his command staff and communications to Vyazma overnight. Upon arrival Rokossovsky was to receive four rifle divisions, including the 229th and 73rd, a tank brigade, and several units of artillery. In the prevailing circumstances this was utterly unrealistic; both these divisions and the tank brigade were unable to break contact with the advancing German forces in spite of orders to the 229th to begin to move as soon as possible. During the morning of the next day orders went out by radio for Western Front to commence a general retreat. By now the tips of the German pincers were separated by just 40-50km.

According to Western Front's plans the reconstituted 16th Army was to assemble in the Vyazma area on October 6 "for operations in the northern and southern directions in order to eliminate the enemy that has broken through." By now, however, most of 24th Army to the south had been broken up and encircled by 4th Panzer Group and 4th Army and the pressure of the German advance forced Yershakov to detain the 229th to try to cover his southern flank. On the morning of October 7 the panzer groups linked up just west of Vyazma, encircling four Soviet armies. The division had now reached Zhazhkovo with the task of defending a line from Batishchevo to Chertovo to Stepankovo with a front facing the southeast. Radio communications with 20th Army headquarters broke down the next day and liaison officers in Po-2 aircraft flew to Yershakov to urge him to hasten the withdrawal to Vyazma. Failing this, the Army was to fall back to a line south of Gzhatsk. Under the circumstances these orders could not be carried out. From October 9-12 the trapped armies made numerous attempts to break out, but most were repelled with heavy losses. General Kozlov brought a large group of soldiers and officers from various units of 20th Army out of the pocket despite being wounded. The rest of the command cadre of the 229th was largely killed or captured and the STAVKA finally wrote off the division on December 27. After recovering from his wounds Kozlov went on to command the 33rd Rifle Corps during 1943-44 and was promoted to the rank of lieutenant general but later in the war was moved to the training establishment where he remained until his retirement in 1953.

== 2nd Formation ==
The 452nd Rifle Division began forming in December 1941, at Ishim in the Tyumen Oblast which was part of the Siberian Military District. It was soon redesignated as the 2nd formation of the 229th. When completed its order of battle was similar to that of the 1st formation:

- 783rd Rifle Regiment
- 804th Rifle Regiment
- 811th Rifle Regiment
- 647th Artillery Regiment
- 130th Antitank Battalion
- 227th Reconnaissance Company
- 397th Sapper Battalion
- 610th Signal Battalion (later 481st Signal Company)
- 380th Medical/Sanitation Battalion
- 324th Chemical Defense (Anti-gas) Company
- 586th Auto Transport Company (later 536th)
- 439th Field Bakery
- 904th Divisional Veterinary Hospital
- 1699th Field Postal Station
- 275th Field Office of the State Bank (later 1069th)

Lt. Col. Arsenii Gordeevich Saburov was appointed to command on December 12, but this officer was succeeded by Col. Fyodor Fyodorovich Sazhin on March 11, 1942. More than 2,000 enlisted men were inducted after early release from places of detention. The 229th remained in Siberia until April, after which it was moved by rail to the Volokolamsk area west of Moscow to complete its training and equipping.

=== Battle of Stalingrad ===
In June the division was assigned to 1st Reserve Army in the Reserve of the Supreme High Command, which would soon be redesignated as 64th Army. As the German summer offensive unfolded and the threat to Stalingrad increased, early on July 11 the STAVKA ordered 62nd Army (former 7th Reserve Army), consisting of six rifle divisions, "to immediately move the army's rifle divisions, which are occupying the defenses of Stalingrad and situated in the Stalingrad region, forward and occupy the Stalingrad line being prepared along the Karazhenskii (on the Don River, 18 kilometres southeast of Serafimovich), Evstratovskii, Kalmykov, Slepukhin, Surovikino Station, Farm No. 2 of State Farm 79, and Suvorovskii line." In addition to other reinforcements Stalin assigned the 214th, 229th and 29th Rifle Divisions to defend the line around Stalingrad proper. In the event these orders were countermanded and the division remained in 64th Army, which was under command of Lt. Gen. V. I. Chuikov.

By July 21 Chuikov had deployed his Army south of the Chir River, with the 29th, 214th and 229th, plus the 154th Naval Rifle Brigade and part of 121st Tank Brigade west of the Don. On the evening of the following day he reported that the forward elements of the 214th and the 29th were engaging German forces along the Tsimla River. The 229th faced the 71st Infantry Division plus part of the 24th Panzer Division, with strong air support, on July 25. The Red Army General Staff's daily summary reported:

The 229th RD repelled attacks by up to two enemy infantry regiments supported by tanks against Hills 126.0, 158.3, and 153.3. Nine enemy tanks were destroyed.

Colonel Sazhin was able to bring five of his nine rifle battalions into line, but the supporting 137th Tank Brigade could muster only 35 tanks, the majority of them light T-60s, with limited fuel supplies. The next day the Staff summary added:

Beginning on the morning of 26 July, 229th RD was fighting a stubborn defensive battle with up to one and one half enemy infantry divisions and 80 enemy tanks. By 1600 hours, the enemy captured the regions of the Derbentsevo and Trenoshkina Balkas. The division's forces are conducting a fighting withdrawal to the east across the Chir River.

By the late afternoon the German force had penetrated the division's defenses, but Chuikov managed to patch together a new defensive line using elements of the 112th Rifle Division and the 66th Naval Rifle Brigade. The same source completed the narrative on July 27:

229th RD conducted a fierce battle with the enemy, suffered heavy losses, and withdrew to the left [north] bank of the Chir under intense pressure, where it occupied defenses along the Kaz. [abbreviation unclear] (2 kilometres north of Dmitrievka State Farm), Bol'shaia Osinovka, and Staromaksimovskii line.

The division had been forced back across the Chir east of Surovikino but then put up a vigorous defense which stymied the southern pincer of German 6th Army's encircling operation against the Red Army forces west of the Don. On the other hand a counterattack ordered on July 28 faltered with very little to show for the effort. The division was temporarily under command of 62nd Army at this time but quickly returned to 64th Army, which was under command of Lt. Gen. M. S. Shumilov as of July 30.

==== Encirclement Near the Don ====
Following the withdrawal across the Chir the division was deployed with the 811th Rifle Regiment on the right, closest to Surovikino, the 783rd to its left, and the 804th in reserve. On August 2 the 229th was again transferred to 62nd Army; it was reported on August 5 to have 5,419 personnel on strength. Gen. der Panzertruppe F. Paulus, commander of 6th Army, was planning an operation to finally encircle and destroy the forces of 62nd Army west of the Don, a total of eight rifle divisions and various other forces, as a preliminary to a drive on Stalingrad. Attacking south at dawn on August 7, several battlegroups of 16th Panzer Division smashed through the defenses of 33rd Guards and 131st Rifle Divisions and reached the northern outskirts of Kalach by nightfall. At the same time elements of six German infantry divisions descended on the shrinking Soviet perimeter. Caught between the two closing pincers the surviving soldiers in the pocket had no choice but to fight their way out through German lines, surrender, or simply die in place. The General Staff's summary for August 8 noted that the 229th was defending Surovikino while elements of the 399th and 196th Rifle Divisions had escaped across the Don.

Paulus's army took another three days to totally eradicate the Kalach pocket. The Staff summary for August 9 stated that the 229th and 147th Rifle Divisions formed the "Southern Group", located in the Bol'shaia Osinovka–Buratskaia Balka–Vodianaia Balka region during the morning, and had been ordered to withdraw to the railroad bridge at Logovskii, 28km south of Kalach. The next day Colonel Sazhin was killed in action at Pyatiizbyansky Farm during this withdrawal; he was replaced the next day by Maj. Gen. Vladimir Nikolaevich Martsinkevich. In its own report on August 12 the 6th Army stated that the 229th had been destroyed. While this was largely correct, roughly half of the entire encircled force managed to escape. As of August 20 Martsinkevich's staff was reporting just 278 "bayonets" (infantry and sappers) present for duty.

=== Rebuilding ===
On September 3 the remnants of the division were still under command of 62nd Army. One week later it was reporting just 192 men on strength, the weakest of any division in the Army, and its status was given as "refitting in the rear", as it remained as of October 1 directly under Stalingrad Front. Earlier in the war it might have been disbanded, but since its command cadre was still mostly intact it was instead removed to the Reserve of the Supreme High Command and moved to the Moscow Defence Zone where it remained into January 1943 for a full rebuilding.

== On Volkhov Front and Into the Baltics ==
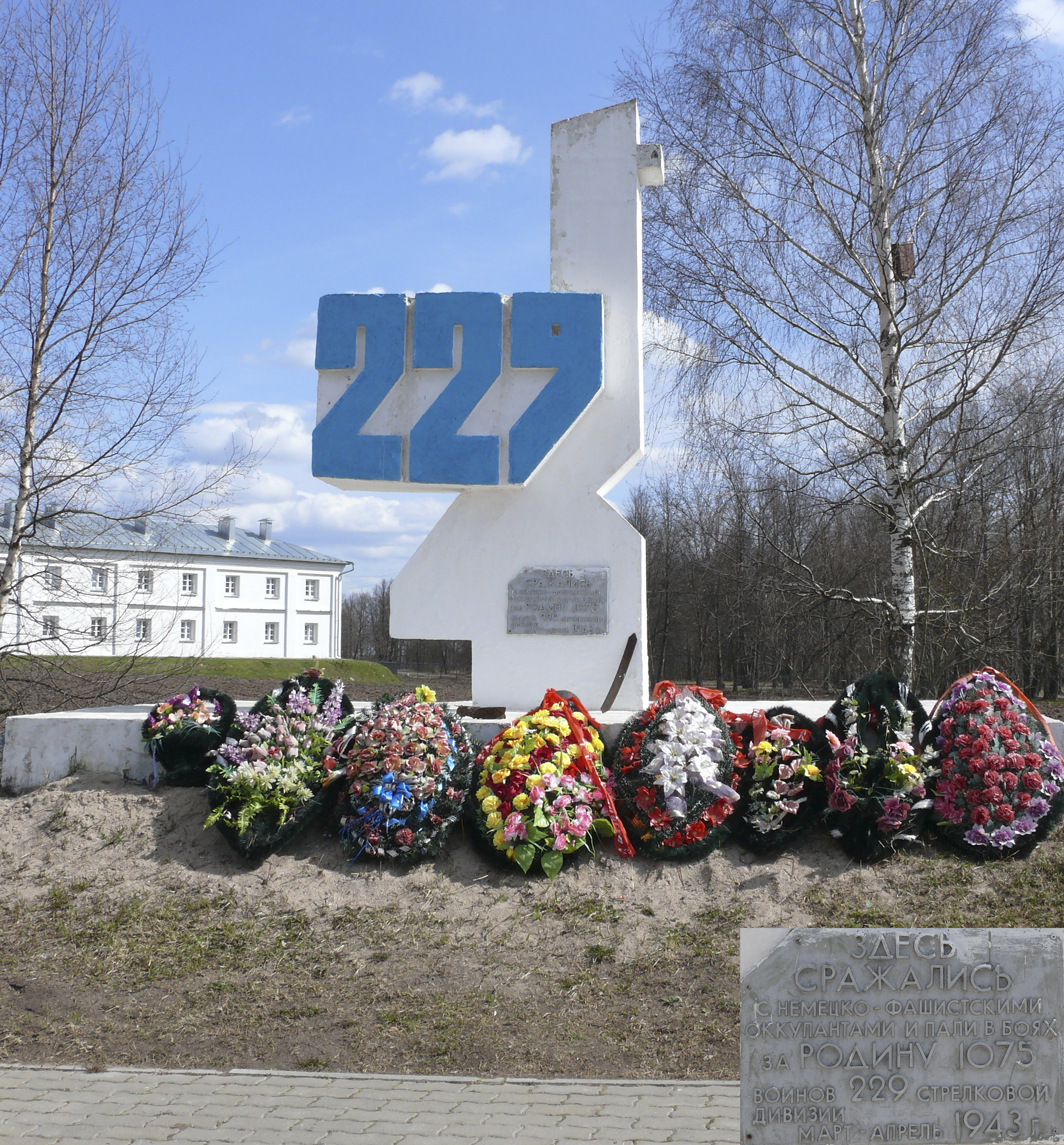
Monument to the 229th at burial site in Khutyn

Later in January the division left the Moscow Zone and at the start of February was unassigned within the Reserve of the Supreme High Command. A month later it had joined 52nd Army in Volkhov Front, near Novgorod, where it would remain for most of the year. As part of Operation Polyarnaya Zvezda the Army was ordered to carry out diversionary attacks against elements of XXXVIII Army Corps. On March 15 the fresh division was tasked with crossing the Volkhov River near Slutka in an effort to capture the German strongpoint at Krechevitsy. Three battalions were able to reach the west bank after a short artillery preparation but bogged down after gaining no more than 700m. The division was then ordered to cross the Maly Volkhovets to seize another strongpoint at Zarelye–Khutyn but this also proved a failure at the cost of 1,075 casualties. In late March, General Martsinkevich fell seriously ill and was sent to a hospital in Moscow. He was replaced on March 31 by Col. Pavel Ivanovich Solenov. After recovering, Martsinkevich received further military education before being given command of the 134th Rifle Division. He was killed in an air attack while directing a crossing of the Vistula River on July 30, 1944, and was posthumously made a Hero of the Soviet Union.

In May the headquarters of 52nd Army was moved to the Reserve of the Supreme High Command prior to being reassigned to Steppe Front, and the 229th was moved to 59th Army, still in Volkhov Front. In June the division was assigned to 7th Rifle Corps along with the 225th Rifle Division. These command arrangements continued until August when the 229th left 7th Corps and remained as a separate division in 59th Army. On September 16 Colonel Solenov left the division and was replaced by Col. Mamed Osmanovich Osmanov. Later in September the division was reassigned to 4th Army, but about a month later it returned to 59th Army. During November it returned to the Reserve of the Supreme High Command where it was assigned to 99th Rifle Corps in 21st Army.

=== Novgorod–Luga Offensive ===
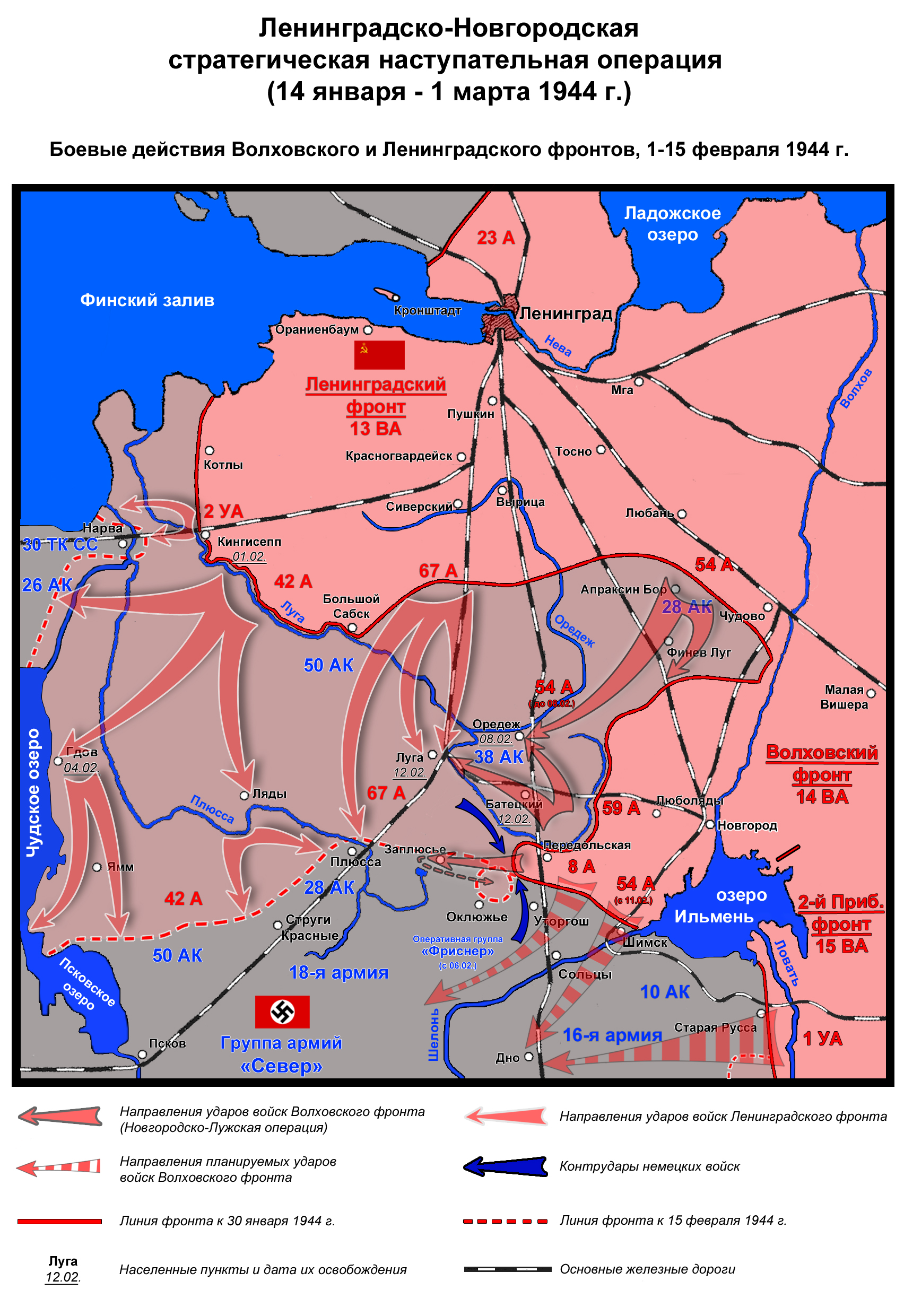
Leningrad-Novgorod Offensive in February 1944, showing encirclement of 8th Army

On January 27, 1944, the 229th re-entered the fighting front with 99th Corps as part of 8th Army in Volkhov Front. The Leningrad–Novgorod offensive had begun on January 14 and Novgorod had been liberated by 59th Army on the 20th, after which 8th Army was shifted south to this region with the immediate objective of reaching Luga. The Army made excellent initial progress, reaching the headwaters of the Luga River east of Batetsky before resuming its advance on Luga from the southeast on February 2. In preparation the 99th Corps was reinforced with two tank regiments. It was to attack westward toward Utorgosh and Strugi Krasnye on the Luga–Pskov railroad to cut German withdrawal routes from Luga. The attack began on February 7 and captured six German strongpoints but ran into stiff resistance from 8th Jäger Division, which had been reinforced with tanks and aircraft, and the Corps was forced to abandon four of the strongpoints the next day. 59th Army to the north encountered stiff resistance and lagged behind causing 8th Army to become overextended and partially encircled by counterattacking German forces. Colonel Osmanov left the 229th on February 9 and was replaced by Col. Dmitrii Ivanovich Pavlov.

59th Army rescued 8th Army from its predicament on February 15 and both armies soon began a rather more cautious advance. Later in the month the 8th was again redeployed, now to the Narva axis, but as Volkhov Front was disbanded the 99th Corps was instead shifted to 54th Army in Leningrad Front. The Front commanded its 67th, 42nd and 54th Armies to capture the central portion of the Pskov–Ostrov defensive zone, part of the Panther Line, and force a crossing of the Velikaya River. This line proved too strong to be taken from the march and the division would remain in this area until summer. In April it returned to 7th Rifle Corps, still in 54th Army, which was now in 3rd Baltic Front. On May 27 Colonel Pavlov was replaced by Col. Ivan Dmitrievich Kuznetsov.

=== Baltic Offensives ===
When the Pskov-Ostrov Offensive began on July 11 the 54th Army was still in 3rd Baltic Front, and the 229th was still in 7th Corps, facing the Panther Line defenses north of the Sorot River. By the beginning of August, after the German line had been penetrated, the division, with its Corps, had reached the Latvian border in the vicinity of Abrene. It continued advancing into Latvia under these commands until by mid-September it had reached the Gulbene area. Later that month it came under direct Army command as it closed on Riga east of Suntaži. Krasnoarmeets Egor Yosifovich Shutko was a machine gunner of 2nd MG Company of the 804th Rifle Regiment. On September 20 he and his crew took up defensive positions on the outskirts of the village of Bershkalny in the Valka area of Latvia. Under his leadership the team beat off a counterattack by sub-machine gunners, causing up to 20 casualties; this was followed by a second attack with support from four tanks. Shutko's fire cut the infantry away from the armor and accounted for up to 16 more sub-machine gunners killed or wounded. During a further tank attack that day or the next he used his last antitank grenade to destroy a vehicle before it could overrun his position, at the cost of his own life. He would be made a Hero of the Soviet Union on March 24, 1945.

Shortly after the fall of Riga on October 13 the 3rd Baltic Front was disbanded and by the beginning of November the 229th was moved to the Reserve of the Supreme High Command where it joined the 55th Rifle Corps in 21st Army. Colonel Kuznetsov was replaced by Col. Pyotr Ivanovich Moiseev from November 5-19; Kuznetsov returned to command until December 29 when the 229th was taken over by Col. Afanasii Sergeevich Pipirev. This officer would lead the division until it was disbanded.

== Into Germany and Czechoslovakia ==
In December, 21st Army, commanded by Col. Gen. D. N. Gusev, was transferred to 1st Ukrainian Front, where it would remain for the duration. At this time the 55th Corps consisted of the 225th, 229th and 285th Rifle Divisions. At the start of the Vistula-Oder Offensive on January 12, 1945, the 21st Army was in the Front's reserve and did not see combat until the 17th, when it was committed to the fighting for the Silesian industrial area. By January 28 this area had been cleared and 55th Corps was pulled back to the Army's second echelon in the area northwest of Katowice and partly began moving toward the Oder River where the Army's 117th Rifle Corps was fighting for a bridgehead south of Oppeln.

Beginning on February 3 the 55th Corps helped lead an offensive to force the Eastern Neisse from its mouth to Schurgast. By the end of the next day 21st and 5th Guards Armies had linked up their bridgeheads, forming a lodgement up to 80km wide and 25km deep and during the following days the Corps captured Grottkau. During these actions the 55th Corps had been fighting in conjunction with 31st Tank Corps under direct command of the Front but returned to Gusev's control prior to the next stage of the offensive, the encirclement of Breslau. A regrouping took place from February 8-12 which added the 291st Rifle Division to 55th Corps and left the Corps holding an 80km-wide front from Oppeln to Wansen; this allowed the Army's 117th and 118th Rifle Corps to concentrate as a shock group. The offensive was renewed on February 13 and gained up to 10 km by the end of February 15 but thereafter slowed significantly due to the presence of significant defensive forces in the area southwest of Breslau. 21st Army would require a break to restore its offensive capabilities. At least some of the Front's rifle divisions by now were reduced to roughly 3,000 personnel.

=== Upper Silesian Offensive ===
At the beginning of March there was still a large German grouping holding a salient stretching eastward nearly to Oppeln and this was the target for a new drive by the 21st, 59th, 60th, 5th Guards Armies, plus 4th Tank Army. 21st Army formed a shock group which was to attack in the direction of Priborn with the objective of reaching Münsterberg by the end of the second day, in cooperation with the 34th Guards Rifle and the 4th Guards Tank Corps. Gusev would commit eight rifle divisions, five of which would be in the first echelon. 55th Corps would launch a supporting attack with the 285th Division on a 2km-wide sector between the Neisse and Rogau and the 229th in second echelon; the 225th would launch pinning attacks against the German forces it faced. Subsequently 55th Corps was to take up the main role in destroying the encircled grouping.

21st Army's part in the offensive began at 0600 hours on March 15 with an attack by its forward battalions, followed by the main forces at 1020. The forward battalions followed on the heels of a 10-minute artillery onslaught and units of the 117th and 118th Corps quickly seized their first objectives; these attacks were so successful that General Gusev ordered the artillery preparation for the main forces shortened to 40 minutes, but this proved a mistake and caused the advance to slow later in the day. Overnight the German forces facing 21st and 4th Tank Armies were reinforced by the 10th Panzergrenadier and 19th Panzer Divisions and during March 16 the Soviet Armies had to repel numerous counterattacks. Despite this, elements of 55th Corps managed to advance up to 10 km during the day.

The next day the 117th Corps' 120th Rifle Division, along with 10th Tank Corps, reached the Neisse in the Rothaus–Mansdorf area, completing the penetration of the German defenses, and on March 18 the 117th and 55th Corps advanced another 15km, capturing 55 towns and villages, and finally linking up with 59th Army near Neustadt, completing the encirclement. Over the next two days the pocket would be eliminated. 55th Corps was tasked with splitting and destroying those forces in the western part of the wooded area between Oppeln and the Steinau River. For this purpose the 229th launched an attack with its left flank along the Steinau River in the direction of Elgut-Hammer and Brandewalde against the flank of the German grouping trying to break out toward Friedland. It was intended to link up with the 120th Division. A breakout attempt against 59th Army's 391st Rifle Division was stymied by the start of the general offensive to clear the pocket. As the operation continued the Front commander, Marshal I. S. Konev, was present at Gusev's observation post on the afternoon of March 19 and issued the following order:

To the battalion, regimental and division commanders of the 225th, 285th, 229th, and 120th rifle divisions. The encircled enemy is trying to break out in the direction of Steinau. The enemy is demoralized and is trying to break out in small groups, without his equipment. I order: 1. To destroy and capture the escaping enemy forces before night. All sergeants and officers are to audaciously and bravely attack the enemy. Do not shame the troops of the 21st and 4th Guards Tank armies and do not let the enemy out of the encirclement...

Before this order was issued the 225th and 229th Divisions had cleared out the western part of the wooded area southwest of Oppeln and both banks of the Steinau. By the night of March 19/20 both divisions had been transferred to the Steinau area to reinforce 4th Guards Tanks.

On March 20 the trapped grouping made a further attempt to break out in the direction of Steinau but this failed. By 1600 hours the 55th and 117th Corps had mopped up the remnant forces in the Erlenburg–Lesthal–Elgut area. With the conclusion of the encirclement battle the 21st and 4th Guards Tanks were ordered to continue advancing westward in the direction of the town of Neisse. After a regrouping on March 22 the 55th Corps, along with 10th Guards Tank Corps, began the assault at 0810 hours on March 23 following a 65-minute artillery preparation along an 8km-wide front. The immediate objective was the town of Bilau, followed by the Bila River. In the day's fighting the Corps advanced up to 10 km and broke into the southern outskirts of Neisse; fighting for the town raged overnight until it was cleared jointly with 117th Corps by the end of March 24. Late that day, in his Order No. 307, Stalin expressed his thanks to the 21st and 4th Guards for this success. On March 27 the 21st consolidated along the Bila and went over to the defense. In a further honor on April 26 the 804th Rifle Regiment would be awarded the Order of Alexander Nevsky for its part in the capture of Neisse and Leobschütz. The division as a whole would receive the honorific "Oder" on April 5 for distinguishing itself in crossings of that river near Breslau.

== Postwar ==
Late in March the 229th was transferred to 118th Corps. Beginning on April 6 the 1st Ukrainian Front carried out a major regrouping prior to the Berlin operation. 21st Army handed its sector over to 59th Army while it took over the sector of 5th Guards Army. This increased the length of the Army's sector to 97km, and consequently it remained on the defensive until after the fall of the German capital. Following this it joined its Front in advancing into Czechoslovakia toward Prague under direct command of the Front. According to STAVKA Order No. 11096 of May 29, 1945, part 8, the 229th is listed as one of the rifle divisions to be "disbanded in place". It was disbanded in accordance with the directive in July.
