= 198th Rifle Division =

198th Motorized Division (March 11, 1941 – September 17, 1941) 198th Rifle Division (September 17, 1941 – April 30, 1955)
- Active: 1941–1955
- Country: Soviet Union
- Branch: Red Army; Soviet Army
- Type: Infantry
- Role: Motorized Infantry
- Size: Division
- Engagements: Continuation War; Leningrad strategic defensive Siege of Leningrad; Tikhvin offensive Lyuban offensive operation Operation Polar Star; Leningrad–Novgorod offensive Baltic offensive Pskov-Ostrov operation Riga offensive (1944); Courland Pocket

Commanders
- Notable commanders: Maj. Gen. Vladimir Viktorovich Kryukov; Maj. Gen. Nikolai Moisevich Martynchuk; Lt. Col. Miron Ivanovich Perevoznikov; Col. Vasilii Danilovich Danilyuk; Maj. Gen. Mikhail Semyonovich Knyazev; Col. Grigorii Ivanovich Sholev; Col. Nikolai Ivanovich Fomichev

The 198th Rifle Division was formed as an infantry division of the Red Army after a motorized division of that same number was reorganized in the first months of the German invasion of the Soviet Union. It was based on the shtat (table of organization and equipment) of July 29, 1941, with several modifications. It entered combat as a rifle division during the Tikhvin Offensive in December 1941 as a reinforcement for 54th Army, helping to drive elements of Army Group North back to the Volkhov River from their earlier gains. It would remain near that river line into early 1944. During 1942 it took part in several abortive offensives in an effort to relieve the siege of Leningrad, suffering heavy losses in one of them. In 1943 it was mainly used for line-holding duties at a reduced establishment, in an area where German forces were strictly on the defensive. The 198th was brought back up to something approaching the current establishment by the start of 1944 and, during the offensive that finally drove Army Group North away from Leningrad, it helped to maintain the offensive's momentum following the initial breakthrough as part of 119th Rifle Corps. It was finally reassigned to 3rd Baltic Front's 67th Army in April after it was halted at the Panther Line near Pskov. In August it briefly returned to 54th Army during the advance through the Baltic States, and after the capture of Riga it remained in western Latvia for the duration of the war, serving under several commands, mostly the 42nd and 10th Guards Armies. It was one of the very few divisions that served throughout the war without receiving any battle honors or decorations. Despite this, the 198th continued its service, now in western Siberia, for another 10 years, before being redesignated as the 23rd Rifle Division.

== 198th Motorized Division ==
The division began forming on March 11, 1941, as part of the prewar buildup of Soviet mechanized forces, at Strelna in the Leningrad Military District as part of the 10th Mechanized Corps. It was based on the 7th Motorized Rifle Brigade. Its order of battle was as follows:

- 450th Motorized Rifle Regiment
- 452nd Motorized Rifle Regiment (both until July 16, 1941)
- 146th Tank Regiment
- 704th Artillery Regiment
- 159th Antitank Battalion
- 126th Antiaircraft Battalion
- 234th Reconnaissance Battalion
- 349th Light Engineer Battalion
- 380th Signal Battalion
- 196th Artillery Park Battalion
- 124th Medical/Sanitation Battalion
- 293rd Motor Transport Battalion
- 100th Repair and Restoration Battalion
- 60th Regulatory Company
- 131st Motorized Field Bakery
- 217th Field Postal Station
- 236th Field Office of the State Bank

Maj. Gen. Vladimir Viktorovich Kryukov took command the day the division began forming, and held this post for the duration of its existence as a motorized division. He had previously commanded the 8th Rifle Brigade at Hanko. On June 22 the 198th was at Strelna and Oranienbaum in the reserves of 23rd Army, which would join Northern Front when it was created from the Leningrad District two days later. As was the case with most of the motorized divisions it was still in the process of forming and was desperately short of equipment, especially tanks, trucks, and tractors. As the Corps' two tank divisions moved south to counter the German advance on Leningrad, the Finnish government declared war on the Soviet Union on June 25. The Front's 7th Army was defending the border north of Lake Ladoga, while 23rd Army's 19th and 50th Rifle Corps, plus the 198th, defended from the Gulf of Finland to the west shore of the lake.

It was moved to the Elisenvaara area on July 2, on the Army's right flank, and took the 41st Tank Regiment under command. It entered combat two days later, mounting a counterattack that drove Finnish forces back some 6–8km, but suffered heavy losses in the process and was forced over to the defense. As of July 10 it had officially left 10th Mechanized Corps. After this the division began to gradually be parted out for spares. The 146th and 41st Tank Regiments were formed into separate tank battalions to support the infantry of other divisions. In late July the 452nd Regiment became a separate regiment in an operational group of Northern Front, and in late August the 704th Artillery was detached to 42nd Army south of Leningrad. In September the remaining elements were combined with two reserve rifle regiments and redesignated as the 198th Rifle Division.

== 198th Rifle Division ==
The process of converting the division was mostly complete on September 17, although the 704th Artillery did not rejoin until December when the division moved south. General Kryukov remained in command. The two new rifle regiments were made up of reservists from the Leningrad Military District. Northern Front had been split and 23rd Army was now in Leningrad Front, still facing the Finnish Army. When eventually completed its order of battle would be as follows:

- 506th Rifle Regiment
- 1027th Rifle Regiment
- 1029th Rifle Regiment
- 704th Artillery Regiment
- 159th Antitank Battalion
- 355th Antiaircraft Battery (until May 25, 1943)
- 234th Reconnaissance Company
- 349th Sapper Battalion
- 380th Signal Battalion (later 747th Signal Company)
- 125th Medical/Sanitation Battalion
- 101st Chemical Defense (Anti-gas) Company
- 91st Motor Transport Company (later 293rd)
- 336th Field Bakery (later 236th)
- 77th Divisional Veterinary Hospital
- 217th Field Postal Station
- 236th Field Office of the State Bank

=== Tikhvin Offensive ===
On November 26 the 54th Army attacked the German 21st Infantry Division of I Army Corps south of Volkhov, driving it back several kilometres by the 29th. On December 3, the attack on the German Corps was renewed, driving its left flank southwards and successively encircling and destroying several companies of the 254th Infantry Division. The 198th and 115th Rifle Divisions then arrived from Leningrad, joined the assault on December 15, and helped drive the Germans back to Olomny by the 17th, enveloping the I Corps' left flank on the west bank of the Volkhov River. During this retreat, the Army's 1st and 2nd Ski Battalions constantly harassed the Germans' flank and rear. In the final stages, elements of three rifle divisions cut the Mga–Kirishi rail line, but the Army was unable to capture the latter stronghold, which would remain in German hands until the autumn of 1943. General Kryukov left his command on December 25; he was soon made commander of the 10th Cavalry Corps, and then led the 2nd Guards Cavalry Corps into the postwar, being promoted to the rank of lieutenant general in October 1943 and becoming a Hero of the Soviet Union on April 6, 1945. He was replaced by Col. Nikolai Moisevich Martynchuk, who had previously led the 294th Rifle Division. He would be promoted to the rank of major general on January 22, 1942.

== Lyuban Offensive Operation ==
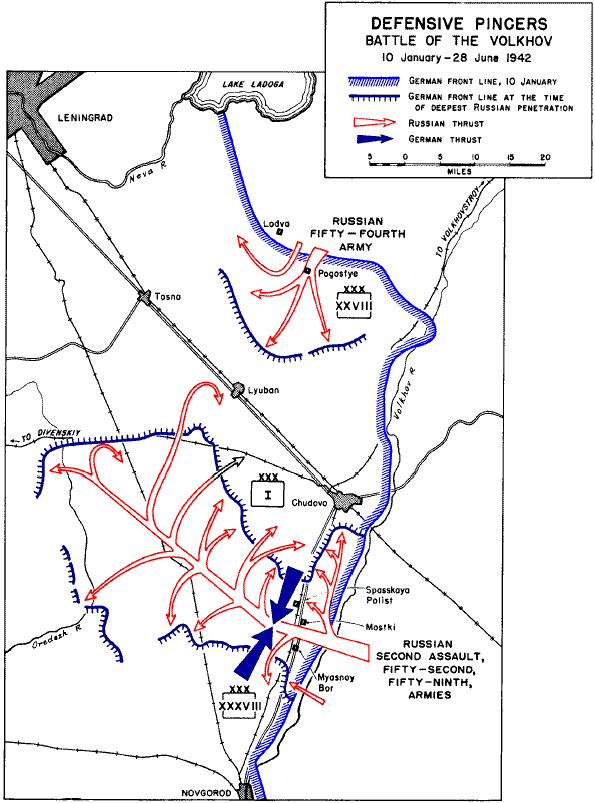
Lyuban Offensive. Note positions of 54th Army.

Having liberated the territory occupied by the Germans in their Tikhvin offensive and caused them significant casualties, Stalin expected his armies to be able to break the siege of Leningrad, as part of a series of offensives across the front. Army Gen. K. A. Meretskov of Volkhov Front wrote:

"The 4th Army on the right flank was supposed to attack in the general direction of Kirishi and Tosno to encircle and destroy the enemy that had advanced north of Mga to Lake Ladoga in cooperation with the Leningrad Front's 54th Army."

The new offensive was launched by 54th Army on January 4, when it once again attacked I Corps, to the west of Kirishi. Forty-eight hours of heavy fighting produced an advance of only 4–5km, after which a counterattack by 12th Panzer Division drove the Army's troops back to their starting line. The attack was renewed on January 13 and the village of Pogoste was taken on the 17th, but that was the limit of success. By mid-February 2nd Shock Army of Volkhov Front had driven across that river and was forcing its way through the swamps towards Lyuban, well in the German rear, but were unable to break out decisively toward Leningrad. On February 26, Leningrad Front received the following:

"The STAVKA of the Supreme High Command orders: after the 54th Army's shock group has been reinforced on 26–27 February, the 54th Army will launch a decisive offensive in the general direction of Lyuban no later than 1 March. By combining the 54th Army's attack with an attack by the Volkhov Front's forces, the fronts' united forces will completely liquidate the enemy's Lyuban – Chudovo grouping and capture the Lyuban–Chudovo rail line."

On March 2, General Martynchuk left the 198th to take command of 3rd Guards Rifle Division. He was replaced four days later by Lt. Col. Miron Ivanovich Perevoznikov, who had been serving as deputy commander of 48th Rifle Division.

Reinforcement of 54th Army with the 4th Guards Rifle Corps made it possible to penetrate the German defenses near Pogoste on March 15, driving 22km southwards to within 10km of Lyuban, but German re-deployments brought the advance to a halt by March 31. The 198th was heavily damaged in this attack, and a report on May 2 indicated it was still "rehabilitating". The 54th Army, while liberating territory, was not successful in linking up with 2nd Shock Army, and the latter army was cut off and destroyed during the following months.

== Operation Polyarnaya Zvezda ==
On June 21, Col. Vasilii Danilovich Danilyuk took command of the division. 54th Army was engaged in mostly local fighting through the balance of 1942. The 198th was kept at a fairly low strength level on this defensive front. One indication of this is that in January 1943 the 704th Artillery Regiment had only two battalions instead of three, with a total of only 12 76mm cannons and eight 122mm howitzers.

On January 12, Leningrad and Volkhov Fronts launched Operation Iskra, which by the end of the month had finally opened a land corridor to the besieged city, but this also did not directly involve the 54th. However, the success of Iskra, as well as the encirclement and destruction of German 6th Army at Stalingrad and the subsequent offensives in the south, led the STAVKA to plan a larger operation near Leningrad, to be called Operation Polyarnaya Zvezda (Pole Star), with the objective of the complete destruction of Army Group North.

The objective of 54th Army was to create a shallow encirclement, in conjunction with 55th Army from Leningrad, of the German forces still holding the Sinyavino – Mga area. The Army was to attack north of the village of Smerdynia in the direction of Tosno where it would meet the 55th; it would then attack towards Lyuban to divert the attention of German 18th Army from the deep encirclement being planned by Northwestern Front once its forces captured the Demyansk salient and its defenders.

The 54th was reinforced before the offensive, which it began on February 10. It attacked the German 96th Infantry Division, which was recovering from the earlier fighting at Sinyavino, with four rifle divisions (166th, 198th, 311th, and 378th), three rifle brigades, and the 124th Tank Brigade, and yet only managed to penetrate 3–4km on a 5km front in three days of heavy fighting. German reinforcements of small battlegroups from unengaged sectors brought the advance to a standstill; meanwhile, 55th Army was faring no better. On February 27, STAVKA ordered Pole Star halted, as almost no progress had been made on any sector. On February 22, Colonel Danilyuk left the division, being replaced by Maj. Gen. Ivan Kondratevich Kravtsov, who had been in command of the 281st Rifle Division. This turned out to be a temporary arrangement; on March 14, Danilyuk returned to the 198th and Kravtsov went back to the 281st.

== Leningrad–Novgorod Offensive ==
The front went back to relative inactivity for the remainder of 1943. At the beginning of October, after nearly two years of intermittent pressure, Army Group North evacuated the Kirishi salient to free up desperately needed reserves. In spite of this, the Army Group was in a very precarious position as the northern Soviet Fronts began planning a winter offensive. The plan that was issued to the commander of 54th Army, Lt. Gen. S. V. Roginskii, between October and December must have looked familiar: a drive westwards towards Tosno, Lyuban and Chudovo as part of a short encirclement, followed by an advance southwest to Luga. However, in the past year the German forces had grown weaker, the Soviets stronger, and the offensive would be launched on three attack axes. On January 11, 1944, Colonel Danilyuk left the 198th again, this time replaced by Maj. Gen. Mikhail Semyonovich Knyazev. This officer had been removed from command of the 315th Rifle Division nearly a year earlier "for miscalculations in command". At about this time the division was moved to the reserves of the Volkhov Front where it joined the 285th Rifle Division to form the 119th Rifle Corps.

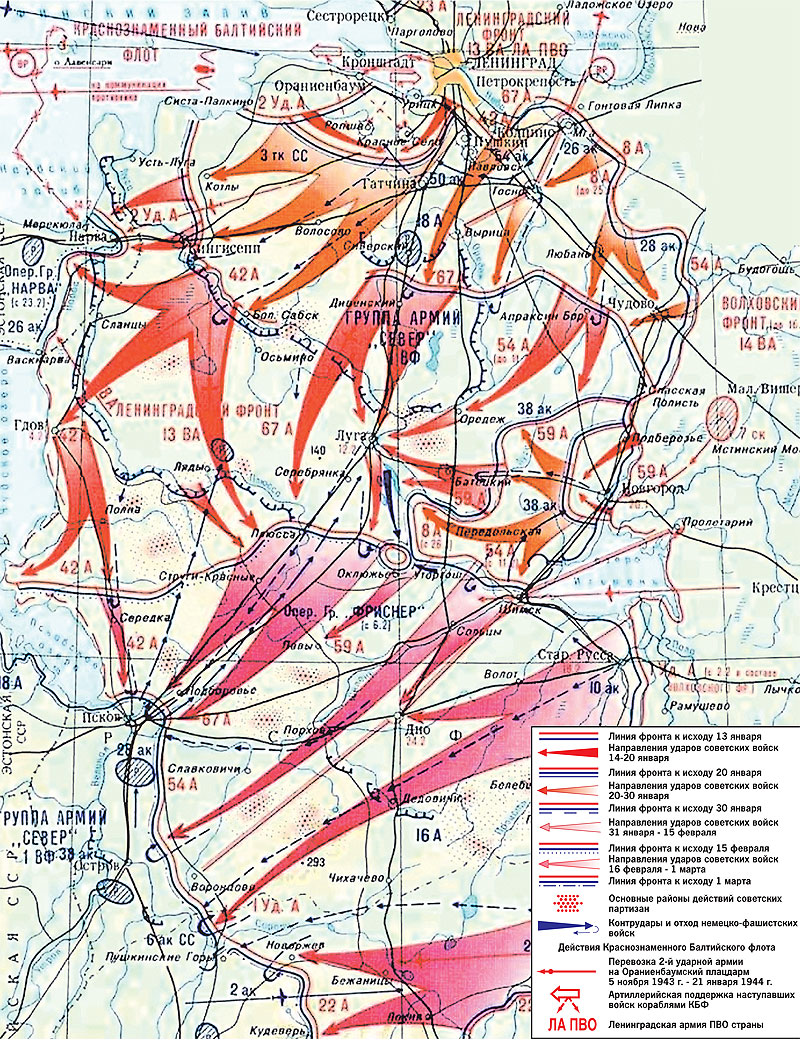
Leningrad-Novgorod Offensive. Note positions of 54th Army.

The offensive on first two of the attack axes, from Leningrad itself and from the Oranienbaum bridgehead, began on January 14. 54th Army launched the third prong on the 16th:

"The enemy, who has to defend simultaneously along several directions, was subjected to yet another assault – the Volkhov Front's 54th Army went over to the attack. The direction of the attack is toward Liuban'. However, the enemy's resistance still has not been overcome. He is continuing to cling fiercely to every clump of ground and launching counterattacks. It is requiring considerable bravery and selflessness to overcome him."

Although the attack had only advanced 5km by January 20, it was preventing German XXXVIII Army Corps from transferring forces to even harder-pressed sectors. In response to increased German resistance the 119th Corps was assigned to 54th Army, which resumed its advance overnight on January 25/26, captured Tosno and Ushaki, and reached the rail line southeast of Lyuban. The next day the commander of German 18th Army ordered his 121st Infantry Division, along with the Spanish Legion, to abandon the town, which was enveloped on three sides, and fall back to Luga. Fearing full encirclement after the loss of Lyuban and Chudovo the XXVIII Corps accelerated toward Luga, with 54th Army in pursuit.

By January 31 the Army was also in pursuit of the 12th and 13th Luftwaffe Field Divisions. On February 10 the headquarters of the Army redeployed to Novgorod, with 119th and 111th Rifle Corps under command, and with orders to penetrate the German defense west of Shimsk and cooperate with 8th and 1st Shock Armies in the destruction of the German Staraya Russa and Utorgosh groupings. Thereafter the Army was to advance in the direction of Porkhov. At midnight on February 13 the Volkhov Front was disbanded as excess to requirements and 54th Army was transferred to Leningrad Front.

On February 17, the commander of Leningrad Front, Army Gen. L. A. Govorov, proposed that 54th and 8th Armies continue their offensive towards Ostrov, in order to breach the German Panther Line in that sector. The army resumed its offensive that day, aiming to take the Utorgosh–Soltsy–Shimsk line by the 19th, which would threaten the German X Corps, but that Corps was successful in holding the line for three days as it withdrew. Following this, the 54th pursued for four days to a depth of 60km before liberating the town of Dno on February 24, in conjunction with 1st Shock Army. Porkhov was taken on February 26, and after another three days of combat and an advance of 65km, the Army reached the Panther Line on March 1, between Ostrov and Pskov.

During March and the first half of April, the depleted armies of Leningrad and 2nd Baltic Fronts were ordered into repeated attacks against this line, with meagre results reached at high cost. Finally, with even the weather against them, shortly after midnight on April 18, Stalin ordered the Fronts onto the defense. The following day, 3rd Baltic Front was formed on the base of 20th Army headquarters, with 42nd, 67th, and 54th Armies under command. In this general reorganization the 119th Corps, including the 198th, came under command of 67th Army. On April 26, General Knyazev was dismissed from his post; in July he was given command of the 43rd Reserve Rifle Division in the Siberian Military District. and was replaced on May 9 by Col. Grigorii Ivanovich Sholev. This officer had led the 281st Rifle Division in 1941, followed by a pair of fortified regions during the next two years before attending the Military Academy of the General Staff.

== Baltic Offensives ==
By late June the 198th was located northeast of Pskov, still under the same commands. 3rd and 2nd Baltic Fronts began their attacks to pierce the Panther Line in the Pskov - Ostrov area on July 8. Pskov was liberated on July 23. By this time the division was operating directly under Front command, and at the beginning of August it was located in the city. Later in the month it returned to 54th Army, where it was assigned to 7th Rifle Corps. During the first weeks of September it crossed into Latvia until it was just east of Gulbene. Later in the month it again came under direct Front command, and by the first week of October it was east of Sigulda, advancing on Riga. On September 4, Colonel Sholev had left the division to take over the 282nd Rifle Division; he would be promoted to the rank of major general on September 13. Col. Nikolai Ivanovich Fomichev took over on September 6 and continued to lead it into peacetime.

On August 20, Krasnoarmeets Pavel Afanasyevich Antseborenko, a scout of the 506th Rifle Regiment, was part of a group trying to establish contact with the regiment's 1st Battalion in the area of the village of Hargile, Estonia. The group came up against a larger German detachment. Antseborenko fought back with determination, accounting for about eight German soldiers killed. Despite this, the Red Army men were soon surrounded. Despite being severely wounded, he provided covering fire to allow his comrades to escape. As his last act he blew himself up with a grenade, killing or wounding several of his prospective captors. On March 24, 1945, he was posthumously made a Hero of the Soviet Union.

=== Courland Pocket ===
For the duration of the war the 198th served under a variety of commands in western Latvia, containing the German forces trapped in the Courland Pocket. When 3rd Baltic Front was disbanded in mid-October the division was moved to 2nd Baltic Front, where it rejoined 7th Corps, now part of 3rd Shock Army. In December, it was reassigned to 14th Guards Rifle Corps in the same Army. 3rd Shock was moved to 1st Belorussian Front later in the month but the 198th remained behind, joining 10th Guards Army as a separate division. In January 1945 it shifted to 42nd Army, still in 2nd Baltic, where it joined the 123rd Rifle Corps. Roughly a month later it was moved again, now to the 83rd Rifle Corps in the same Army. 2nd Baltic was in turn disbanded on April 1, by which the time the 198th was back in 10th Guards Army, still under 83rd Corps, now part of Leningrad Front's Kurland Group of Forces. It ended the war in the same Army's 19th Guards Rifle Corps.

== Postwar ==
In November the division came under command of Col. Yakov Stepanovich Ermakov, and he would lead it until his retirement in October 1946. During that year the 198th was moved to the Siberian Military District, and was located there at the beginning of 1951. In October 1953 it was at Barnaul, and provided a cadre to form the 47th Rifle Brigade. On April 30, 1955, it was redesignated as the 23rd Rifle Division at Biysk. On June 25, 1957, the 23rd became the 95th Motor Rifle Division at the same place and served until disbanded on March 1, 1959.
