= Vladimir Kryukov =

Soviet lieutenant general (1897–1959)

Vladimir Viktorovich Kryukov
- Владимир Викторович Крюков
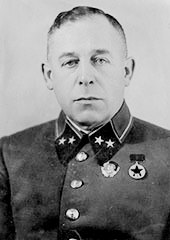
- Born: 15 July [O.S. 2 July] 1897; Buturlinovka, Bobrovsky Uyezd, Voronezh Governorate, Russian Empire
- Died: 16 August 1959 (aged 62); Moscow, Soviet Union
- Military career
- Allegiance: Russian Empire; Soviet Union
- Branch: Red Army
- Service years: 1914–1948; 1953–1957
- Rank: Lieutenant General
- Conflicts: World War II
- Awards: Hero of the Soviet Union

Vladimir Viktorovich Kryukov (Russian: Влади́мир Ви́кторович Крю́ков; 15 July [O.S. 2 July] 1897 – 16 August 1959) was a Soviet Army lieutenant general and a Hero of the Soviet Union.

Kryukov joined the Imperial Russian Army after the beginning of World War I, fighting on the Western Front and becoming an officer by his demobilization in December 1917. He commanded a Red Guard detachment during the early stages of the Russian Civil War, but soon transferred to the Red Army. Kryukov commanded cavalry units on the Southern Front, and continued his service during the interwar period. He led a rifle regiment during the Winter War, and after its end became a rifle brigade commander.

Soon after this promotion Kryukov received the rank of major general. In the spring of 1941 he became commander of the 10th Mechanized Corps' 198th Motorized Division. Kryukov led the division during the Leningrad Strategic Defensive in the summer and fall of 1941, in which it was converted into a rifle division. Between January and February 1942 Kryukov commanded the 10th Cavalry Corps. From March of that year he commanded the 2nd Guards Cavalry Corps. Shortly after taking command of the corps, Kryukov met folk singer Lidia Ruslanova, whom he married soon afterwards. He led the corps through the rest of the war, and was awarded the title Hero of the Soviet Union for his leadership in the Vistula–Oder Offensive and the East Pomeranian Offensive.

Postwar, Kryukov became commander of a cavalry school and deputy commander of a rifle corps. In September 1948 he and his wife Lidia Ruslanova were arrested for looting during their time in East Prussia. In November 1951 Kryukov was sentenced to 25 years in the Gulag, and deprived of his rank and decorations. After Stalin died, Kryukov was pardoned, and his rank and decorations were restored. He graduated from courses at the Military Academy of the General Staff and became deputy chief of the Red Army Military Law Academy. Kryukov retired in 1957 and died two years later.

== Early life, World War I, and Russian Civil War ==
Kryukov was born on 15 July 1897 in Buturlinovka in Voronezh Governorate to a peasant family. In 1914, he graduated from a technical school in Ryazan.

Kryukov volunteered for the Imperial Russian Army in December, after the beginning of World War I. He graduated from a training unit of a reserve regiment in Ryazan and the 2nd Moscow Warrant Officer's School in 1915. From September he fought on the Western Front, initially serving as a platoon commander in the 26th Siberian Rifle Regiment. Kryukov later became head of cavalry reconnaissance (razvedka) of the 57th Siberian Rifle Regiment. He was promoted to the rank of Lieutenant and was demobilized in December 1917 after Russia withdrew from World War I.

On arrival in Ryazan Kryukov joined the Red Guard detachment of Grigory Petrov. In June 1918 he was appointed adjutant of the detachment commander, and then commander of a company. He fought on the Southern Front against the Volunteer Army, taking part in battles in the area of Povorino, Uryupinsk, and several stanitsas in the Don Host Oblast. In October 1918 the detachment joined the Baku Red Army and was relocated to Baku. As chief of a combat sector Kryukov fought against Ottoman troops and the units of Lazar Bicherakhov. He fell ill with typhus and after recovery went on short-term leave. In early December he was sent by the Ryazan military commissariat as a platoon commander in a separate cavalry battalion to the 2nd Rifle Division. In March and April the battalion fought against the Whites in Siberia near Buguruslan, Sterlitamak, and Ufa, and later on the Southern Front against the Don Army in the Defense of Tsaritsyn. In September 1919 the battalion was reorganized into the Separate Cavalry Brigade, in which Kryukov served as a squadron commander, chief of the supply detachment, and assistant chief of staff for the operational section. Later he was appointed assistant commander of a cavalry sotnya (company) in the army depot of the 10th Army of the Southern Front. From May 1920 he served at the Military Commissariat of the Kavkazsky otdel in Nalchik as assistant commander and commander of a squadron. In August as chief of a consolidated detachment of special purpose he took part in the suppression of anti-Soviet forces in the area of Nalchuk and the disarmament of stanitsas and auls near Vladikavkaz. From September he commanded a separate squadron of the guard battalion in Kropotkin.

== Interwar period ==
In January 1921, Kryukov was appointed acting commander of a regiment of the 40th Separate Cavalry Brigade (the 1st Cavalry Regiment of the Internal Service Troops). From March 1921 Kryukov commanded the separate squadron of the 39th Rifle Brigade of the North Caucasus Military District, and from August served as assistant commander of the 82nd Cavalry Regiment of the 14th Cavalry Division. In 1922 he was sent to study at the Higher Cavalry School in Petrograd. On graduation in September 1924 he was appointed chief of the regimental school of the 67th Cavalry Regiment of the 3rd Cavalry Brigade of the North Caucasus Military District. From June 1925 he served in the 11th Cavalry Division as chief of the regimental school of the 89th Cavalry Regiment, and from March 1928 as chief of staff of its 68th Cavalry Regiment.

In March 1931 he was transferred to serve as chief of the 1st section of the staff of the 6th Cavalry Division of the Belorussian Military District. In June 1933 he was appointed commander of the 20th Red Banner Cavalry Regiment of the 4th Cossack Cavalry Division. In October 1937 then-Colonel Kryukov was transferred to serve as a tactics instructor at the Red Banner Cavalry Commanders Improvement Courses in Novocherkassk. During the Winter War, he commanded the 306th Rifle Regiment of the 62nd Rifle Division. For distinguishing himself in the breakthrough of the Mannerheim Line he was awarded the Order of Lenin. In May 1940 then-Kombrig Kryukov was appointed commander of the 8th Rifle Brigade of the Leningrad Military District, based on the Hanko peninsula. In March 1941 he took command of the 198th Motorized Division.

== World War II ==
After the German invasion of the Soviet Union began Kryukov continued to command the division. As part of the 54th Army of the Northern Front (the Leningrad Front from August), he took part in defensive battles near Leningrad. On 12 February 1942 he was appointed commander of the 10th Cavalry Corps of the Western Front. On 6 March Kryukov took command of the 2nd Guards Cavalry Corps, which as part of the Bryansk Front took part in the Bryansk offensive. Later, the corps as part of the 61st Army of the 1st Belorussian Front operated in the Lublin–Brest offensive, the Warsaw–Poznan Offensive, and the East Pomeranian offensives. For his skillful command of the corps during the operations in Poland, Kryukov was made a Hero of the Soviet Union.

== Postwar ==
After the end of the war, then-Lieutenant General Kryukov continued to command the corps in the Special Military District at Königsberg. After the reduction of the corps to a division, Kryukov was appointed chief of the Budyonny Higher Officers Cavalry School in May 1946. He was transferred to serve as deputy commander of the 36th Guards Rifle Corps in October 1947. In 1948 he was arrested by the MGB, deprived of his rank and imprisoned. In August 1953 he was released. On 10 August of that year he was restored in rank before being fully rehabilitated on 28 August. Kryukov was sent to complete the Higher Academic Courses at the Voroshilov Higher Military Academy in November 1953. After completing the courses, Kryukov served as deputy chief of the Military Legal Academy for tactical and drill instruction. On 22 April 1957 he was retired. Kryukov died on 16 August 1959 and was buried in the Novodevichy Cemetery.

== Decorations ==
Kryukov was a recipient of the following:

- Hero of the Soviet Union
- Order of Lenin (3)
- Order of the Red Banner (2)
- Order of Suvorov, 1st class
- Order of Kutuzov, 1st class
- Order of Suvorov, 2nd class (2)
