= Mikhail Dukhanov =

Soviet general (1896–1969)

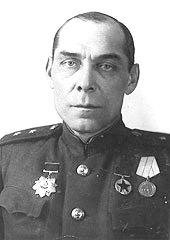
- Born: Mikhail Pavlovich Dukhanov; 14 July 1896; Kiev, Russian Empire (now Kyiv, Ukraine)
- Died: 6 September 1969 (aged 73); Leningrad, Russian SFSR, Soviet Union (now Saint Petersburg, Russia)
- Burial place: Bogoslovskoe Cemetery
- Military career
- Allegiance: Russian Empire (1915–1917); Russian SFSR (1918–1922); Soviet Union (1922–1953)
- Branch: Red Army
- Service years: 1915–1953
- Rank: Lieutenant general
- Commands: 9th Army; 10th Rifle Division; Neva Operational Group; 67th Army
- Conflicts: World War I; Russian Civil War; World War II; Winter War; Eastern Front
- Awards: Order of Lenin

Mikhail Pavlovich Dukhanov, (Russian: Михаил Павлович Духанов; 14 July 1896 – 2 September 1969) was a Soviet Lieutenant-General (1943).

== Biography ==
Dukhanov participated in the First World War and the Russian Civil War.
Later, he was Senior Instructor at several Military Schools. In August 1938, he became deputy commander of the Leningrad Military District.

At the outbreak of the Soviet-Finnish Winter War (1939-1940), without much experience, he was appointed the commander of the 9th Army, which operated at the beginning of the war in the Kandalaksha and Rebolsk directions. On December 22, 1939, after a series of defeats and by decision of the Headquarters, he was removed from the post of commander of the 9th Army and sent into the reserve.

After the outbreak of the Great Patriotic War, Dukhanov was first in August 1941 Assistant Commander in Chief of the Northern Front and then on 19 September became commander of the 10th Rifle Division. As part of the 8th Army of the Leningrad Front, the division took up defensive positions in the area of Strelna during the Leningrad Defensive Operation. In early October, under the threat of encirclement, the division withdrew to the line west of the city of Petergof. From October 4 to October 24, 1941, M.P. Dukhanov temporarily commanded the 19th Rifle Corps of the 23rd Army.

On 6 October 1942, he became commander of the Neva Operational Group, which was converted into the 67th Army four days later. He led this army for more than a year, until the end of December 1943, when the Army administration was merged with that of the 55th Army.

In March 1944, he was appointed deputy commander of the 8th Guards Army of the 3rd Ukrainian Front, a post he would hold until the end of the War.
After the War, he was Assistant Commander in Chief for Military Schools in the Leningrad Military District and retired in April 1953.

== Sources ==
- Generals.dk
- the article in the Russian Wikipedia, Духанов, Михаил Павлович.
