= 286th Division =

286th Division may refer to:

- 286th Security Division, Wehrmacht, Germany
- 286th Rifle Division, Soviet Union

== See also ==
- List of military divisions by number
