= Vladimir Zakharovich Romanovsky =

Soviet general

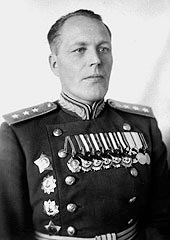
- Vladimir Romanovsky
- Born: June 30, 1896; Veshalovka, Tambov Governorate, Russian Empire
- Died: September 5, 1967 (aged 71) Moscow, Russian SFSR, Soviet Union
- Allegiance: Russian Empire (1915–1918); Soviet Russia (1918–1922); Soviet Union (1922–1959)
- Branch: Imperial Russian Army; Soviet Red Army; Soviet Ground Forces
- Service years: 1915–1959
- Rank: Colonel General
- Commands: 10th Army; 1st Shock Army; 2nd Shock Army; 42nd Army; 67th Army; 19th Army; 4th Guards Army
- Conflicts: World War I; Russian Civil War; Polish–Soviet War; Soviet–Japanese Border Wars; Battle of Lake Khasan; World War II; Leningrad Front
- Awards: Order of Lenin; Order of the Red Banner

Vladimir Zakharovich Romanovsky (Russian: Романовский, Владимир Захарович, 30 June 1896 – 5 September 1967) was a Soviet general.

== Biography ==
He was born into a peasant family in the village of Veshalovka (Old Veshelovka) in the Lipetsk region of the Tambov Governorate.
He fought for the Imperial Russian Army in World War I and for the Bolsheviks in the subsequent civil war and in the war against Poland.

In 1935 he graduated from the Frunze Military Academy. In April 1938 he became Deputy Commander of the 2nd Separate Red Banner Army in the Far East and participated in the Battle of Lake Khasan in 1938. Since July 1940 he was commander of the 10th Army in the Western Special Military District and since March 1941, assistant commander of the Volga Military District.

=== World War II ===
At the outbreak of the Great Patriotic War, Romanovsky was Commander in Chief of the Arkhangelsk Military District until May 1942.

Then he became Commanding Officer of the 1st Shock Army (23 May 1942 - 18 December 1942), 2nd Shock Army (2 December 1942 - 23 December 1943), 42nd Army (14-24 March 1944), 67th Army (23 March 1944 - 28 February 1945) and finally the 19th Army (6 March 1945 – 9 June 1945).

After the war, he was commander of the troops of the Voronezh Military District, the 4th Guards Army (Central Group of Forces), North Caucasus Military District and Don Military District.

From January 1952 to October 1957, he was the head of the Higher Academic Courses at the K.E. Voroshilov Higher Military Academy. Since October 1957 - head of the faculty for the training of officers at the Frunze Military Academy. He went into retirement in October 1959 for reasons of health.
