= 285th Rifle Division =

- Active: 1941–1945
- Country: Soviet Union
- Branch: Red Army
- Type: Rifle division
- Engagements: World War II
- Decorations: Order of Bogdan Khmelnitsky 2nd class
- Battle honours: Dabrowa

The 285th Rifle Division (Russian: 285-я стрелковая дивизия) was an infantry division of the Soviet Union's Red Army during World War II. Formed in the summer of 1941, the division entered combat during the fall of that year, fighting in operations attempting to break the siege of Leningrad. The division fought in the same area until the relief of Leningrad in February 1944, when it began advancing into the Baltic states. The division served in the Baltic states until October, when it transferred south to Poland, where it fought in the Vistula–Oder Offensive and Silesian Offensives in early 1945. The division was disbanded soon after the end of the war in the summer of 1945.

== History ==
The 285th began forming on 2 July 1941 at Kostroma, part of the Moscow Military District. Its basic order of battle included the 1013th, 1015th, and 1017th Rifle Regiments, as well as the 835th Artillery Regiment. While still forming in early September, the 285th was assigned to the 54th Army, also forming to the east of Leningrad. The division was transferred to the 4th Army for its first combat in the Tikhvin Defensive and Tikhvin Offensive operations between October and December.

By the beginning of 1942 the 285th had been transferred back to the 54th Army, which became part of the Volkhov Front, holding positions on the Volkhov River to the east and southeast of Leningrad. In February 1944, the front was disbanded after the Leningrad–Novgorod Offensive ended the siege of Leningrad, and the 54th Army became part of the Leningrad Front. The division was transferred to the 3rd Baltic Front's 67th Army in April 1944. The division served with the 67th Army or the 1st Shock Army fighting in the Baltic states until October, when it transferred to the Reserve of the Supreme High Command. The 285th was subsequently transferred to the 21st Army of the 1st Ukrainian Front, with which it moved south.

As part of the 21st Army's 55th Rifle Corps, the division fought in the Vistula–Oder Offensive and the Silesian Offensives in early 1945. The 285th remained with the army until the end of the war. The division was disbanded in the summer of 1945 with the Central Group of Forces.
