= 54th Army (Soviet Union) =

- 54-я армия
- Active: August 1941 – December 1944
- Country: Soviet Union
- Branch: Red Army
- Type: Infantry
- Size: Field army
- Part of: Leningrad Front; Volkhov Front; 3rd Baltic Front
- Engagements: Siege of Leningrad; Lyuban Offensive Operation; Operation Polar Star; Leningrad-Novgorod Offensive; Tartu Offensive; Riga Offensive

Commanders
- Notable commanders: Col. Gen. I.I. Fedyuninsky; Lt. Gen. Aleksandr Sukhomlin; Lt. Gen. S. V. Roginsky

The Red Army's 54th Army (Russian: 54-я армия) was a Soviet field army during the Second World War. It was first formed in the Leningrad Military District in August, 1941, and continued in service in the northern sector of the Soviet-German front until the end of 1944. It spent much of the war attempting to break the German siege of Leningrad, in which it helped to achieve partial success in January, 1943, and complete success one year later. During these operations the soldiers of the 54th served under five different commanders, most notably Col. Gen. Ivan Fedyuninsky in the winter of 1941–42. After helping to drive Army Group North away from Leningrad and into the Baltic states in the first nine months of 1944, the army was deemed surplus to requirements on the narrowing front, and was officially disbanded on the last day of the year.

== Formation ==
The 54th Army was first formed in August, 1941, in the Leningrad Military District, to the east of the city in the vicinity of the town of Volkhov. Its first commander was Marshal of the Soviet Union Grigory Kulik. When it was first formed the army's order of battle was as follows:

- 285th Rifle Division
- 286th Rifle Division
- 310th Rifle Division
- 314th Rifle Division
- 27th Cavalry Division
- 122nd Tank Brigade
- 119th Separate Tank Battalion
- 881st and 882nd Corps Artillery Regiments
- 150th Pontoon Bridge Battalion

It also contained four motorized engineer battalions, and by the end of September it had been reinforced with the 3rd and 4th Guards Rifle Divisions, the 21st Tank Division, and the 16th Tank Brigade.

Leningrad was isolated on Sept. 8 when the German forces captured Shlisselburg. The next day Gen. G.K. Zhukov took over coordinating the defense of the city from Marshal K.E. Voroshilov. 54th Army was under direct command of STAVKA, and on Zhukov's recommendations it was ordered into the attack on the 10th. This first attempt to break the blockade, the First Sinyavino Offensive, gained only 6 – 10km. during 16 days of on-and-off heavy fighting. Kulik was heavily criticized by both STAVKA and Zhukov for this dismal performance. When the Germans pushed back even some of these meagre gains, Kulik was sacked, court-martialed and reduced in rank. He was replaced by Lt. Gen. M.S. Khozin, a protege of Zhukov. On October 26, Khozin was promoted to command of the Leningrad Front and was replaced by Lt. Gen. I.I. Fedyuninsky, another Zhukov protege.

== Tikhvin Offensive ==
A second attempt on Sinyavino was being prepared to start on Oct. 20, but was pre-empted by the German offensive towards Tikhvin on Oct. 16, which intended to encircle 54th Army on the way to cutting all possible supply routes to Leningrad and linking up with the Finnish Army. In the face of this attack, the army, which had the bulk of the Soviet forces between Lake Ladoga and Lake Ilmen, was ordered to transfer the 4th Guards and 310th Rifle Divisions to 4th Army on October 23. By November 8, the entire German offensive had ground to a halt, due to Soviet resistance and the winter weather. 54th Army had not been encircled, and while Tikhvin had been taken, there had been no linkup with the Finns, and Army Group North was vastly over-extended. A new directive from Hitler ordered yet another attack on the army at Volkhov, but a desperate counterattack by 310th Rifle Division stopped the 8th Panzer Division east of the town.

At this point, Fedyuninsky asked that 4th Army's Volkhov Operational Group of four rifle divisions and one rifle brigade be assigned to his command, which was approved on Nov. 12. While redeploying his forces, Fedyuninsky was faced with a German thrust to his army's rear toward Lake Ladoga. The successful counterattack by 285th Rifle Division and 122nd Tank Brigade set the stage for 54th Army to participate in the general Soviet counter-offensive along the entire front.

On November 26 the army's main shock group (3rd Guards, 310th, and 311th Rifle Divisions and the 6th Naval Infantry Brigade) attacked the German 21st Infantry Division of I Army Corps south of Volkhov, driving it back several kilometres by the 29th. A few days later Fedyuninsky was further reinforced with the 80th Rifle Division and on Dec. 3 he renewed the attack on the German corps, driving its left flank southwards and successively encircling and destroying several companies of the 254th Infantry Division. The 115th and 198th Rifle Divisions then also arrived from Leningrad, joined the assault on the 15th, and helped drive the Germans back to Olomny by the 17th, enveloping the I Corps' left flank on the west bank of the Volkhov River. During their retreat, 54th Army's 1st and 2nd Ski Battalions constantly harassed the Germans' flank and rear. In the final stages, elements of three rifle divisions cut the Mga – Kirishi rail line, but the army was unable to capture the latter stronghold, which would remain in German hands until the autumn of 1943.

== Lyuban Offensive Operation ==
Having liberated the territory occupied by the Germans in their Tikhvin offensive and caused them significant casualties, Stalin expected his armies to be able to break the siege of Leningrad, as part of a series of offensives across the front. Gen. K.A. Meretskov of Volkhov Front wrote:

"The 4th Army on the right flank was supposed to attack in the general direction of Kirishi and Tosno to encircle and destroy the enemy that had advanced north of Mga to Lake Ladoga in cooperation with the Leningrad Front's 54th Army."

The new offensive was launched by 54th Army on Jan. 4, 1942 when it once again attacked I Corps, to the west of Kirishi. Forty-eight hours of heavy fighting produced an advance of only 4 – 5km, after which a counterattack by 12th Panzer Division drove Fedyuninsky's troops back to their starting line. The attack was renewed on Jan. 13 and the village of Pogoste was taken on the 17th, but that was the limit of success. By mid-February 2nd Shock Army of Volkhov Front had driven across that river and was forcing its way through the swamps towards Lyuban, well in the German rear, but were unable to break out decisively toward Leningrad. On February 26, Leningrad Front received the following:

"The STAVKA of the Supreme High Command orders: after the 54th Army's shock group has been reinforced on 26–27 February, the 54th Army will launch a decisive offensive in the general direction of Lyuban no later than 1 March. By combining the 54th Army's attack with an attack by the Volkhov Front's forces, the fronts' united forces will completely liquidate the enemy's Lyuban – Chudovo grouping and capture the Lyuban – Chudovo rail line."

Reinforcement of the army with the 4th Guards Rifle Corps made it possible to penetrate the German defenses near Pogoste on Mar. 15, driving 22km southwards to within 10km of Lyuban, but German re-deployments brought the advance to a halt by Mar. 31. The 54th Army, while liberating territory, was not successful in linking up with 2nd Shock Army, and the latter army was cut off and destroyed during the following months. Fedyuninsky was moved to command of 5th Army in April, and was replaced by Lt. Gen. A.V. Sukhomlin.

== Operation Polyarnaya Zvezda ==
54th Army was only marginally involved in the Second Sinyavino Offensive during August – October, and was engaged in mostly local fighting through the balance of 1942. At the beginning of 1943 its order of battle was as follows:

- 115th Rifle Division
- 177th Rifle Division
- 198th Rifle Division
- 281st Rifle Division
- 285th Rifle Division
- 294th Rifle Division
- 311th Rifle Division
- 6th Naval Infantry Brigade
- 140th Rifle Brigade
- 319th Guards Mortar Regiment
- 461st Separate Antiaircraft Battalion
- 124th Tank Brigade
- 48th Separate Heavy Tank Battalion
- 691 Sapper Regiment

On January 12, Leningrad and Volkhov Fronts launched Operation Iskra, which by the end of the month had finally opened a land corridor to the besieged city, but this also did not directly involve the 54th. However, the success of Iskra, as well as the encirclement and destruction of German Sixth Army at Stalingrad and the subsequent offensives in the south, led STAVKA to plan a larger operation near Leningrad, to be called Operation Polyarnaya Zvezda (Pole Star), with the objective of the complete destruction of Army Group North.

The objective of 54th Army was to create a shallow encirclement, in conjunction with 55th Army from Leningrad, of the German forces still holding the Sinyavino – Mga area. The army was to attack north of the village of Smerdynia in the direction of Tosno where it would meet the 55th; it would then attack towards Lyuban to divert the attention of German 18th Army from the deep encirclement being planned by Northwestern Front once its forces captured the Demyansk salient and its defenders.

The 54th was reinforced before the offensive, which it began on Feb. 10. Sukhomlin attacked the German 96th Infantry Division, which was recovering from the earlier fighting at Sinyavino, with four rifle divisions, three rifle brigades, and the 124th Tank Brigade, and yet only managed to penetrate 3 – 4km on a 5km front in three days of heavy fighting. German reinforcements of small battlegroups from unengaged sectors brought the advance to a standstill; meanwhile, 55th Army was faring no better. On February 27, STAVKA ordered Pole Star halted, as almost no progress had been made on any sector. On March 11, Sukhomlin was demoted to deputy commander of the army, and Lt. Gen. S.V. Roginsky took over command, which he would hold until the army was disbanded.

== Leningrad–Novgorod Offensive ==
The front went back to relative inactivity for the remainder of 1943. At the beginning of October, after nearly two years of intermittent pressure, Army Group North evacuated the Kirishi salient to free up desperately needed reserves. In spite of this, the army group was in a very precarious position as the Soviet Fronts began planning a winter offensive. Prior to the offensive, 54th Army's order of battle comprised:

111th Rifle Corps, with:

- 44th Rifle Division
- 288th Rifle Division

115th Rifle Corps, with:

- 281st Rifle Division
- 285th Rifle Division
- 14th and 53rd Rifle Brigades

Independent Divisions:

- 80th, 177th and 198th Rifle Divisions
- 2nd Fortified Region
- 124 Separate Tank Regiment
- 107th and 501st Separate Tank Battalions
- 48th Heavy Tank Battalion

plus nine assorted regiments of artillery.

The plan that was issued to Roginsky between October and December must have looked familiar: a drive westwards towards Tosno, Lyuban and Chudovo as part of a short encirclement, followed by an advance southwest to Luga. However, in the past year the German forces had grown weaker, the Soviets stronger, and the offensive would be launched on three attack axes.

The first two of these, from Leningrad itself and from the Oranienbaum bridgehead, began on Jan. 14. 54th Army launched the third prong on the 16th:

"The enemy, who has to defend simultaneously along several directions, was subjected to yet another assault – the Volkhov Front's 54th Army went over to the attack. The direction of the attack is toward Liuban'. However, the enemy's resistance still has not been overcome. He is continuing to cling fiercely to every clump of ground and launching counterattacks. It is requiring considerable bravery and selflessness to overcome him."

Roginsky led his attack with 80th Rifle Division and 115th Rifle Corps, adding 44th Rifle Division early on the 17th. Although the attack had only advanced 5km by Jan. 20, it was preventing German XXXVIII Army Corps from transferring forces to even harder-pressed sectors.

On January 25 the army was reinforced with the new 119th Rifle Corps from 8th Army, and on the next night finally liberated Tosno, and reached the railroad southeast of Lyuban, forcing the Germans to abandon the latter. Two German corps were in danger of encirclement if the 54th could link up with 59th Army. By the end of the month, the prospect of trapping the entire 18th Army presented as Roginsky's troops advanced on Luga from the northeast. On the 30th, Hitler finally gave permission for 18th Army to pull back to the Luga River Defense Line, which was already compromised. The following day, 54th Army began pursuing XXXVIII Corps. 115th Rifle Corps advanced 75km in nine days and captured the town of Oredezh on Feb. 8. The next day, in a major regrouping, the 115th was transferred to 67th Army and Roginsky's headquarters redeployed to Novgorod to retake command of 111th as well as 119th Rifle Corps. Once this was complete, the army was ordered to penetrate the German defense west of Shimsk, thereafter advancing to Porkhov.

At midnight, Feb. 13, Volkhov Front was disbanded, and 54th Army rejoined Leningrad Front. On the 17th this new command proposed that 54th and 8th Armies continue their offensive towards Ostrov, in order to breach the German Panther Line in that sector. The army resumed its offensive that day, aiming to take the Utorgosh – Soltsy – Shimsk line by the 19th, which would threaten the German X Corps, but that corps was successful in holding the line for three days as it withdrew. Following this, the 54th pursued for four days to a depth of 60km before liberating the town of Dno on Feb. 24, in conjunction with 1st Shock Army. Porkhov was taken on Feb. 26, and after another three days of combat and an advance of 65km, the army reached the Panther Line on Mar. 1, between Ostrov and Pskov.

During March and the first half of April, the depleted armies of Leningrad and 2nd Baltic Fronts were ordered into repeated attacks against this line, with meagre results reached at high cost. Finally, with even the weather against them, shortly after midnight on Apr. 18, Stalin ordered the Fronts onto the defense. The following day, 3rd Baltic Front was formed on the base of 20th Army headquarters, with 42nd, 67th and 54th Armies under command.

== Baltic Offensive and Disbandment ==
During the following months 54th Army rebuilt its forces in anticipation of a summer offensive. This began to its south on June 22, with the launch of Operation Bagration. As Army Group Center reeled back from the Red Army's attack, a gap opened between it and Army Group North, which the latter could do little to mend as it was under pressure from holding attacks. Finally, 3rd Baltic Front joined the offensive on July 8, with the intention to breach the Panther Line and seize Ostrov and Pskov. By the 19th, German 16th Army had pulled back to a switch line called the Lithuania position, but Soviet forces kept going, and Pskov had to be given up on the 22nd.

After the breaching of the Panther Line, 3rd Baltic Front was directed northwest both to retake Estonia and cut off retreating elements of Army Group North in the Tartu Offensive, and later the Riga Offensive. Although most of the German forces were able to escape (only to be bottled up in the Courland Pocket), the former objective was won.

As these offensives drew to a close, it became apparent that 54th Army was no longer needed on a front that was contracting in length as it drew closer to Germany. Following the capture of Riga in mid-October, 3rd Baltic Front was disbanded, and 54th Army was removed to STAVKA reserves. On December 13, Lt. Gen. Roginsky was placed in reserve; he would later briefly command 67th Army. On the last day of 1944, 54th Army was officially disbanded, and its forces were distributed to other formations.

== Commanders ==
- Marshal of the Soviet Union Grigory Kulik (from 02.09.1941 to 25.09.1941);
- Lieutenant General Mikhail Khozin (from September 26, 1941, to 26.10.1941);
- Major General Ivan Fedyuninsky (from 27.10.1941 to 22 April 1942);
- Major General Aleksandr Sukhomlin (from April 22, 1942, to March 11, 1943);
- Major General, from 25.09.1943 Lieutenant General Sergey Roginsky (from March 11, 1943, to 13.12.1944);
