= 286th Rifle Division =

- Active: 1941–1945
- Country: Soviet Union
- Branch: Red Army
- Type: Rifle division
- Engagements: World War II
- Decorations: Order of the Red Banner
- Battle honours: Leningrad

The 286th Rifle Division (Russian: 286-я стрелковая дивизия) was an infantry division of the Soviet Union's Red Army during World War II. Formed in the summer of 1941, the division entered combat during the fall of that year, fighting in operations attempting to break the siege of Leningrad. The division fought in the same area until the relief of Leningrad in February 1944, when it was transferred northwards to fight in the Vyborg–Petrozavodsk Offensive, which ended the Continuation War. The division was transferred to Poland with the end of the Continuation War, and fought in the Vistula–Oder Offensive and the Prague Offensive in early 1945. The division was disbanded soon after the end of the war in the summer of 1945.

== History ==
The 286th began forming on 10 July 1941 at Cherepovets, part of the Arkhangelsk Military District. Its basic order of battle included the 994th, 996th, and 998th Rifle Regiments, as well as the 854th Artillery Regiment. In mid-August the division was transferred to the Reserve of the Supreme High Command. While still forming in early September, the 286th was assigned to the 54th Army, also forming to the east of Leningrad. When the division was sent into combat with the 54th Army in October, its strength, less than half of the authorized division strength, was 6,016 personnel, 102 machine guns, 5 82 mm or 120 mm mortars, and 27 76 mm or larger guns. The division fought as part of the 54th Army on the Leningrad Front until January 1942, when it was transferred to the Volkhov Front's 8th Army. The 286th served with the 8th Army until January 1944, fighting in operations attempting to end the siege of Leningrad.

The division transferred to the 59th Army for the Leningrad–Novgorod Offensive in January 1944, which ended the siege of Leningrad. During the offensive, the 854th Artillery Regiment's 1st and 2nd Battalions were equipped with 12 76 mm guns each, while the 3rd Battalion received eight 76 mm guns and a battery of four 122 mm howitzers. After the disbandment of the Volkhov Front, the division transferred back to the 8th Army. On 21 April, the 286th became part of the 21st Army's 109th Rifle Corps, preparing for the Vyborg–Petrozavodsk Offensive, an attack which would result in Finnish withdrawal from the war. The division fought in the offensive from June to September, when Finland signed a peace treaty with the Soviet Union.

The division was moved south to become part of the 59th Army in September. The 286th spent the rest of the war with the 59th Army. In December the 59th was moved south to join the 1st Ukrainian Front, after which the division became part of the 115th Rifle Corps. The division fought in the Vistula–Oder Offensive in January 1945, during which the division was one of the four that liberated the Auschwitz concentration camp. The division then fought in the Upper Silesian Offensive in late March, and the Prague Offensive in early May. The division was disbanded in the summer of 1945 with the Central Group of Forces.
