= 281st Rifle Division =

- Active: 1941–1945
- Country: Soviet Union
- Branch: Red Army
- Type: Rifle division
- Engagements: World War II
- Decorations: Order of Suvorov 2nd class
- Battle honours: Lyuban

Commanders
- Notable commanders: Ivan Kravtsov

The 281st Rifle Division (Russian: 281-я стрелковая дивизия) was an infantry division of the Soviet Union's Red Army during World War II. Formed in the summer of 1941, the division fought in the siege of Leningrad until the end of the siege in early 1944, when it advanced into eastern Estonia. The 281st was soon moved north to fight against Finland during the summer of that year, and after Finland's withdrawal from the war fought in battles in East Prussia and Poland during early 1945. The division was disbanded in the summer of 1945.

== History ==
The 281st Rifle Division began forming on 10 July 1941 at Leningrad from reservists. The division's basic order of battle included the 1062nd, 1064th, and the 1066th Rifle Regiments, as well as the 816th Artillery Regiment. It was brought up to strength in July by around 3,000 untrained civilians from Leningrad volunteer "fighter battalions." On 13 August, it was sent to the defensive line at Kingisepp, south of the city. For most of the rest of the year, the 281st was a "fire brigade", directly subordinated to the Leningrad Front. On 17 December, the division transferred to the 54th Army, which was fighting to the east of the Volkhov River. The 281st fought in the Volkhov area as part of the 54th Army, which became part of the Volkhov Front.

After the Leningrad–Novgorod Offensive ended the siege of Leningrad in February 1944, the Volkhov Front was disbanded, and the division became part of the 8th Army. The 282nd fought in the Narva area but was soon transferred to the 98th Rifle Corps. The 98th Rifle Corps became part of the 23rd Army, and the division fought in the Vyborg–Petrozavodsk Offensive, a Soviet attack in the Karelian Isthmus during the summer of 1944, which resulted in the withdrawal of Finland from the war in September. After spending September in the Reserve of the Supreme High Command, the 281st and the 98th Rifle Corps moved south to become part of the 2nd Shock Army. The 282nd fought in the East Prussian Offensive and the East Pomeranian Offensive in early 1945. At the end of the war the 98th Rifle Corps was directly subordinated to the 2nd Belorussian Front and placed in the reserve in Germany. Postwar, the division was disbanded in the summer of 1945 with the Northern Group of Forces.
