= 67th Army (Soviet Union) =

- 67-я армия
- Active: 1942–1945
- Country: Soviet Union
- Branch: Red Army
- Size: Field army
- Part of: 3rd Baltic Front
- Engagements: World War II: Siege of Leningrad; Operation Iskra; Leningrad-Novgorod Offensive; Tartu Offensive; Riga Offensive; Courland Pocket

Commanders
- Notable commanders: Nikolai Simoniak

The 67th Army (Russian: 67-я армия) was a field army of the Soviet Union's Red Army. The 67th Army was formed in October 1942 on the Leningrad Front from the Neva Operational Group. It defended the right bank of the Neva River, holding the Nevsky Pyatachok and covering the Road of Life. In January 1943 the army fought in Operation Iskra. In late December, the army was combined with 55th Army. The 67th Army headquarters was disbanded and 55th Army headquarters was renamed 67th Army headquarters. Between January and March 1944 67th Army fought in the Leningrad–Novgorod Offensive, in which it captured Mga and Luga. In April the army became part of the 3rd Baltic Front and fought in the Pskov-Ostrov Offensive in July and the Tartu Offensive in August and September. The army fought in the Riga Offensive in September and October. The army then fought to eliminate the Courland Pocket. After the end of the war the army was disbanded during the summer of 1945.

== History ==
=== Formation ===
The 67th Army was formed on 10 October 1942 on the basis of a Stavka directive dated on 9 October 1942. It was part of the Leningrad Front and was formed from the Neva Operational Group as a result of the failure of the Sinyavino Offensive, in which the Neva Operational Group was unable to capture significant bridgeheads across the Neva. The Operational Group was reinforced with new units and redesignated the 67th Army. The 67th Army's first commander was Major General Mikhail Dukhanov. By early November, it included the 45th Guards, 46th, and 86th Rifle Divisions, the 11th and 55th Rifle Brigades, the 16th Fortified Area, and artillery, tank, and other units. The army defended the right bank of the Neva from the rapids to Lake Ladoga. At the same time it held the Nevsky Pyatachok and covered the Road of Life across Lake Ladoga. During late December the army conducted training operations in preparation for the forthcoming Operation Iskra, an offensive aimed at defeating the 18th Army in the Shlisselburg-Sinyavino bulge and lifting the Siege of Leningrad.

=== 1943 Operations around Leningrad ===
Operation Iskra began on 12 January. On 12 January, after an artillery bombardment, the army advanced along a 12-kilometer front across the ice on the Neva with four rifle divisions between Shlisselburg and Dubrovka. The 45th Guards Rifle Division and 86th Rifle Division's attacks were repulsed by German troops. The 136th and 268th Rifle Divisions attacked around Marino, losing 3,000 casualties. The two divisions overran forward German divisions and captured Marino, capturing a bridgehead. The German 170th Infantry Division formed a defense line around the Gorodok hospital and power plant, stopping the advance.

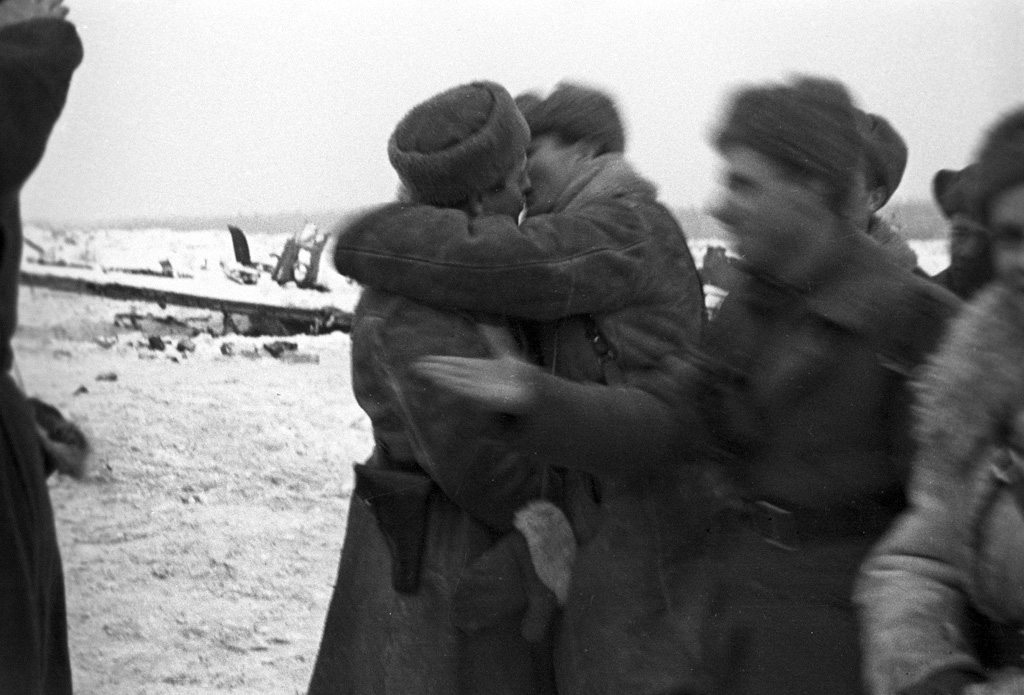
Troops of the 67th Army and 2nd Shock Army link up during Operation Iskra

On 13 January, the army's 136th Rifle Division and the 61st Tank Brigade advanced four kilometers to the east. The 170th Infantry Division counterattacked after the failure of the Soviet attack there, forcing the 268th Division back two kilometers. For the next three days the army advanced to the northeast but was stopped at Gorodok. On the morning of 18 January the army linked up with the Volkhov Front's 2nd Shock Army. The 136th Rifle Division and 61st Tank Brigade advanced into Workers Settlement No. 5 and the 86th Rifle Division captured Shlisselburg. German troops established a new defensive line and the 67th Army continued to attack Gorodok on 20 January but was unsuccessful.

The 67th Army supported the attack in the Battle of Krasny Bor, capturing Gorodok after six days on 18 February. On 22 July, the 67th Army attacked the Sinyavino Heights from the west. Its 30th Guards Rifle Corps was stopped by German resistance. The attack continued at a lower intensity until 22 August. The attack was begun again on 15 September and the 30th Guards Rifle Corps captured the Sinyavino Heights. On 25 December, the 67th Army's headquarters was disbanded and 55th Army's headquarters was renamed 67th Army headquarters. 55th Army commander Lieutenant general Vladimir Sviridov took command.

=== Leningrad-Novgorod Offensive ===
On 1 January 1944, the army included the 116th and 118th Rifle Corps, the 291st Rifle Division, 14th Fortified Area, 81st Gun Artillery Brigade, artillery, engineering, and other units. The army fought in the Leningrad-Novgorod Offensive. Operating in conjunction with the troops of the Volkhov Front it defeated the Mga and Luga groups of German troops and captured Mga on 21 January. The army attempted to surround the German XXVII Army Corps and XXVIII Army Corps from the north, but its attacks were stopped by the 12th Panzer Division. The army captured Luga on 12 February. Continuing the offensive, the army reached the Pskov-Ostrov fortified area at the end of February. In March Sviridov was replaced by Lieutenant general Vladimir Romanovsky.

=== Operations in the Baltic ===
On 24 April the 67th Army became part of the newly formed 3rd Baltic Front. By 1 June 1944, the army comprised the 110th Rifle Corps (168th, 265th, 268th Rifle Divisions), 116th Rifle Corps (85th, 86th, 291st Rifle Divisions), 119th Rifle Corps (198th, 285th, 326th Rifle Divisions) and 123rd Rifle Corps (56th, 239th, 364th Rifle Divisions).

It fought in the Pskov-Ostrov Offensive between 17 and 21 July. The army captured Ostrov on 21 July. Between 10 August and 6 September it fought in the Tartu Offensive. The army broke through the lines of German XXXVIII Army Corps on the first day of the offensive and captured Pechory on the next day. The army captured Voru on 13 August, at which point the army's advance was shifted towards Tartu. Tartu was captured on 25 August, after a day of heavy street fighting. Between 14 September and 22 October the army fought in the Riga Offensive. The army helped push back the German 16th and 18th Armies and captured Riga on 13 October, reaching the coast. On 16 October the army became part of the Leningrad Front. The army then took up defensive positions to secure the coast of the Gulf of Riga. In March 1945 Nikolai Simoniak became the army's commander. The Courland Pocket surrendered at the end of the war in early May. The army was disbanded between June and July. The army headquarters was disbanded on 2 August in the Leningrad Military District.

== Commanders ==
- Major General Mikhail Dukhanov (October 10, 1942 - December 15, 1943)
- Lieutenant general Vladimir Petrovich Sviridov (December 15, 1943 - March 23, 1944)
- Lieutenant general Vladimir Zakharovich Romanovsky (March 24, 1944 - February 28, 1945)
- Lieutenant general Sergey Roginsky (February 28 - March 31, 1945)
- Lieutenant general Nikolai Simoniak (March 31 - until the end of the war)
