= 3rd Baltic Front =

3rd Baltic Front - 3-й Прибалтийский фронт
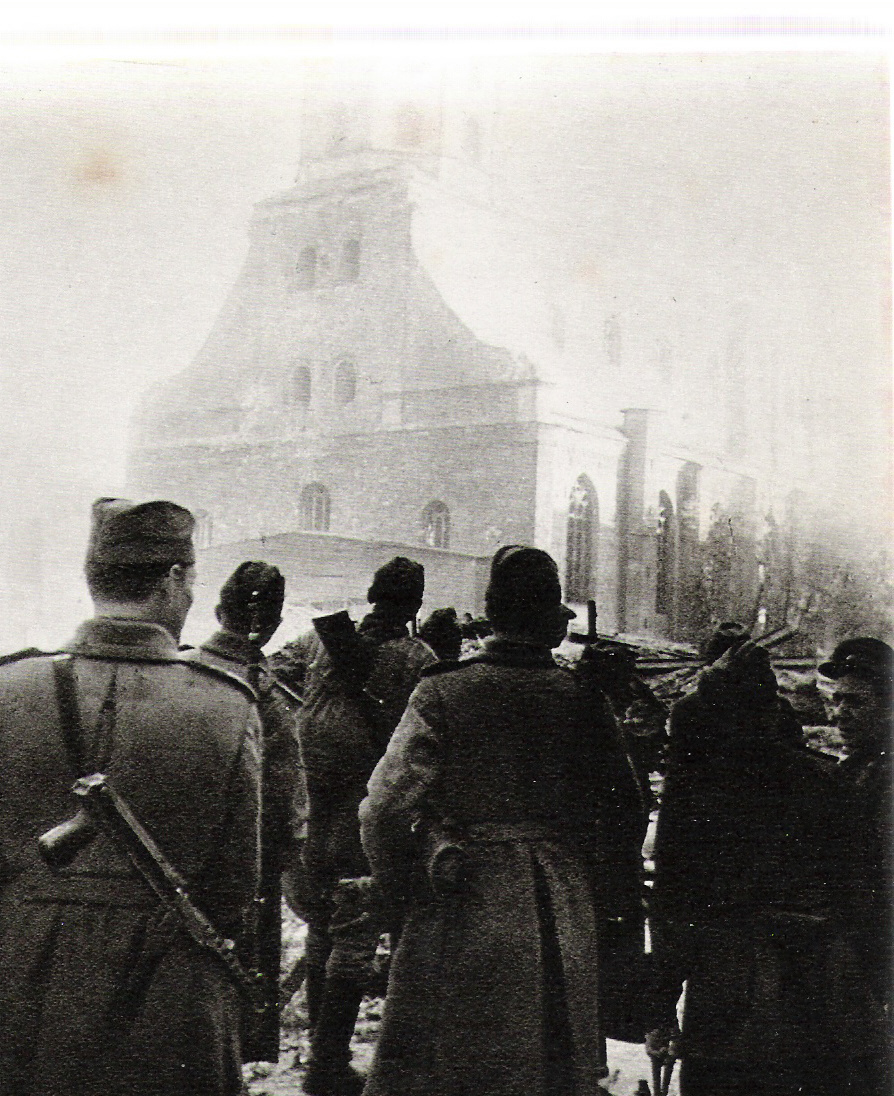
- Soviet troops in the city of Riga (october 1944)
- Active: April – October 1944
- Country: Soviet Union
- Branch: Red Army
- Type: Army group
- Size: 345,500 (September 1944)
- Engagements: Pskov-Ostrov Operation; Tartu Operation

The 3rd Baltic Front (Russian: 3-й Прибалтийский фронт) was a front of the Red Army during the Second World War. It was set up on 21 April 1944 and disbanded on 16 October that year after a series of campaigns in the Baltic states that culminated with the capture of Riga October 13–15, 1944. During 179 days of existence, the 3rd Baltic Front suffered 43,155 killed and missing in action as well as 153,876 wounded, sick, and frostbitten personnel. The sole commander of the 3rd Baltic Front was Ivan Maslennikov.

The headquarters of the 3rd Baltic Front was formed from that of the disbanded 20th Army, and the field armies subordinated to the front were taken from the left (south) wing of the Leningrad Front. Operations that the 3rd Baltic Front took part in include the Pskov-Ostrov Operation and the Tartu Operation. Upon the capture of Riga, the Soviet high command disbanded the 3rd Baltic Front as a headquarters and reassigned its component armies.

3rd Baltic Front composition, May 1944
Army	Number and type of divisions	Independent brigades
42nd	5 rifle divisions	-
54th	6 rifle divisions 1 anti-aircraft division	1 sapper brigade
67th	10 rifle divisions 1 artillery division 1 anti-aircraft division	1 gun-artillery brigade 1 tank brigade
14th Air	1 fighter division 1 close support division 1 composite air division	-
Front HQ	6 rifle divisions	2 tank brigades 1 assault sapper brigade
