= Leningrad Front =

Red Army group on the Eastern Front of World War II

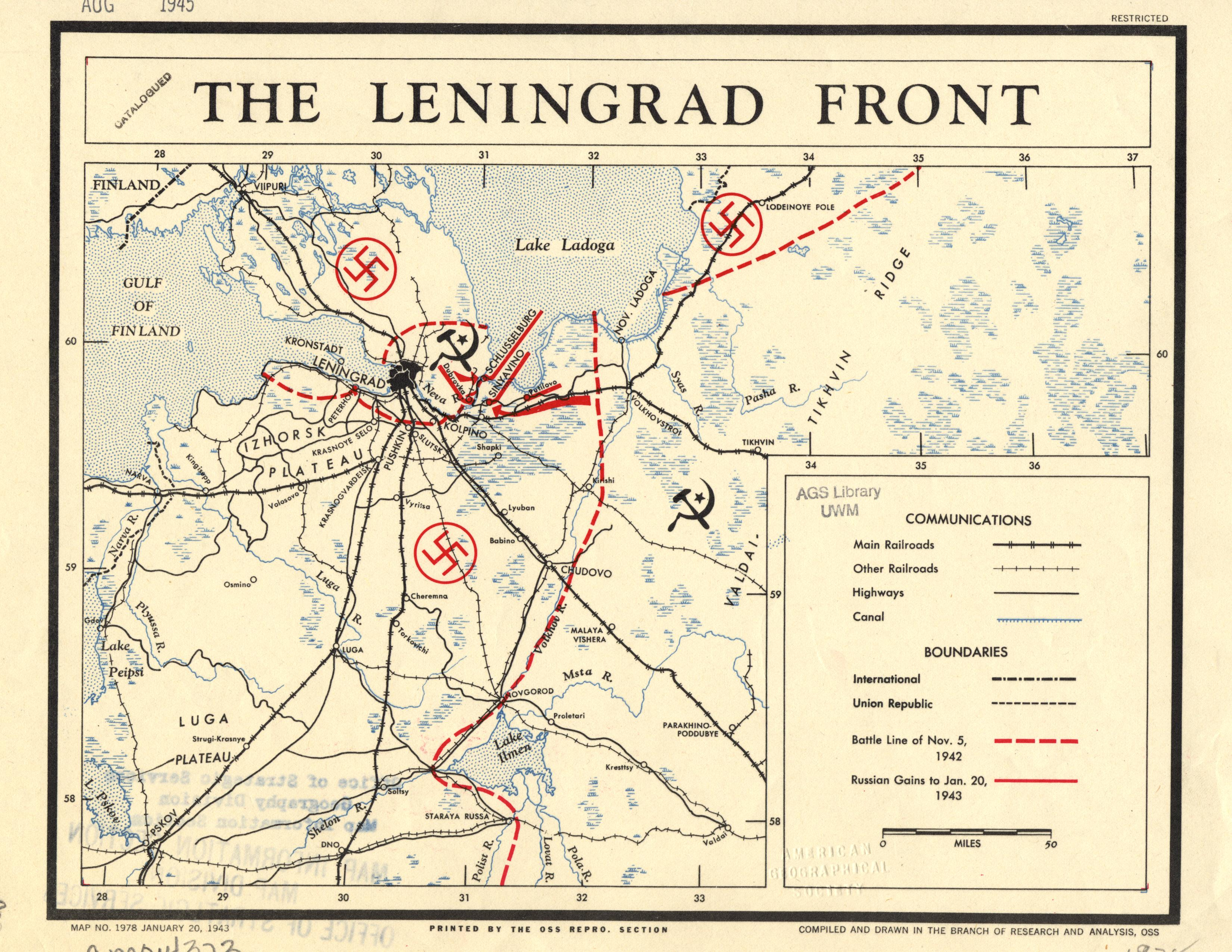
- CIA map 1943
- Active: 1941–1945
- Country: Soviet Union
- Branch: Red Army
- Type: Army Group Command
- Size: Several Armies
- Engagements: World War II; Leningrad Strategic Defensive; Siege of Leningrad; Baltic Offensive; Battle of Courland

Commanders
- Notable commanders: Georgy Zhukov; Leonid Govorov

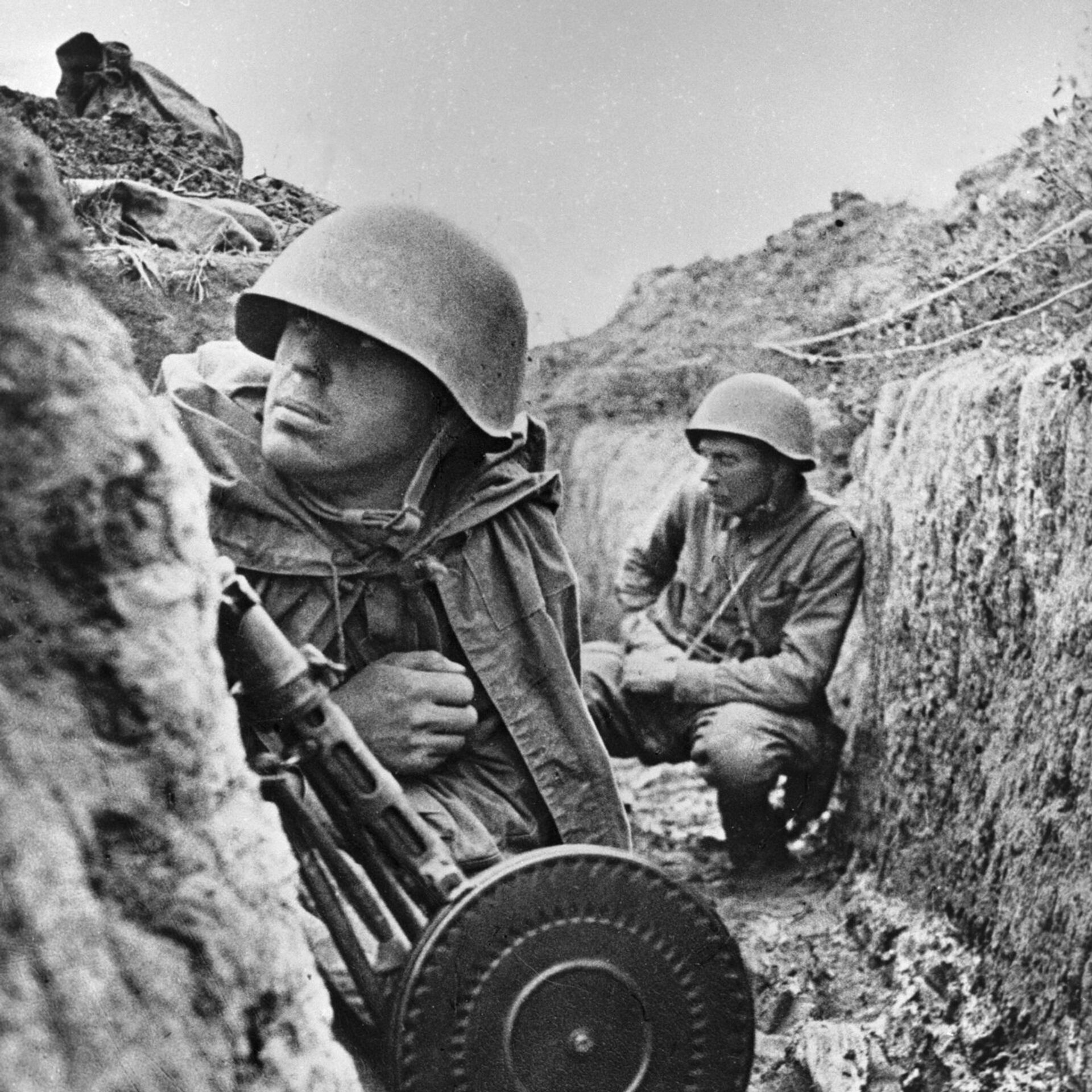
Soviet soldiers in the trenches on the Leningrad Front before an offensive. The soldier in the center possesses a DP machine gun.

The Leningrad Front (Russian: Ленинградский фронт) was a Soviet front (army group) formed during the 1941 German approach on Leningrad (now Saint Petersburg) by dividing the Northern Front into the Leningrad Front and Karelian Front on August 27, 1941.

== History ==
The Leningrad Front was immediately given the task of containing the German drive towards Leningrad and defending the city from the approaching Army Group North. By September 1941, German forces to the south were effectively stopped on the outskirts of Leningrad, initiating the two-and-a-half-year-long siege of Leningrad. Although Finnish forces to the north stopped at the old Finnish–Soviet border, the Leningrad Front suffered severe losses on the Finnish Front. From September 8, soldiers of the front were forced to conduct operations under the conditions of a blockade, with very little supply. Some supplies did reach the city however via the lake Road of Life.

During the blockade, the front executed various offensive and defensive operations, until finally with the help of the Baltic and Volkhov Front, the blockade was lifted. From June 1942, Leonid Govorov had been the commander of the front, and in June 1944, he was awarded the title Marshal of the Soviet Union. In January 1943, forces of the Leningrad Front made their first advances in years when they took the town of Shlisselburg from German forces, thus restoring communications between Leningrad and the rest of the country. In mid and late-January 1944 the Leningrad Front, along with the Volkhov Front, the 1st Baltic Front and the 2nd Baltic Front, pushed back Army Group North and broke the 28-month-long blockade. Several days later, these forces would completely liberate all of the Leningrad Oblast and Kalinin Oblast. Six months later, the Leningrad Front took over the town of Narva.

On April 21, 1944, parts of the Leningrad Front were broken off to create the 3rd Baltic Front. In June 1944, the Leningrad Front, along with the Baltic fleet had successfully carried out the Vyborg operation. As a result of which, Finland would later leave the German side of the war. From September–November 1944, the front participated in the Baltic Offensive, it advanced in the Narva-Tartu direction, and then towards Tallinn. Following the capture of continental Estonia, elements of the front, along with the Baltic fleet, took part in recapturing the Moonsund archipelago. These were the last offensive operations of the front. Forces of the Leningrad Front were then stationed on the Soviet-Finnish border, and all along the Baltic coast from Leningrad to Riga. Later, the Leningrad Front was reinforced with elements of the recently disbanded 2nd Baltic Front. These forces were primarily stationed near the Courland Pocket, with the task of containing the German Army Group Courland, which would continue to resist Soviet forces up until the end of war in Europe.

On June 24, 1945, the Leningrad Front was reorganized into the Leningrad Military District.

== Structure ==
Upon its creation in August 1941, the Leningrad Front included:

- 8th Army
- 23rd Army
- 48th Army
- Koporye operational group
- Southern operational group
- Slutsk operational group
- Baltic Fleet

Following November 25, 1942, the structure of the Leningrad Front constantly increased, it subsequently included:

- 20th Army
- 21st Army
- 22nd Army
- 42nd Army
- 51st Army
- 52nd Army
- 54th Army (until October 1944, then disbanded)
- 55th Army (August 1941 - December 1943, then disbanded)
- 59th Army
- 67th Army
- 1st Shock Army
- 2nd Shock Army
- 4th Shock Army
- 6th Guards Army
- 10th Guards Army
- 3rd Air Army
- 13th Air Army
- 15th Air Army

== Commanders ==
- Lieutenant General - Markian Popov (August–September 1941);
- Marshal of the Soviet Union - Kliment Voroshilov (September 1941);
- General of the Army - Georgy Zhukov (September–October 1941);
- Major General - Ivan Fedyuninski (October 1941);
- Lieutenant General - Mikhail Khozin (October 1941 – June 1942);
- Marshal of the Soviet Union (as of June 1944) - Leonid Govorov (June 1942 – July 1945).

== See also ==
- Continuation War#Trench warfare 1942-1943
