= 64th Guards Rifle Division =

- Active: 1943–1997
- Country: Soviet Union; Russia
- Branch: Red Army (1943-1946); Soviet Army (1946-1991); Russian Ground Forces (1991-1997)
- Type: Division
- Role: Infantry
- Engagements: Siege of Leningrad; Operation Polyarnaya Zvezda; Leningrad-Novgorod Offensive; Narva Offensive; Vyborg-Petrozavodsk Offensive; Tallinn Offensive; Courland Pocket
- Decorations: Order of the Red Banner
- Battle honours: Krasnoye Selo

Commanders
- Notable commanders: Mjr. Gen. N. A. Poliakov; Mjr. Gen. I. D. Romantsov

The 64th Guards Rifle Division was created on January 19, 1943, from the 327th Rifle Division, in recognition of that division's distinguished combat record in the Second Siniavino Offensive and Operation Iskra. It was one of a relatively small number of formations raised to Guards status in the northern sector of the Soviet-German Front. As such, it was employed as an assault division in the subsequent fighting, particularly in the final defeat of the German forces before Leningrad, and the final offensive against Finland. The division ended the war in Lithuania, helping to contain the enemy forces trapped in the Courland Pocket, and went on to serve well into the postwar era, still in the Leningrad/St. Petersburg area.

== Formation ==
When the 64th Guards was formed, its basic order of battle was as follows:

- 191st Guards Rifle Regiment from 1098th Rifle Regiment
- 194th Guards Rifle Regiment from 1100th Rifle Regiment
- 197th Guards Rifle Regiment from 1102nd Rifle Regiment
- 134th Guards Artillery Regiment from 894th Artillery Regiment

The division was considered a "sister" to the 63rd Guards Rifle Division, which was forming in the same area at the same time. The two divisions served almost the entire remainder of the war in 30th Guards Rifle Corps.

During Operation Polyarnaya Zvezda, in February and March, the 64th Guards was in 8th Army. On March 19 it was in the army's second echelon as it started its attack from south of Voronovo towards Mga. During the first three days of intense fighting the first echelon divisions penetrated 3 – 4 km along a 7 km front at the junction of the defending 1st and 223rd Infantry Divisions. The army commander, Lt. Gen. F.N. Starikov, then committed a small mobile group, the 191st Guards Rifle Regiment and a battalion of the 122nd Tank Brigade, with orders to cut the rail line between Mga and Kirishi, and then wheel northwest towards Mga Station. Despite heavy rain which prevented any air support, the group reached the rail line east of Turyshkino Station before being halted by hastily assembled German reinforcements. A further effort was made by the full division, backed by 14th Rifle Division and 1st Separate Rifle Brigade from reserve, on April 1 against the German defenses around Karbusel, just east of the Mga-Kirishi line. This attack was repelled by the 121st Infantry Division, with heavy losses to the attackers. This marked the end of Polarnaya Zvezda, and the Soviets went over to the defense the following day.

== Breaking the Siege ==
At the start of the Fifth Siniavino Offensive on July 22, 64th Guards was in the newly formed 30th Guards Rifle Corps, commanded by Lt. Gen. Nikolai Simoniak, in 67th Army. The corps' objective was to capture Arbuzovo and advance on Mga from the north, supported by the 30th Guards and 220th Tank Brigades and the 31st and 29th Guards Tank Regiments. At the start of the operation the division was in the corps' second echelon. On the second day 63rd Guards Rifles occupied the first line of enemy trenches in the Arbuzovo region, and the second line the next morning, but by August 4 the attack had bogged down in the face of German reinforcements, becoming little more than an exchange of artillery and mortar fire.

30th Guards Corps was pulled back for rest and refitting east of Leningrad later that month. On September 13 the corps headquarters got orders to prepare to take the leading role in the Sixth Siniavino Offensive. Once again, 64th Guards was to be in second echelon. On September 15, following a reorganized and improved artillery fire plan, and with significant air support, the three Guards divisions stormed the Siniavino Heights and finally seized them in only 30 minutes. This brought an end to the struggle that had been waged for this position for nearly two years at the cost of hundreds of thousands of casualties. Having achieved this objective, the offensive quickly wound down.

As of January 1, 1944, the 64th Guards was in 30th Guards Corps, now under 42nd Army in Leningrad Front. In the plan for the Leningrad–Novgorod Offensive, the three rifle corps of that army were to penetrate German defenses in the 17 km sector from Ligovo Station to Bolshoe Kuzmino southwest of Leningrad and liberate Krasnoye Selo. The assault began at 1100 hours on January 15, following an artillery preparation of 220,000 shells fired from 2,300 guns over one hour and 40 minutes. The three divisions of 30th Guards Corps attacked from Pulkovo Heights and by the end of the day had advanced 4.5 km through very dense defenses, although the corps on each flank encountered greater resistance. An advance of another 3 – 4 km was achieved the next day, but at greater cost. By the 17th the enemy forces north of Ropsha and Krasnoye Selo were under threat of encirclement, and 123rd Rifle Corps was committed on the right flank of 30th Guards Corps. On January 19 the encirclement was completed while the two rifle corps stormed Krasnoye Selo, and 64th Guards Rifle Division was granted that name as an honorific:

"KRASNOYE SELO" - 64th Guards Rifle Division (Major General Romantsov, Ivan Danilovich)... The troops who participated in the breakthrough of enemy defenses and the liberation of Krasnoye Selo and Ropsha, by the order of the Supreme High Command of January 19, 1944, and a commendation in Moscow, are given a salute of 20 artillery salvoes from 224 guns.

It shared this honour with 63rd Guards and two divisions of the 123rd Corps.

For the remainder of January, 42nd Army pursued the defeated German forces in the direction of Kingisepp, which was liberated on February 1. In the course of this fighting, 2nd Shock Army forced two crossings of the Narva River, north and south of the fortress city of Narva. As a reward for this achievement, Leningrad Front transferred 30th Guards Corps to the latter army from the former on February 3. 2nd Shock launched a new attack on February 11, in which the 30th Guards Corps scored the only real success, advancing from the south to cut the road and railroad running from Narva to Iykhvi on the 15th, and taking Auvere with 64th Guards two days later. However, this was the limit reached, as the corps was counterattacked by Feldherrnhalle Panzergrenadier Division. The 64th, along with its corps, took significant casualties in this operation and soon were withdrawn for rebuilding.

== Karelian Offensive ==
In April, STAVKA's attention turned to completing the war with Finland. For this purpose Leningrad Front was reinforced with the headquarters of 21st Army on April 28. 30th Guards Corps was in Front reserves southwest of Leningrad at this time. In early May it was assigned to 21st Army. When the offensive began on June 9–10, the 64th Guards was once again in second echelon of its corps. Following initial penetrations of the line held by the Finnish IV Army Corps, 21st Army surged forward, and on the 11th the division was ordered to deploy forward, attack the flank and rear of the forces defending Khirelia, which were blocking the advance of 97th Corps, and capture the Khirelia-Perola line by the end of the day. 30th Guards Corps as a whole was to capture Kivennapa, one of the most important strongpoints in the Finns' second defensive belt, by the end of July 12. These initial operations were successful, and the Front commander, Army General Leonid Govorov, confidently expected to capture Vyborg by June 18–20. In the event, the city did fall on that latter date. Days later, at the start of the Battle of Tali-Ihantala, 64th Guards was about 15 km east of Vyborg, astride the rail line from there to Vuosalmi.

== Baltic Offensive ==
In August, 30th Guards Corps was once again assigned to 2nd Shock Army. With the fighting around Narva finally ending that month, 2nd Shock was able to move past that choke-point towards Estonia, crossing the narrows between Lake Pskov and Lake Chud. By mid-September, 64th Guards was on the outskirts of Tartu, advancing northwards. In October, the division and its corps was reassigned to 8th Army, clearing the Baltic islands and coasts, where they would remain for the duration, helping to contain the former Army Group North in the Courland Pocket.

When the shooting stopped the division was officially designated as the 64th Guards Rifle, Krasnoye Selo, Order of the Red Banner Division. (Russian: 64-я гвардейская стрелковая Красносельская Краснознамённая дивизия).

== Postwar ==
The 64th Guards continued to serve well into the postwar era, still in 30th Guards Rifle Corps, which in 1957 was redesignated as 30th Guards Army Corps. In 1957, the division was converted into a motor rifle division at Sapyornoye. During Operation Anadyr, the four motor rifle regiments sent to Cuba in the Cuban Missile Crisis were drawn from the 30th Guards Army Corps. The 302nd, 314th, and 400th Regiments were formed from units of the 269th, 194th, and 197th Guards Regiments respectively. In Cuba, they became the 43rd, 74th, and 108th Regiments. In the late 1980s, the division included the 197th Guards and 269th Guards Motor Rifle Regiments, the 10th Artillery Regiment, the 1001st Anti-Aircraft Rocket Regiment, and other smaller units at Sapyornoye. The 194th Guards Motor Rifle Regiment was at Svobodnoye, and the 83rd Separate Tank Battalion and 75th Guards Separate Engineer-Sapper Battalion were at Pontonnoye.

On June 1, 1997, the division was disbanded by being renamed the 36th Guards Weapons and Equipment Storage Base. The storage base was disbanded in 2007.
