= 372nd Rifle Division =

372nd Rifle Division (1941–1946) 46th Rifle Brigade (1946–1953) 372nd Rifle Division (1953–1955) 68th Rifle Division (1955–1957) 68th Motor Rifle Division (1957–2003)
- Active: 1941–2003
- Country: Soviet Union (1941–1991); Kazakhstan (1992–2003)
- Branch: Red Army (1941-1946); Soviet Army (1946-1991); Kazakh Ground Forces (1991–2003)
- Type: Motorized infantry
- Garrison/HQ: Sary-Ozek (1966–2003)
- Engagements: World War II: Siege of Leningrad; Lyuban Offensive Operation; Sinyavino Offensive (1942); Operation Iskra; Leningrad-Novgorod Offensive; Vyborg-Petrozavodsk Offensive; Baltic Offensive; East Prussian Offensive; East Pomeranian Offensive; Berlin Offensive; Tajik Civil War
- Decorations: Order of the Red Banner
- Battle honours: Novgorod

Commanders
- Notable commanders: Pavel Melnikov

The 372nd Rifle Red Banner Novgorod Division was a division of the Red Army during the Second World War.

== History ==
=== World War II ===
It was established at Barnaul, Altai Krai, Siberian Military District, in September 1941. Formed in accordance with NKO Order No. 459сс of 11.08.1941. Its basic order of battle was as follows:

- 1236th Rifle Regiment
- 1238th Rifle Regiment
- 1240th Rifle Regiment
- 941st Artillery Regiment

It was known informally as the "Altaisk Division". It was part of the 'operational army' from 18.12.1941 to 30.09.1944 and from 16.10.1944 to 09.05.1945.

From 11 December 1941 it joined the 59th Army, part of the Volkhov Front.

As part of the 2nd Shock Army of the Volkhov Front the division participated in Operation Spark (14–30.01.1943). At the tip of the advancing group of the Volkhov Front, soldiers of the Division (1st Battalion, 1240th Rifle Regiment) met on 18/01/1943 at 9:30 am with soldiers coming from the West (1st Battalion, 123rd Rifle Brigade), thus completing the break of the Siege of Leningrad.

During the war it fought with the 6th, 7th, 98th, 108th, and 112th Rifle Corps.

It fought at Leningrad, Vyborg, and Danzig. With 2nd Shock Army of the 2nd Belorussian Front May 1945. In accordance with Stavka VGK Order No. 11095 of 29.05.1945 it became part of the Group of Soviet Occupation Forces in Germany.

=== Cold War ===
In January 1946, the 372nd was relocated to Uryupinsk in the Don Military District. At Uryupinsk, the division was reorganized as the 46th Separate Rifle Brigade. It became part of the North Caucasus Military District when the district was reformed in summer 1946. The brigade became part of the 6th Rifle Corps. In October 1953, the brigade became the 372nd Rifle Division again. In June 1955 it was renumbered as the 68th Rifle Division. On 25 June 1957, it became the 68th Motor Rifle Division with the 6th Army Corps. It was subordinated to the North Caucasus Military District in June 1960. On 19 February 1962, the 4th Separate Equipment Maintenance and Recovery and the 28th Separate Missile Battalions were activated. The 187th Motor Rifle Regiment was used to form the 197th Motor Rifle Division at Uryupinsk and was replaced by the new 517th Motor Rifle Regiment in June 1966. Soon after, the division moved to Sary-Ozek, Alma-Ata Oblast and joined the 17th Army Corps.

In 1968, the 227th Separate Sapper Battalion became an engineer-sapper battalion. In 1972, the Separate Chemical Defence Company was upgraded to the 81st Separate Chemical Defence Battalion. In December 1979, the division was to have moved to Afghanistan, but instead only its 186th Motor Rifle Regiment crossed the border. The 186th became the 66th Separate Motor Rifle Brigade on 1 March 1980. The 186th was replaced by the new 385th Motor Rifle Regiment. In 1980, the 52nd Separate Motor Transport Battalion was renamed the 395th Separate Material Supply Battalion.

=== With the Kazakh Ground Forces ===
Taken over by the Kazakh Army in January 1992. The division sent some of its units to fight in the Tajik Civil War. The division was disbanded in 2003 and reorganized into a number of brigades and smaller units. The 517th Motor Rifle Regiment became the 37th Air Assault Brigade at Taldykurgan. The 385th Motor Rifle Regiment became the 38th Air Assault Brigade at Almaty. The 106th Separate Reconnaissance Battalion became the 4th Separate Reconnaissance Battalion at Taldykurgan. The 227th Separate Engineer-Sapper Battalion became the 4th Separate Engineer Battalion at Saryozek. The 549th Separate Communications Battalion became the 4th Separate Communications Battalion. The 188th Motor Rifle Regiment became the 9th Mechanized Brigade. The 301st Tank Regiment became the 43rd Tank Brigade. The 343rd Artillery Regiment became the 44th Artillery Brigade .
