= Leonid Govorov =

Soviet military commander (1897–1955)

Leonid Aleksandrovich Govorov
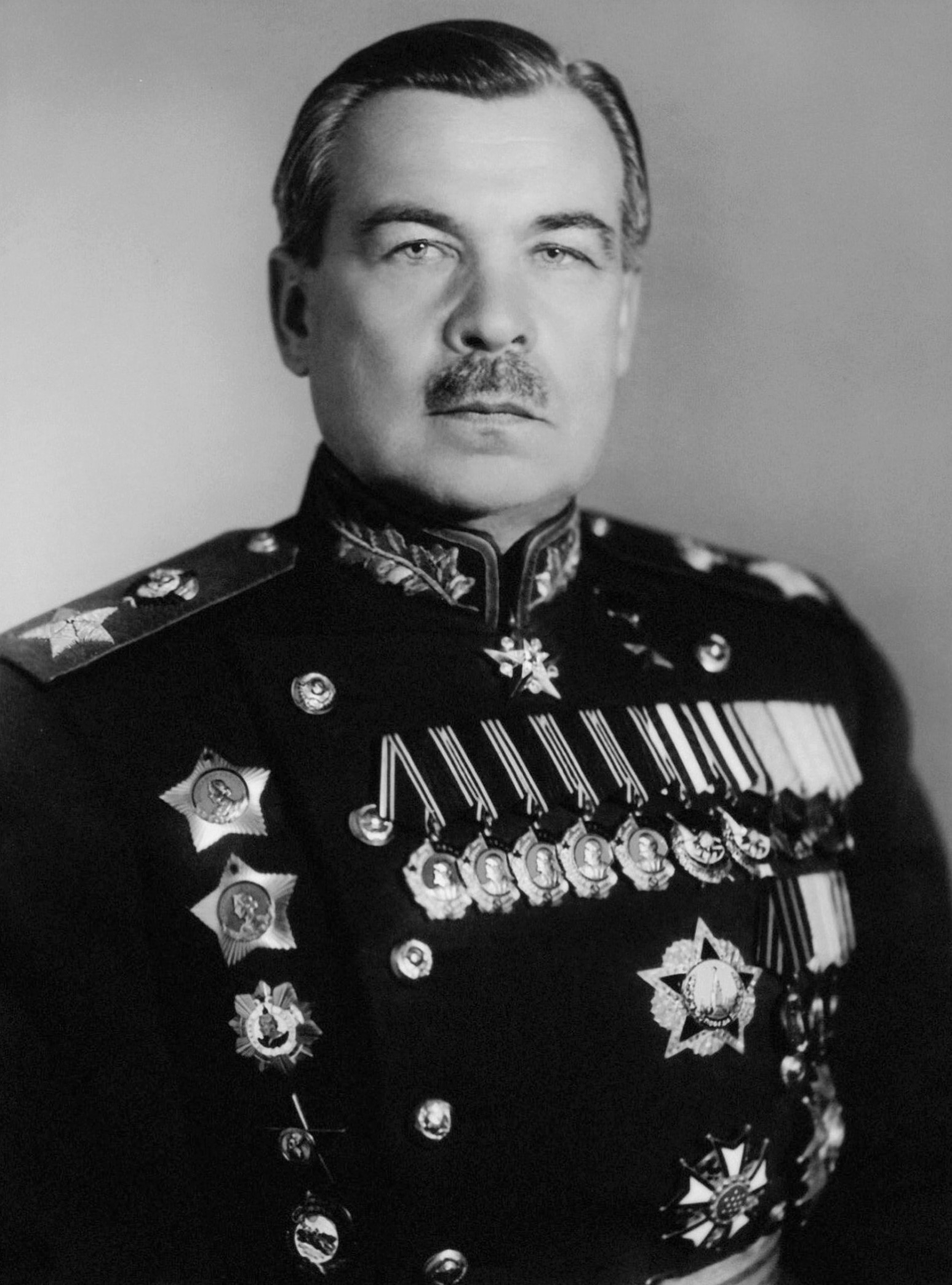
- Govorov in 1950
- Born: 22 February 1897; Butyrki, Vyatka Governorate, Russian Empire
- Died: 19 March 1955 (aged 58); Moscow, Soviet Union
- Burial place: Kremlin Wall Necropolis
- Military career
- Allegiance: Russian Empire (1916–1917); Soviet Russia (1920–1922); Soviet Union (1922–1955)
- Service years: 1916–1955
- Rank: Marshal of the Soviet Union (1944-1955)
- Units: Artillery
- Commands: 5th Army; Leningrad Front; Leningrad Military District
- Conflicts: World War I; Russian Civil War; Spring offensive; Siege of Perekop; World War II; Winter War; Great Patriotic War; Battle of Bialystok-Minsk; Battle of Moscow; Siege of Leningrad; Sinyavino Offensive; Operation Iskra; Leningrad–Novgorod strategic offensive; Battle of Narva; Vyborg–Petrozavodsk Offensive; Baltic Offensive
- Awards: Hero of the Soviet Union; Order of Lenin (5); Order of Victory; Order of the Red Banner (3); Order of Suvorov, 1st Class (2); Order of Kutuzov, 1st Class; Order of the Red Star; Légion d'honneur Croix de guerre 1939-1945
- Other work: Chief Inspector of Ground Forces; Commander of National Air Defense Forces; Deputy Minister of Defense

Leonid Aleksandrovich Govorov (Russian: Леони́д Алекса́ндрович Го́воров; 22 February [O.S. 10 February] 1897 – 19 March 1955) was a Soviet military commander. Trained as an artillery officer, he joined the Red Army in 1920. He graduated from several Soviet military academies, including the Military Academy of Red Army General Staff. He participated in the Winter War of 1939–1940 against Finland as a senior artillery officer.

In World War II, Govorov rose to command an army in November 1941 during the Battle of Moscow. He commanded the Leningrad Front from April 1942 to the end of the war. He reached the rank of Marshal of the Soviet Union in 1944, and was awarded the title of Hero of the Soviet Union and many other awards. He was the father of Soviet General Vladimir Govorov.

== Early years and Russian Revolution ==
Leonid Aleksandrovich Govorov was born into a peasant family of Russian ethnicity in the village of Butyrki in Vyatka Governorate (now in Kirov Oblast). He attended a technical high school in Yelabuga and enrolled in the shipbuilding department of Petrograd Polytechnical Institute. In December 1916, however, he was mobilized and was sent to the Konstantinovskye Artillery School, from which he graduated in 1917. He became an artillery officer with the rank of podporuchik.

When the Russian Revolution broke out and the Russian Army disintegrated, Govorov returned home, but was conscripted into the White Guard army of Aleksandr Kolchak in October 1918, serving in an artillery battery with the 8th Kama Rifle Division of the 2nd Ufa Army Corps in the Western Army, fighting in the Russian Civil War. Govorov fought in the Spring Offensive of the Russian Army, a general drive westwards by White forces in the east. He deserted in November 1919, fleeing to Tomsk, where he took part in an uprising against White authorities as part of a fighting squad. Govorov joined the Red Army in January 1920, serving in the 51st Rifle Division as an artillery battalion commander. With the division, he fought in the Siege of Perekop in November, during which Soviet forces drove Pyotr Wrangel's White Army out of Crimea. Govorov was wounded twice during the year and was awarded the Order of the Red Banner in 1921 for his actions in Crimea.

== Interwar years ==
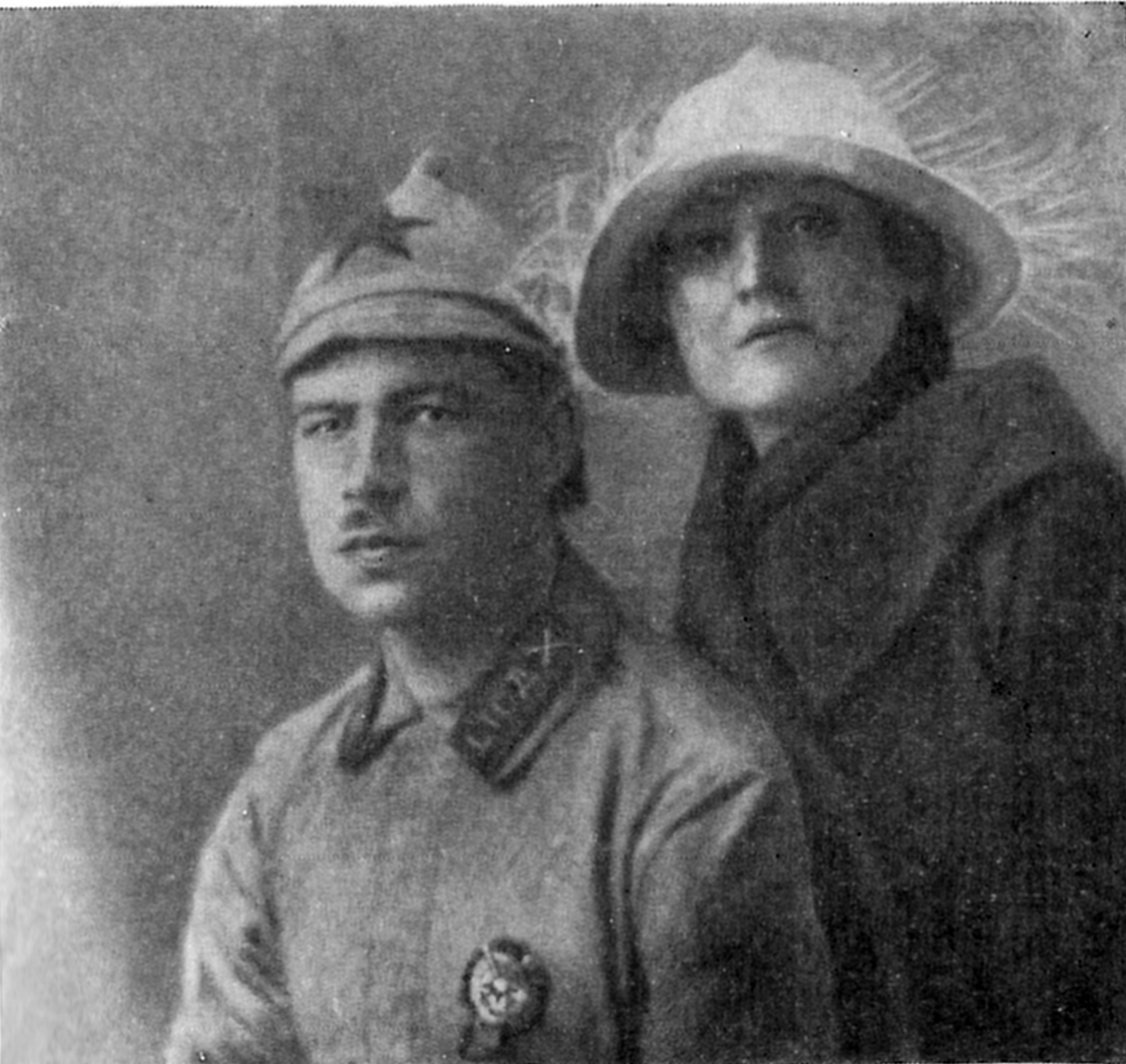
Govorov with his wife, 1923

In 1923 he met in Odessa, and later married Lydia Izdebska, the daughter of a former manager of a Polish estate. In 1924 their son Vladimir was born.

Govorov obtained further military education, graduating from the Artillery course in 1926, the Higher Academy course in 1930, and the Frunze Military Academy in 1933. In 1936, Govorov was among the first officers who attended the newly founded Military Academy of Red Army General Staff, from which he graduated in 1938.

From 1936, he was head of artillery in the Kiev Military District. In 1938 he was appointed as lecturer in tactics at the Dzerzhinsky Artillery Academy. In 1939, he finished his first research publication. This was the period of Joseph Stalin's Great Purge. Govorov was close to being arrested, but in the end survived thanks to the intervention of Mikhail Kalinin and continued to rise in rank.

== World War II ==
In 1939 the Soviet Union invaded Finland, and Govorov was appointed chief of artillery of the 7th Army, as his research while at Dzerzhinsky Artillery Academy was about assaulting and penetrating fortified enemy positions. He commanded the massive artillery assault that allowed the Soviet breakthrough along the Mannerheim Line in 1940. For this he was awarded the Order of the Red Star and promoted to the rank of division commander. He was then appointed Deputy Inspector-General of Artillery of the Red Army.

After Nazi Germany invaded the Soviet Union in June 1941, Govorov commanded the Artillery on the Western Front in Belarus from August to October 1941. During the Battle of Moscow, he was appointed Chief of Artillery of the 5th Army, under the command of Major General Dmitri Danilovich Lelyushenko. After Lelyushenko was wounded on 18 October Govorov assumed command of the army. During the Soviet counter-offensives in the winter of 1941–42, his army liberated Mozhaisk. As a result, he was promoted to the rank of lieutenant-general of artillery.

=== Defense of Leningrad ===
In April 1942 Govorov was appointed commander of the Leningrad Group of Forces of the Leningrad Front, which combined the former Leningrad and Volkhov Fronts. In July, the Volkhov Front was re-established, and Govorov became the head of the entire Leningrad Front, replacing Lieutenant General M.S. Khosin. Leningrad had been cut off from the rest of the country since September 1941, and the Soviet forces were trying to lift the siege of Leningrad, which was causing colossal damage to the city and suffering to the civilian population. The Road of Life, which was the only means of supply to the city, was frequently cut by regular German and Finnish air strikes. Despite several German requests Mannerheim decided that Finnish forces would not attack Leningrad. Soviet forces launched several offensives in the region in 1942, but these failed to lift the siege. The Lyuban Offensive Operation resulted in the encirclement and destruction of most of the Soviet 2nd Shock Army. In this situation, Govorov's background as an artilleryman was considered most valuable, since the city was under constant shelling, and one of Govorov's tasks was to launch an artillery counter-offensive against the German guns.

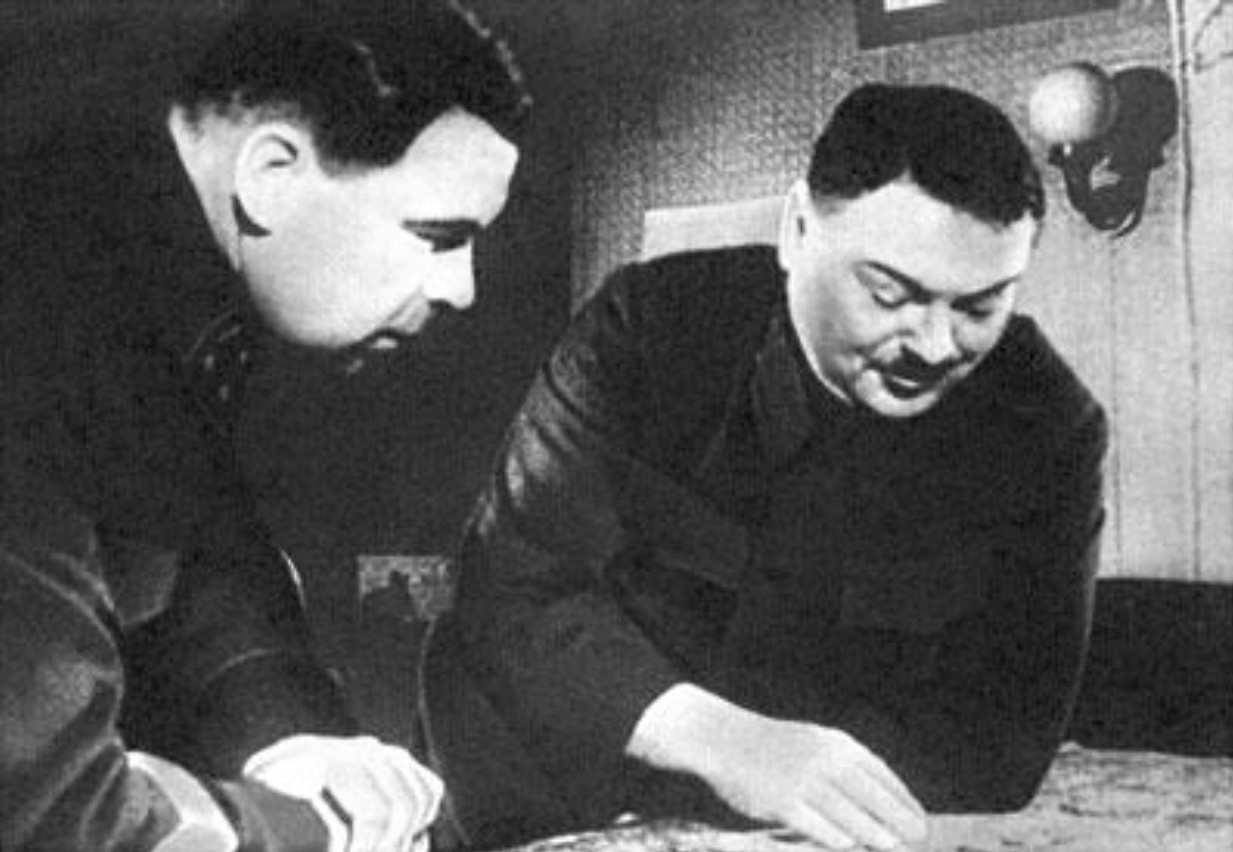
Govorov with Andrei Zhdanov during the defense of Leningrad

As soon as he became the commander of the Leningrad Front in July 1942, Govorov mounted local attacks in several sectors of the front, while preparing a much larger offensive. Together with the Volkhov Front, the Leningrad Front would break the blockade of the city by eliminating the German positions south of Ladoga Lake, where only 16 kilometres (9.9 mi) separated the Leningrad and Volkhov Fronts. This position was called "the bottleneck". At the same time, German forces were planning Operation Northern Light (German: Nordlicht) to capture the city and link up with Finnish forces. To achieve that, heavy reinforcements arrived from Sevastopol, which the German forces had captured in July 1942. Both sides were unaware of the other's preparations. As a result, the Soviet Sinyavino Offensive failed and the 2nd Shock army was decimated for the second time in a year, but the German forces suffered heavy casualties and canceled Operation Northern Light.

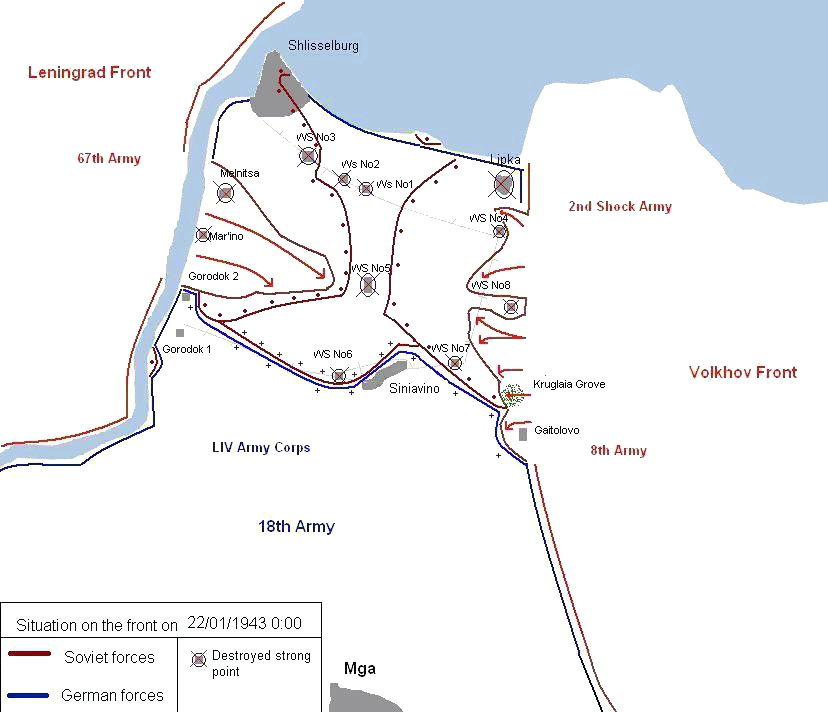
Operation Iskra, January 1943

In late November 1942, Govorov began planning the next operation to break the blockade of Leningrad. In December, the plan was approved by the Stavka and received the codename Operation Iskra (Spark). Operation Iskra began on 13 January 1943, and on 18 January Soviet forces linked up, breaking the blockade. By 22 January the front line stabilized. The operation successfully opened a land corridor 8–10 km wide to the city. A railroad was swiftly built through the corridor that allowed far more supplies to reach the city than the "Road of Life", eliminating the possibility of the capture of the city and a German-Finnish link up. Govorov was promoted to Colonel General on 15 January and was awarded the Order of Suvorov 1st Class on 28 January.

The Leningrad and Volkhov Fronts tried to follow up their success with a much more ambitious offensive operation named Operation Polyarnaya Zvezda (Polar Star). This operation had the aim of decisively defeating the German Army Group North, but achieved very modest gains. Several other offensives were conducted by Govorov in the area in 1943, slowly expanding the corridor into Leningrad, and making other small gains. In November 1943, Govorov began planning the Leningrad-Novgorod Offensive which would drive Army Group North out of the Leningrad region. On 17 November he was promoted to army general.

=== Soviet Counter Offensive ===
The Soviet offensive started on 14 January 1944. By 1 March the Leningrad, Volkhov and 2nd Baltic Fronts had driven Army Group North back up to 300 kilometres (190 mi) on a 400 kilometres (250 mi) front, liberating the southern Leningrad region and part of the Kalinin region. By that time, the reinforced German forces were at the "Panther Line", stretching from Narva to Pskov using Lake Pskov as a barrier, where the offensive was stopped in several heavy battles around Narva. On 18 April the Soviet forces were ordered to the defense, a new 3rd Baltic Front was created to coordinate operations near Narva and Govorov's Leningrad Front turned attention to the north. In June 1944, during the Vyborg–Petrozavodsk Offensive, which led to Soviet recapture of Vyborg, Govorov was promoted to the rank of marshal of the Soviet Union. Later his forces recaptured the Baltic states, and in autumn 1944 his forces blocked Army Group North in what became known as Courland Pocket. On 27 January 1945, Govorov was awarded the title of Hero of the Soviet Union.

== Post-war career ==
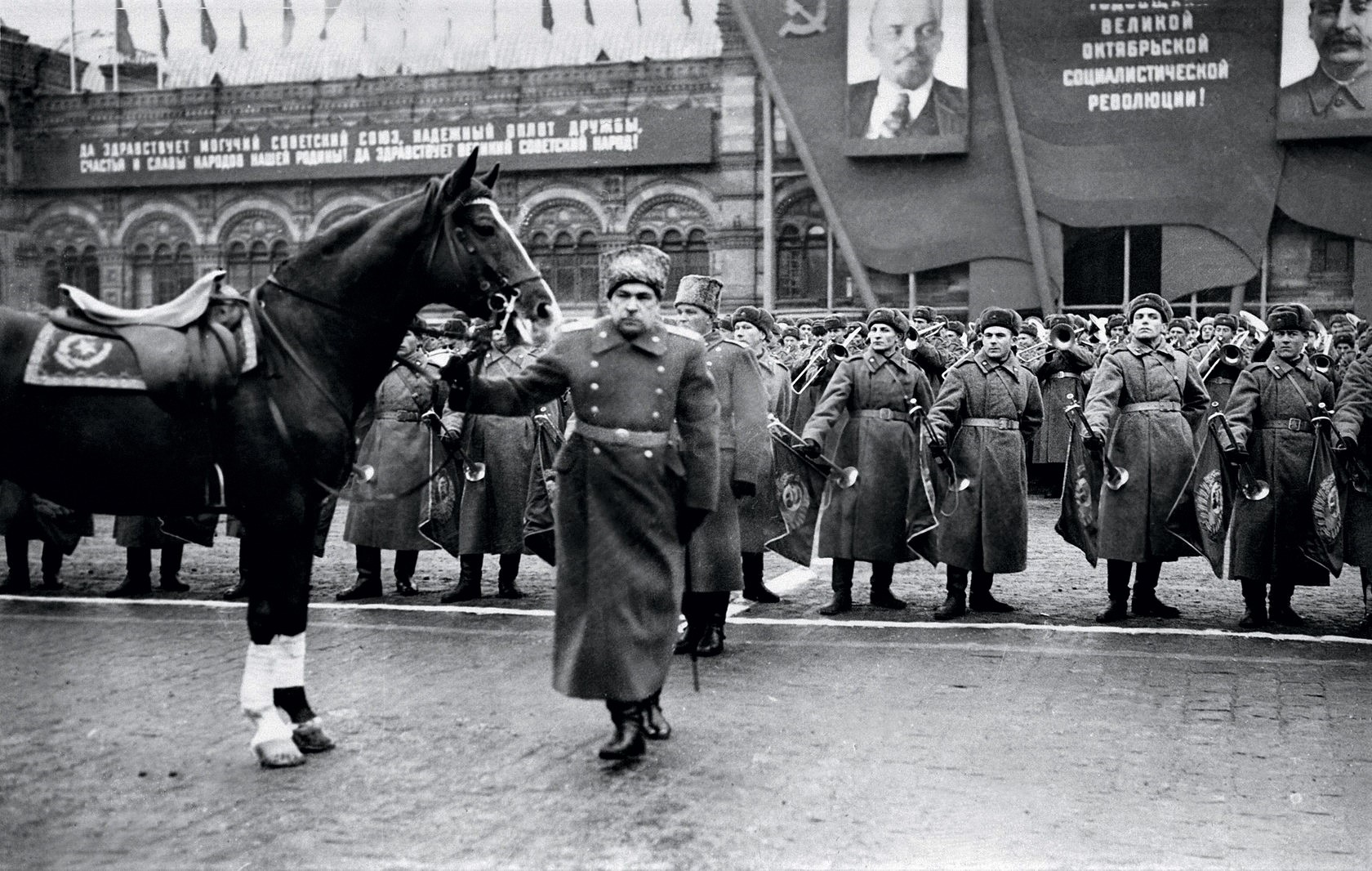
Marshal Leonid Govorov at the 30th October Revolution anniversary parade in 1947.

In the postwar years Govorov was commander of the Leningrad Military District, and then Chief Inspector of Ground Forces. In 1948 he was appointed Commander of National Air Defence Forces, and in 1952 he also became Deputy Minister of Defence. In these posts he oversaw the modernization of the Soviet air defence system for the age of the jet aircraft and the atomic bomb. But Govorov was by this time suffering from chronic heart disease, and died in March 1955. He was cremated and his ashes in the Kremlin Wall Necropolis. A street in St Petersburg is named after him.

== Honours and awards ==
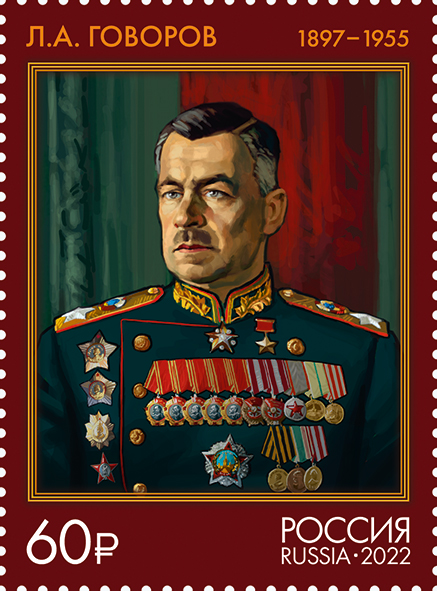
Govorov on a 2022 stamp of Russia

Soviet Awards

Hero of the Soviet Union (No. 5370–27 January 1945)
Order of Victory (No. 10–31 May 1945)
Five Orders of Lenin (10 November 1941, 2 January 1942, 27 January 1945, 21 February 1945, 21 February 1947)
Order of the Red Banner, three times (1921, 3 November 1944, 15 November 1950)
Order of Suvorov, 1st class, twice (28 January 1943, 21 February 1944)
Order of Kutuzov, 1st class (29 July 1944)
Order of the Red Star (15 January 1940)
Medal "For the Defence of Leningrad"
Medal "For the Defence of Moscow"
Medal "For the Victory over Germany in the Great Patriotic War 1941–1945"
Jubilee Medal "XX Years of the Workers' and Peasants' Red Army"
Jubilee Medal "30 Years of the Soviet Army and Navy"
Medal "In Commemoration of the 800th Anniversary of Moscow"

Foreign Awards

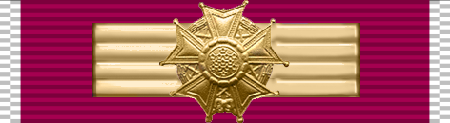
Order of the Republic (Tuvan People's Republic, 3 March 1942)
Chief Commander of the Legion of Merit (USA)
Grand Officer of the Legion of Honour (France)
Croix de Guerre 1939-45 (France)
