= 327th Rifle Division =

- Active: 1941–1946
- Country: Soviet Union
- Branch: Red Army
- Type: Infantry
- Size: Division
- Engagements: Siege of Leningrad; Lyuban Offensive Operation; Sinyavino Offensive (1942); Operation Iskra; Vyborg–Petrozavodsk Offensive; Baltic Offensive; Courland Pocket

Commanders
- Notable commanders: Maj. Gen. Ivan Mikhailovich Antiufeev; Col. Nikolai Antonovich Poliakov; Maj. Gen. Emilyan Vasilevich Kozik

The 327th Rifle Division was first formed in September 1941, as a standard Red Army rifle division, based on a cadre of workers from Voronezh. This formation was assigned to the Volkhov Front near Leningrad, toiling through the so-called "Rat's War" in the wooded swamps of that region and taking significant casualties in the encirclement of its 2nd Shock Army near Lyuban in early 1942. In January 1943, it helped to lead the partial raising of the German siege of Leningrad in Operation Iskra, distinguishing itself sufficiently to be redesignated as the 64th Guards Rifle Division. Well over a year later a second 327th Rifle Division was formed and was also moved to the Leningrad region where it took part in the offensive that drove Finland from the war, then spent the first months of 1945 clearing German forces from the coasts of the Baltic States and containing the German forces trapped in Courland.

== 1st Formation ==
The division first formed on September 1, 1941 in the Oryol Military District at Voronezh, right alongside the 329th Rifle Division. It was manned primarily by workers from that city, and when it reached the front it was considered well-trained by the standards of the time. Col. Ivan Mikhailovich Antiufeev was appointed to command the division on the day it began forming. Its basic order of battle was as follows:

- 1098th Rifle Regiment
- 1100th Rifle Regiment
- 1102nd Rifle Regiment
- 894th Artillery Regiment

In late October the division was assigned to 26th Army, which was forming up in the Reserve of the Supreme High Command. This army was assigned to the new Volkhov Front in early December, and redesignated as the 2nd Shock Army on the 17th.

=== Battles for Leningrad ===
On January 7, 1942, 2nd Shock Army entered the Lyuban Offensive Operation. The initial attacks collapsed in exhaustion and confusion, and the army commander was replaced. After regrouping, the attack was resumed on the 13th, this time with more effective artillery preparation, which shattered the defenses between two German infantry divisions and caused one of them to panic. Over the following days the army's forces managed to carve small wedges into the enemy positions, but did not penetrate them until the 17th, with the help of more than 1,500 aircraft sorties, and advanced 5 – 10 km. In order to widen the penetration, the 327th was regrouped into Operational Group Korovnikov in 59th Army for a new attack to begin on January 27. The mission was to eliminate German strongpoints at Spasskaya Polist and Lubino Pole along the Leningrad road. While the attack on the former failed, the bulk of the army, over 100,000 men, was able get past and advance as far as 75 km into the German rear, posing a grave threat to their forces in the Lyuban, Chudovo and Kirishi regions. After the mouth of the penetration was widened on February 12, the 327th, as part of a shock group with 46th Rifle Division, 80th Cavalry Division, and two ski battalions, attacked northward towards Lyuban on the 19th, enveloping and capturing Krasnaya Gorka in the process. Lyuban was only 10 km distant. However, on February 27, elements of German I Corps attacked the flanks of the penetration, recaptured Krasnaya Gorka, and encircled the 327th and 80th Cavalry in Ryabovo. Although most of the encircled forces escaped, the Germans claimed 6,000 prisoners by March 15. On May 21, Colonel Antiufeev was promoted to Major General, but a few days later he left the division; his position was taken by Col. F. M. Zhiltzov.

As the ordeal of 2nd Shock Army continued, the remnants of the division, along with 92nd Rifle Division and two rifle brigades, reached and occupied the main defensive line from Ruchi along the Ravan River to Vditsko, Rogavka Station, to Lake Tigoda on May 28, while the army's remaining forces prepared to launch an attack to link up with 59th Army; this attack was set to begin on June 5. This movement was detected by the German forces. On May 30, I Corps and XXXVIII Corps began a joint attack which severed the final link to 2nd Shock late that day, although at considerable cost. A desperate final lunge eastwards by 2nd Shock on June 5 gained little ground. During the following weeks, individual men and small groups of the 327th filtered through the porous German lines, enough that the division could be rebuilt. On July 15 the 87th Cavalry Division, which had also been trapped in the pocket, was officially disbanded, and its remnants were incorporated into the rebuilding 327th. On the same date, Colonel Zhiltzov handed his command over to Lt. Col. Nikolai Antonovich Poliakov, former commander of the 87th Cavalry. This officer was promoted to full colonel on July 25 and would lead the division for the rest of its 1st formation.

During the Third Siniavino Offensive, which began on August 19, the division was employed on a secondary sector, south of the main assault front of 2nd Shock Army. It nevertheless distinguished itself in the first week of September by enveloping and capturing the German strongpoint at Voronovo, on the Naziia River, with the help of 286th Rifle Division; both units dug in late on September 7. On January 12, 1943, Volkhov and Leningrad Fronts launched Operation Iskra, which finally opened a land corridor to the besieged city. The 327th distinguished itself again in this fighting, to the east of Siniavino, and on January 19 was redesignated as the 64th Guards Rifle Division, one of a relative handful of formations to win Guards status in the fighting on the northern sector of the Soviet-German Front.

== 2nd Formation ==
After an absence of over a year from the Red Army order of battle, a new 327th Rifle Division was formed on May 1, 1944, in the 60th Army of 1st Ukrainian Front, based on the soldiers and equipment of the 156th Fortified Region. Maj. Gen. Emilyan Vasilevich Kozik was given command, which he would hold until the last weeks of the war. The division included the 154th, 159th, and 162nd Rifle Regiments, and the 355th Artillery Regiment, along with other smaller units. It was initially in 28th Rifle Corps, but later that month was transferred to 94th Rifle Corps. With this corps the division was railed far to the north, where it became part of 7th Army in the Karelian Front in June. When the Svir–Petrozavodsk Offensive began on June 20, the 327th was transferred again, this time to 23rd Army in Leningrad Front; it would remain in this Front for the duration. At the same time it was assigned to 6th Rifle Corps, where it would remain, apart from a brief period at the end of the year, into the postwar. In January 1945, 6th Corps was shifted to 8th Army, clearing the Baltic coast and islands of remaining German troops, and from March to the war's end the division served as part of the Courland Army Group, containing the isolated forces of the former Army Group North. General Kozik left his command to Col. M. A. Rogozin on April 25.

== Postwar ==
Following the German surrender, 6th Rifle Corps was moved to the North Caucasus, with the headquarters established at Stalingrad in August. In October the 327th appears to have been stationed at Kamyshin. In the spring of 1946 the division was disbanded.
