= Operation Polar Star =

1943 Soviet military operation

- Part of the Eastern Front of World War II
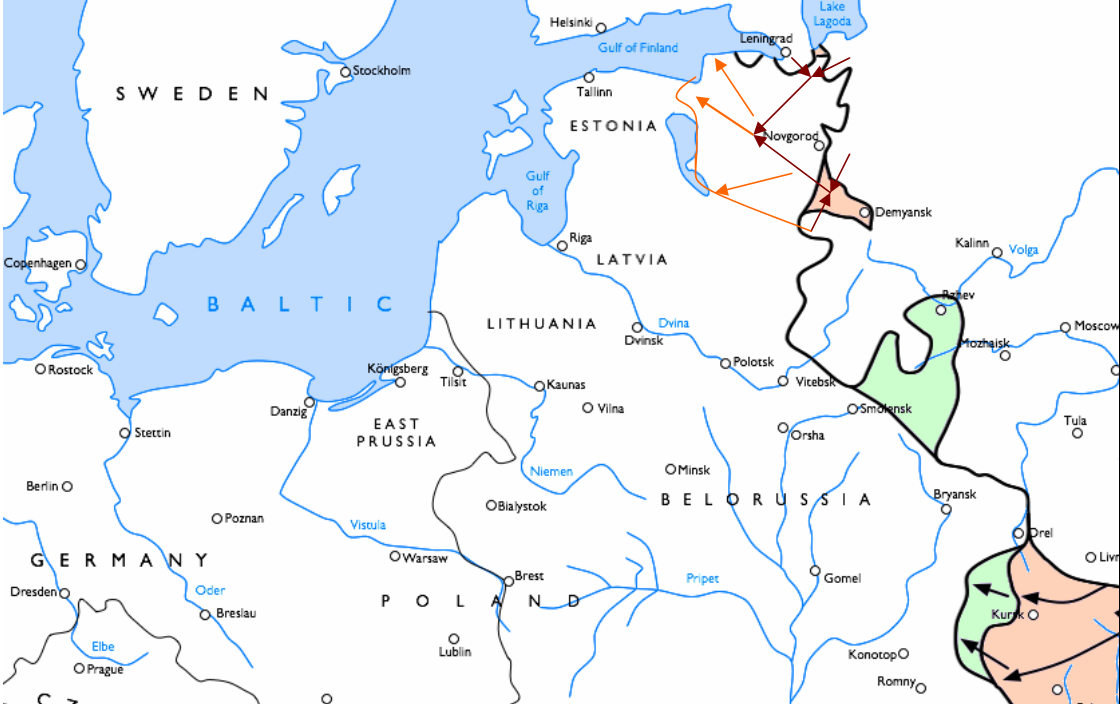
- Soviet plan for Operation Polar Star in the context of the wider offensive in the northern and central parts of the front.
Date	10 February 1943 – 1 April 1943
Location	Southern shore of Lake Ladoga, near present-day Saint Petersburg and near Demyansk, Russia
Result	German victory
Territorial changes	Soviet forces recapture Demyansk salient but fail to lift the siege of Leningrad from the south

Belligerents
(Nazi Germany) Germany	Soviet Union

Commanders and leaders
(Nazi Germany) Georg von Küchler	(Soviet Union) Georgy Zhukov

Units involved
Army Group North	Leningrad Front; Volkhov Front; Northwestern Front

Operation Polar Star (Russian: Операция Полярная звезда, Operatsia Polyarnaya Zvezda) was an operation conducted by the Soviet Leningrad, Volkhov and Northwestern Fronts in February and March 1943. The operation was planned by Georgy Zhukov in the wake of the successful Operation Iskra and envisaged two separate encirclements. One was to be carried out in the north by the Leningrad and Volkhov Fronts near Mga and one was planned to be carried out further to the south, by the Northwestern Front, near Demyansk.

The operation succeeded in recapturing the Demyansk salient but failed to encircle the German forces. The northern part of the operation failed, without gaining much ground. With the battles in the south near Kharkov and, later, Kursk using reinforcements for both sides, the frontline near Leningrad stabilised until July 1943.

== Battle ==
The German's successful evacuation of the Demyansk salient before the battle shortened the frontline enough to build several new defensive lines, bringing the eventual Soviet offensive to a halt. Although Zhukov made several attempts to reinvigorate the offensive throughout March, it was clear his fronts were too exhausted to advance further. The spring thaw marked the end of major battles on the Eastern Front until July. The defences of Army Group North were later broken in January 1944, during the Leningrad–Novgorod Offensive.

The relative failure of the operation compared to successes at the Battle of Stalingrad or Operation Bagration, resulted in silence on the topic after the war. Neither Zhukov's or Meretskov's memoirs make any mention of the operation or even of any specific fighting in the area after 18 January, the day the blockade of Leningrad finally ended. Zhukov's memoirs include only a short mention of the recapture of the Demyansk salient without any word on his role on the operation and then quickly focuses upon the Battle of Kursk.

Army Group North, despite holding the line, was not in a good position. With other endangered fronts a priority for the Heer and with the Continuation War ending hostilities north of Leningrad, Group North was increasingly isolated and stretched thin. The end of the blockade of Leningrad moreover, increased the armament strength of previously isolated Soviet forces. The army group's strength would continue to drop throughout 1943, while the opposing Soviet forces would grow in strength. The growing disparity in strength eventually allowed new offenses to break the German line in 1944.
