= Operation Iskra =

1943 Soviet WWII military operation

- Part of the siege of Leningrad
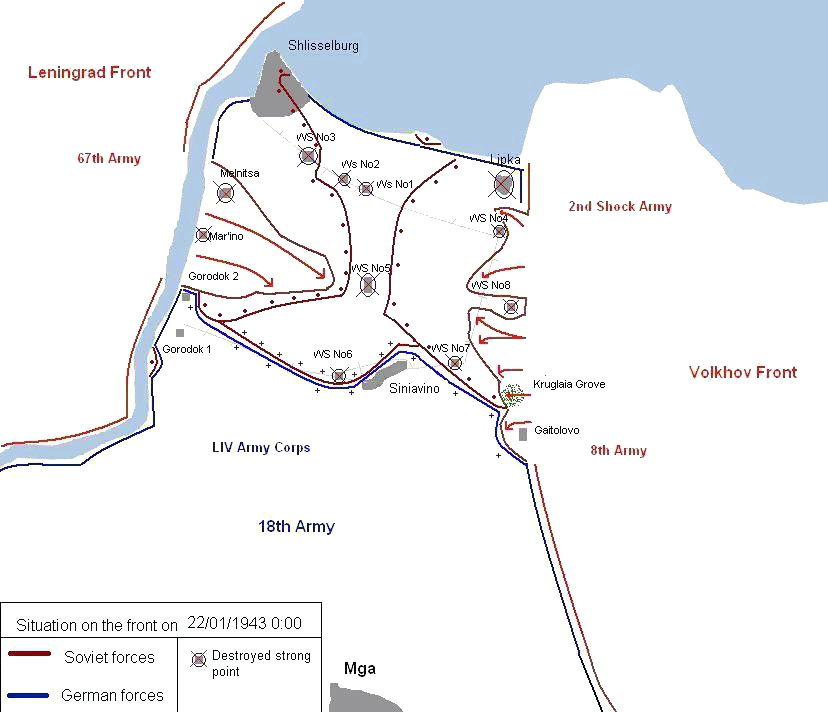
- Front lines late January showing the efforts to displace the 18th Army (bottom) and link up the encircled Leningrad Front (left) with the Volkhov Front (right)
Date	12–30 January 1943
Location	South of Lake Ladoga 59.9000°N 31.0675°E
Result	Soviet victory

Belligerents
Germany	Soviet Union

Commanders and leaders
Georg Lindemann	Kirill Meretskov; Leonid Govorov

Units involved
18th Army	2nd Shock Army; 8th Army; 67th Army

Strength
26 divisions; 700 artillery; 50 tanks	20 divisions; 15 brigades; 4,600 artillery; 500 tanks; 900 aircraft

Casualties and losses
8,905 to 45,570 casualties	Krivosheev's official soviet data: 33,940 killed; 71,142 wounded

Operation Iskra (Russian: операция Искра, lit. 'Operation Spark'), a Soviet military operation in January 1943 during World War II, aimed to break the Wehrmacht's siege of Leningrad. Planning for the operation began shortly after the failure of the Sinyavino Offensive. The German defeat in the Battle of Stalingrad in late 1942 had weakened the German front. By January 1943, Soviet forces were planning or conducting offensive operations across the entire German-Soviet Front, especially in southern Russia; Iskra formed the northern part of the wider Soviet 1942–1943 winter counteroffensive.

The operation was conducted by the Red Army's Leningrad Front, Volkhov Front, and the Baltic Fleet from 12 to 30 January 1943 with the aim of creating a land connection to Leningrad. Soviet forces linked up on 18 January, and by 22 January, the front line had stabilised. The operation successfully opened a land corridor 8–10 km (5.0–6.2 mi) wide to the city. A railroad was swiftly built through the corridor and allowed more supplies to reach the city than the Road of Life, across the frozen surface of Lake Ladoga, which significantly reduced the possibilities of the capture of the city and of any German–Finnish linkup.

The success led to Operation Polyarnaya Zvezda less than two weeks later, which aimed to decisively defeat Army Group North and to lift the siege altogether. Polyarnaya Zvezda failed by achieving only minimal progress. Soviet forces made several other attempts in 1943 to renew their offensive and to lift the siege completely, but they made only modest gains in each one. The corridor remained within range of German artillery, and the Red Army did not finally lift the siege until a year later, on 27 January 1944.

== Background ==
The siege of Leningrad started in early autumn 1941. By 8 September 1941, German and Finnish forces had surrounded the city, cutting off all supply routes to Leningrad and its suburbs. However, the original drive on the city failed and the city was subjected to a siege. During 1942 several attempts were made to breach the blockade but all failed. The last such attempt was the Sinyavino Offensive. After the defeat of the Sinyavino Offensive, the front line returned to what it was before the offensive and again 16 km (9.9 mi) separated Leonid Govorov's Leningrad Front in the city from Kirill Meretskov's Volkhov Front.

Despite the failures of earlier operations, lifting the siege of Leningrad was a very high priority, so new offensive preparations began in November 1942. In December, the operation was approved by the Stavka and received the codename "Iskra" (Spark). The operation was due to begin in January 1943.

By January 1943, conditions were improving for the Soviets. The German defeat in the Battle of Stalingrad had weakened the German front. The Soviet forces were planning or conducting offensive operations across the entire front, especially in southwestern Russia. Amidst these conditions, Operation Iskra was to become the first of several offensive operations aimed at inflicting a decisive defeat on Germany's Army Group North.

== Preparations ==
The area south of Lake Ladoga is heavily forested, with many wetlands (especially peat deposits) close to the lake. The forest shielded both sides from visual observation. Both factors greatly hindered the mobility of artillery and vehicles in the area, providing a considerable advantage to the defending forces. The Sinyavino heights were a key location, with terrain 150 m (490 ft) higher than the surrounding flat terrain. Because the front line had changed very little since the blockade was established, German forces had built an extensive network of interconnected trenches and obstacles, interlocking artillery and mortar fire. The Neva River was partially frozen, allowing infantry to cross.

=== German preparations ===
The Germans were well aware that breaking the blockade was very important for the Soviet side. However, due to the reverse at Stalingrad and the Soviet offensive at Velikiye Luki to the south of Leningrad, Army Group North was ordered to go on the defensive and was stripped of many troops. The 11th Army, which was to lead the assault on Leningrad in September 1942, and which had thwarted the last Soviet offensive, was transferred to Army Group Center in October. Nine other divisions were also reassigned to other sectors.

At the start of the Soviet offensive, the German 18th Army, led by Georg Lindemann consisted of 26 divisions spread across a 450 km (280 mi) wide front. The army was stretched very thin and as a result had no division-level reserves. Instead, each division had a tactical reserve of one or two battalions, and the army reserves consisted of portions of the 96th Infantry Division and the 5th Mountain Division. The 1st Air Fleet provided the air support for the army.

Five divisions and part of another one were guarding the narrow corridor which separated the Soviet Leningrad and Volkhov Fronts. The corridor was only 16 km (9.9 mi) wide and was called the "bottleneck". The German divisions were well fortified in this area, where the front line had been virtually unchanged since September 1941, and hoping to repel the Soviet offensive.

=== Soviet preparations ===
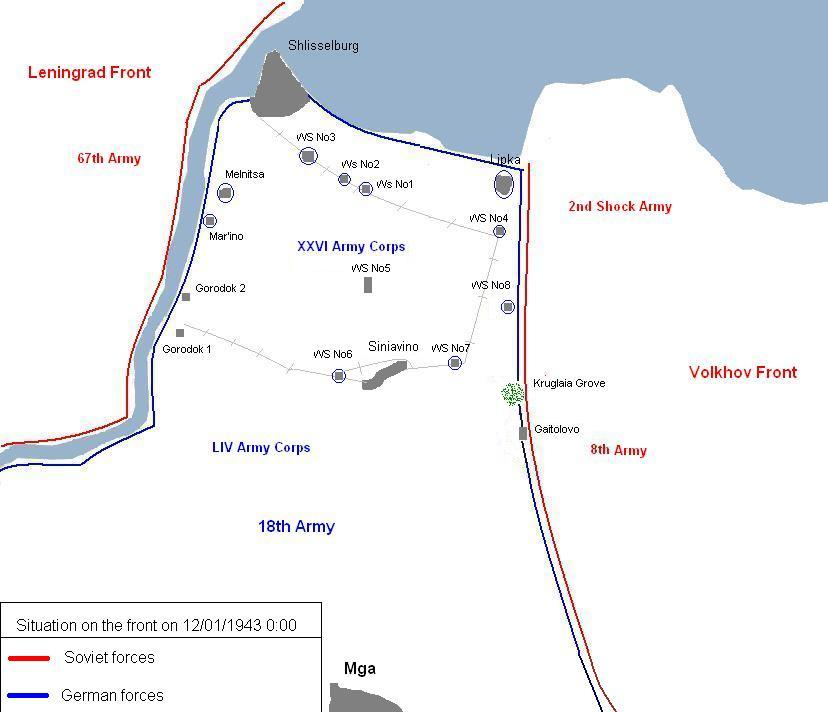
Situation on front on 11 January

The plan for Operation Iskra was approved in December.

With the combined efforts of the Volkhov and Leningrad Fronts, defeat the enemy in the area of Lipka, Gaitolovo, Dubrovka, Shlisselburg, and thus penetrate the Leningrad blockade. Finish the operation by the end of January 1943.

This meant recapturing the "bottleneck" and opening a 10 km (6.2 mi) corridor to Leningrad. After that, the two fronts were to rest for 10 days and resume the offensive southward in further operations.

The biggest difference from the earlier Sinyavino Offensive was the location of the main attack. In September 1942 the Soviet forces were attacking south of the town of Siniavino, which allowed them to potentially encircle several German divisions, but also left the army open to flanking attacks from the north, and it was this which ultimately caused the offensive to fail. In January 1943 the offensive was conducted north of Siniavino, closer to the Ladoga Lake shore, which removed the threat of flanking attacks and increased the probability of success, but forced the Soviets to abandon the idea of encircling most of the German forces in the "bottleneck".

The offensive was to be conducted by Leningrad Front's 67th Army and Volkhov Front's 2nd Shock Army commanded by Major General M.P. Dukhanov and Lieutenant General V.Z. Romanovsky respectively. The 8th Army, commanded by Lieutenant General F.N. Starikov, was to conduct a limited offensive on the 2nd Shock Army's flank and defend elsewhere. 13th and 14th Air Armies provided air support.

The two fronts spent December training and preparing for the offensive, and received significant reinforcements. These included not just replenishment and additional rifle divisions and brigades, but also significant additional artillery and engineer units, which were vital for breaching the heavy German defenses. Specialized winter units included three ski brigades and four aerosani battalions. To ensure the Soviet forces had air superiority, which they had lacked in the previous offensive, the air strength in the area was increased to a total of over 800 planes, predominantly fighters. Large tank forces could not operate well in the swampy terrain, so the tank forces were used primarily as battalions reinforcing divisions or slightly larger brigades, which were to operate independently.

Originally the operation was due to begin on 1 January, but poor ice conditions on the Neva caused the offensive to be delayed until 12 January. A number of measures were taken to prevent the details of the operation being revealed to the Germans. Only a limited number of senior officers were involved in the planning, all redeployments took place in bad weather or at night and simulated attack preparations were made elsewhere to confuse the German side.

On January 10, Stavka sent Georgy Zhukov as its representative to coordinate the battle. The rifle divisions occupied their jumping-off positions on 11 January, and first echelon tanks moved into their advanced positions early on 12 January.

== Battle ==
=== Start of the battle ===
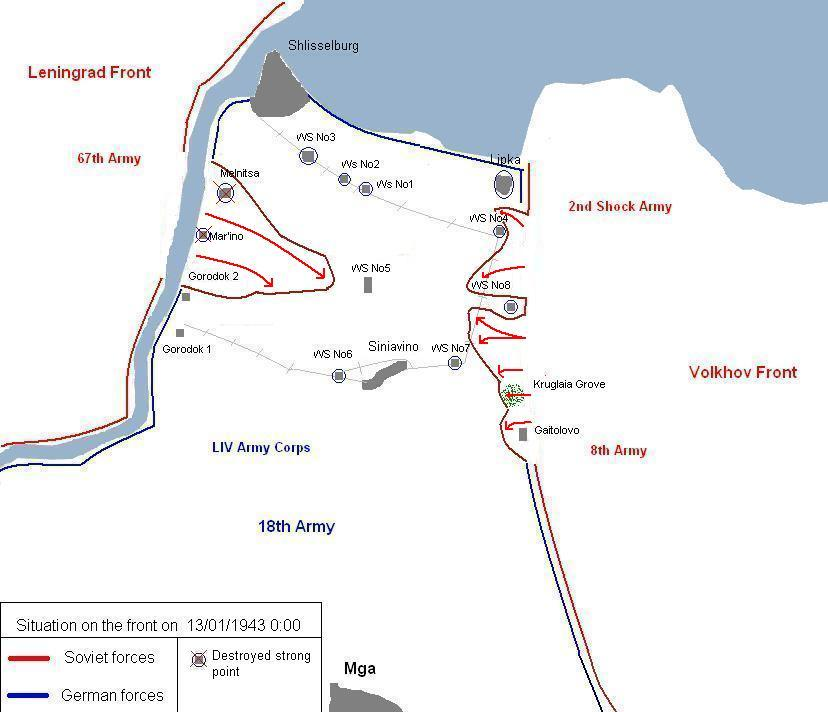
Soviet advance on 12 January

The night before the start of the operations, Soviet night bombers attacked the German divisional headquarters and artillery positions to disrupt German command and control. The bombers also attacked airfields and communication centres to disrupt the flow of reinforcements. Operation Iskra began at 9:30 on 12 January, when the two Soviet fronts began their artillery preparation, which lasted for nearly two and a half hours on the western side and nearly two hours on the eastern side of the bottleneck. The Soviet attack started five minutes before the artillery preparation finished with a Katyusha barrage, to fully exploit its effects.

The Leningrad Front forces achieved their greatest success between Shlisselburg and Gorodok 1 when the Soviet 136th and 268th Rifle Divisions with supporting tanks and artillery captured a bridgehead approximately 5 km (3.1 mi) wide and 3 km (1.9 mi) deep. At 18:00, the sappers constructed bridges near Mar'ino to allow second echelon troops to advance. The attack further north at Shlisselburg failed, and attacks further south near Gorodok only resulted in the capture of the first line of German trenches. By evening, the Front command decided to exploit the formed bridgehead and troops attacking Shlisselburg across the Neva were redeployed across the river to attack it from the south.

The Volkhov Front attack saw less success as the forces of the 2nd Shock Army managed to envelop but not destroy the German strong points at Lipka and Workers Settlement No. 8. The latter was an impressive defensive position with a garrison of 700 men and 16 bunkers. Heavy flanking fire from these strong points prevented any further advance, but the 2nd Shock Army penetrated the German defenses 2 km (1.2 mi) between these points. Further south, between Workers Settlement No. 8 and Kruglaya Grove, the advance was 1–2 km (0.62–1.24 mi) deep, while even further south, the flanking attacks by the 8th Army only managed to capture the first line of German trenches.

The German side reacted by deploying their reserves to the region throughout the night. One improvised battle group consisting of five battalions from the 96th Infantry Division, supported by artillery and four Tiger tanks, moved to Gorodok No. 2 to reinforce the 170th Infantry Division to the west. Another similar battle group using battalions from the 96th Infantry Division was sent to Workers Settlement No. 1 to support the 227th Infantry Division.

=== Soviet advance ===
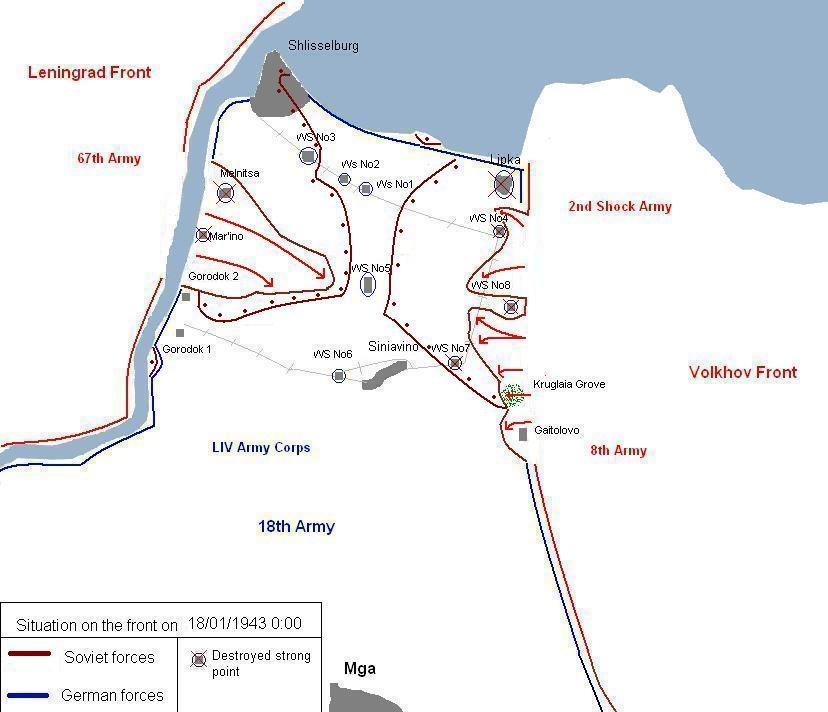
Soviet advance by 18 January

The next five days saw very heavy fighting as the Soviets slowly advanced through heavy German defences and repelled German counterattacks. On 13 January, bad weather prevented the Soviet side from employing their air force. That day they gained almost no ground and incurred heavy losses. The German side, after their counterattacks had failed to throw back the Soviet troops, started further reinforcing the area by assembling battle groups using portions of divisions from the quiet parts of the front. These included battle groups from the 1st Infantry Division, the 61st Infantry Division, the 5th Mountain Division and the SS Police Division.

On 14 January, the weather improved enough to allow air support again and the Soviet advance resumed, albeit at a slow pace. To speed up the encirclement of the strong point at Lipka, the Soviet side used the 12th Ski Brigade which crossed the ice of the Ladoga Lake and attacked the German rear lines. By the end of the day the German forces in the Lipka and Shlisselburg areas were almost completely cut off from the rest of the German forces.

From 15 to 17 January, the Soviet fronts fought towards each other, capturing the strong points at Workers Settlements Nos. 3, 4, 7, 8, and most of Shlisselburg. By the end of 17 January they were only 1.5–2 km (0.93–1.24 mi) apart between Workers Settlements Nos. 1 and 5. On 15 January, Govorov was promoted to Colonel General.

=== Linkup and land corridor ===
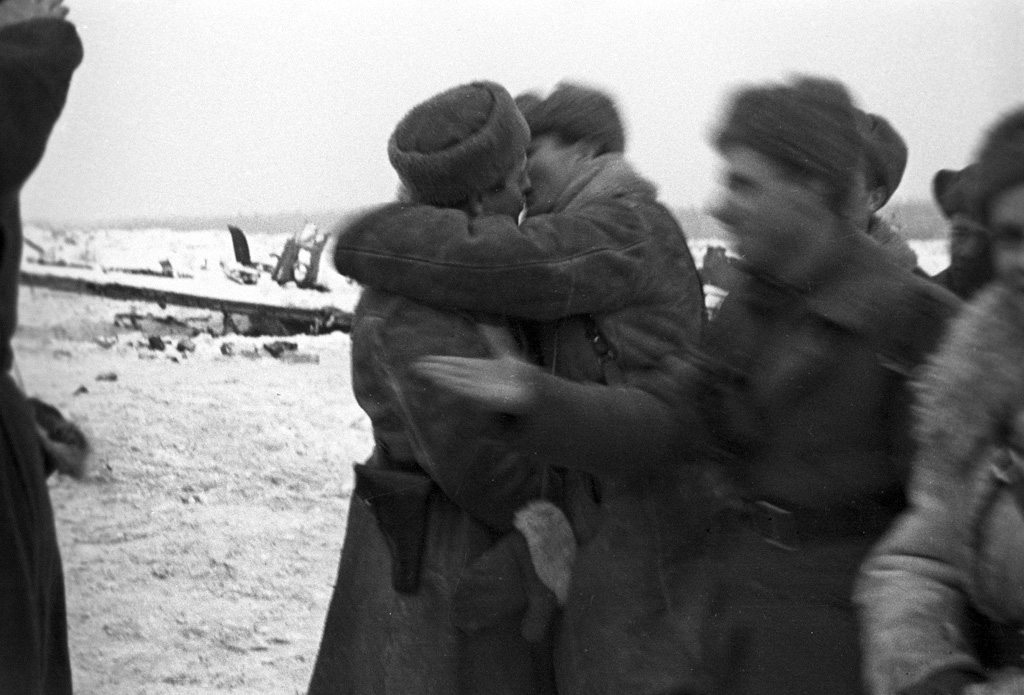
Joining of Leningrad and Volkhov Fronts

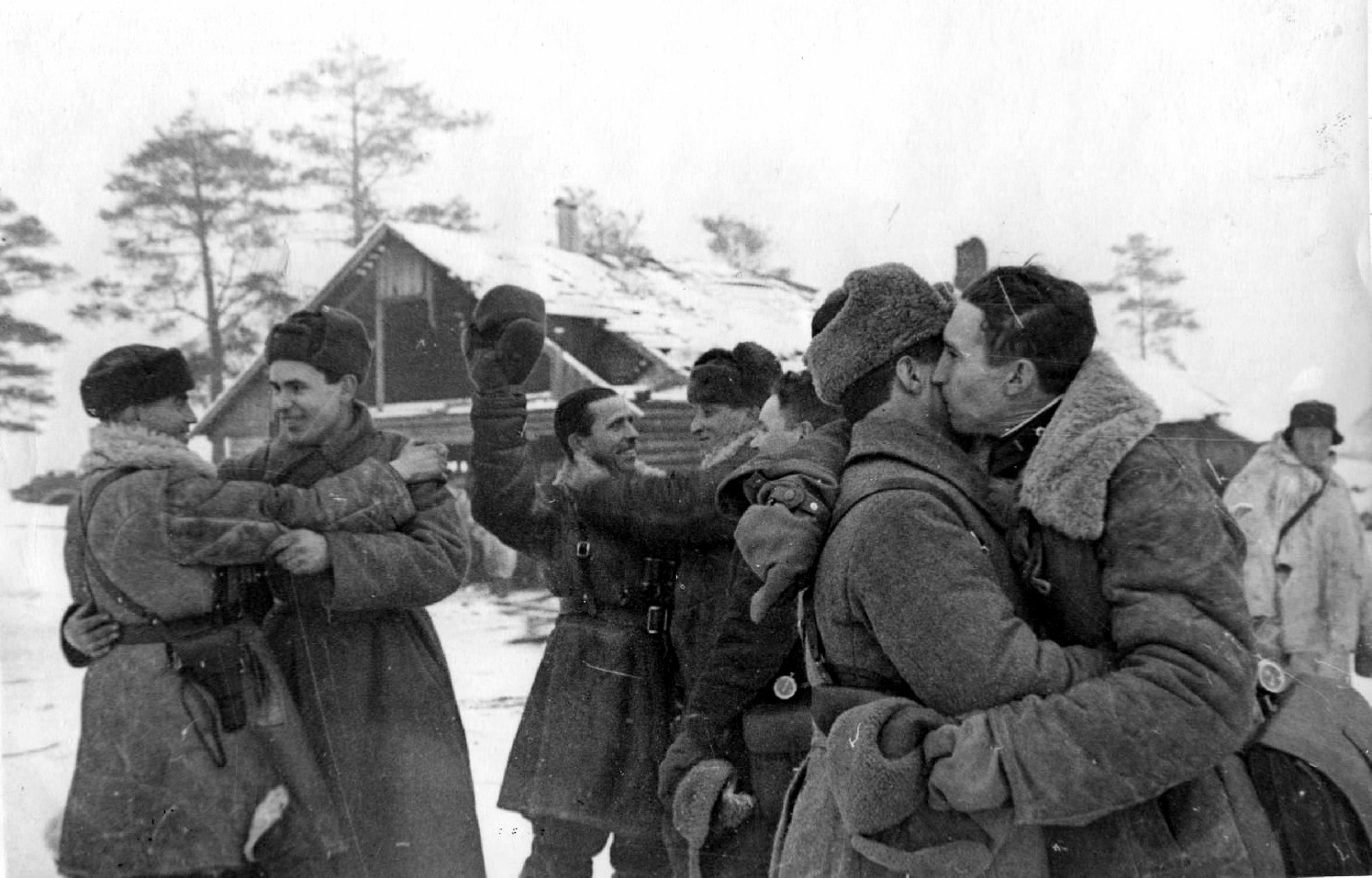
The linkup of the fronts at Workers Settlement No. 1

On 18 January, at 9:30, the lead elements from the 67th Army's 123rd Rifle Division and 2nd Shock Army's 372nd Rifle Division linked up near Workers Settlement No. 1, thus technically breaking the blockade and marking an important date in the Siege of Leningrad.

German forces north of the settlement were cut off. Group Huhner, made up of two battle groups under Lieutenant General Huhner, commander of the 61st Infantry Division, was supposed to hold the corridor between Workers Settlements Nos. 1 and 5 but was no longer able to do it. Later that day the Soviet forces captured Workers Settlement No. 5 after repelling a strong German counterattack. The lead elements from the 67th Army's 136th Rifle Division and 2nd Shock Army's 18th Rifle Division linked up to the north of the settlement at 11:45. Group Huhner became cut off too and was ordered to break out through the forested area toward Siniavino before the main Soviet forces arrived and made a breakout impossible. Group Huhner abandoned its artillery and heavy equipment, and ran "the gauntlet of fire" before reaching Siniavino on 19 January. The breakout was costly for both sides. By early afternoon, the Soviet forces cleared Shlisselburg and Lipka of German forces and started liquidating the forces remaining in the forests south of Lake Ladoga.

From 19 to 21 January, the Soviet forces eliminated the encircled German forces and tried to expand their offensive southward towards Siniavino. However, the 18th Army significantly reinforced its positions there with the SS Police, 21st Infantry, and soon after the 11th Infantry and 28th Jäger Divisions. The Soviet forces captured Workers Settlement No. 6 but were unable to advance any further.

=== Front line stabilises, railway construction ===
There were no changes in the front line after 21 January as a result of Operation Iskra. The Soviet forces were unable to advance any further, and instead started fortifying the area to thwart any German attempt at re-establishing the blockade. On 21 January, work started on the rail line linking Leningrad to the rest of the country through the captured corridor. The plan from the State Defense Committee written on 18 January, ordered the construction to be finished in 20 days. The work was completed ahead of schedule and trains began delivering supplies on 6 February. The operation officially ended on 30 January.

== Aftermath ==
Operation Iskra was a strategic victory for the Soviet forces. From a military perspective, the operation eliminated the possibility of the capture of the city and a German–Finnish link up, as the Leningrad Front was now very well supplied, reinforced and able to co-operate more closely with the Volkhov Front. For the civilian population, the operation meant that more food was able to reach the city, as well as improved conditions and the possibility of evacuating more civilians from the city. Breaking the blockade also had a significant strategic effect, although that was overshadowed by the surrender of the German 6th Army at Stalingrad only a few days later. Notably, the first Tiger tank captured by the Soviets was taken during this battle. It was undamaged and evacuated by the Soviet forces for evaluation.

The victory led to promotions for Govorov, who was promoted to colonel-general on 15 January, and Zhukov, who was promoted to Marshal of the Soviet Union on 18 January. In addition, Govorov and Meretskov were awarded the Order of Suvorov 1st Class on 28 January. The 136th and 327th Rifle Divisions were awarded the designation of 63rd and 64th Guards Rifle Divisions, while the 61st Tank Brigade was designated the 30th Guards Tank Brigade.

For the German side, the battle left the 18th Army very stretched and exhausted. Lacking sufficient reinforcements, the command of Army Group North made the decision to shorten the front line by evacuating the Demyansk Pocket salient. The salient had been held throughout 1942, despite being encircled for a few months, as it was an important strategic bridgehead. Together with the Rzhev salient (which was also evacuated in spring 1943), it could potentially be used to encircle a large number of Soviet forces. However, in the situation that had developed, retaining it was no longer possible.

Nevertheless, Stavka knew that Operation Iskra was incomplete, as the corridor it had opened was narrow and was still in range of the German artillery, and the important heights and strong point at Sinyavino remained under German control. This led Zhukov to plan Operation Polar Star (Operatsia Polyarnaya Zvezda). This much more ambitious offensive operation aimed to decisively defeat Army Group North, but faltered early on. The Soviet forces carried out several other offensives in the area in 1943, slowly expanding the corridor, making other small gains before finally capturing Siniavino in September. However, the city was still subjected to at least a partial siege as well as air and artillery bombardment until January 1944, when the Leningrad-Novgorod offensive broke through the German lines, lifting the siege completely.
