= Operation Nordlicht (1942) =

Proposed German operation in Leningrad

Coordinates: 59.9075°N 31.0836°E

Operation Nordlicht (German, 'Northern Light') was devised by the German high command, the Oberkommando des Heeres ("High Command of the Army") after a year-long battle for Leningrad when Adolf Hitler ordered a final assault on the besieged city. The main objective of the operation was to capture Leningrad using forces of Army Group North under Field Marshal Georg von Küchler, and thereby bring an end to the siege and free up hundreds of thousands of troops. Meanwhile, the Germans were also preparing for the Battle of Stalingrad. Both attacks on Leningrad in the North and on Stalingrad in the South were synchronized by the Germans so as to confuse the Soviets.

Operation Nordlicht was to begin on 23 August 1942 with a massive artillery bombardment of Leningrad, following with aerial bombardments by the Luftwaffe. But when the Soviets launched the Sinyavino Offensive on 19 August, the forces that were intended to be used for Nordlicht were transferred from the planned offensive to the defense of the German lines. Although the Sinyavino Offensive was a failure, it caused the Germans to cancel their operation and they were never able to launch an offensive against Leningrad again.
