= Leningrad–Novgorod offensive =

1944 military operation

- Part of the Eastern Front of World War II
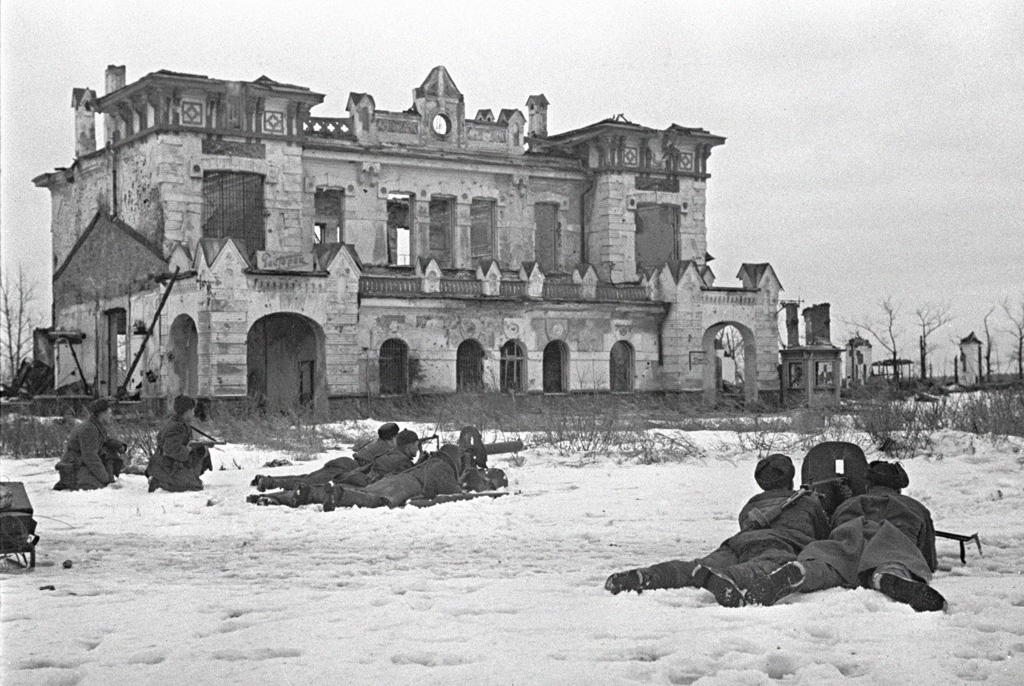
- Soviet machine-gunners near Detskoye Selo railway station in Pushkin, 21 January
Date	14 January – 1 March 1944
Location	Southern Leningrad region, Novgorod, Pskov and Narva
Result	Soviet victory
Territorial changes	Recapture of the region by Soviets

Belligerents
(Nazi Germany) Germany	Soviet Union

Commanders and leaders
(Nazi Germany) Georg von Küchler (Until 1 February) (Nazi Germany) Walter Model (From February 1)	(Soviet Union) Leonid Govorov (Soviet Union) Vladimir Tributs (Soviet Union) Kirill Meretskov (Soviet Union) Markian Popov

Units involved
Army Group North: 44 infantry divisions	Leningrad Front; Volkhov Front; 2nd Baltic Front; Baltic Fleet: 57 divisions

Strength
500,000 personnel 2,389 artillery pieces 146 tanks 140 aircraft	822,000 personnel 4,600 artillery pieces 550 tanks 653 aircraft

Casualties and losses
24,739 dead and missing 46,912 wounded Total: 71,651 casualties (per German military medical reports)	76,686 dead and missing, 237,267 wounded Total: 313,953 casualties

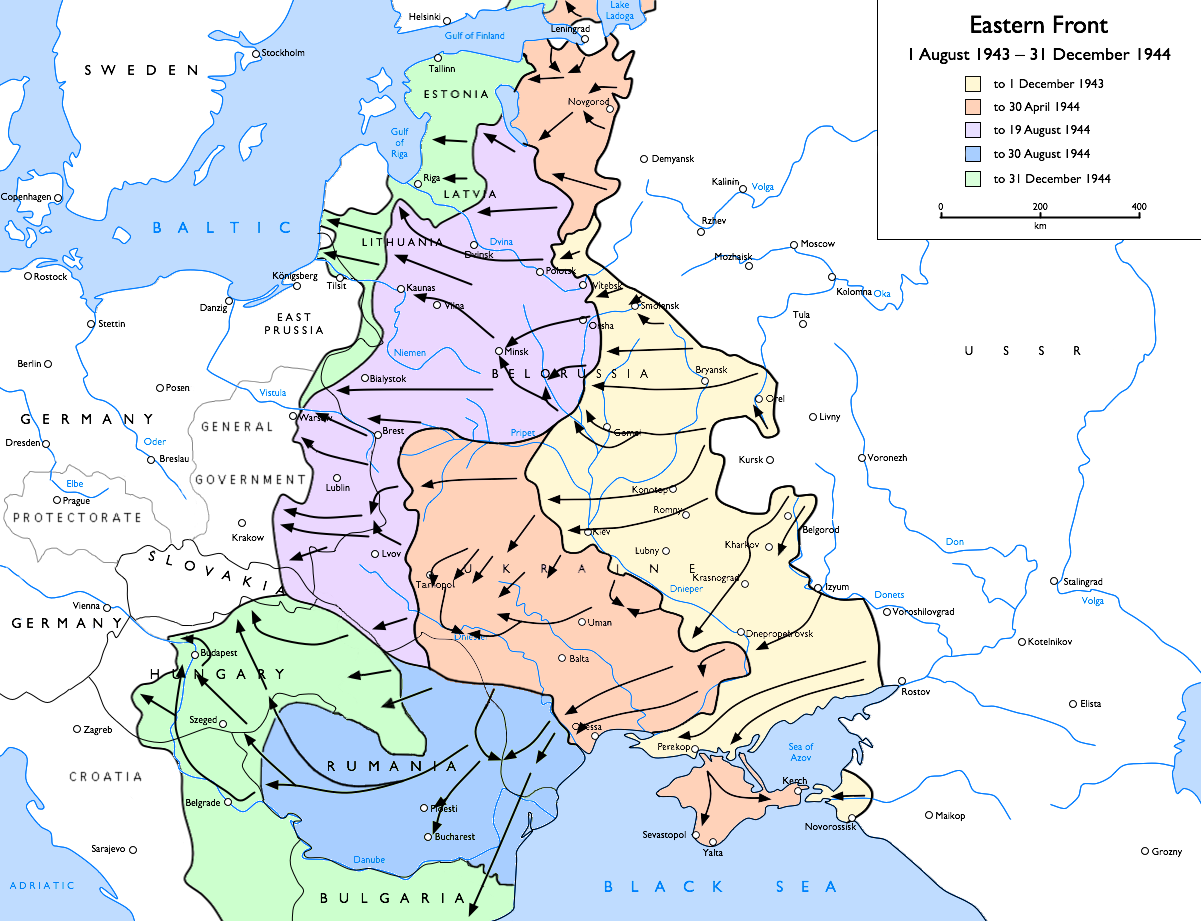
Soviet gains, mid-1943 to end of 1944

The Leningrad–Novgorod strategic offensive was a strategic offensive during World War II. It was launched by the Red Army on 14 January 1944 with an attack on the German Army Group North by the Soviet Volkhov and Leningrad fronts, along with part of the 2nd Baltic Front, with a goal of fully lifting the siege of Leningrad. Approximately two weeks later, the Red Army regained control of the Moscow–Leningrad railway, and on 26 January 1944 Joseph Stalin declared that the siege of Leningrad was lifted, and that German forces were expelled from the Leningrad Oblast. The lifting of the 900-day-long blockade was celebrated in Leningrad on that day with a 324-gun salute. The strategic offensive ended a month later on 1 March, when Stavka ordered the troops of the Leningrad Front to a follow-on operation across the Narva River, while the 2nd Baltic was to defend the territory it gained in pursuit of the German XVI Army Corps.

The Germans had suffered nearly 72,000 casualties, lost 85 artillery pieces ranging in caliber from 15 cm to 40 cm, and were pushed back between 60 and 100 kilometers from Leningrad to the Luga River.

== Background ==
After Operation Barbarossa, German troops had encircled Leningrad, and began the siege of Leningrad. Several operations had been designed by the Soviet commanders in the area to liberate the outskirts of Leningrad from the Germans. In the fall of 1943, preparations had begun to design another plan to retake the outskirts of Leningrad from the Germans, after the only partially successful Operation Iskra in January that year which had followed the failed Sinyavino Offensive of late 1942. The first staff meeting was held on 9 September 1943, two years and a day after the beginning of the siege. Two plans, Neva I and Neva II, were conceived. Neva I was to be implemented if the Germans, pressured on different fronts, withdrew their forces from Leningrad on their own accord to reinforce the pressured areas. Both Stavka and Leningrad believed this was possible. Neva II, therefore, would be implemented if the Germans did not withdraw from Leningrad within the coming months. The offensive would be three-pronged, driving from the foothold at Oranienbaum that had been captured earlier that year, the Pulkovo Heights and from the fortifications around Novgorod. The offensive was planned to start in the winter, when sufficient numbers of troops and artillery could be moved across the ice without incident.

== Preparations ==
=== Soviet ===
The Baltic Fleet had been assigned the task of transporting the Second Shock Army under the command of Ivan Fedyuninsky over Lake Ladoga to Oranienbaum. From 5 November 1943, onwards the Fleet transported 30,000 troops, 47 tanks, 400 artillery pieces, 1,400 trucks and 10,000 tons of ammunition and supplies from the wharves at the Leningrad factories, Kanat and the naval base at Lisy Nos to Oranienbaum. After Lake Ladoga froze, another 22,000 men, 800 trucks, 140 tanks and 380 guns were sent overland to the jump-off point. When the shipments were complete, the artillery was positioned along the entire length of the Leningrad, Second Baltic and Volkhov fronts at a concentration of 200 guns per kilometer, including 21,600 standard artillery pieces, 1,500 Katyusha rocket guns, and 600 anti-aircraft guns. 1,500 planes were also obtained from the Baltic Fleet and from installations around Leningrad. The total number of Soviet personnel prepared for action was 1,241,000, against 741,000 German troops. A final meeting took place on 11 January in Smolny. General Govorov, the top Soviet commander on the Leningrad Front, had listed his priorities. In order to open up southeastward and eastward main railroad lines from Leningrad, Soviet troops would have to occupy Gatchina, from which they could retake Mga, the minor city and rail station whose capture in 1941 had closed the last railroad route into Leningrad. Govorov positioned his troops accordingly.

=== German ===
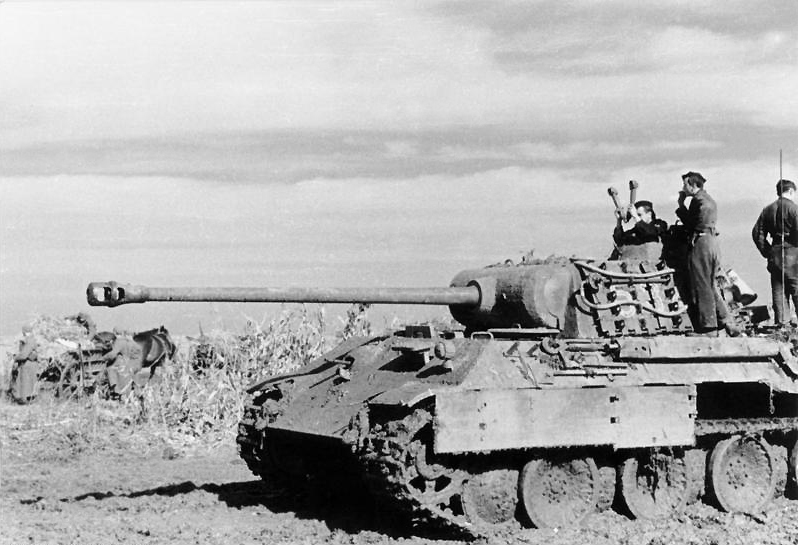
Panther on the Eastern Front, 1944

The situation of the German Army Group North at the end of 1943 had deteriorated to a critical point. The Spanish Blue Division and three German divisions had been withdrawn by October, while the Army Group had acquired 100 km of additional frontage from Army Group Center during the same period. As replacements, Field Marshal Georg von Küchler received the Spanish Blue Legion and three divisions of SS troops. In such a weakened state, the Army Group staff planned a new position to its rear that would shorten the front lines by twenty-five percent and remove the Soviet threats posed in many salients on the current lines. The plan Operation Blue called for a January withdrawal of over 240 km to the natural defensive barrier formed by the Narva and Velikaya Rivers and Lakes Peipus and Pskov. This position, the so-called "Panther Line", was buttressed by fortifications that had been constructed since September. The retreat would be carried out in stages, using intermediate defensive positions, the most important of which was the Rollbahn Line formed on the October Railway running through Tosno, Lyuban and Chudovo. There the two most exposed Army Corps, the XXVI and XXVIII, would regroup and catch their breath before proceeding farther back to their positions in the Panther Line.

The fate of Army Group North turned for the worse in the new year, for Hitler rejected all proposals for an early withdrawal into the "Panther" position, insisting that the Soviet forces be kept as far as possible from Germany and that they be forced to pay dearly for each meter of ground. Finally, Hitler transferred three more first-rate infantry divisions out of Army Group North to reinforce Erich von Manstein's Army Group South as it reeled back from the Dnieper River under continuous Soviet assault. Field Marshal von Küchler now held an extremely precarious position, and could only await events on the Leningrad and Volkhov Fronts with great pessimism.

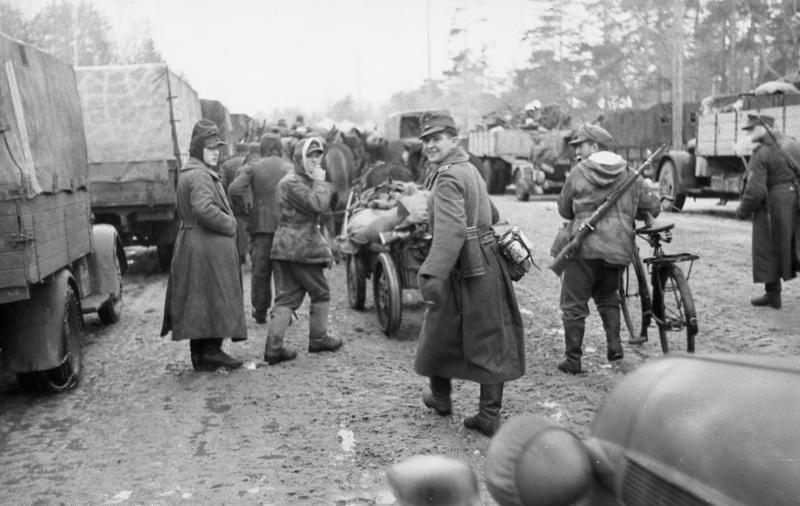
On a connecting road between Lake Ilmen and the Gulf of Finland

== Combat activity ==
=== Krasnoye Selo–Ropsha offensive: 14–31 January 1944 ===
In the late hours of 13 January 1944 long-range bombers from the Baltic Fleet attacked the main German command points on the defensive line. On 14 January troops from both the Oranienbaum foothold and Volkhov Front attacked, followed the next day by troops of the 42nd Army under the command of Ivan Maslennikov from the Pulkovo Heights. An artillery barrage was launched all along the front, laying down 220,000 shells onto the German lines. Fog inhibited major progress for the first few days, although the Second Shock Army and 42nd Army advanced two miles on a seven-mile front while in combat with the 9th and 10th Luftwaffe Field Divisions, and the Volkhov Front pushed the Germans back about three miles. It thawed on the 16th, and the Second Shock Army managed to move forward 23 kilometers. On the 19th, the Second Shock Army captured Ropsha and the 63rd Guards Rifle Division, part of the 42nd Army, drove the Germans out of Krasnoye Selo. By 26 January German troops had been pushed 100 kilometers away from the city, and the Moscow–Leningrad Railroad line had been opened. The next day, Stalin declared the city to have been relieved, and Leningrad celebrated with a red, white and blue salute from 324 Katyusha rocket launchers and artillery pieces at 8 pm, which was inconceivable during the siege due to blackout.

=== Novgorod–Luga offensive : 14 January – 15 February 1944 ===
On 14 January Soviet troops of the Volkhov Front launched an offensive from the Novgorod area towards Luga against a part of the 18th German Army. The aim was freeing the October Railway and encircling, together with the troops of the Leningrad Front, the main forces of the 18th Army in the Luga region.

The offensive did not develop as rapidly as planned before the operation. The German 18th Army suffered a heavy defeat, but still wasn't destroyed and retained a significant part of its combat potential, which prevented the Soviet troops in the spring of 1944 to break through the Panther–Wotan line and begin the liberation of the Baltics. One of the reasons for this development was the lack of coordination between the 2nd Baltic Front and the Volkhov Front, which allowed the German command to move significant forces from the 16th Army to the Luga area.

By 15 February the troops of the Volkhov Front, as well as the 42nd and 67th Army of the Leningrad Front, reached Lake Peipus, having pushed the enemy 50–120 kilometers to the west. In total 779 cities and settlements were liberated, including Novgorod, Luga, Batetsky, Oredezh, Mga, Tosno, Lyuban and Chudovo. The restoration of control over the strategically important railways, especially Kirov and October, was of great importance.

=== Staraya Russa–Novorzhev offensive : 18 February – 1 March 1944 ===
On 18 February, Soviet troops of the 2nd Baltic Front, carried out this operation in cooperation with part of the Leningrad Front against the German 16th Army of Army Group "North" with the aim of liberating the area southwest of Lake Ilmen and creating the conditions for further offensives.

As a result of the operation, the Soviet troops, pursuing the retreating enemy, advanced up to 180 kilometers to the west, liberating many cities and towns, including Staraya Russa, Novorzhev, Dno and Putoshka.

=== Overview ===
Position of the armies before the operation and plan of attack	Operations between 14 and 31 January 1944	Operations between 1 and 15 February 1944

== Aftermath ==
In Soviet propaganda, this offensive was listed as one of Stalin's ten blows.

== Bibliography ==
- Glantz, David M.; House, Jonathan M. (1995). When Titans Clashed. How the Red Army Stopped Hitler. University Press of Kansas. ISBN 0-7006-2120-2.
- Glantz, David M. (2002). The Battle for Leningrad 1941–1944. University Press of Kansas. ISBN 0-7006-1208-4.
- Salisbury, Harrison Evans (1969). The 900 Days: The Siege of Leningrad. Da Capo Press. ISBN 0-306-81298-3.
- Гречанюк, Н.М.; Дмитриев, В.И.; Корниенко, А.И. (1990). Дважды, Краснознаменный Балтийский Флот (Baltic Fleet). Воениздат.
- Кривошеев, Григорий; Андроников, Владимир; Буриков, Петр (2010-03-25). Россия и СССР в войнах XX века: Книга Потерь. Moscow, Russia: Вече.
