= Sapyornoye =

Rural locality in Priozersky District, Russia

Coordinates: 60°42′N 29°56′E

Sapyornoye (Russian: Сапёрное; Finnish: Valkjärvi) is a rural locality (a logging depot settlement) in Priozersky District of Leningrad Oblast, located on the Karelian Isthmus. Population: 3,647 (2010 Census); 3,297 (2002 Census).
