= Arbuzovo =

Arbuzovo Арбузово
- Selo
- Location within Vladimir Oblast Location within Russia
- Coordinates: 56°00′N 40°09′E
- Country: Russia
- Region: Vladimir Oblast
- District: Sobinsky District
- Time zone: UTC+3:00

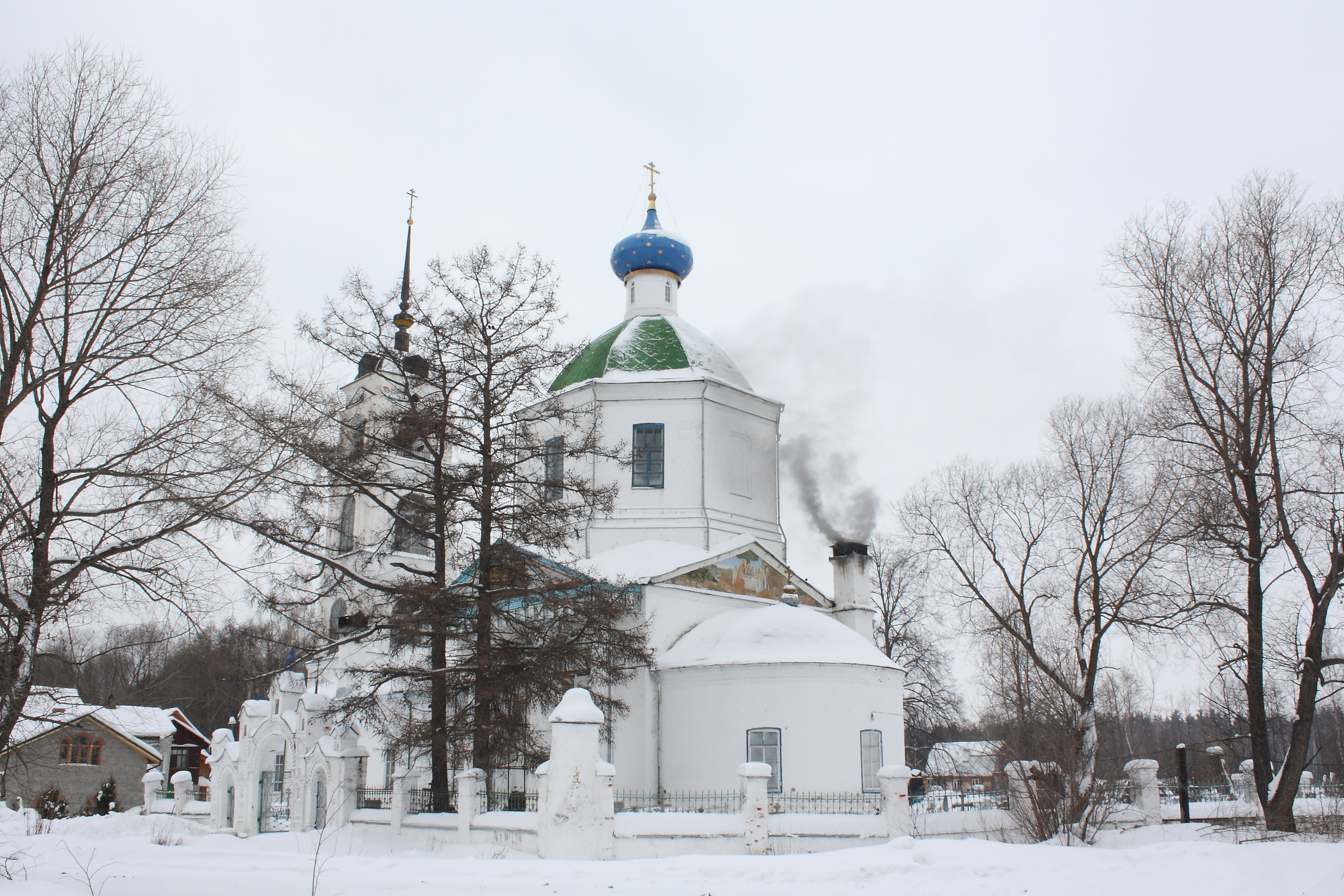
Holy Trinity Church in Arbuzovo

Arbuzovo (Russian: Арбузово) is a rural locality (a selo) in Aserkhovskoye Rural Settlement, Sobinsky District, Vladimir Oblast, Russia. The population was 146 as of 2010.

== Geography ==
Arbuzovo is located 9 km east of Sobinka (the district's administrative centre) by road. Pushnino is the nearest rural locality.
