= 2nd Shock Army =

- Active: 1941–1946
- Country: Soviet Union
- Branch: Regular Army
- Type: Shock troops
- Size: Varied throughout the years
- Part of: Military District
- Engagements: World War II; Siege of Leningrad; Battle of Narva; Vistula–Oder offensive

Commanders
- Notable commanders: Andrei Vlasov; Ivan Fedyuninsky

The 2nd Shock Army (Russian: 2-я Ударная армия), sometimes translated to English as 2nd Assault Army, was a field army of the Soviet Union during the Second World War. This type of formation was created in accordance with prewar doctrine that called for Shock Armies to overcome difficult defensive dispositions in order to create a tactical penetration of sufficient breadth and depth to permit the commitment of mobile formations for deeper exploitation. However, as the war went on, Shock Armies lost this specific role and reverted, in general, to ordinary frontline formations.

== World War II ==
The 2nd Shock Army was formed from the Volkhov Front's 26th Army in December 1941 and initially consisted of the 327th Rifle Division and eight separate rifle brigades. In January 1942 the Volkhov Front commander, Meretskov, had to request that the Army’s commander, General Lieutenant Sokolov, a former NKVD commissar, be relieved, as he was absolutely incompetent. Command was handed over to the former commander of 52nd Army, General Lieutenant Klykov. Later that same month the 2nd Shock Army was launched against Lyuban, but its offensive saw the Army isolated, under a new commander, General Lieutenant A. A. Vlasov.

On 7 January 1942, Vlasov's army had spearheaded the Lyuban offensive operation to break the Leningrad encirclement. Planned as a combined operation between the Volkhov and Leningrad Fronts on a 30 km (19 mi) frontage, other armies of the Leningrad Front (including the 54th) were supposed to participate at scheduled intervals in this operation. Crossing the Volkhov River, Vlasov's army was successful in breaking through the German 18th Army's lines and penetrated 70–74 km deep inside the German rear area. The other armies (Volkhov Front's 4th, 52nd, and 59th Armies, 13th Cavalry Corps, and 4th and 6th Guards Rifle Corps), however, failed to provide the required support, and Vlasov's army became stranded. Permission to retreat was refused. With the counter-offensive in May 1942, the Second Shock Army was finally allowed to retreat, but by now, too weakened, it was virtually annihilated during the final breakout at Myasnoi Bor. Vlasov was taken prisoner by the Wehrmacht troops on 6 July 1942. He later raised a legion of Russians who fought alongside the German forces.

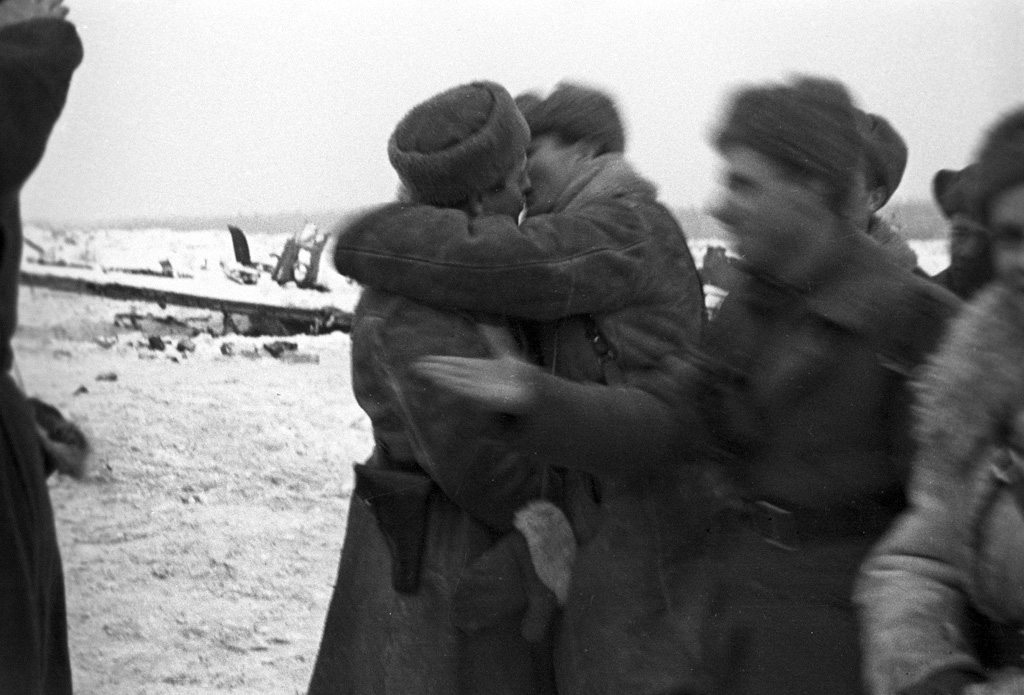
Meeting of the 2nd Shock Army and the 67th Army in January 1943 during Operation Iskra

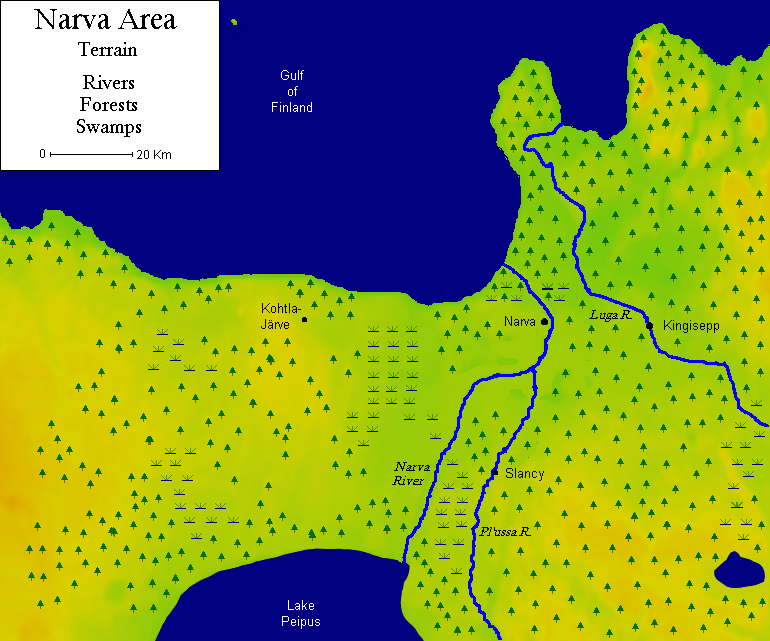
The terrain in which the 2nd Shock Army fought in the 1944 Battle of Narva.

2nd Shock Army again suffered severe losses during the Sinyavino operation from 19 August – 20 October 1942. Again, the remnants were returned to the Front reserves for rebuilding.

In January 1943 it took part in the offensive which aimed to raise the siege of Leningrad, Operation Iskra. The Stavka then intervened in Leningrad Front offensive planning during September 1943, changing the plan so that 2nd Shock Army would attack from the Oranienbaum bridgehead. The offensive, under a newly appointed commander, General I.I. Fedyuninskii, begun on 14 January, took part in breaking the almost 900-day siege of Leningrad, and pushed west to the outskirts of Narva, resulting in the Battle of Narva. During its participation in the Battle of Narva, the 2nd Shock Army consisted of five rifle divisions (11th, 43rd Rifle Division, 90th Rifle Division, 131st, and 196th) along with 600 artillery pieces, a tank brigade, another tank regiment, two SPG regiments, and masses of ammunition and supplies.

The 2nd Shock Army struggled to take Narva and German positions further west of the city until September 1944, when deep exploitation by Soviet forces in the Baltic States forced a German retreat through Estonia. As a result of the strategic Soviet victory in this region, the 2nd Shock Army was moved south and assigned to the 2nd Belorussian Front. As part of the 2nd Belorussian Front, the 2nd Shock Army fought across Poland and northeastern Germany, with its route of march taking it north of Warsaw and Stettin. In late March, the army helped capture Danzig. On 1 May 1945, the 2nd Shock Army took Stralsund on the Baltic Coast, ending the war there and on the island of Rügen.

== Postwar ==
After the end of the war, the 2nd Shock Army remained in eastern Germany. In June the army was headquartered in Goldberg, East Germany, and in August moved to Schwerin. The 2nd Shock Army returned to the Soviet Union in January 1946, and its headquarters was reorganized as the Arkhangelsk Military District. It was composed of three rifle corps by this time (9 divisions). After the 2nd Shock Army was re-designated HQ Arkhangelsk MD's 116th Rifle Corps, its component units were spread among other districts. The 109th Rifle Corps (101st Guards, 46th and 372nd rifle divisions) went to the North Caucasus Military District, and the 134th Rifle Corps (102nd Guards, 90th and 272nd rifle divisions) went to the Voronezh Region.

== Commanders ==
- Lieutenant-General Grigory Grigorievich Sokolov (24 December 1941 - 10 January 1942)
- Lieutenant-General Nikolai Klykov (10 January 1942 to 16 April 1942)
- Lieutenant-General Andrey Vlasov (16 April 1942 - 1 July 1942), later commander of the pro-Nazi Russian Liberation Army
- Lieutenant-General Nikolai Klykov (24 July 1942 to 12 December 1942)
- Lieutenant-General Vladimir Zakharovich Romanovsky (12 December 1942 to 23 December 1943)
- Lieutenant-General Ivan Fedyuninsky (from 23 December 1943 to April 1946), commander during the Battle of Narva, from October 1944, Colonel-General.

== Sources and references ==
- Keith E. Bonn, Slaughterhouse: The Handbook of the Eastern Front, Aberjona Press, Bedford, PA, 2005
- Feskov, The Soviet Army in the Period of the Cold War, Tomsk, 2004
