= Lyuban, Russia =

Lyuban (Russian: Любань) is the name of several urban and rural inhabited localities (towns, logging depot settlements, and villages) in Russia.

Urban localities

- Lyuban (town), Leningrad Oblast, a town in Lyubanskoye Settlement Municipal Formation of Tosnensky District, Leningrad Oblast

Rural localities

- Lyuban (rural locality), Leningrad Oblast, a logging depot settlement in Lyubanskoye Settlement Municipal Formation of Tosnensky District, Leningrad Oblast
- Lyuban, Novgorod Oblast, a village under the administrative jurisdiction of the urban-type settlement of Nebolchi in Lyubytinsky District, Novgorod Oblast
