= Battle of Lyuban =

Military operation

- Part of the Eastern Front of World War II
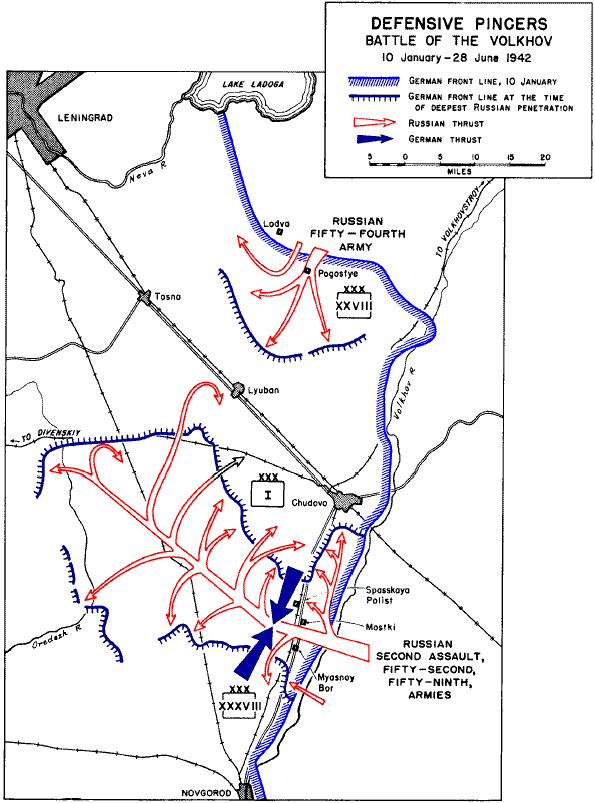
- Battle of the Volkhov, 10 January – 28 June 1942
Date	7 January 1942 – 30 April 1942 (3 months, 3 weeks and 2 days)
Location	Southern shore of Lake Ladoga, near Lyuban
Result	German victory

Belligerents
Germany	Soviet Union

Commanders and leaders
(Nazi Germany) Georg von Küchler	(Soviet Union) Kirill Meretskov (Soviet Union) Mikhail Khozin (Soviet Union) Andrey Vlasov (POW) (Soviet Union) Leonid Govorov

Units involved
Army Group North: 18th Army	Volkhov Front: 2nd Shock Army; 4th Army; 52nd Army; 59th Army; Leningrad Front: 8th Army; 54th Army

Strength
Approximately 200,000 men	7 January: Volkhov Front: 327,700 men

Casualties and losses
56,768 men 11,642 killed 43,869 wounded 1,257 missing	308,367 men 95,064 killed or captured 213,303 wounded or sick

The Battle of Lyuban, Lyuban offensive operation or Battle of the Volkhov (7 January 1942 – 30 April 1942) (Russian: Любанская наступательная операция; German: Schlacht am Wolchow) was a Soviet offensive operation of World War II. It was conducted by the Volkhov and Leningrad Fronts of the Red Army with the goal of relieving the siege of Leningrad and encircling and destroying the German forces carrying out the siege.

The offensive used no tanks because of the terrain, therefore it was down to the infantry and the artillery. The attacking Soviet forces found themselves under intense fire from German defensive positions, and the Red Army lacked proper artillery support against the German lines. The offensive stalled and the Soviets went over to the defensive. Field Marshal Georg von Küchler counterattacked with an operation called 'Wild Beast" (Operation Raubtier) and the Soviet 2nd Shock Army was cut off and surrounded. It was destroyed in June 1942 and its commander Andrey Vlasov was taken prisoner. Vlasov later became a leading member of the collaborationist Committee for the Liberation of the Peoples of Russia and Russian Liberation Army.

== Aftermath ==
=== Analysis ===
The Volkhov and Leningrad Fronts lacked the armored vehicles, artillery ammunition, manpower reserves, fuel and food to mount sustained offensive operations against the German 18th Army. Inadequate Soviet firepower could not reduce the German system of fortified strongpoints in the forests. The Germans inflicted heavy losses on the attacking Soviet forces and forced the exhausted Red Army to the defensive. According to general Mikhail Khozin, Soviet armored forces and artillery firepower did not exist in sufficient quantities to exploit penetrations and defeat German counterattacks.

=== Casualties ===
Out of 327,700 men deployed into battle from 7 January – 30 April 1942, the Volkhov Front lost 308,367, including 95,064 killed or missing and 213,303 wounded or sick.

== Bibliography ==
- Forczyk, Robert (2009). Leningrad 1941–44: the epic siege. Oxford: Osprey. ISBN 978-1-84603-441-1.
- Glantz, David M. (2000). "Forgotten Battles of the German-Soviet War (1941-45), Part 5: The Winter Campaign (5 December 1941-April 1942): The Leningrad Counteroffensive". Journal of Slavic Military Studies. 13 (4): 127–192. doi:10.1080/13518040008430463. S2CID 219624530.
- Krivosheev, Grigoriy (1997). Soviet Casualties and Combat Losses in the Twentieth Century. London: Greenhill Books. ISBN 1-85367-280-7.
