= Volkhov Front =

Volkhov Front (1st formation)
- Active: 17 December 1941 – 23 April 1942
- Country: Soviet Union
- Branch: Red Army
- Type: Front
- Role: Shock army group
- Size: Six combined arms armies, one air army, three corps
- Engagements: Relief of the Siege of Leningrad; 1941 Summer-Autumn Campaign; 1941–1942 Winter Campaign

Commanders
- Notable commanders: Marshal of the Soviet Union Kirill Meretskov

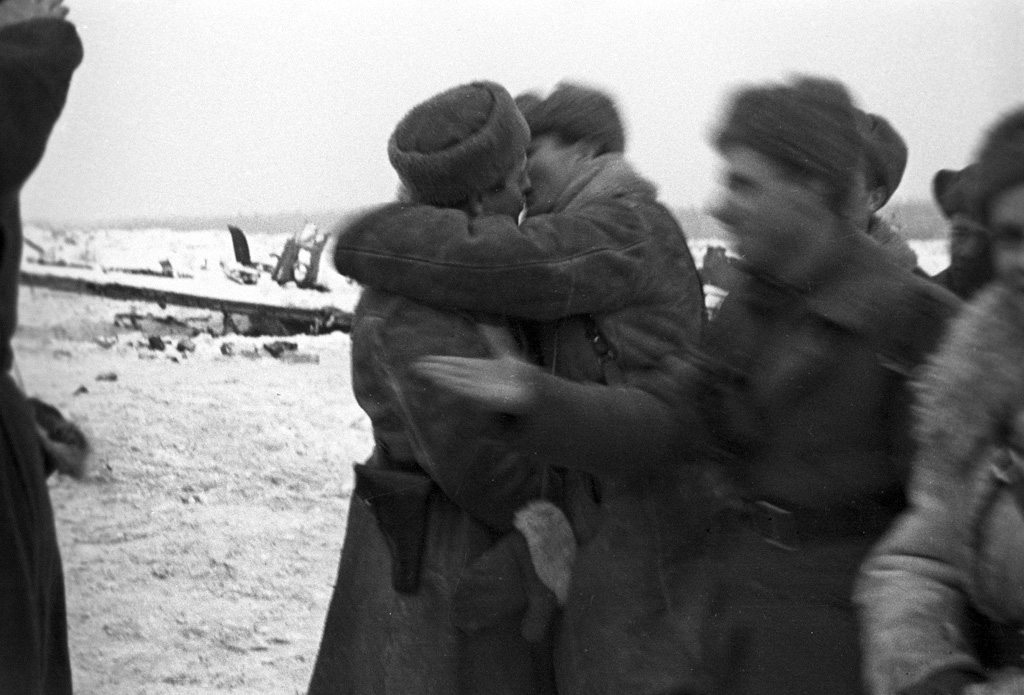
Joining of Leningrad and Volkhov Fronts”. The Great Patriotic War. Troops of Leningrad and Volkhov Fronts united

The Volkhov Front (Russian: Волховский фронт) was a major formation of the Red Army during the first period of the Second World War. It was formed as an expediency of an early attempt to halt the advance of the Wehrmacht Army Group North in its offensive thrust towards Leningrad. Initially the front operated to the south of Leningrad, with its flank on Lake Ladoga.

== First formation ==
The Volkhov Front was formed on 17 December 1941 from the left wing of the Leningrad Front and elements of the Reserve of the Supreme High Command (Stavka Reserve) during the conduct of the Tikhvin Offensive operation under the command of the Army General Kirill Meretskov, with General Grigory Stelmakh (former commander of the 4th Army) as Chief of Staff and Army Commissar of 1st rank A.I.Zaporozhets.

Initially Sokolov's 26th Army (later 2nd Shock Army) and Galanin's 59th Armies were allocated to the Front's formation. The Front also included Meretskov's 4th Army and Klykov's 52nd Army. The Front's air support was provided by the 14th Air Army (Russian: 14-я воздушная армия) of General-Major I.P. Zhuravlev. The 8th Army that was formed in early January was also added to the Front. Initially the Front held a frontage of 250 km. The Front's neighbouring formations were the 54th Army of the Leningrad Front (later incorporated into the Volkhov Front) and the 11th Army of the North-Western Front.

Volkhov Front's goal was to move westward, pushing towards the Leningrad Front. In order to do this, it had to deceive the German army in several respects. This was carried out, for instance, by attacking the enemy in a swampy region, the least trafficable area where the German weakness compensated for the difficulty in movement. This constituted a deception because the Soviets have been focusing their attacks on a very narrow attack sector (16 kilometers). Secondly, Meretskov also directed a series of false and diversionary maneuvers. There was the case of tactical strategy that made the Germans believe the troops were amassing in the Malaya Vishera, which is located east of the Volkhov region. This gave the impression that the Volkhov Front's target was Novgorod while the attack took place elsewhere. Meretskov's front's aimed to inflict the main blow south to Chudovo while the 8th army's main target was north of Mga.

=== 2nd Shock Army and Vlasov ===
Andrey Vlasov was named Deputy Commander under Meretskov and in charge of the 2nd Shock Army (Russian: 2-ая Ударная Армия). On January 7, 1942, he spearheaded the Lyuban Offensive Operation to break the Leningrad encirclement. Planned as a combined operation between the Volkhov and Leningrad Fronts on a 30km frontage, other armies of the Leningrad Front (including the 54th) were supposed to participate at scheduled intervals in this operation. Crossing the Volkhov River Vlasov's army was successful in breaking through the German Eighteenth Army lines and penetrated 70–74km deep inside the German rear area. The other armies (Volkhov Front's 4th, 52nd, and 59th Armies, 13th Cavalry Corps, and 4th and 6th Guards Rifle Corps), however, failed to provide the required support, and Vlasov's army became stranded. Permission to retreat was refused. With the counter-offensive in May 1942, the Second Shock Army was finally allowed to retreat, but by now, too weakened, it was annihilated. Vlasov was taken prisoner by the Wehrmacht troops on July 6, 1942.

=== Volkhov Operational Group ===
The Front was disbanded and its elements reorganised as the Volkhov Operational Group and incorporated into the Leningrad Front on 23 April 1942.

==== Strategic operations ====
- Tikhvin strategic offensive operation of 1941 (Russian: Тихвинская стратегическая наступательная операция 1941 года)

==== Front and Army operations ====
- Tikhvinsk-Kirishsk offensive operation of 1941 (Russian: Тихвинско-Киришская наступательная операция 1941 года)
- Malo-Vishersk offensive operation of 1941 (Russian: Мало-Вишерская наступательная операция 1941 года)
- Lyubansk offensive operation of 1942 (Russian: Любанская наступательная операция 1942 года).

== Second formation ==
Volkhov Front (2nd formation)
- Active: 9 June 1942 – 15 February 1944
- Country: Soviet Union
- Branch: Combined arms
- Type: Front
- Role: Offensive
- Size: six Combined arms armies, one air army, three corps
- Engagements: Relief of the Siege of Leningrad; Winter campaign (1942–43); Summer-autumn campaign (1943)

Commanders
- Notable commanders: Marshal of the Soviet Union K. A. Meretskov

The Front was reformed on the 9 June 1942 from the Volkhov Operational Group of the Leningrad Front and served until 15 February 1944, participating in the relief of the Siege of Leningrad and taking part in other operations including:

=== Campaigns ===
- Winter Campaign on 1942–43
- Summer Autumn Campaign of 1943
- Winter-Spring Campaign of 1944

==== The strategic operations ====
- Leningrad-Novgorod strategic offensive operation of 1944 (Russian: Ленинградско-Новгородская стратегическая наступательная операция 1944 года)
- Relief of the Leningrad blockade through Operation Spark in 1943 (Russian: Наступательная операция «Искра» 1943 года)

==== Front and army operations ====
- Operation for the conclusion of extricating of the 2nd Shock Army of 1942 (Russian: Операция по выводу из окружения 2-й ударной армии 1942 года)
- 1942 Sinyavin offensive (Russian: Синявинская наступательная операция 1942 года)
- Minsk offensive operation of 1943 (Russian: Минская наступательная операция 1943 года)
- Novgorod-Luzhsk offensive operation of 1944 (Russian: Новгородско-Лужская наступательная операция 1944 года)

== Sources ==
- Meretskov, K.A., On the service of the nation. Moscow, Politizdat, 1968 (Russian: Мерецков К.А. На службе народу. — М.: Политиздат, 1968.)
- Bonn/Glantz, Slaughterhouse: Handbook of the Eastern Front, Aberjona Press, Bedford, PA, 2005
- John Erickson, The Road to Stalingrad, 1975, p. 278, 332
- Lubbeck, William and David B. Hurt. At Leningrad's Gates: The Story of a Soldier with Army Group North, Philadelphia, PA: Casemate, 2006 (ISBN 1-932033-55-6).
