= 382nd Rifle Division =

- Active: 1941 - 1946
- Country: Soviet Union
- Branch: Red Army
- Type: Division
- Role: Infantry
- Engagements: Battle of Leningrad; Lyuban Offensive Operation; Fifth Sinyavino Offensive; Leningrad-Novgorod Offensive; Vyborg–Petrozavodsk Offensive; Baltic Offensive; Courland Pocket
- Battle honours: Novgorod

Commanders
- Notable commanders: Col. Georgii Petrovich Sokurov; Col. Kuzma Evgenevich Kartsev; Col. Aleksei Dmitrievich Vitoshkin; Maj. Gen. Pyotr Nikolaevich Chernyshev; Col. Anton Afanasevich Zolotarev

The 382nd Rifle Division was raised in 1941 as an infantry division of the Red Army, and served for the duration of the Great Patriotic War in that role. It began forming on August 10 in the Siberian Military District. It joined the fighting front in December with the new 59th Army along the Volkhov River. Apart from a few weeks in 1944, the division served in either the Volkhov Front or the Leningrad Front for the entire war.

It suffered horrendous casualties after being encircled in the swamps and forests near Lyuban and was severely understrength for many months afterwards while serving on a relatively quiet front. It remained in the line in the dismal fighting near Leningrad until early 1944 with little opportunity to distinguish itself, and the division did not finally earn a battle honor until late January 1944, during the Leningrad–Novgorod Offensive.

Following this, the division was moved to the Karelian Isthmus and entered the summer offensive against Finland in the reserves of Leningrad Front before being assigned to the 23rd Army. Following the Finnish surrender it was redeployed westward, helping to mop up pockets of enemy forces in the Baltic states in early 1945. The 382nd ended the war in Latvia, helping to contain and reduce the German forces trapped in the Courland Pocket, and was officially disbanded in February, 1946.

== Formation ==
The 382nd began forming on August 10, 1941 at Kansk in the Siberian Military District, based on an RKO order of that date that included the 372nd, 374th, 376th, 378th and 380th Rifle Divisions. Its order of battle, based on the first wartime shtat (table of organization and equipment) for rifle divisions, was as follows:

- 1265th Rifle Regiment
- 1267th Rifle Regiment
- 1269th Rifle Regiment
- 946th Artillery Regiment
- 319th Antitank Battalion
- 383rd Antiaircraft Battery; 670th Antiaircraft Battalion (until May 23, 1943)
- 425th Mortar Battalion (until September 1, 1942)
- 445th Reconnaissance Company
- 663rd Sapper Battalion
- 834th Signal Battalion (later 564th Signal Company)
- 468th Medical/Sanitation Battalion
- 461st Chemical Protection (Anti-gas) Company
- 498th Motor Transport Company
- 237th Field Bakery
- 806th Divisional Veterinary Hospital
- 1431st Field Postal Station
- 754th (573rd) Field Office of the State Bank

Col. Georgii Petrovich Sokurov, an NKVD officer, was assigned to command of the division on September 1, and he would remain in command until March 21, 1942. In November the division was assigned to the 59th Reserve Army, and remained in there when it became the 59th Army. It moved by rail that month as far as Vologda from where it faced a march of about 700 km to reach the fighting front. The 382nd and its Army joined Volkhov Front in December and the division saw its first action in January, 1942. At this time it had over 10,000 personnel on strength.

=== Lyuban Offensive Operation ===
On January 6, 1942, the Front began an offensive to break through the positions of German 18th Army on the west bank of the Volkhov, primarily with the 2nd Shock Army, and break the siege of Leningrad from the south. The operation got off to a slow start, and it was not until the night of January 23/24 that the Front commander, Army Gen. K. A. Meretskov, could convince himself that 2nd Shock had created enough of a breach to commit his exploitation force. However, the situation soon reverted to stalemate, which Meretskov hoped to break on January 28 in part by clearing the enemy from the western bank of the Volkhov to the Polist River line. For this phase of the operation the 382nd was divided: one rifle regiment was subordinated to Operational Group Korovnikov "to complete liquidating the enemy strong points in the Spasskaia Polist and Liubino Pole sector"; the remainder was placed under Operational Group Privalov with orders to advance to the Kerest River line by day's end on the 28th, thus moving into the northernmost reaches of the salient, about 12 km south of Lyuban.

In the next few days the 382nd was subordinated to 2nd Shock Army. Colonel Sokurov was replaced in command of the division on March 22 by Col. Kuzma Evgenevich Kartsev. As the Army struggled to advance in the frozen swamps and peat bogs of the area, with utterly inadequate supplies, 18th Army prepared its counterstrike. By March 26 German forces had completed inner and outer encirclement lines along the Glushitsa and Polist Rivers and 2nd Shock, along with several formations of 59th Army, were trapped. Early the next day Meretskov launched a desperate new assault which managed to carve out a tenuous gap 3 – 5 km wide near the village of Miasnoi Bor. This was by no means adequate, and over the next two months the Army's men continued to slowly bleed and starve despite the arrival of a new commander, Lt. Gen. A. A. Vlasov. As of June 1 the division had just 507 officers, 454 NCOs, and 1,473 men on strength, and managed to escape being disbanded due to the rifle regiment left outside the pocket, although it also suffered losses in the attempts to break in. On July 10 Colonel Kartsev gave over his command to Col. Aleksei Dmitrievich Vitoshkin. From this time until March, 1943, the 382nd was back in 59th Army. This relatively quiet front did not have priority for replacements; as an example, by April the 319th Antitank Battalion had just two 45mm guns and 30 antitank rifles, given that there was little scope for enemy tanks due to the terrain.

== Mga and Novgorod Offensives ==
In March the 382nd was reassigned to 8th Army, still in Volkhov Front. On June 11 Colonel Vitoshkin was assigned to the Military Academy of the General Staff for training, and eight days later the division came under the command of Maj. Gen. Pyotr Nikolaevich Chernyshev. By July it was judged sufficiently restored that it was assigned a minor role in the fifth Sinyavino Offensive. This began on July 22 with 8th Army attacking east of Mga, on an attack front of 13.6 km in the Voronovo region and aiming to link up with 67th Army at or near Mga while detaching two rifle divisions and a tank brigade to strike at Sinyavino from the south. In order to penetrate the strong German defenses the Army commander, Lt. Gen. F. N. Starikov, organized his main forces into two shock groups. The 382nd, along with the 265th Rifle Division and the 1st and 22nd Rifle Brigades, was to put in a supporting attack on the left. The offensive was preceded by six days of artillery fire on the enemy positions, which were held by the 132nd Infantry Division. Despite the careful preparations the attack stalled after capturing the forward German trenches. Starikov made several efforts to renew the drive but was forced to call a halt on August 16, and his Army went over to the defense on August 22. By this time one soldier of the 132nd Infantry wrote that his division was "reduced by casualties and exhausted to the point of incoherence", but losses on the Soviet side were also heavy.

=== Battle for Novgorod ===
During September and most of October the 382nd was in the reserves of Volkhov Front, then was assigned to the 7th Rifle Corps in 54th Army of the same Front. At the start of 1944 it was still in 7th Corps, but back in the Front reserves. In the plan for the Leningrad-Novgorod Offensive, 59th Army was assigned the main role in the liberation of the latter city. On January 14, after pulverizing the German defenses by firing 133,000 artillery shells during its preparation, the Army's leading corps deployed assault detachments at 1050 hours. 6th Rifle Corps stalled after advancing only 1,000 metres, but a premature attack by 14th Rifle Corps' 378th Rifle Division scored a surprise success. By late on January 16 these two corps, with reinforcements, had torn a gaping 20 km hole in the Germans' main defensive belt. At about this time 7th Corps was subordinated to 59th Army. Over the next two days it continued a slow but inexorable advance, enveloping the German Novgorod grouping from north and south. On January 18 the XXXVIII Army Corps was ordered to abandon the city and withdraw along the only remaining road to the west. At 0930 hours on January 20 the 382nd, along with the 191st and 225th Rifle Divisions of 14th Corps, liberated Novgorod without a fight after the last Germans out destroyed the bridge over the Volkhov. In recognition of this success, the division received a battle honor:

"NOVGOROD"... 382nd Rifle Division (Maj. Gen. Chernyshev, Pyotr Nikolaevich)... The troops who participated in the battles with the enemy, and the breakthrough and liberation of Novgorod, by the order of the Supreme High Command of January 20, 1944, and a commendation in Moscow, are given a salute of 20 artillery salvoes from 224 guns.

Following this victory the next objective for 59th Army was the town of Luga. Seizing this would cut off both the XXXVIII and XXVIII Army Corps but it would require an advance through difficult terrain with significant engineer support. The 6th, 7th and 112th Rifle Corps set out on January 21. Two days later the 382nd was involved in heavy fighting for the village of Zhmurova. Jr. Sgt. Timofei Titovich Makarenko was a gun layer on an antitank gun of the 319th Battalion. Despite the deaths of the other members of his crew and his own severe wounds he held his position until reinforcements arrived. On August 26 he was recognized with the award of the Gold Star of a Hero of the Soviet Union (Medal No. 4423), although he later had it revoked, then restored.

Over the following days while the 6th and 112th Corps advanced at a snail's pace, 7th and 14th Corps made significantly greater progress on the Army's left flank. On January 27 the 382nd captured Medved from the 8th Jäger Division and cut the road from Luga to Shimsk. By this time 7th Corps had penetrated the Germans' entire second defensive belt, had advanced up to 35 km to the west and southwest in five days and threatened to cut the Leningrad - Dno railroad. A regrouping soon assigned 7th Corps to 8th Army, and by the beginning of February the division was part of 14th Rifle Corps. Volkhov Front was disbanded on February 15, and the 382nd went into the Leningrad Front reserves. It was briefly transferred to 3rd Baltic Front in April before moving back to Leningrad Front in preparation for the offensive against Finland.

== Vyborg-Petrozavodsk Offensive ==
On June 1 the 382nd was transferred to the reserves of Leningrad Front as a separate rifle division. On June 7 General Chernyshev handed command of the division over to Col. Pyotr Filimonovich Efimenko, who would remain in the post for only three weeks; Chernyshev would later command the 17th Guards Rifle Division. The offensive against Finland began on June 10, following a massive artillery preparation. The division did not see action in the early going, but was committed on June 18 as part of 6th Rifle Corps to reinforce the right flank of 23rd Army in breaking through the Finnish third defensive belt, the VKT-line. The 382nd would remain in this Corps until the last weeks of the war. On the 19th the division captured the strongpoint at Muolaa from the Finnish 3rd Infantry Division. On June 21 elements of 21st Army occupied the abandoned city of Vyborg while 6th and 98th Rifle Corps pursued Finnish forces northwestward.

A new phase of the offensive began on June 22. 6th Corps was deployed from south of Repola to Kiuliapakkola on the west bank of the Vuoksi River, still facing the 3rd Infantry. The Finnish division showed its mettle and the Corps' assault faltered almost immediately. On June 27 Colonel Efimenko was replaced in command by Lt. Col. Anton Afanasevich Zolotarev; he would be promoted to full colonel on November 3 and would remain in command for the duration. Repeated assaults in early July, especially from the 4th to the 11th, failed to make more than minor progress. 23rd Army was ordered to go over to the defense on July 11.

=== Into the Baltic States ===
The division remained in 23rd Army until December. In January, 1945 it was reassigned, with 6th Corps, back to 8th Army, and spent most of the rest of the war clearing the Baltic coast and the Baltic islands of isolated pockets of German troops. In March, 8th Army was assigned to the Courland Group of Forces of Leningrad Front, maintaining the siege of the former German Army Group North in Latvia, and in April the division was reassigned to the 111th Rifle Corps of 67th Army, still in the Courland Group. When the shooting stopped it was officially known as the 382nd Rifle, Novgorod Division (Russian: 382-я стрелковая Новгородская дивизия). It was disbanded on February 8, 1946.
