= 225th Rifle Division =

- Active: 1941–1945
- Country: Soviet Union
- Branch: Red Army
- Type: Infantry
- Size: Division
- Engagements: Siege of Leningrad; Battle of Lyuban; Operation Polar Star; Leningrad-Novgorod offensive Novgorod–Luga offensive Pskov-Ostrov offensive Baltic offensive Riga offensive (1944); Vistula–Oder offensive Lower Silesian offensive Upper Silesian offensive Prague offensive
- Decorations: Order of the Red Banner; Order of Kutuzov
- Battle honours: Novgorod

Commanders
- Notable commanders: Col. Konstantin Uvenalevich Andreev; Col. Pyotr Ivanovich Olkhovskii; Col. Mikhail Aleksandrovich Pesochin

The 225th Rifle Division was an infantry division of the Red Army, formed in December 1941 from the remnants of the pre-war 3rd Tank Division and based on the shtat (table of organization and equipment) of July 29, 1941. The 3rd Tank's single rifle regiment was joined by two reserve rifle regiments, and its howitzer regiment was converted to a standard artillery regiment. As part of 52nd Army in Volkhov Front it took part in largely local fighting in the Novgorod area, seeing combat in several abortive attempts to retake the city until it finally played a main role in its liberation in January 1944 and received its name as a battle honor.

Following this victory, the 225th advanced toward Pskov, now as part of 54th Army. When the summer offensive began, it helped breach the German defenses of the Panther Line in the Pskov area and then advanced through Latvia, eventually reaching Riga. When 3rd Baltic Front was disbanded, the division was reassigned to the 21st Army, which was soon moved to 1st Ukrainian Front. From late January 1945 into late March it saw extensive action in Silesia and in the process was awarded the Order of Kutuzov. It was not directly involved in the Berlin campaign, but joined its Front for the final advance into Czechoslovakia. As with many other distinguished rifle divisions, it was disbanded in June 1945.

== Formation ==
A division numbered as the 225th began forming in March 1941 in the Odessa Military District but in April it was moved to the Kharkov Military District and disbanded to provide a cadre for the 2nd Airborne Brigade.

The 3rd Tank Division was formed in July 1940 in the Leningrad Military District as part of the 1st Mechanized Corps. It was based in part on the 13th Light Tank Brigade and inherited the Order of the Red Banner the Brigade had been awarded on April 11; this decoration would later be inherited by the 225th. At the start of the German invasion in June 1941 the division was at nearly full-strength but all of its roughly 350 tanks were outdated BT types. It first saw action against the 4th Panzer Group in July and after the 1st Mechanized Corps HQ was shut down in August it was assigned to the Novgorod Operational Group. The swampy forests north of Lake Ilmen was no place for tanks, but by then all but a handful had been lost and the division's remnants were essentially fighting as an infantry formation.

The division officially converted to a rifle unit on December 14, 1941, near Novgorod, which had fallen to Army Group North on August 19. When completed it had the following order of battle, although it would be modified, temporarily or permanently, on several occasions:

- 299th Rifle Regiment (from 3rd Motorized Rifle Regiment)
- 1347th Rifle Regiment
- 1349th Rifle Regiment (later 1379th Rifle Regiment)
- 1009th Artillery Regiment (from 3rd Motorized Howitzer Regiment)
- 6th Antitank Battalion
- 115th Reconnaissance Company
- 697th Sapper Battalion
- 901st Signal Battalion (later 897th Signal Battalion and 817th Signal Company)
- 504th Medical/Sanitation Battalion
- 16th Chemical Defense (Anti-gas) Company (later 484th)
- 550th Motor Transport Company
- 402nd Field Bakery
- 179th Divisional Veterinary Hospital (later 897th and 879th)
- 99th Field Postal Station
- 205th Field Office of the State Bank (later 1046th)

Col. Konstantin Uvenalevich Andreev was appointed to command on December 14. This officer had commanded 3rd Tanks from March 11, 1941, until August 12 when he was placed at the disposal of the Main Directorate of Personnel of the People's Commissariat of Defense. The division was immediately assigned to the 52nd Army in Volkhov Front.

=== Battle of Lyuban ===
The Volkhov and Leningrad Fronts began an operation to relieve the besieged city of Leningrad on January 7, 1942, primarily with the 2nd Shock Army attacking across the Volkhov River in the direction of Lyuban. On January 17 the Army resumed its attack, supported by more than 1,500 aircraft sorties, and after penetrating the Germans' first defensive positions on the west bank of the Volkhov advanced 5–10 kilometers (3.1–6.2 miles) into their rear areas. On March 15 the German 18th Army began its Operation Raubtier with the objective of pinching out the 10km-wide corridor connecting 2nd Shock Army to the Soviet front along the Volkhov to encircle it and thwart its planned attack on Lyuban.

Army Gen. K. A. Meretskov, the commander of Volkhov Front, frantically formulated plans to thwart this threat and in communications with the STAVKA on March 21 proposed committing 52nd Army to an effort in the direction of Novgorod:

During the final stage of the offensive, the immediate attack on Novgorod will begin on 6–7 April. When the front's main forces reach the Bolotnaia Platform and Nekokhovo front, it will be necessary to conduct an air assault operation with one airborne brigade to cut approach routes into Novgorod from Bashkovo and Borka. Simultaneously, the 225th Rifle Division will allocate one reinforced regiment and conduct an attack from Slutka to the Volkhov River's western bank to sever the Leningrad highway. As the operation develops, the 366th Rifle Division will protect it from the west, and the 225th Rifle Division will do so from the east and the north.

This plan was approved within hours but despite Meretskov's best efforts the 2nd Shock Army was thoroughly cut off by March 26. At this point the immediate needs of the trapped force (which included elements of 59th Army as well) had to take priority over a diversionary effort on Novgorod. A shock group was formed inside the pocket to clear a corridor in cooperation with 52nd Army attacking from the outside in the Miasnoi Bor–Novaya Kerest area.

The attack on March 27 managed to push through a corridor near Miasnoi Bor by day's end, but this was only 3–5 km (1.9–3.1 mi) in width and under German fire during daylight. On March 30 Meretskov filed a report which overplayed this success while laying down revised plans for the Novgorod thrust. Pending the arrival of the 2nd and 170th Rifle Divisions he proposed to conduct local operations to eliminate salients in the Tiutitsy, Liubtsy, Zemtitsy and Veshky region with the 376th and 65th Rifle Divisions, plus elements of the 225th and 305th Rifle Divisions, beginning on April 2. This proposal was sidelined by the need to improve communications with 2nd Shock, which was completed by April 8 and 52nd Army dug in to protect the widened corridor. At this point the spring rasputitsa set in and the corridor became effectively impassable. In an effort to improve command and control, on April 23 the Leningrad and Volkhov Fronts were merged and 52nd Army joined the Group of Forces on the Volkhov Axis.

The fighting to save 2nd Shock Army continued into July, but this did not directly involve the 225th as it fought for positions along the Volkhov, primarily against the 250th Infantry Division (Spanish División Azul). In May the 52nd Army, which now had only the 225th, 65th and 305th Divisions under command, came under the Volkhov Group of Forces, but this reverted to Volkhov Front a month later. On May 28 Colonel Andreev was moved to Army headquarters where he eventually became commander of the 52nd's tank and mechanized forces. He was replaced by Col. Vasilii Yakovlevich Nikolaevskii, but this officer was in turn replaced on June 21 by Col. Pyotr Ivanovich Olkhovskii, who had been serving as the division's chief of artillery. The division would remain on the defensive along the Volkhov as part of 52nd Army into March 1943.

== Battles for Novgorod ==
In the wake of the success of Operation Iskra, which restored land communications to Leningrad, Marshal G. K. Zhukov began planning an expanded offensive to be called Operation Polar Star. While this succeeded in finally seizing the long-contested Demyansk Salient, which Army Group North was in the process of evacuating, the freed-up German forces became available to reinforce thinly held lines elsewhere, including near Novgorod. Volkhov Front was intended to enter the offensive on March 14, with 52nd Army conducting a limited-objective offensive against Novgorod, both to assist Northwestern Front's assault on Staraya Russa and to draw some of 18th Army's forces away from Leningrad.

52nd Army now consisted of the 225th, 65th, 229th and 310th Rifle Divisions, with the 38th Ski Brigade, 34th and 53rd Aerosan Battalions, and the 150th Fortified Region. The Army's assault across the Volkhov south of Novgorod struck the defenses of XXXVIII Army Corps' 1st Luftwaffe Field Division but made only limited gains in fighting that continued until March 27. However, it did succeed in drawing two German divisions from other threatened sectors.

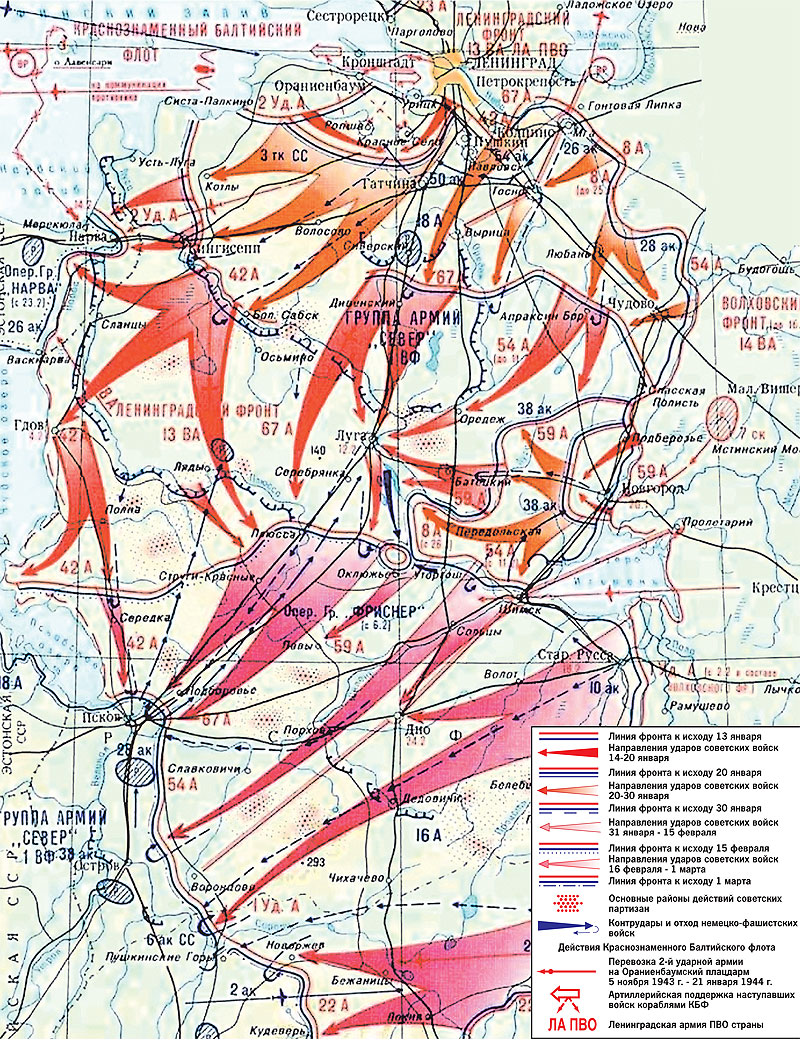
Leningrad-Novgorod Offensive. Note initial position of 59th Army near Novgorod.

In May the headquarters of 52nd Army was moved to the Reserve of the Supreme High Command prior to being reassigned to Steppe Front, and the 225th was moved to 59th Army, still in Volkhov Front. In June the division was assigned to 7th Rifle Corps along with the 229th Division. These command arrangements continued until October when the Corps headquarters was moved to 54th Army and the 225th remained as a separate division in 59th Army. A month later it was assigned to 14th Rifle Corps and it was under these commands at the start of the winter offensive.

=== Novgorod–Luga Offensive ===
The final offensive on Novgorod began on January 14, 1944. It opened with an artillery preparation that unleashed 133,000 shells on the German defenses, and assault detachments from each first echelon rifle battalion in 59th Army began the ground attack at 1050 hours. 14th Corps (225th, 191st and 378th Rifle Divisions) was closest to the objective, with the 225th deployed at the south end of the line. Despite the artillery preparation, the assault by 6th Rifle Corps, north of 14th Corps, stalled after advancing only 1,000m. Fortunately for 6th Corps, a regiment of the 378th attacked prematurely and without orders, taking advantage of the fact that German troops had abandoned their forward works during the artillery preparation, and seized a portion of those defenses. The 1254th Rifle Regiment then joined the attack and the two regiments overcame the first two German trench lines and gained a small bridgehead over the Pitba River at Malovodskoe.

By late on January 16 the 14th Corps had cut the Finev Lug–Novgorod road and 59th Army had torn a 20 km-wide (12 mi) hole in the Germans' main defensive belt. The following day, despite bad weather, difficult terrain and lack of transport, 59th Army was clearly threatening to encircle XXXVIII Army Corps at Novgorod. On the night of January 19 these forces got the order to break out along the last remaining route. The city was liberated on the morning of the 20th, and on the next day most of the survivors of the German corps were surrounded and soon destroyed. In recognition of this feat, the division was honored as follows:

NOVGOROD... 225th Rifle Division (Colonel Olkhovskii, Pyotr Ivanovich)... the troops who participated in the battles with the enemy, and the breakthrough and liberation of Novgorod, by the order of the Supreme High Command of 20 January 1944, and a commendation in Moscow, are given a salute of 20 artillery salvos from 224 guns.

In seven days of combat the 59th Army penetrated strong German defenses, liberated Novgorod, and advanced 20 km (12 mi) westward, widening its penetration to 50 km (31 mi). While doing so it destroyed or seriously damaged two German divisions, one regiment, four separate battalions, and captured 3,000 prisoners.

== Into the Baltic States ==
Within days, as the offensive expanded, the division, with the rest of 14th Corps, was shifted to 8th Army, still in Volkhov Front, and when the Front was disbanded on February 15 the 225th was reassigned to 54th Army in Leningrad Front where it joined the 111th Rifle Corps. Through the rest of the month it advanced southwestward until it reached the Panther Line defenses between Pskov and Ostrov which were too strong to be taken from the march. The division remained in this area until summer. Colonel Olkhovskii left his command on May 28 and was replaced by Col. Mikhail Aleksandrovich Pesochin. The former officer was given command of the 168th Rifle Division several days later and would lead it for the duration, being promoted to the rank of major general on April 20, 1945. Pesochin had previously commanded the 411th and 131st Rifle Divisions.

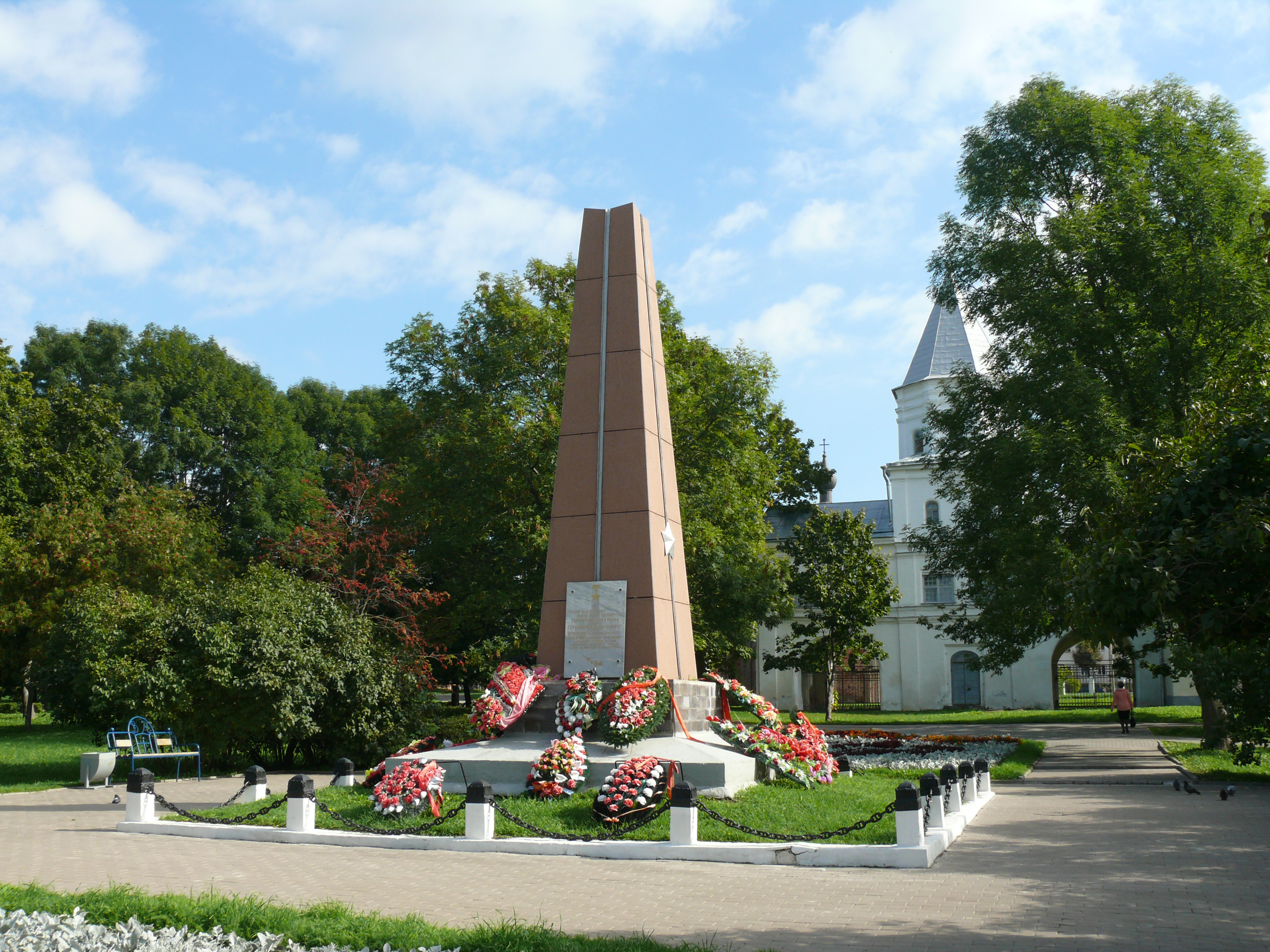
Monument to Gerasimenko, Krasilov and Cheremnov in Novgorod

On February 21 three deceased men of the 299th Rifle Regiment had been made posthumous Heroes of the Soviet Union. During one of the division's first operations along the Volkhov on January 27, 1942, Sgt. Ivan Savvich Gerasimenko, Krasnoarmeets Aleksandr Semyonovich Krasilov, and Krasnoarmeets Leontii Arsentievich Cheremnov, were part of a reconnaissance patrol of 20 men under Gerasimenko's command. After crossing the frozen river in the dark the group was discovered, leading to a firefight in which several German positions were destroyed, but the patrol soon came under machine gun fire from two hidden bunkers. Cheremnov soon sacrificed himself by blocking the embrasure of one bunker with his body, while Gerasimenko and Krasilov soon followed suit against the other. These acts allowed the rest of the patrol to escape the fire and continue the fight from more advantageous positions. The story soon appeared in an article in the Volkhov Front newspaper and spread from there throughout much of the Soviet Union.

When the Pskov-Ostrov Offensive began on July 11 the 54th Army was in 3rd Baltic Front, and the 225th was still facing the Panther Line defenses south of the Novorzhev–Ostrov road. By the beginning of August, after the German line had been penetrated, the division, with its Corps, had reached the Latvian border in the vicinity of Abrene. Later that month the 225th was transferred to 123rd Rifle Corps, still in 54th Army. It continued advancing into Latvia under these commands until by mid-September it had reached the Gulbene area. Later that month it came under direct Army command as it closed on Riga east of Suntaži. Shortly after the fall of Riga on October 13 the 3rd Baltic Front was disbanded and by the beginning of November the 225th was moved to the Reserve of the Supreme High Command where it joined the 55th Rifle Corps in 21st Army. It would remain under these commands for the duration.

== Into Germany and Czechoslovakia ==
In December, 21st Army, commanded by Col. Gen. D. N. Gusev, was transferred to 1st Ukrainian Front, where it would remain for the duration. At this time the 55th Corps consisted of the 225th, 229th and 285th Rifle Divisions. At the start of the Vistula-Oder Offensive on January 12, 1945, the 21st Army was in the Front's reserve and did not see combat until the 17th, when it was committed to the fighting for the Silesian industrial area. By January 28 this area had been cleared and 55th Corps was pulled back to the Army's second echelon in the area northwest of Katowice and partly began moving toward the Oder River where the Army's 117th Rifle Corps was fighting for a bridgehead south of Oppeln.

During February 1-2 the division battled for a bridgehead over the Oder at Schurgast, which involved breaking through a double line of bunkers. Cpl. Sergei Anisimovich Kovalenko, who had previously fought as a partisan in Lithuania, was now a member of the 5th Rifle Company of the 299th Regiment. After several futile efforts to break through with a team of seven volunteers, Kovalenko emulated the three heroes of the Volkhov and blocked the embrasure of a bunker with his body, allowing his comrades to continue the attack successfully. On April 10 he would be posthumously made a Hero of the Soviet Union.

Over the next two weeks the 225th was involved in heavy fighting along the Eastern Neisse, having captured an important bridgehead in the Rausk–Klai–Karbiscau region and continuing to expand it. Between January 31 and February 5 the division accounted for up to 1,500 German officers and men killed or wounded plus 108 prisoners; 36 guns; 63 machine guns; and 154 motor vehicles. At 0600 hours on February 10, after an extensive regrouping, the 299th and 1349th Rifle Regiments attacked German positions at Shedlau, capturing it by 1500. However, powerful counterattacks by infantry and tanks of 20th Panzer Division forced the 1349th to abandon the town. After further heavy and costly fighting the Regiment had the town back in its hands by the end of February 11. During this day Colonel Pesochin was seriously wounded while directing the battle from his observation post. He was evacuated for treatment and while in hospital was promoted to the rank of major general on April 6, but succumbed to his wounds on May 3. Col. Vasilii Aleksandrovich Orlov had taken over command of the division on February 12.

During these actions the 55th Corps had been fighting in conjunction with 31st Tank Corps under direct command of the Front but returned to Gusev's control prior to Athe next stage of the offensive, the encirclement of Breslau. A regrouping took place from February 8-12 which added the 291st Rifle Division to 55th Corps and left the Corps holding an 80km-wide front from Oppeln to Wansen; this allowed the Army's 117th and 118th Rifle Corps to concentrate as a shock group. The offensive was renewed on February 13 and gained up to 10 km (6.2 mi) by the end of February 15 but thereafter slowed significantly due to the presence of significant defensive forces in the area southwest of Breslau. 21st Army would require a break to restore its offensive capabilities. At least some of the Front's rifle divisions by now were reduced to roughly 3,000 personnel.

=== Upper Silesian Offensive ===
At the beginning of March there was still a large German grouping holding a salient stretching eastward nearly to Oppeln and this was the target for a new drive by 21st, 59th, 60th, 5th Guards Armies, plus 4th Tank Army. 21st Army formed a shock group which was to attack in the direction of Priborn with the objective of reaching Münsterberg by the end of the second day, in cooperation with the 34th Guards Rifle and the 4th Guards Tank Corps. Gusev would commit eight rifle divisions, five of which would be in the first echelon. 55th Corps would launch a supporting attack with the 285th Division on a 2km-wide sector between the Neisse and Rogau and the 229th in second echelon; the 225th, defending a 26 km (16 mi) sector from Gross Mangersdorf to Zachrau, would launch pinning attacks against the German forces it faced. Subsequently 55th Corps was to take up the main role in destroying the encircled grouping.

21st Army's part in the offensive began at 0600 hours on March 15 with an attack by its forward battalions, followed by the main forces at 1020. The forward battalions followed on the heels of a 10-minute artillery onslaught and units of the 117th and 118th Corps quickly seized their first objectives; these attacks were so successful that General Gusev ordered the artillery preparation for the main forces shortened to 40 minutes, but this proved a mistake and caused the advance to slow later in the day. Overnight the German forces facing 21st and 4th Tank Armies were reinforced by the 10th Panzergrenadier and 19th Panzer Divisions and during March 16 the Soviet Armies had to repel numerous counterattacks. Despite this, elements of 55th Corps managed to advance up to 10 km (6.2 mi) during the day.

The next day the 117th Corps' 120th Rifle Division, along with 10th Tank Corps, reached the Neisse in the Rothaus–Mansdorf area, completing the penetration of the German defenses, and on March 18 the 117th and 55th Corps advanced another 15 km (9.3 mi), capturing 55 towns and villages, and finally linking up with 59th Army near Neustadt, completing the encirclement. Over the next two days the pocket would be eliminated. 55th Corps was tasked with splitting and destroying those forces in the western part of the wooded area between Oppeln and the Steinau River. For this purpose the 225th launched an attack with its right flank along the railroad in the direction of Falkenberg and Siefersdorf, and with its left flank toward Gumpertzdorf and Goldmor. A breakout attempt against 59th Army's 391st Rifle Division was stymied by the start of the general offensive to clear the pocket. As the operation continued the Front commander, Marshal I. S. Konev, was present at Gusev's observation post on the afternoon of March 19 and issued the following order:

To the battalion, regimental and division commanders of the 225th, 285th, 229th, and 120th rifle divisions. The encircled enemy is trying to break out in the direction of Steinau. The enemy is demoralized and is trying to break out in small groups, without his equipment. I order: 1. To destroy and capture the escaping enemy forces before night. All sergeants and officers are to audaciously and bravely attack the enemy. Do not shame the troops of the 21st and 4th Guards Tank armies and do not let the enemy out of the encirclement...

Before this order was issued the 225th and 229th Divisions had cleared out the western part of the wooded area southwest of Oppeln and both banks of the Steinau. By the night of March 19/20 both divisions had been transferred to the Steinau area to reinforce 4th Guards Tanks.

On March 20 the trapped grouping made a further attempt to break out in the direction of Steinau but this failed. By 1600 hours the 55th and 117th Corps had mopped up the remnant forces in the Erlenburg–Lesthal–Elgut area. On the same day Colonel Orlov left the division and was replaced by Col. Pavel Aleksandrovich Murashov, who had previously commanded the 55th Guards and 282nd Rifle Divisions. This officer would remain in command into peacetime. With the conclusion of the encirclement battle the 21st and 4th Guards Tanks were ordered to continue advancing westward in the direction of the town of Neisse. After a regrouping on March 22 the 55th Corps, along with 10th Guards Tank Corps, began the assault at 0810 hours on March 23 following a 65-minute artillery preparation along an 8km-wide front. The immediate objective was the town of Bilau, followed by the Bila River. In the day's fighting the Corps advanced up to 10 km (6.2 mi) and broke into the southern outskirts of Neisse; fighting for the town raged overnight until it was cleared jointly with 117th Corps by the end of March 24. Late that day, in his Order No. 307, Stalin expressed his thanks to the 21st and 4th Guards for this success. On March 27 the 21st consolidated along the Bila and went over to the defense. In a further honor on April 5 the 225th was awarded the Order of Kutuzov, 2nd Degree, for its successes in the Silesian campaigns.

== Postwar ==
Beginning on April 6 the 1st Ukrainian Front carried out a major regrouping prior to the Berlin operation. 21st Army handed its sector over to 59th Army while it took over the sector of 5th Guards Army. This increased the length of the Army's sector to 97 km (60 mi), and consequently it remained on the defensive until after the fall of the German capital. Following this it joined its Front in advancing into Czechoslovakia toward Prague.

At the time of the German surrender the men and women of the division shared the full title of 225th Rifle, Novgorod, Order of the Red Banner, Order of Kutuzov Division. (Russian: 225-я стрелковая Новгородская Краснознамённая ордена Кутузова дивизия.) STAVKA Order No. 11096 of May 29, 1945, part 8, listed the 225th one of the rifle divisions to be "disbanded in place". It was disbanded in accordance with the directive in June.
