= 33rd Army Corps (Soviet Union) =

Former Soviet Army corps

The 33rd Army Corps was a corps of the Soviet Ground Forces, active from 1957 to 1991.

The 119th Rifle Corps was originally established in late 1943 as part of the 8th Army, but was quickly transferred to the 1st Shock Army.

Fighting through the Baltic States, the 1st Shock Army finished the war as part of the Courland Group of Forces that had trapped the German Army Group Kurland in the northern reaches of Latvia. In January 1945, as part of the 1st Shock Army, the 119th Rifle Corps comprised the 53rd Guards, 374th, and 376th Rifle Divisions.

108th, 7th, 119th, and 123rd Rifle Corps all fought the Germans around Staroselye in April. This offensive was part of maintaining pressure on the Courland Pocket.

In May 1945, the 1st Shock Army commanded four Rifle Corps: the 1st; the 8th Estonian; the 119th Rifle Corps (201st, 360th and 374th Rifle Divisions), and the 123rd Rifle Corps.

After the end of World War II the 1st Shock Army headquarters was used to reform the Turkestan Military District. The 119th Rifle Corps arrived in the TurVO and set up its headquarters at Stalinabad (Dushanbe) with the 201st (Dushanbe), 360th (Termez), and 374th Rifle Divisions (Chardzhou). On 30 October 1945 the 374th Rifle Division left 119th Rifle Corps and was replaced by 306th Rifle Division. However, in May 1946 306th Rifle Division was disbanded.

After a number of changes to 119th Rifle Corps, including 201st RD being reduced in status to a brigade for eight months, in 1950 it comprised the 201st Mountain Rifle Division at Dushanbe and the 376th Mountain Rifle Division at Osh. In June 1955 the corps was renumbered the 33rd Rifle Corps and the divisions renumbered the 27th and 71st Mountain Rifle Divisions.

In June 1957 the 33rd Rifle Corps was renamed the 33rd Army Corps. In 1968 the now-33rd Army Corps moved from Dushanbe to Kemerovo in the Siberian Military District.

In 1968 the corps was transferred into the Siberian Military District from the Turkestan Military District, establishing its headquarters at Kemerovo. The 13th Motor Rifle Division at Biysk was assigned to it. Among the mobilisation divisions formed in the district from the late 1970s was the 167th Motor Rifle Division, whose equipment storage area was co-located with the barracks of the 13th MRD.

In 1989 the corps included:

- 33rd Army Corps (33-й армейский корпус) - Kemerovo
  - 5349th Weaponry and Equipment Storage Base (5352-я БХВТ) in Biysk since 1989. Previously the 1010th Territorial Training Center (1010-й территориальный учебный центр) itself formed on the base of the 167th Motor Rifle Division [cadred] (167-я мотострелковая дивизия (кадра)) in 1987.
  - 5350th Weaponry and Equipment Storage Base (5350-я БХВТ) in Abakan since 1985. Previously the 242nd Motor Rifle Division.
  - 5351st Weaponry and Equipment Storage Base (5351-я БХВТ) in Biysk since 1989. Previously the 13th Motor Rifle Division
  - 5352nd Weaponry and Equipment Storage Base (5352-я БХВТ). Previously the 62nd Motor Rifle Division (62-я мотострелковая дивизия). Moved from Itatka village, Tomsk Oblast, to Omsk in 1989.

The 33rd Army Corps disbanded in July 1991 and its personnel and assets were absorbed by the arriving 28th Army Corps from Czechoslovakia. General Major Nikolai Loktionov remained in command of the merged formation, having been appointed as the 33rd Army Corps commander in June 1991.
