= 111th Rifle Corps =

- Active: October 1943 – January 1946
- Country: Soviet Union
- Branch: Red Army
- Type: Rifle corps
- Engagements: Leningrad–Novgorod Offensive; Pskov-Ostrov Offensive; Riga Offensive

The 111th Rifle Corps (Russian: 111-й стрелковый корпус) was an infantry corps of the Red Army during World War II.

Its headquarters was formed with the 54th Army of the Volkhov Front in mid-November 1943, and with its assigned divisions fought in the Leningrad–Novgorod Offensive during January and February 1944. The corps then fought in failed attempts to break the Panther Line for the next several months and the Pskov-Ostrov Offensive in July. Its headquarters was transferred to the 67th Army and with a different set of divisions fought in the Riga Offensive in September. During late 1944 and early 1945 it served on garrison duty in southern Estonia and Latvia, then participated in the disarmament and collection of German prisoners of the war surrendered in the Courland Pocket in early May. Postwar, the corps was disbanded in early 1946.

== World War II ==
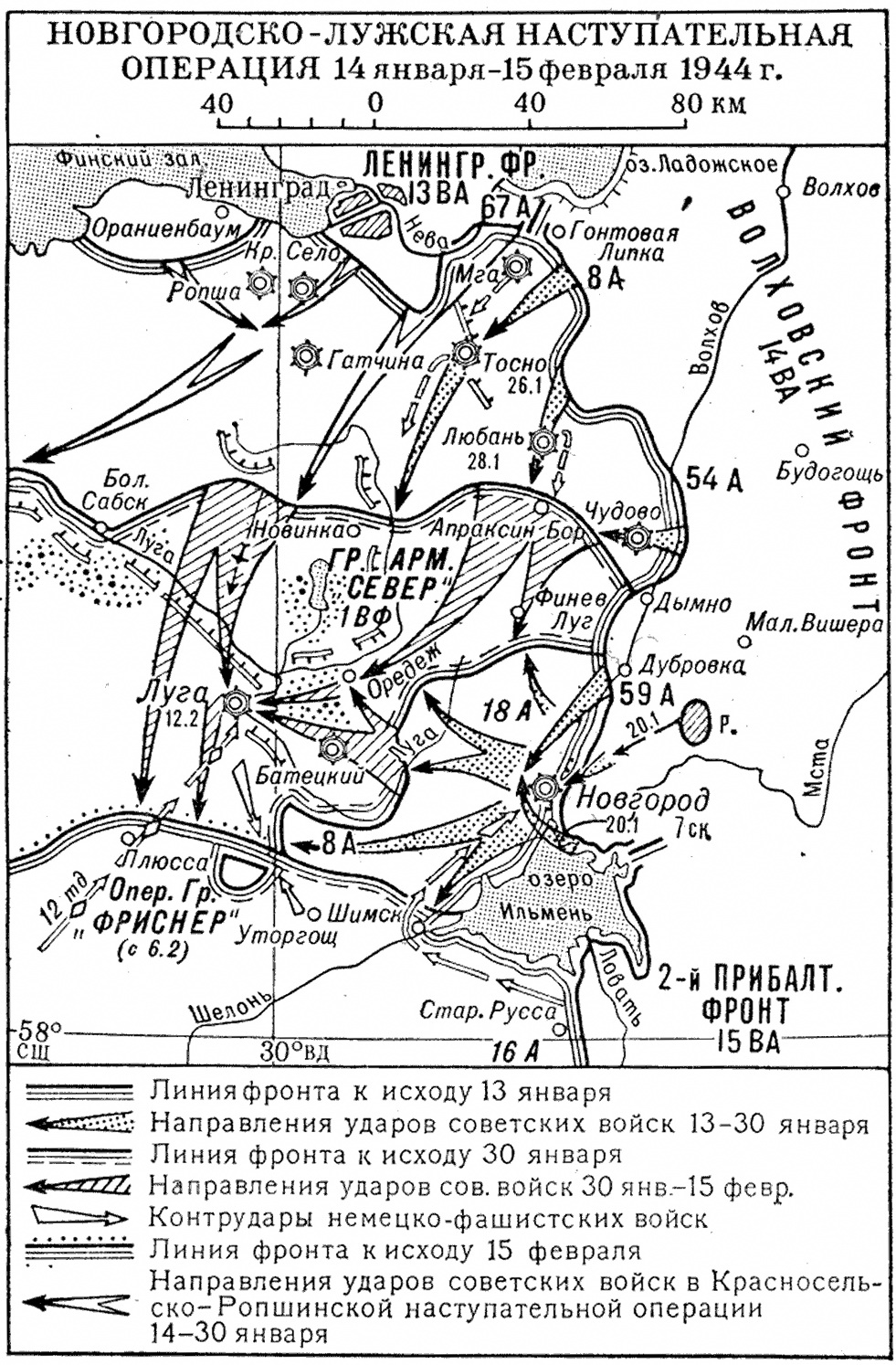
The Novgorod–Luga Offensive of the Leningrad–Novgorod Strategic Offensive

The headquarters of the 111th Rifle Corps was formed in early November 1943 under the command of Major General Boris Rozhdestvensky, who led it for the rest of the war, part of the 54th Army of the Volkhov Front. Corps troops, formed along with the headquarters, included the 551st Separate Communications Battalion and the 3907th Field Postal Station. Upon formation, it was assigned the 44th and 288th Rifle Divisions and the 53rd Rifle Brigade. The 53rd Rifle Brigade transferred to the 115th Rifle Corps in December. The corps fought in the Leningrad–Novgorod Offensive in January and February 1944, recapturing Chudovo, Shimsk, Soltsy, Dno, and Porkhov in cooperation with the 119th Rifle Corps.

During January, the 288th went into front reserve and the 18th and 80th Rifle Divisions joined the corps. In late January, the corps advanced toward Chudovo against the German 21st Infantry Division, capturing the town with a three-pronged attack by the 44th Rifle Division and the 14th and 53rd Rifle Brigades. The 18th and 80th were transferred in February, while the 288th returned to the corps, which was joined by the 225th Rifle Division. The corps rejoined 54th Army on 11 February after the army headquarters was relocated to the left flank of the front. The Volkhov Front was disbanded by an order of 13 February and the corps and army transferred to the Leningrad Front . In conjunction with the 14th Guards Rifle Corps of the 1st Shock Army, the 111th attacked the town of Dno late on 23 February, but both corps were repulsed by German counterattacks. On the next day, a renewed assault by the 44th and 288th Divisions and attached 16th Tank Brigade of the 111th and a rifle division, brigade, and tank regiment of the 14th Guards took the town. The corps fought in the recapture of Porkhov on 26 February, then fought with the army in unsuccessful attempts to break the Panther Line. It would include the 44th, 225th, and 288th Divisions until July. The 54th Army transferred to the 3rd Baltic Front in April. The 393rd Field Vehicle Repair Base was formed by 1 June as a corps unit.

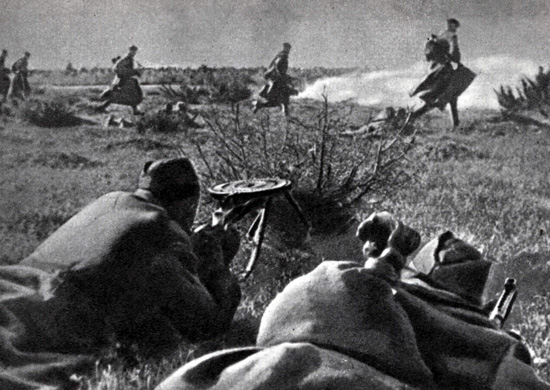
Soviet troops in battle near Riga, October 1944

From mid-to-late July, the corps fought in the Pskov-Ostrov Offensive. The 44th Rifle Division was transferred in July, being replaced by the 321st Rifle Division. Leaving its divisions behind, the corps headquarters was transferred to the 67th Army of the front in August, being assigned the 85th, 196th, and 377th Rifle Divisions. With the 67th Army, the corps fought near the Tišupe and Gauja Rivers, then in the Riga Offensive in September, during which it helped recapture Riga. The 85th was transferred in September and replaced by the 191st Rifle Division from front reserve. The 191st and 377th were transferred in October, while the 189th Rifle Division joined the corps, whose army returned to the Leningrad Front, with which it remained for the rest of the war.

=== Garrison duty ===
After the Riga Offensive, the corps, with the 189th and 196th Divisions and the 14th Fortified Region, was made responsible for the defense of the eastern coast of the Pärnu Bay and Riga Bay from Ranna in southern Estonia to Sildzeņi in northern Latvia and garrisoning Pärnu, Ainaži, Salacgrīva, and other large settlements along the coastline by an order of 21 October. The corps and the 14th Fortified Region were headquartered at Pärnu, while the 196th was at Ainaži and the 189th at Kodara. While on garrison duty, the corps conducted combat training in preparation for participation in the blockade of the Courland Pocket. The 189th and the 196th would remain with the corps for the rest of the war. Transferring the 14th Fortified Region and its defensive sector to the direct subordination of the army headquarters, the corps made a march of between 170 and 200 kilometers to Riga between 16 and 19 February 1945 to hold defensive positions on Riga Bay. The 189th was headquartered in the artillery barracks in Čiekurkalns, the 196th in the western part of Riga, and the corps at Vecmīlgrāvis.

Between 10 and 12 April the two rifle divisions turned over their sectors to three separate machine gun artillery battalions in order to conduct battalion-level training at the army training center. On the night of 16–17 April they marched to new concentrations areas southwest of Riga, with the 196th holding positions from Melluži southwest to Mezakakts and the Sproģis forest, and the 189th from Plostmuiža and the forests south of the latter west to Virknes and Sumragi. The corps was headquartered slightly north of Virknes. The 382nd Rifle Division, which was sent by rail, joined the corps on 17 April and began taking positions from near Mangali south to Līvbērze, arriving within the next ten days. In its new positions, the corps continued combat training. During the month, the 67th Army was reinforced by two more rifle corps.

=== Courland Pocket ===
The corps planned for an operation to break through the German line between Rasas and the Abava river, defended by the 81st Infantry Division, from 25 April. On the night of 6–7 May, the German troops began withdrawing from the defensive line towards the north and northwest, covered by small rearguard detachments. On the morning of 7 May, the 196th was directly subordinated to the army command. As a result of the German withdrawal, the corps began advancing on 10:00 on 7 May in the second echelon of the army, behind the 377th Rifle Division. By the end of the day, the 382nd had reached the line of Pampji and the south bank of the ravine 700 meters north of Tyuti to the west of the 189th, which reached the area of Kūlaini and Jahthaus; the corps' positions were roughly 2 kilometers south of the German rearguard at Bluiskas. At 24:00, the 377th, which had advanced to a line between Irlava Manor and Rēpiņi, was operationally subordinated to the corps.

During the night of 7–8 May, the corps' assault battalions pursued the German rearguard from Bluiskas to the line of Kalninkas and Jaunmokas Manor to the west of Tukums, where they encountered the most organized resistance. Dislodging the German rearguard, the corps continued to advance and by the end of the day on 8 May the 377th had reached Vilksalu manor to the northwest of Tukums after three German battalions surrendered to it. To the west, the 189th's forward units were between two kilometers southwest of Vilksalu manor and Bāliņi, and on the corps' left flank the 382nd was at Sērmuļi and Skrimbas. The German forces opposing the corps refused to accept battle and began a general surrender at 24:00.

The corps, with the 189th and 196th Divisions, marched to the area of Talsi and Dundaga on 9 and 10 May to collect and disarm the surrendered German forces of the 207th Security Division and other units of Army Group Courland. The 196th was near Talsi and the 189th near Dundaga by the end of 10 May, and the corps headquarters was at Talsi from 9 May. The 377th and 382nd were directly subordinated to the army headquarters on 9 May. Until 12 May, the two divisions supervised the disarmament and the collection of weapons and equipment, handed over by the German commanders. The German prisoners of war were held in divisional POW camps, and then sent to Līvbērze via Talsi and Tukums.

== Postwar ==
In August 1945, the corps was withdrawn from Latvia to the Voronezh Military District, where it was headquartered at Voronezh. The 189th and 382nd Rifle Divisions were located at Voronezh, while the 196th was at Borisoglebsk. The corps was disbanded in January 1946, still under Rozhdestvensky's command. The 189th and 196th were relocated to Bakhmach and Konotop, respectively, while the 382nd was disbanded within months of the corps.
