= 321st Rifle Division =

321st Rifle Division (September 24, 1941 – October 31, 1941) 321st Rifle Division (February 26, 1942 – March 19, 1943) 321st Rifle Division (May 9, 1944 – 1947)
- Active: 1941–1947
- Country: Soviet Union
- Branch: Red Army
- Type: Infantry
- Size: Division
- Engagements: Crimean Campaign; Battle of Stalingrad; Operation Uranus; Operation Little Saturn; Operation Bagration; Vistula-Oder Offensive; East Prussian Offensive; East Pomeranian Offensive; Battle of Berlin
- Decorations: Order of the Red Banner (3rd formation)
- Battle honours: Chudovo (3rd formation); Dno (3rd formation)

Commanders
- Notable commanders: Col. Ivan Mikhailovich Aliev; Lt. Col. Aleksei Ivanovich Valugin; Maj. Gen. Ivan Alekseevich Makarenko; Col. Vasilii Konstantinovich Chesnokov

The 321st Rifle Division was formed in September 1941, as a standard Red Army rifle division, based on an existing division of militia. This formation had an extremely short career, coming under devastating attack in the north of the Crimea on the day of its redesignation and being officially disbanded just over a month later. A second division began forming in the Transbaikal in February 1942, and served in the defensive and offensive fighting around Stalingrad, eventually distinguishing itself sufficiently to be redesignated as the 82nd Guards Rifle Division. The world had not seen the last of the 321st, however, as a new division was formed from two existing rifle brigades in the spring of 1944, which gave very creditable service for the duration, completing its combat path in northeastern Germany, and serving into the postwar period.

== 1st Formation ==
The 2nd Crimea Militia Division began forming on August 20, 1941 at Yevpatoria. By September 11 it was considered "ready for the front", like its "sister", the 1st Crimea Militia Division. On September 24 the division was redesignated as the 321st Rifle Division. It came under the command of Col. Ivan Mikhailovich Aliev on the same day. Its basic order of battle was as follows:

- 484th Rifle Regiment
- 488th Rifle Regiment
- 493rd Rifle Regiment
- 986th Artillery Regiment

Colonel Aliev would remain in command of the 1st Formation for its short existence. The division was assigned to 51st Army of Crimean Front but was still forming up in October, now in the Separate Coastal Army, when the German 11th Army broke into the Crimea from the north, through the Perekop Isthmus. The 321st was directly in the path of this offensive. After being thrown out of its positions the army commander, Gen. Ivan Petrov, ordered a retreat back to Yevpatoria. On October 31 the German motorized advance detachment of 11th Army captured that city, and the 321st had already been cut off and reduced to fragments. As there were no resources in the Crimea to rebuild the division, on that same date the 321st was officially disbanded.

== 2nd Formation ==
A new division began forming on February 26, 1942 in Chita Oblast in the Transbaikal Military District. Its order of battle remained the same as that of the first formation. Lt. Col. Aleksei Ivanovich Valugin was appointed to command on the same date, and he would hold that post, in the same rank, for nearly six months. Although the divisional headquarters formed at Chita, the division's components were formed all over the Transbaikal and the Mongolian People's Republic. In March, the division was noted as having 85% of its personnel of Yakut or Buryat nationality. In May and June the division was assigned to 36th Army in Transbaikal Front for training, and in July was railed west, where it arrived in the 21st Army of Stalingrad Front on July 20.

The 321st saw its first action nine days later, following these orders from the STAVKA to Stalingrad Front:

[T]he Front's main mission over the next few days is, at all cost, to defeat the enemy who have reached the western bank of the Don River south of Nizhne-Chirskaya by no later than July 30 by... the employment of 204th and 321st Rifle Divisions and 23rd Tank Corps, which have reached the Kalach region...

As with many others, the planned assault faltered with very little to show for it, largely because not enough time was available to coordinate and control it properly. By early August the division had been transferred to the 4th Tank Army which was trying to hold a 50km-wide bridgehead on the west bank of the Don while also protecting the approaches to Stalingrad from the northwest. The 321st did its best to reinforce the army's right flank. On August 13, German Sixth Army launched a diversionary attack against this flank with its XI Army Corps. As reported to the STAVKA:

321st RD conducted fierce fighting with an enemy force of up to a regiment of infantry with 50-60 tanks beginning at 0630 hours... and, under pressure, the units of the division withdrew [10-15km] to the Malyi Iarki-Mokryi Log Balka-Hill 134.4 line at 1430 hours. Fighting is raging along this line...

The attack forced the division to withdraw, as the Sixth Army commander, Gen. Paulus, expected, and 4th Tank Army reinforced the sector with antitank assets. In spite of this setback, the division was in better state than most of the rest of its army, which was rapidly being encircled; on August 14, 4th Tank Army reported the 321st had a total of 7,544 men. In conjunction with arriving forces of 1st Guards Army, the 321st was ordered into a counterstroke on August 17 to try to retrieve the situation, but this effort failed, and on August 20 its strength had fallen to 4,356 men. Only the timely arrival of 38th and 40th Guards Rifle Divisions prevented the German corps from liquidating the narrow bridgehead south of the Don from Kremenskaya to Sirotinskaya. This bridgehead would later cause the German Army much grief. However, the 321st was by now decimated, and was transferred to 1st Guards Army.

On August 24 Maj. Gen. Ivan Alekseevich Makarenko took command of the division, which he would hold for the duration of the 2nd Formation. As of September 3 the division was back in 21st Army, still in the Kremenskaya bridgehead. On the following day it was ordered to attack XI Corps again, in an attempt to prevent 22nd Panzer Division from moving eastward towards Stalingrad. This made little impression, and for the next months the 321st continued to hold its positions and rebuild.

=== Operation Uranus ===
In November the division was transferred to 65th Army (the former 4th Tank Army) on the right flank of Don Front. In the planning for Operation Uranus, 21st Army was to have a leading role in breaking out of the Kletskaya bridgehead, but the 65th was to provide support on its left. On November 19 the 321st concentrated its forces on a 4km sector from Melo-Kletskii to Melo-Logovskii. Its immediate objective was to strike southwards on both sides of the Mokryi Log Balka, which was the boundary between Romanian Third Army and German Sixth Army, and force them apart. In the event, the 321st and the neighboring 304th Rifle Division ran up against skillfully fortified German strongpoints which pinned them down, leading to negligible gains. On the third day, these divisions were still grinding forward, forcing the 376th Infantry Division to fall back to its next positions, but the 321st had to be partially pulled out for rest and refitting. On the 23rd the division was ordered to reinforce 4th Guards Rifle Division to seize Khmelevskii. On this same day, Sixth Army was encircled, and the battle became a siege.

Due to orders from the STAVKA, on November 27 the 321st, plus two other divisions of 65th Army, redeployed south to reinforce 5th Tank Army, which was struggling to capture German strongpoints on the Don and Chir Rivers. By the next day the division, along with 40th Guards Rifle Division, was getting into position to attack the German positions at Oblivskaia. On November 30, an attack by the 321st, a regiment of guardsmen, and two cavalry divisions, failed to take this strongpoint, although some gains were made. In the following days, the division was ordered to go to the defensive.

On December 6 the 321st and the neighboring 119th Rifle Divisions were ordered to prepare an attack to begin at dawn on December 9 to "force the [Chir] river, seize a bridgehead, and protect the commitment of the [newly-arrived 5th Mechanized] corps during the first half of the day." On the appointed day and time two regiments of each division attacked on a 6km-wide sector from the outskirts of Surovikino westwards to the village of Sekretov, easily crossing the frozen surface of the river, with two mechanized brigades concentrated in the rear, ready to exploit southward. However, the advance battalions of the rifle regiments came up against heavy fire from Group Stahel's Battlegroup Weicke, defending the south bank with the 301st Panzer Detachment and an Estonian police battalion. As well, German artillery delivered heavy flanking fire on the riflemen, forcing them to go to ground. General Romanenko, commander of 5th Tank Army, was present, and ordered that the offensive be postponed until the next day, when it would be spearheaded by the mechanized troops. On December 10 the 321st successfully eliminated the German bridgehead on the north bank at Sekretov, but remained unable to force its own way across.

=== Operation Little Saturn ===
The next phase of Soviet operations against the Axis forces in the Stalingrad region began on December 16. At this time the 321st was one of six rifle divisions in 5th Tank Army. The Army had been reduced by transfers to 5th Shock Army and its 1st Tank Corps was "burned out" from previous fighting so its role in the offensive, beginning on December 18, was primarily to pin down the 11th Panzer Division on the lower Chir to prevent it intervening to assist the Italian Eighth Army, which was the main target of the offensive. 5th Mechanized Corps attacked out of the narrow bridgehead it had won a week earlier, while the 321st began its assault across the river before dawn, seizing the village of Dalne-Podgorskii with small forward detachments, before the defenders could react. These were followed by the main forces of the division's regiments, which drove southward, overwhelming the defenses of 7th German Air Force Division's Battlegroup Wagner and throwing them back 6 - 8km to the rear. The combined attack threatened to turn the flanks of not just the 7th GAF but the 336th Infantry Division as well. This forced 11th Panzer to intervene on the 19th, engaging 5th Mechanized west of Sovkhoz No. 79. The accounts of this fighting from each side vary greatly, but it appears that the German armor recaptured about half the ground lost by 7th GAF the day before. 5th Mechanized stabilized the situation by the end of the day in heavy fighting, and the resistance of both this unit and the 321st on December 20 forced 11th Panzer to give up its hopes of restoring the defenses along the Chir and go over to the defense. After continued fighting over the next two days, 5th Mechanized handed its sector over to the 321st and moved back to replenish after heavy losses. As of December 29 the division was maintaining its pressure, along with 40th and 54th Guards Rifle Divisions on Group Stahel of Corps Mieth in its Tormosin salient between the Don and Chir rivers.

Following the German surrender in Stalingrad, the 321st continued to serve under 5th Tank Army in the following offensives into the lower Don and Donbas regions. In recognition of these successes, on March 19, 1943, the division was re-designated as the 82nd Guards Rifle Division.

== 3rd Formation ==
After an absence of over a year from the Red Army order of battle, a new 321st Rifle Division began forming from April to May 9, 1944, in the 1st Shock Army of 2nd Baltic Front, based on cadres from the 14th Rifle Brigade and the 137th Rifle Brigade.

=== 14th Rifle Brigade ===
This brigade was formed as a student brigade from training (reserve) units in the North Caucasus Military District in October 1941. It was assigned to the Moscow Military District in December. During that month it helped to defend the capital, before being reassigned to the 1st Guards Rifle Corps in the reserves of Northwestern Front. The brigade served in the difficult fighting around Demyansk through the late winter until the rasputitsa intervened. At this point it was pulled back to the reserves for rebuilding, then was committed again in June 1942, now directly under 1st Shock Army in the same Front. In October it was back in 1st Guards Rifle Corps, and took part in several other fruitless attacks around Demyansk which left it so depleted that it was withdrawn all the way to the Volga Military District for another rebuilding at the end of the year.

In early February 1943, the brigade was railed north to join Volkhov Front, and it joined 54th Army prior to Operation Polar Star. In the event this offensive made few gains on this part of the front. In July, German Army intelligence, based on prisoners and captured documents, identified the order of battle of the brigade as follows:

- 3 rifle battalions, each:
  - 3 rifle companies (50 - 60 men, 6 - 8 light machine guns, 2 50mm mortars each)
  - 1 machine gun company with 5 - 6 heavy machine guns
  - 1 mortar company with 5 - 6 82mm mortars
  - 1 sub-machine gun platoon
  - 1 AT rifle platoon
  - 1 reconnaissance (scout) platoon
- 1 sapper company
- 1 reconnaissance company
- 1 artillery battalion with horse drawn 45mm and 76mm cannon

By September each rifle battalion had been reinforced as follows:

- 1 antitank company (4 76mm cannon)
- 1 sniper platoon
- 1 sub-machine gun company (expanded from the platoon of July)

After the end of 1943 the brigade was assigned to the 115th Rifle Corps, still in 54th Army. During the Leningrad-Novgorod Offensive the 14th was one of the units credited for the liberation of Chudovo on January 29, 1944, and was given its name as an honorific. When Volkhov Front was disbanded in February 1944, the 14th was moved back to 1st Shock Army, now in 2nd Baltic Front. In April it was pulled back from the front lines and disbanded.

=== 137th Rifle Brigade ===
Forming in December 1941, in the Siberian Military District, this brigade was moving in the Reserve of the Supreme High Command by the end of February 1942, and joined 54th Army in Leningrad Front in March, just south of Lake Ladoga. the 54th was moved to Volkhov Front by June, and the 137th was assigned to 4th Guards Rifle Corps. In August and September the brigade fought under these commands in the Second Sinyavino Operation. Badly damaged, like most other Soviet units in this offensive, it was removed to Moscow Military District for rebuilding.

Once rested and restored, in February 1943, the 137th was briefly assigned to the new 68th Army forming behind Northwestern Front. By the beginning of April it was moved to 1st Shock Army, but by the end of June the unit was back in the reserves of the Front. In September it joined 34th Army, also in Northwestern Front, where it fought both as a separate unit and as part of 96th Rifle Corps. It was in 14th Guards Rifle Corps of 1st Shock during the Leningrad-Novgorod Offensive on February 24, 1944, when it shared credit with several other units for the liberation of the key transport hub of Dno and according was given the town's name as an honorific. The brigade remained in 1st Shock until April when it was disbanded.

== Baltic Campaign ==
The new division inherited the battle honors from these brigades; it also inherited the Order of the Red Banner from the 14th. Col. Vasilii Konstantinovich Chesnokov was given command of the division, which he would hold until the end of the war. The division's order of battle remained the same as that of the first two formations. It was assigned to the 90th Rifle Corps. By mid-June the division was probably still absorbing and training new men, and the corps itself was only recently formed, so at the outset of Operation Bagration it was given a relatively easy assignment: holding attacks against units of German 16th Army.

On July 8, as its Front entered the general offensive, the 321st was facing the German Panther Line defenses about 20 km east of Ostrov. After a severe battle of attrition, the city was finally liberated on the 21st. A few days later, the division was transferred to the 111th Rifle Corps of 54th Army in 3rd Baltic Front, and by August 1 was advancing into Latvia. Before the month's end it was back in 1st Shock Army, which was now also in 3rd Baltic Front, and by September 12 the 321st had reached positions north of Gulbene, nearly on the Estonian border. The attrition had taken its toll, and a few days later the division was withdrawn to the Reserve of the Supreme High Command for rebuilding; while there it was assigned to the 116th Rifle Corps of 2nd Shock Army. It would remain under these commands for the duration. By the end of October the 2nd Shock Army was assigned to 2nd Belorussian Front, where it would also serve for the duration.

== Into Germany ==
With the rest of its Front, the 321st participated in the Vistula-Oder Offensive. When the Front's attack began on January 14, 1945, 2nd Shock Army was tasked to break out of the Rozan bridgehead across the Narew River, with the immediate goal of taking the town of Ciechanow and then, in conjunction with 65th Army, to eliminate the enemy in the Pultusk area. The 321st, along with its corps, was in reserve, and did not see action on that first day, nor the following. On the 17th, 2nd Shock liberated Ciechanow, but 116th Corps remained in second echelon.

By February 20, when the offensive was about to enter its second stage, the 321st was fighting, along with its corps and army, on the line of the Nogat and Vistula Rivers. As it entered its third stage on March 6, units of the 116th Corps, with the support of 8th Guards Tank Corps, broke through the German defenses and began fighting street-by-street for the town of Preussisch Stargard. Following this fighting in East Prussia the division was redeployed to take part in the East Pomeranian Offensive, and then the Berlin Strategic Offensive Operation, ending the war near Stralsund on the Baltic coast.

== Postwar ==
By the conclusion of hostilities, the division had been awarded the full title of 321st Rifle, Chudovo-Dno, Order of the Red Banner Division (Russian: 321-я стрелковая Чудовско-Дновская Краснознамённая дивизия). It became part of the Group of Soviet Forces in Germany, still in the 116th Rifle Corps of 2nd Shock Army, where it remained until being withdrawn to Dnipropetrovsk in the Kharkov Military District in February 1946. The division became part of the 14th Guards Rifle Corps and in May 1946 became the 38th Rifle Brigade. The brigade and its corps became part of the Kiev Military District months later. In March 1947, the brigade was disbanded.
