= 411th Rifle Division =

- Active: 1941–1942
- Country: Soviet Union
- Branch: Red Army
- Type: Division
- Role: Infantry
- Engagements: Battle of Moscow; Second Battle of Kharkov

Commanders
- Notable commanders: Col. Mikhail Aleksandrovich Pesochin

The 411th Rifle Division was formed in September 1941 as an infantry division of the Red Army, at Chuhuiv in eastern Ukraine. It was a "sister" unit to the 393rd Rifle Division, which was formed at about the same time and place and shared a very similar combat path during 1941-42. The division was assigned to the southern sector of the Soviet-German front during the winter counteroffensive, but was encircled during the German spring offensive that formed the Izium Pocket; unable to escape as a formed unit, the scattered survivors were not sufficient to warrant rebuilding the division, and it was officially disbanded on June 30, 1942. The 411th had one of the shortest and least distinguished careers of any Soviet rifle division.

== Formation ==
The division was formed in August and September, 1941 in the Kharkov Military District. Like the 393rd Rifle Division, it was probably formed from a cadre of militia raised in the Kharkov area from late August. Its order of battle, based on the first wartime shtat (table of organization and equipment) for rifle divisions, was as follows:

- 678th Rifle Regiment
- 686th Rifle Regiment
- 689th Rifle Regiment
- 965th Artillery Regiment
- 68th Antitank Battalion
- 421st Anti-aircraft Battery (later 689th Antiaircraft Battalion)
- 546th Mortar Battalion
- 464th Reconnaissance Company
- 683rd Sapper Battalion
- 853rd Signal Battalion
- 487th Medical/Sanitation Battalion
- 480th Chemical Protection (Anti-gas) Company
- 303rd Motor Transport Company
- 318th Field Bakery
- 830th Divisional Veterinary Hospital (later 712th)
- 1413th Field Postal Station
- 760th Field Office of the State Bank

In September, the division was briefly assigned to the re-forming 10th Army, in the Reserve of the Supreme High Command. In the following month the division was reassigned to 6th Army in Southwestern Front, where it would remain for the remainder of its existence. The division took part in the winter counter-offensive which led to the creation of the Izium salient south of Kharkov.

The only recorded commander of the division was Col. Mikhail Aleksandrovich Pesochin, who took command on April 15, 1942.

== Second Battle of Kharkov ==
When the Soviet offensive to liberate Kharkov began on May 12, the 411th was part of the southern shock group, which was intended to advance northwards to the city from the Izium-Barvenkovo salient. The division was teamed with the 266th Rifle Division; each division had a fairly narrow penetration sector of about 4 km and they were supported by considerable artillery and tank assets. They faced the German 454th Security Division, which comprised mainly second-rate infantry with inadequate artillery support. In the first half of the day the Soviet divisions smashed the resistance of the German 208th and 375th Infantry Regiments, and by day's end reached the bank of the Orel River on a front from Novo-Semyonovka to Marevka.

The southern shock group resumed the offensive on May 15. Advancing on the main axis of 6th Army, and facing heavy German air attacks, the 411th and 266th, supported by 5th Guards Tank Brigade, after great efforts, reached the Berestovaia River by the afternoon. One rifle regiment of the 411th liberated the village of Okhochae. This represented a further advance of about 15 km, and the overall commander of the offensive, Marshal Semyon Timoshenko, issued orders to commit two tank corps into the penetration on this sector at dawn on the 16th, but this did not take place because those corps were too far behind the front. Early on that day, elements of three German divisions struck the division's right flank as their forces continued to regroup. As part of this regrouping, III Motorized Corps was being concentrated south of the Izium salient facing 9th Army of Southern Front.

On the morning of May 17 the German counter-offensive struck 9th Army, and within hours had advanced 6 – 10 km north on the Barvenkovo axis and 4 – 6 km in the direction of Dolgenkaia. Although Timoshenko was unwilling to acknowledge the potential crisis over the next 48 hours, on May 19 at 1900 hrs. he issued combat order No. 00320, which stated, in part:

"6th Army, consisting of 337, 47, 103, 248 and 411 [Rifle Divisions], 21 and 23 [Tank Corps]... will secretly deploy the army's main forces to the line Bol. Andreevka, Petrovskaia, and, while delivering the main attack from the right flank toward Novo-Dmitrovka, will destroy the enemy Barvenkovo grouping in co-operation with 9 and 57 Armies."

In short, the bulk of 6th Army was to reverse front and advance eastward to defeat the counter-attacking German forces, or at least hold open a corridor to the salient.

During May 23 the German counteroffensive succeeded in encircling the Soviet Barvenkovo grouping and began widening the corridor; 1st Mountain Division was deployed in the center of the cordon to act as a switchline against any attempts to penetrate from either east or west. The following day the 411th, along with the remnants of 23rd Tank Corps, reached the face of the corridor east of Lozovskii, in the Panteleeva Balka region. At 1000 hrs. on May 25 it began its part in the breakout effort, which led to some of the bloodiest fighting in the whole Soviet-German War. By the afternoon of the next day, the Soviet troops who had not managed to escape were pinned in a 16-by-3 km pocket along the Bereka River valley.

The division was trapped and mostly destroyed, along with most of 6th Army, by May 27, although individuals and small groups filtered through the German lines for weeks. Stavka officially disbanded the division on June 30, and it was never reformed.

One of the survivors of the disaster was Colonel Pesochin. He went on to command the 131st Rifle Division from July to September, 1942, and later commanded the 225th Rifle Division for nearly a year, beginning on May 29, 1944. He suffered a severe head wound on February 11, 1945, while leading his division during the Lower Silesian Offensive, and died in hospital on May 3, just as the war was ending.
