= 378th Rifle Division =

- Active: 1941–1945
- Country: Soviet Union
- Branch: Red Army
- Type: Division
- Role: Infantry
- Engagements: Siege of Leningrad; Lyuban Offensive Operation; Operation Polyarnaya Zvezda; Novgorod–Luga Offensive; Battle of Narva; Pskov-Ostrov Offensive; Baltic Offensive; Riga Offensive; Vistula-Oder Offensive
- Decorations: Order of the Red Banner
- Battle honours: Novgorod

Commanders
- Notable commanders: Col. Ivan Petrovich Dorofeev; Maj. Gen. Georgii Pavlovich Lilenkov; Maj. Gen. Ivan Mikhailovich Platov; Maj. Gen. Aleksandr Romanovich Belov

The 378th Rifle Division was an infantry division of the Red Army that began forming in August 1941 in the Siberian Military District, before being sent to the vicinity of Leningrad, where it spent most of the war. The soldiers of this division fought until early 1944 to break the siege and drive off the besieging German forces, distinguishing themselves in the liberation of Novgorod. Finally, the division was redeployed to advance into the Baltic states in 1944 and into East Prussia in the winter of 1945. As the war was ending the 378th was disbanded to provide replacements for other divisions. Nevertheless, it had compiled a very creditable combat record for any rifle division.

== Formation ==
The 378th began forming on August 10, 1941 at Achinsk in the Siberian Military District, based on an RKO order of that date that included the 372nd, 374th and 376th Rifle Divisions. It was destined for the 59th Army in Volkhov Front. Its order of battle was as follows:

- 1254th Rifle Regiment
- 1256th Rifle Regiment
- 1258th Rifle Regiment
- 944th Artillery Regiment
- 318th Antitank Battalion
- 443rd Reconnaissance Company
- 661st Sapper Battalion
- 832nd Signal Battalion (later 832nd Signal Company)
- 466th Medical/Sanitation Battalion
- 459th Chemical Protection (Anti-gas) Company
- 496th Motor Transport Company
- 235th Field Bakery
- 804th Divisional Veterinary Hospital
- 1429th Field Postal Station
- 752nd Field Office of the State Bank

The division's first commander, Col. Ivan Petrovich Dorofeev, was appointed on November 1. The division was given about six weeks to form up before it was sent by rail to the front, arriving at Vologda, east of Leningrad, and was assigned to 59th Army by November 15.

== Battle of Leningrad ==
When the 378th arrived at the front it was hampered from the lack of heavy weapons available to outfit reserve units at this time. At this point, the artillery regiment had only two battalions, instead of three. The 1st battalion had nine 76mm guns in three undersized batteries of three guns each, while the 2nd had just four 122mm howitzers and another four 76mm guns. This was less than half the authorized strength. The regimental mortar units were formed with improvised equipment as well, because in 1942, when the division consolidated these weapons into a divisional battalion, it had one battery of 107mm mountain mortars and one of 120mm mortars, indicating that the division had mountain equipment substituted for at least half the regimental pieces authorized. It also did not receive its antitank battalion until early 1942.

59th Army entered the Lyuban Offensive Operation on January 6, 1942, but the division was in the second echelon in the early stages. These attacks made little progress and collapsed in utter exhaustion and confusion a few days later. Nonplussed by the failures, Stalin dispatched his deputy, Lev Mekhlis, to supervise the Front's preparations to renew the offensive. While Mekhlis' presence was more often a hindrance to Soviet operations, in this case he made at least one positive contribution:

"For example, when he learned that the attacking armies were without artillery and that the available guns lacked vital parts, including optical instruments and communications equipment, Mekhlis informed Stalin. Soon, Gen. N. Voronov, the chief of the Red Army's Artillery, was sent to Malaia Vishera with several railway cars containing the missing equipment."

In this way, some of the 378th's deficiencies were made up. After regrouping the offensive was renewed on January 13, again without much success. In preparation for a further effort to begin on January 27, the division was regrouped to the Dubtsy Station and Sleshchenshoe village sector. While the renewed attack did not achieve all its objectives, over 100,000 men of 2nd Shock Army were able to advance as far as 75 km into the German rear.

Within weeks the German I Corps had turned the tables, and 2nd Shock found itself partially encircled, with just a narrow corridor under enemy fire linking back to Volkhov Front. The 378th, still outside the pocket in 59th Army, was referenced in orders from Leningrad Front on May 2 to be deployed in the Liubino Pole area in Front reserve and to receive replacements. During subsequent operations to widen the corridor the division fought its way into the pocket, only to be cut off itself; it was able to extricate itself on May 16.

Just prior to Operation Pole Star, the 378th was moved to 54th Army, still in Volkhov Front. That army went into the attack on February 10, 1943, in the sector north of Smerdynia and the Tygoda River, aiming at the rail line south of Tosno. The division was one of four launched against the defenses of 96th Infantry Division, backed by three rifle brigades and the 124th Tank Brigade. Despite its superior forces the shock group penetrated only 3 – 4 km along a 5 km front in three days of fighting. The Germans halted the assault by reinforcing its defense with regimental groups from other sectors.

Following this effort, the 378th was shifted to 8th Army in March, to take part in a pincer attack on Mga with 55th Army which began on March 19. After a 135-minute artillery preparation and three days of intense fighting, 8th Army's first echelon divisions, including the 378th, had penetrated 3 - 4 km on a 7 km front, at the junction of the 1st and 223rd Infantry Divisions. At this point a mobile group consisting of the 191st Guards Rifle Regiment from 64th Guards Rifle Division and a battalion of tanks was committed to advance to Mga Station. In ongoing fighting until April 2 this last objective was not reached. Despite this, on April 28 the 378th was singled out for its performance and awarded the Order of the Red Banner.

A further effort began on July 22; in this attack the division was paired with 18th Rifle Division as the first echelon of a shock group deployed north of the Mga-Volkhov rail line, facing the bulk of the German 5th Mountain Division. For six days prior to the assault, 8th Army artillery had pounded the German defenses, and the attackers soon took the forward trenches, but stiff resistance and heavy airstrikes held up further progress. 5th Mountain, however, took extremely heavy losses, and in late July had to be reinforced by 132nd Infantry Division to avert disaster. On August 9 the Soviet forward troops believed they had found a weak place in the German line, defended by the battered mountain troops. On August 11, two rifle divisions and two tank regiments moved to support the 378th and two other divisions already fighting on this sector. While this effort finally took the strongpoint at Porechye, which was evacuated by the Germans on the night of August 14-15, the overall offensive collapsed in utter exhaustion. During the Sixth Sinyavino Offensive in September, the division made a further effort against 5th Mountain but made little progress. The front around Leningrad fell relatively quiet for the next few months.

== Novgorod Offensive ==
Later in September, the 378th was assigned to the 14th Rifle Corps, where it would remain for the remainder of its service. At the same time, it was moved back to 59th Army.

59th Army's offensive on Novgorod began on January 14, 1944, with 14th Corps closest to the objective. Despite a heavy artillery preparation, the assault by 6th Rifle Corps, north of 14th Corps, stalled after advancing only 1 kilometre. Fortunately for 6th Corps, the 1258th Rifle Regiment of the 378th attacked prematurely and without orders, taking advantage of the fact that German troops had abandoned their forward works during the artillery preparation, and seized a portion of those defenses. The 1254th Rifle Regiment then joined the attack and the two regiments overcame the first two German trench lines and gained a small bridgehead over the Pitba River at Malovodskoe. By late on January 16, 59th Army had torn a 20km wide hole in the Germans' main defensive belt. The following day, despite bad weather, difficult terrain and lack of transport, 59th Army was clearly threatening to encircle the German XXXVIII Army Corps at Novgorod. On the night of January 19 these forces got the order to break out along the last remaining route. The city was liberated on the morning of the 20th, and on the next day most of the survivors of the German corps were surrounded and soon destroyed. In recognition of this feat, the 378th Rifle Division was recognized as follows:

"NOVGOROD" - 378 Rifle Division (Colonel Belov, Aleksandr Romanovich); the troops who participated in the battles with the enemy, and the breakthrough and liberation of Novgorod, by the order of the Supreme High Command of 20 January 1944, and a commendation in Moscow, is given a salute of 20 artillery salvos from 224 guns.

As the offensive continued, Volkhov Front was dissolved on February 13, and the division was reassigned to Leningrad Front. It was then near Narva, back in 8th Army, then returned to 59th Army until April, when it was moved to 42nd Army in 3rd Baltic Front. In June, 14th Rifle Corps went into the reserves of 1st Baltic Front, then into 4th Shock Army in 2nd Baltic Front. In the second week of July it was in the vicinity of Sharkovshchina, advancing into the so-called "Baltic Gap". By August it was back in 1st Baltic Front in the same army, and remained under those commands until February, 1945, when the division was briefly assigned to 6th Guards Army. On October 22, 1944, the 1254th and 1258th Rifle Regiments, plus the 944th Artillery Regiment, were awarded the Order of Aleksandr Nevsky for their roles in the liberation of Riga.

== Disbandment ==
Later in February, 14th Rifle Corps went into 2nd Baltic Front reserves, and then to the strategic rear, where the corps was subordinated to the Lithuanian Military District as a garrison. While in garrison, the 378th was officially disbanded on March 13 (Feskov states March 1), in order to rebuild other divisions in the corps, in particular the 90th Guards Rifle Division, which inherited the 378th's Order of the Red Banner and Novgorod honorific.
