= 80th Rifle Division =

- Active: 1st formation: 1923–July 1941; 2nd formation: September 1941–mid-1945
- Country: Soviet Union
- Branch: Red Army
- Type: Infantry
- Size: Division
- Part of: 6th Army (1941)
- Engagements: Operation Barbarossa, Siege of Leningrad
- Decorations: Order of Kutuzov 2nd class (2nd formation)
- Battle honours: Lyuban (2nd formation)

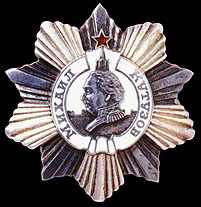
Image of the division’s crest

The 80th Rifle Division (Russian: 80-я стрелковая дивизия) was a rifle division of the Red Army, formed twice.

The division was first formed in 1923 and was stationed in eastern Ukraine. It was destroyed in mid-1941 in the Battle of Uman. Its second formation was formed from a People's Militia division in Leningrad, fighting in the siege of that city from September. In early 1944 it fought in the Leningrad–Novgorod Offensive, which ended the siege. The division then served with the 59th Army in its westward advance, and was disbanded postwar.

== 1st formation ==
The division was established in 1923 in the Ukrainian Military District, initially as a territorial rifle division.

The division's initial composition was:

- 410th Rifle Regiment
- 467th Rifle Regiment
- 519th Rifle Regiment
- 346th Artillery Regiment

It remained a part of the Ukrainian Military District until 1935 when the eastern half of Ukraine was used to create the Kharkiv Military District and the division was assigned to it.

In the summer of 1939 in the Kharkiv MD, the 239th Rifle Regiment was used to form the 141st Rifle Division. The headquarters of the division was used to reform the division to full strength at Mariupol during February 1939.

On 22 June 1941 the division was part of the 37th Rifle Corps of the 6th Army. The division fought in Don Basin and near Kattowits during the defensive battles on the Ukrainian border (22 June 1941 - 27 June 1941), but was destroyed in withdrawal during the Battle of Uman in September 1941.

== 2nd formation ==
Almost immediately the division was reformed in Leningrad from volunteers by redesignating the First Guards Division of People's Militia (Первая гвардейская дивизия народного ополчения) from 23 September 1941 as 80th Rifle Division (2nd formation). Its 1st and 2nd rifle regiments came from the workers of the Leningrad's Neva rayon, and its 3rd rifle and artillery regiments and other sub-units were formed from workers of the Kuybishev rayon.

The division was first committed to combat on the 11th of August west of Volosovo (35 km from Krasnogvardeysk), where it successfully defended its sector for several days until the Army withdrew. From the end of August the division was a part of the Koporsk operational group, and later the 8th Army during the battles for the coastal positions around Leningrad, holding positions around Ropsha and south of Oranienbaum.

As part of the 54th Army of the Volkhov Front the division participated in the Tikhvin Offensive (10 November 1941 - 30 December 1941), and the Leningrad-Novgorod Strategic Offensive Operation (14 January 1944 - 1 March 1944) for which it was awarded the Order of Kutuzov, 2nd Class and the honorific "Lyuban" in honor of its capture of Lyuban.

The division ended its combat service during the German-Soviet War in Czechoslovakia with the 59th Army of the 1st Ukrainian Front. It was disbanded in the northern hemisphere summer of 1945 with the Central Group of Forces.
