= 376th Rifle Division =

- Active: 1941 – 1945
- Country: Soviet Union
- Branch: Red Army
- Type: Division
- Role: Infantry
- Engagements: Battle of Leningrad; Lyuban Offensive Operation; Operation Iskra; Leningrad–Novgorod Offensive; Pskov-Ostrov Offensive; Baltic Offensive; Riga Offensive; Courland Pocket
- Decorations: Order of the Red Banner
- Battle honours: Kuzbass; Pskov

Commanders
- Notable commanders: Lt. Col. Dmitry Ivanovich Ugorich; Col. Georgy Petrovich Isakov; Maj. Gen. Nikolai Antonovich Polyakov

The 376th Rifle Division was raised in 1941 as an infantry division of the Red Army, and served for the duration of the Great Patriotic War in that role. It began forming in August 1941 in the Siberian Military District. It followed a very similar combat path to that of the 374th Rifle Division. It joined the fighting front in December with the new 59th Army along the Volkhov River and it continued to serve in the battles near Leningrad until early 1944. The division took horrendous casualties in the combat to create and hold open a passage to the 2nd Shock Army during the Lyuban Offensive and was itself partly or fully encircled at several times during this dismal fighting. The division finally left this region as it advanced during the Leningrad–Novgorod Offensive in January 1944 and in July won a battle honor in the liberation of Pskov, while its 1250th Rifle Regiment was awarded the Order of the Red Banner. In October the 376th as a whole would also receive the Red Banner for its part in the liberation of Riga. The division ended the war in Latvia, helping to contain and reduce the German forces trapped in the Courland Pocket, and was reorganized as a rifle brigade shortly thereafter.

== Formation ==
Like the 372nd and 374th Rifle Divisions, the 376th began forming on 10 August 1941 in the Siberian Military District based on an RKO order of that date at Kemerovo, Stalinsk, Prokopyevsk and Leninsk-Kuznetsky in the Kuzbass, based on the first wartime shtat (table of organization and equipment) for rifle divisions. Many of its personnel were Kuzbass coal miners, and it was given the name of the region as an honorific when it was formed. Its order of battle was as follows:

- 1248th Rifle Regiment
- 1250th Rifle Regiment
- 1252nd Rifle Regiment
- 943rd Artillery Regiment
- 383rd Antitank Battalion
- 442nd Reconnaissance Company
- 660th Sapper Battalion
- 762nd (later 831st) Signal Battalion (later 524th Signal Company)
- 465th Medical/Sanitation Battalion
- 458th Chemical Protection (Anti-gas) Company
- 495th Motor Transport Company
- 234th Field Bakery
- 803rd Divisional Veterinary Hospital
- 1428th (later 1442nd) Field Postal Station
- 751st Field Office of the State Bank

Lt. Col. Dmitry Ivanovich Ugorich was assigned to command of the division on 1 September, and he would remain in command until 9 April 1942. In November the division was assigned to the 59th Reserve Army, and remained in there when it became the 59th Army. It moved by rail that month as far as Vologda from where it faced a march of about 700 km to reach the fighting front. The division and its Army joined Volkhov Front in December. The division contained a large number of experienced riflemen because when it first went into action it had 375 snipers on strength, five in each rifle platoon on average.

== Lyuban Offensive Operation ==
Volkhov Front launched its main offensive on 6 January 1942. By the end of the day 59th Army's initial assault had expired due to heavy German resistance. Army Gen. K. A. Meretskov reported to the STAVKA the next morning, in part: "After repelling repeated enemy attacks, the 376th and 288th Rifle Divisions are along the Meneksha River line..." Following further bloody failure that day and later, on 10 January the STAVKA called a three-day halt in the attacks at Meretskov's request. After regrouping and forming new shock groups he resumed the offensive on 13 January, this time preceded by heavier and more effective artillery preparations. On 17 January the 2nd Shock Army resumed its attack, supported by more than 1,500 aircraft sorties, and finally penetrated the Germans' first defensive positions on the west bank of the Volkhov, advanced 5 – 10 km and created conditions that Meretskov considered favorable for developing success. Early on 22 January he proposed:

"1. Leave the 4th Army with the 44th, 310th and 190th Rifle Divisions and the 80th Cavalry Division along the Kirishi and Gruzino front and add to it the 59th Army's 288th and 376th Rifle Divisions, which are operating along the western bank of the Volkhov River north of Gruzino. The 4th Army will temporarily conduct local operations to tie down enemy forces."

This plan was approved later that day. The 376th would remain in 4th Army until March.

On 15 March the German 18th Army began its Operation Raubtier with the objective of pinching out the 10 km-wide corridor connecting 2nd Shock Army to the Soviet front along the Volkhov to encircle it and thwart its planned attack on Lyuban. Two days later the STAVKA ordered Meretskov to, among other measures, transfer the 376th to the Miasnoi Bor area to help hold the corridor open. In the event the German forces managed to link up on 20 March, but this success was tenuous at best. Meretskov proposed that four divisions of the 52nd Army, including the 376th which had been transferred there, launch an offensive towards Novgorod on 29 March, which would reopen communications to 2nd Shock and divert enemy forces to the defense of that city. He also noted that each division was understrength by 2,500–3,000 men. Despite these preparations by 26 March, the 18th Army had formed outer and inner encirclement lines around 2nd Shock Army and part of 59th Army and a more direct approach became necessary. An operational group from the two trapped armies began an assault to link up with the stubbornly advancing 52nd Army on 27 March at or near Miasnoi Bor. By the end of the day a gap 3–5 km wide was forced through the enemy cordon, which salvaged the situation for the time being.

In the event the Novgorod operation was never carried out. On 8 April elements of 52nd and 59th Armies struck again, widening the gap to 2nd Shock's positions, although the passage was still inadequate. The 376th was then withdrawn into the Volkhov Front reserves for replenishment, deploying again in the Miasnoi Bor area. On the 9th, Lt. Colonel Ugorich left command of the division, being replaced by Col. Georgy Petrovich Isakov. Volkhov Front was soon disbanded and the division returned to the front in 59th Army, which was now in the Group of Forces Volkhov Direction (later Volkhov Group of Forces) of Leningrad Front. It remained in that Army when Volkhov Front was reformed in June.

=== Operation Spark ===
In September the 376th was transferred to the rebuilding 2nd Shock Army, still in Volkhov Front, being briefly assigned to 6th Guards Rifle Corps. Colonel Isakov handed his command to Maj. Gen. Nikolai Emilianovich Argunov on 29 December; Isakov would go on to be promoted to major general and was made a Hero of the Soviet Union. On 12 January 1943, the Volkhov and Leningrad Fronts launched the third Sinyavino offensive, also called Operation Iskra ("Spark"). Volkhov Front's part in the offensive began at 0930 hours with an artillery preparation with more than 2,000 guns, including 300 conducting direct fire on the forward edge of the German defenses. Soon this was accompanied by attacks from 14th Air Army. The 376th was on the extreme left flank of 2nd Shock, and made a joint attack with elements of 8th Army which penetrated the forward edge of the enemy defense but was halted by heavy fire from the 1st Infantry Division. Repeated attempts to resume the offensive in this sector were stymied by German counterattacks. Overnight on 12/13 January Meretskov reinforced the division's thrust towards Sinyavino with the 71st Rifle Division supported by the 98th Tank Brigade but deteriorating weather and the dense forests hindered coordination and accurate artillery fire. While Sinyavino remained out of reach, to the north at 0930 hours on 18 January the 123rd Rifle Division of 67th Army joined hands with the 372nd of 2nd Shock just east of Workers Settlement No. 1 and the siege of Leningrad was officially broken.

On 27 January General Argunov resumed his post as Deputy Chief of Staff for Combat Training, Volkhov Front, and was replaced in command by Maj. Gen. Mikhail Danilovich Grishin. Following Operation Iskra the 376th moved with its Army into Leningrad Front, where it remained through the rest of 1943. In August it was reassigned to 55th Army.

== Leningrad–Novgorod Offensive ==
In the preparations for the offensive that finally drove the German Army away from Leningrad for good, in December the 376th was reassigned again, now to the 116th Rifle Corps in 67th Army. The initial task assigned to this Army was to tie down the German forces south and east of Leningrad to prevent them from reinforcing their forces facing 2nd Shock and 42nd Armies. Subsequently, the 67th was to attack through Mga and Ulyanovka towards Krasnogvardeisk. The offensive began on 14 January 1944, and on 19 January the latter town was liberated, primarily by 42nd Army. Early on 21 January Soviet intelligence detected a partial German withdrawal from Mga and 67th Army was ordered to pursue and destroy the enemy forces in the region. While the German forces evaded encirclement, Mga was liberated late in the day. On 26 January the 116th Corps was withdrawn into Front reserve, and by the end of the month the division was transferred to the 118th Rifle Corps, also in Front reserve. On 6 February that Corps was reassigned to serve as the second echelon of 42nd Army, and it would remain under that command until July, becoming part of 3rd Baltic Front when that was created in April. On 4 March, General Grishin passed his command over to Maj. Gen. Nikolai Antonovich Polyakov.

== Baltic Offensive ==
At the start of the summer offensive the 376th was directly north of Pskov, near the shores of Lake Pskov, facing the defenses of the Panther Line. After days of intense fighting the line was breached and on 23 July the division was recognized as follows:

"PSKOV... 376th Rifle Division (Maj. Gen. Polyakov, Nikolai Antonovich)... The troops who participated in the liberation of Pskov, by the order of the Supreme High Command of July 23, 1944, and a commendation in Moscow, are given a salute of 20 artillery salvoes from 224 guns.

The 1250th Rifle Regiment was awarded the Order of the Red Banner for its role in the same action.

By 1 August the division was back in the 116th Rifle Corps of 67th Army, but during that month it was reassigned to the 119th Rifle Corps of 1st Shock Army. It would remain under command of that Army for the duration. By the middle of September the 376th was in the vicinity of Ape in Latvia, continuing to advance to the west. On 19 September it took part in the liberation of Valga in Estonia. By early October it was approaching Riga just east of Limbaži. The division played a major role in the liberation of Riga, and was recognized with the award of the Order of the Red Banner on 31 October.

== Battle of Courland ==
After the battle for Riga the 3rd Baltic Front was disbanded and the 1st Shock Army was reassigned to the 2nd Baltic Front. Col. Dmitry Ivanovich Pavlov took command of the division from General Polyakov on 28 December. The 376th remained in 119th Corps until February 1945, when it was reassigned to the 123rd Rifle Corps, still in 1st Shock Army. It would remain under those Corps and Army commands for the duration, moving to the Courland Group of Forces with them in March. On 15 January General Polyakov returned to command and would remain in that position for the duration.

== Postwar ==
The division ended the war with the full title: 376th Rifle, Kuzbass-Pskov, Order of the Red Banner Division (Russian: 376-я стрелковая Кузбасско-Псковская Краснознамённая дивизия). In September 1945 it was reorganized as the 48th Rifle Brigade. In June 1949 the brigade moved from Serdobsk in Penza Oblast to the Turkestan Military District, joining the 119th Rifle Corps. In July 1949 it was raised to divisional status again as the 376th Mountain Rifle Division. In 1950 it was stationed at Osh, but then it was renamed the 71st Mountain Rifle Division in 1955. In February or June 1958 it was reduced into the 427th Independent Motor Rifle Regiment.

In 1960, with the entry into service of the BTR-50, the 427th MRR was reorganized into the 71st Motorized Rifle Division (71st Motor Rifle Division) (cadre).

In 1962, the 71st Motor Rifle Division was reorganized into the 34th Separate Reinforced Motorized Rifle Battalion (34th Motorized Rifle Battalion), which began to cover the state border with the PRC.

In connection with the further aggravation of relations with the PRC, in accordance with the Directive of the Chief of the General Staff of the USSR Armed Forces No. 22831 of 14 December 1965, the 34th Motorized Rifle Battalion was reorganized on 13 May 1966, into the 860th separate motorized rifle Pskov Red Banner Regiment (860th Motorized Rifle Regiment or military unit 77701).

Later it became part of the Central Asian Military District when that was established in 1969. It then was sent to Afghanistan with the 40th Army (Soviet Union). It was stationed at Fayzabad in the late 1980s.

On 21 July 1988, the regiment was withdrawn from the territory of Afghanistan in the city of Termez, where it was given a new code name - military unit 52060. On 28 October 1988, the regiment was disbanded.
