= 288th Rifle Division =

- Active: 1941–1946
- Country: Soviet Union
- Branch: Red Army
- Type: Rifle division
- Engagements: World War II
- Battle honours: Dno

Commanders
- Notable commanders: Ivan Alfyorov

The 288th Rifle Division (Russian: 288-я стрелковая дивизия) was an infantry division of the Soviet Union's Red Army during World War II. Formed in the summer of 1941, the division was sent into combat on the Volkhov Front in the fall of that year. The division served in the area until early 1944 when the siege of Leningrad was ended and the 288th advanced into the Baltic states. The division spent the final months of the war blockading trapped German troops in the Courland Pocket before being disbanded in early 1946.

== History ==
The 288th began forming on 13 July 1941 at Yaroslavl, part of the Moscow Military District, from reservists. Its basic order of battle included the 1012th, 1014th, and 1016th Rifle Regiments, as well as the 834th Artillery Regiment. The division was moved north within a month and in mid-August was assigned to the new 52nd Army, forming east of Leningrad in the swampy Volkhov area. The overstretched division held a front of 46 kilometers in the Volkhov area by mid-October. In early January 1942, the division was transferred to the 4th Army, still in the Volkhov Front. In November 1943 it was transferred to the 54th Army's 111th Rifle Corps. After the end of the siege of Leningrad in January 1944, the division advanced into the Baltic states in the spring and summer.

In August the 288th was transferred to the 1st Shock Army in Latvia and in late October became part of the 42nd Army's 123rd Rifle Corps. From January 1945, the division was part of the 22nd Army's 14th Guards Rifle Corps, blockading German troops trapped in the Courland Pocket on the Baltic coast of Lithuania. In March the 14th Guards Rifle Corps was transferred to the Courland Group of Forces of the 2nd Baltic Front, with which it ended the war in May with the surrender of the German Army Group Courland. The division was disbanded by February 1946 with the 14th Guards Rifle Corps in the Kiev Military District, where it had relocated in August 1945.
