= 59th Army (Soviet Union) =

59th Krakow Army
- 59-я армия
- Active: 1941–1945
- Country: Soviet Union
- Branch: Red Army
- Size: Field army
- Part of: Volkhov Front
- Engagements: World War II: Lyuban offensive operation; Leningrad–Novgorod offensive; Vyborg–Petrozavodsk offensive; Vistula–Oder offensive; Lower Silesian offensive; Upper Silesian offensive; Prague offensive

Commanders
- Notable commanders: Ivan Galanin; Ivan Korovnikov

The 59th Krakow Army (Russian: 59-я армия) was a field army of the Soviet Union's Red Army. It was formed in November 1941 in the Siberian Military District. It was soon redeployed to the Arkhangelsk Military District and by December was part of the Volkhov Front. From January to April 1942, it fought in the Lyuban offensive operation, an unsuccessful attempt to relieve Leningrad. For the next two years, the army defended its bridgehead on the Volkhov River. During spring 1944, it fought in the Leningrad–Novgorod offensive, which broke the siege of Leningrad. During the summer of 1944, the army fought in the Vyborg–Petrozavodsk offensive, helping to end the Continuation War. In December, the army transferred to the Sandomierz bridgehead, from which it launched the Vistula–Oder offensive in January 1945. At the end of January, the army crossed the Oder and then fought in the Lower Silesian offensive and the Upper Silesian offensive. By late March it was in the Sudetes. In May 1945, the army launched the Prague offensive. Postwar, the army headquarters was used to create the Stavropol Military District in July 1945.

== History ==
The 59th Army was formed on 15 November 1941 in the Siberian Military District in accordance with a Stavka order of 2 November. It included the 366th, 372nd, 374th, 376th, 378th and 382nd Rifle Divisions and the 78th and 87th Cavalry Divisions, as well as other smaller units. The army became part of Reserve of the Supreme High Command (Stavka Reserve) upon completion of formation and was transported westward by rail to the Arkhangelsk Military District. In early December, it helped construct the Cherepovets Fortified Area and improved the defensive line on the eastern shore of Lake Beloye and the Sheksna River. The line ran from the mouth of the Sheksna to the village of Myaksa.

On 18 December the army became part of the Volkhov Front, taking up defensive positions on the right bank of the Volkhov River in the area of Vodosye and Yefremove. Between January and April 1942, the army fought in the Lyuban offensive operation, during which it and the 4th and 52nd Armies, joined later by the 2nd Shock Army, attacked as part of the main attack of the front. The army was unable to fulfill its objectives. In January units of the army captured the settlements of Peresvet, Ostrov, and Kiprovo. In February, the army captured a bridgehead on the left bank of the Volkhov. During March and April the 59th Army disrupted German plans to complete the encirclement of the 2nd Shock Army and to prepare a new attack on Leningrad.

On 24 April the army was transferred to the Leningrad Front, and on 9 June returned to the Volkhov Front (second formation). With the Volkhov Front, the army defended the Myasnoy Bor bridgehead on the Volkhov river for eighteen months, and also on the line along the right bank of the Volkhov up to Novogorod and the northeast coast of Lake Ilmen.

During January and February 1944 the forces of the 59th Army participated in the destruction of Army Group North. During the Novogorod–Luga offensive from 14 January to 15 February the army took Novogorod on 20 January and eliminated the encircled uncoordinated German units. Subsequently, the army conducted an offensive in the Luga sector and on 26 January reached the Leningrad-Dno rail line. Operating jointly with the 67th Army of the Leningrad Front it destroyed the German troops in the Luga area.

The army returned to the Leningrad Front when the Volkhov Front was abolished on 15 February 1944, its field headquarters was withdrawn to the front reserve, and its forces transferred to the 8th and 67th Armies. The army received new units: the 6th, 43rd, 109th, 117th, and 122nd Rifle Corps, the 30th Guards Tank Brigade, and other tank, artillery, and support units. In the last ten days of March the army took defensive positions on the east bank of Chudskoye Lake, on a line from Vasknarva to Gdov, and held it until the summer of 1944.

At the beginning of June the army was relocated to the Karelian Isthmus and during the Vyborg offensive (10 to 20 June) elements of the 59th Army, in cooperation with the Baltic Fleet, conducted a landing operation and cleared islands in Vyborg Bay from Finnish troops. From 10 July to 21 September the army defended the islands and the coast of Vyborg Bay, and after Finland left the war, the army guarded the border on the Karelian Isthmus, from the Vuoksi river to the Gulf of Finland.

The army was withdrawn to the Reserve of the Supreme High Command on 2 December, relocated to Poland in the area of Rzeszów, Łańcut, and Żołynia and was assigned to the 1st Ukrainian Front on 20 December. The 13th, 80th, 314th, 92nd, 135th, 286th, and 245th Rifle Divisions were assigned to the army, as well as artillery, engineer and support units.

During the Sandomierz–Silesian offensive from 12 January to 3 February 1945, the army was sent into action on 14 January from the line of the Nida river at the junction of the 5th Guards and 60th Armies in the sector of Skalmierz, and Mostek, south of Soskovets. During the offensive its units, in coordination with the 60th Army, liberated Krakow on 19 January, Auschwitz concentration camp on 27 January, and jointly with the 21st Army took the center of the Dabrowa Coal Basin, Katowice, on 28 January. By the end of January the army reached the Oder, forced a crossing and took a bridgehead on the left bank in the area of Dzelnitsa (south of Kędzierzyn-Koźle).

During February and March the army took part in the Lower Silesian offensive (8 to 24 February) and the Upper Silesian offensive (15 to 31 March). In cooperation with the 21st and 4th Tank Armies its troops surrounded and destroyed the Oppeln group of German troops, numbering five divisions. During the fighting, the 59th Army liberated Kozel on 18 March, Krappitz and Oberglogau on 19 March, more than 200 other settlements. Continuing the offensive, by 20 March the army reached the foothills of the Sudetes on the border of Poland and Czechoslovakia. The army ended the war in the Prague offensive from 6 to 11 May.

== Commanders ==
The army had two commanders during its existence.

- Major General Ivan Galanin (2 November 1941 – 25 April 1942)
- Major General (promoted to Lieutenant General November 1942) Ivan Korovnikov (25 April 1942 – 9 May 1945)
