= Kharkov Military District =

Military district of the Russian Empire and Soviet Union

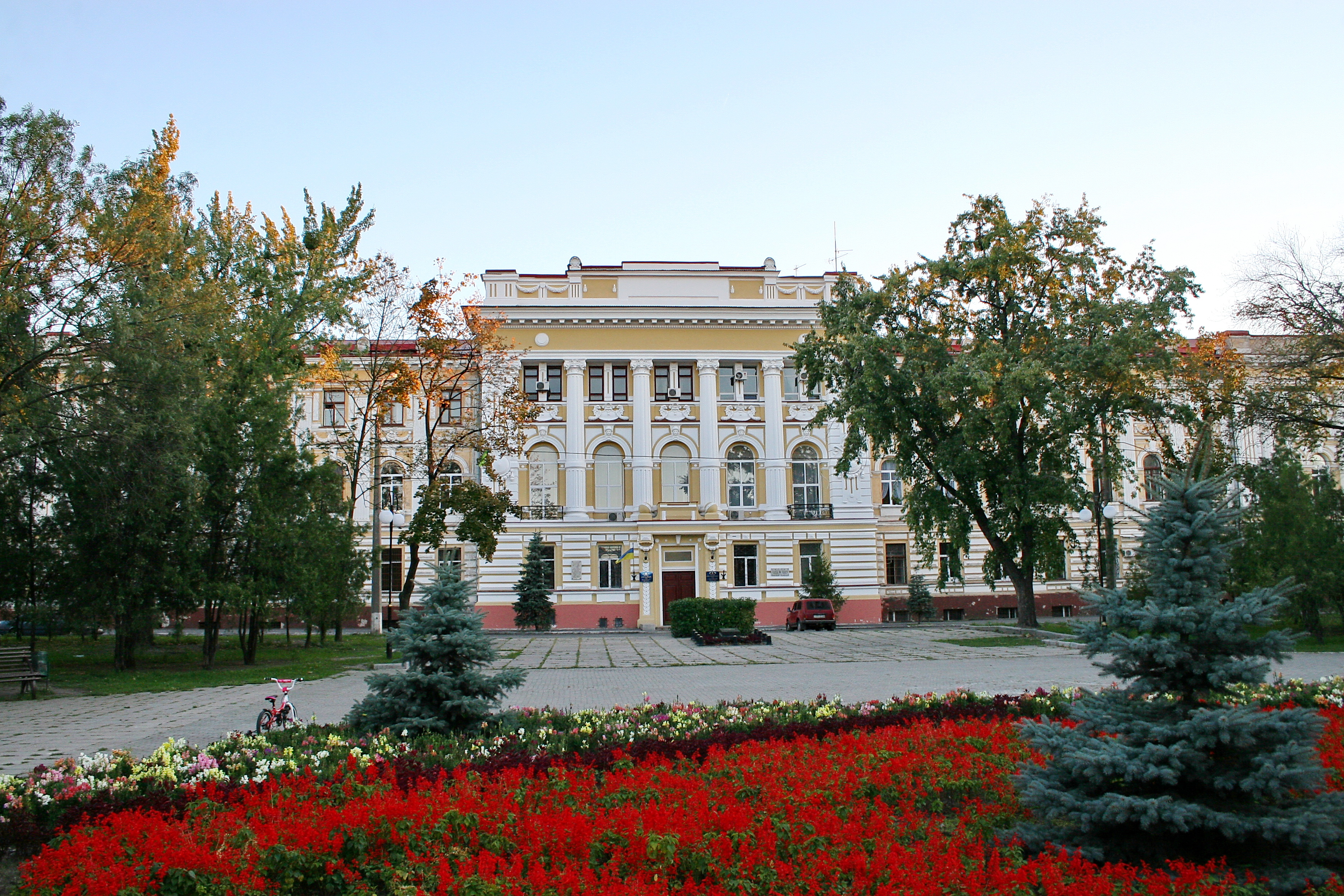
- District headquarters building in Kharkov
- Active: 1864–1888; January–September 1919; January 1920–April 1922; May 1935–November 1941; September 1943–May 1946
- Country: Russian Empire; RFSFR; Soviet Union
- Type: Military district
- Headquarters: Kharkov
- Engagements: Russian Civil War; World War II

Commanders
- Notable commanders: Mikhail Loris-Melikov; Fyodor Radetzky; Robert Eideman; August Kork; Ivan Dubovoy; Semyon Timoshenko; Yakov Cherevichenko; Ivan Tyulenev

The Kharkov Military District (Russian: Харьковский военный округ (ХВО), romanized: Khar'kovskiy voyennyy okrug (KhVO)) was a military district of the Russian Empire, the Russian Soviet Federative Socialist Republic, and the Soviet Union. Throughout its history, the district headquarters was located in the city of Kharkov in northeastern Ukraine.

First established in 1864 in the Russian Empire as part of reforms of the military administrative system, the district was disbanded and its territory transferred to the Kiev Military District and the Moscow Military District in 1888. The district was reestablished by the Red Army during the Russian Civil War in January 1919, but disbanded in September after its territory was taken over by White troops. It was reestablished in January 1920 after its territory was recaptured by the Red Army, but was disbanded in 1922 and its troops subordinated to the Southwestern Military District, which soon became the Ukrainian Military District.

In 1935, the district was reestablished when the Ukrainian Military District was split into the Kiev and Kharkov Military Districts. On 22 June 1941, Operation Barbarossa, the German invasion of the Soviet Union in World War II, began. A series of German victories resulted in the Soviet retreat from the district's territory, and it was disbanded in late November. After Soviet troops recaptured the region in the Battle of the Dnieper, the Kharkov Military District was reestablished in late September 1943. After the end of the war it was downgraded to a territorial military district in February 1946 and disbanded several months later, with its territory being transferred to the Kiev Military District.

== Russian Empire ==
The Kharkov Military District was first established on 22 August [O.S. 10 August] 1864 as part of Dmitry Milyutin's reform of the military administrative system. Its headquarters was in Kharkov, and it controlled troops on the territory of Voronezh, Kursk, Oryol, Poltava, Kharkov, and Chernigov Governorates. The district was abolished on 31 October 1888, with most of its territory being transferred to the Kiev Military District, excluding Voronezh and Oryol Governorates, which became part of the Moscow Military District.

=== Commanders ===
The following Imperial Russian Army officers commanded the district in the Russian Empire period between 1864 and 1888:

- General of Cavalry Vasily Launits (August–October 1864)
- General of Cavalry Sigizmund Merkhilevich (October 1864–February 1865)
- General of Cavalry Pontus Brevern-de la Gardie (February 1865–August 1869)
- General of Infantry Alexander Kartsov (August 1869–November 1875)
- Lieutenant General Felix Sumarokov-Elston (December 1875–October 1877)
- General of Infantry Alexander Minckwitz (October 1877–April 1879)
- General of Cavalry Mikhail Loris-Melikov (April 1879–January 1880)
- General of Cavalry Alexander Dondukov-Korsakov (February 1880–January 1881)
- General of Infantry Dmitry Sviatopolk-Mirsky (January 1881–May 1882)
- General of Infantry Fyodor Radetzky (May 1882–October 1888)

== Russian Civil War ==
The Kharkov Military District was established for a second time by Order No. 39 of the military department of the Provisional Workers' and Peasants' Government of Ukraine, dated 27 January 1919. It controlled troops on the territory of Yekaterinoslav, Poltava, Kharkov, and Chernigov Governorates. The headquarters of the All-Ukrainian General Staff was used to form the district military commissariat (headquarters), and it was subordinated to the Revolutionary Military Council of the Southern Front on 8 June. The district was tasked with training reserve units for the front. On 10 May, in order to suppress to the uprising of Nykyfor Hryhoriv's Red Army troops, Kliment Voroshilov took temporary command of the district's troops until 25 May, when the uprising was defeated. In June the district's territory was taken over by the White Armed Forces of South Russia, and the advance of the Volunteer Army on Kharkov forced the headquarters to flee the city before it was captured. Retreating in the face of the White advance, the district military commissariat was successively located in Sumy, Romny, and Bryansk. On 1 September it moved to Moscow, and was disbanded on 16 September.

After the White retreat from its territory, the district was reestablished by Order No. 118/23 of the Revolutionary Military Council dated 23 January 1920, controlling troops on the territory of Yekaterinoslav, Donets, Poltava, Taurida, and Kharkov Governorates. The military commissariat of the disbanded Yaroslavl Military District was used to man the new district military commissariat, and it was subordinated to the Revolutionary Military Council of the Southwestern Front. On 23 February, the staff of the Ukrainian Reserve Army was merged with the district headquarters, and the latter's commander became commander of the district military commissariat. The district was transferred to the control of the commander of the Armed Forces of Ukraine and Crimea, Mikhail Frunze, on 3 December, after the defeat of the last White troops in Crimea. Nikolayev Governorate and Odessa Governorate became part of the district in May 1921. The troops of the district fought Ukrainian anti-Soviet partisans during this period, and on 21 April 1922 it was merged with the Kiev Military District to form the Southwestern Military District, which soon became the Ukrainian Military District.

=== Commanders ===
The following commanders led the district military commissariat between 1919 and 1920:

- Sergey Kozyura (February–June 1919)
- A.I. Kashkarov (June–August 1919)
- Alexander Surik (August–September 1919)
- Vitaly Sharapov (February–July 1920)
- Ivan Shelykhmanov (July–September 1920)
- Georgy Bazilevich (September–October 1920)

The following commanders led the district between 1920 and 1922:

- Fyodor Orlov (January–February 1921)
- Robert Eideman (March–June 1921)
- August Kork (June 1921–April 1922)

== Second formation (1935–1941) ==
The district was reestablished by Order No. 079 of the People's Commissariat of Defense (NKO), dated 17 May 1935, which split the Ukrainian Military District into the Kiev and Kharkov Military Districts. It initially included Dnipropetrovsk, Donetsk, and Kharkov Oblasts, as well as the Crimean Autonomous Soviet Socialist Republic (ASSR). On 21 August 1937, district commander Komandarm 2nd rank Ivan Dubovoy was arrested during the Great Purge. In October 1939, when the Odessa Military District was created, the Crimean ASSR and Dnipropetrovsk Oblast transferred to the new district, and the district boundaries changed to include only Voroshilovgrad, Poltava, Stalino (formerly Donetsk), Sumy, Kharkov, and Chernigov Oblasts. That year, the district began rearming and reorganizing its units, but the process was not fully completed when Operation Barbarossa, the German invasion of the Soviet Union in World War II, began on 22 June 1941.

Lieutenant General Andrey Smirnov took command of the district on 18 December 1940. After the invasion, the Kharkov Military District mobilized conscripts and formed new units, including the 18th Army, formed from parts of the district headquarters under Smirnov's command. The 18th Army was sent to the Southern Front on 25 June. In October, as German troops approached Kharkov after a series of victories, the district headquarters moved to Voroshilovgrad and then Stalingrad. It was disbanded on 26 November 1941, with its headquarters used to form the Stalingrad Military District.

=== Commanders ===
The following officers commanded the district between 1935 and 1941:

- Komandarm 2nd rank Ivan Dubovoy (July 1935–August 1937)
- Komandarm 2nd rank Semyon Timoshenko (September 1937–February 1938)
- Komdiv Filipp Yershakov (February–April 1938)
- Komkor Ilya Smirnov (April 1938–May 1940)
- Lieutenant General Mikhail Kovalyov (May–December 1940)
- Lieutenant General Andrey Smirnov (18 December 1940 –July 1941)
- Major General Alexander Chernikov (July–October 1941; acting)
- Lieutenant General Vasily Kuznetsov (October–November 1941)
- Major General Nikolay Feklenko (November 1941; acting)

== Third formation (1943–1946) ==
The district was reformed by an NKO order dated 25 September 1943, following the recapture of its territory in the Battle of the Dnieper and the Donbass Strategic Offensive. It included Voroshilovgrad, Dnipropetrovsk, Zaporizhia, Poltava, Stalino, Sumy, Kharkov, and Chernigov Oblasts, as well as the Crimean ASSR. Chernigov Oblast was only briefly part of the district, being transferred to the reestablished Kiev Military District on 15 October. The district was tasked with forming new units and preparing march units to reinforce the front. Its engineer units were involved in demining and the cleanup of unexploded ordnance. On 18 December 1944, the Crimean ASSR was transferred to the reestablished Odessa Military District.

By an NKO order of 9 July 1945, after the end of the war, the district was shifted to peacetime strength. The former district headquarters and the 21st Army headquarters were merged to form a new headquarters for the district. By the same order, Sumy and Poltava Oblasts were transferred to the Kiev Military District, and Zaporizhia Oblast to the Taurida Military District. During the next several months the district demobilized troops on its territory. In August, the 14th Guards Rifle Corps arrived in Dnipropetrovsk from Vyborg, with the 11th and 288th Rifle Divisions. The 44th Rifle Division at Pavlograd joined the corps in November. The corps' three divisions disbanded by February 1946, and were replaced by the 86th, 321st, and the 326th Rifle Divisions from the 116th Rifle Corps. The 69th Rifle Corps was also withdrawn to the Lugansk area, and disbanded on 6 May with the 110th, 163rd, and the 324th Rifle Divisions. On 5 February the district was reorganized as a territorial military district and subordinated to the Kiev Military District, before being disbanded on 6 May. Its troops joined the Kiev Military District.

=== Commanders ===
The following officers commanded the district between 1943 and 1946:

- Colonel General Yakov Cherevichenko (September–December 1943)
- Lieutenant General Vasily Gerasimenko (December 1943–March 1944)
- Lieutenant General Stepan Kalinin (May–June 1944)
- Major General (promoted to Lieutenant General 2 November 1944) Pavel Kurbatkin (June 1944–July 1945)
- Army General Ivan Tyulenev (July 1945–March 1946)
- Lieutenant General Filipp Parusinov (March–May 1946; acting)

== See also ==
- Operational Command East
