= Panther–Wotan line =

German defense line in WWII between Germany and the USSR

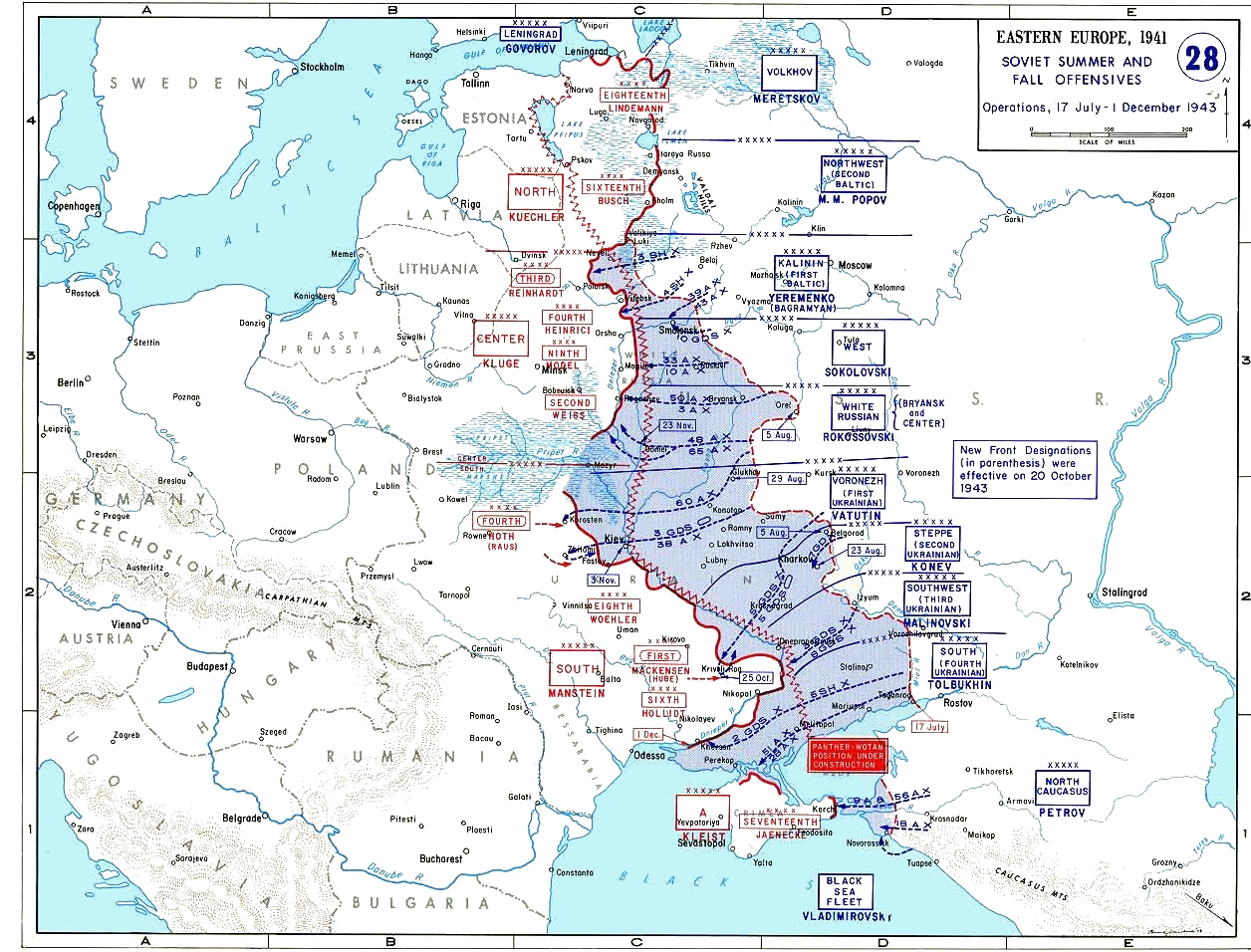
Map of the Eastern Front in 1943: the Panther–Wotan line is shown as the jagged red line.

The Panther–Wotan line (German: Panther-Stellung), also known as the Ostwall ("Eastern Wall"), was a defensive line of the Wehrmacht on the Eastern Front of World War II from 1943 to 1944. The Panther–Wotan line ran from the Baltic Sea at Narva in the north, across the western Soviet Union, then along the Dnieper to the Black Sea. It was only partially built by the time the Red Army broke through the line in mid-1944.

== Planning ==
In 1942, the Wehrmacht suffered a number of setbacks on the Eastern Front, causing its leadership to consider the establishment of defense lines. In early 1943, the German General Staff began to petition for the construction of fortifications and defenses-in-depth along the Dnieper river. Adolf Hitler rejected the establishment of defense lines proposed by Erich von Manstein, mainly for political reasons. Hitler also argued that the mere existence of such a developed defensive line would tempt soldiers to retreat from the actual front line. In August 1943, after the Battle of Kursk, Hitler finally ordered the construction of the defensive lines; with this command, he demonstrated that he had accepted the fact that the Wehrmacht was no longer capable of offensive operations in the east. The need arose to both conserve forces in the Eastern Front as well as shift to defensive operations against the Red Army's counteroffensives.

== Course ==
The Panther–Wotan Line ran in a north–south direction, stretching from Narva at the Baltic Sea in the north to the Sea of Azov in the south. The line ran along the Narva River and the western shore of Lake Peipus, followed the course of the Velikaya River, and then ran overland to Vitebsk, Mogilev, Gomel, and Kiev. From Kiev, a large portion of the line ran along the Dnieper. In the south, where the Dnieper curved (western Dnipropetrovsk Oblast) to the west, it was decided to construct the line east of the Dnieper in order to avoid the evacuation or isolation of the Crimea. The point north of the Zaporozhe bridgehead where the line crossed the Dnieper was the dividing line between the Panther and Wotan Lines. The Panther Line was north of the bridgehead and ran along the west side of the Dnieper, while the Wotan Line was east of the Dnieper and ran south to Melitopol and the Sea of Azov.

On 11 August 1943, when the order was signed for its construction, the Wehrmacht held positions sometimes hundreds of kilometers to the east of the proposed defensive line, generally along the Donets River in the south, and along a line roughly from Smolensk to Leningrad in the north.

== Defensive operations ==
On 8 September 1943, construction of the Panther–Wotan line began, utilising tens of thousands of civilian workers to build bunkers, barbed wire, and anti-tank trenches.

The confidence in the effectiveness of the line was poor in Army Group North, with its commander, General Georg von Küchler, refusing to refer to the line by the "Panther Line" name for fear that it would instill false hope by his troops in its strength. Construction had barely started when Manstein's Army Group South commenced to fall back on it as part of a general withdrawal ordered on 15 September 1943.

The Red Army immediately attempted to break the line to deny the OKH time to plan a long-term defence. It launched the Lower Dnieper strategic offensive operation along a 300 km front. The Wotan Line segment was particularly strong, comprising several lines of trenches with strongpoints, minefields, and barbed wire. The Soviet Southern Front had hoped to bounce the Molochnaya River during the pursuit, but the defenses brought them to an abrupt halt. A deliberate assault was required to penetrate the Wotan Line and the German Seventeenth Army in the Crimea was not cut off until 1 November. The Red Army casualties were 173,201 unrecoverable and 581,191 sick and wounded (total 754,392) in the 2nd, 3rd, and 4th Ukrainian Fronts over the period 26 September–20 December 1943. (Those fronts had previously been named the Steppe, South-Western, and Southern Fronts, respectively.)

The fighting afterward involved the gradual establishment of multiple Soviet bridgeheads across the Dnieper. While the crossing operations of the Dnieper were difficult, the Wehrmacht was unable to dislodge the Red Army from its positions once across the river. The bridgeheads and the Soviet forces deployed in them grew. By late December 1943, Kiev had been taken by the Red Army and broke the line along the Dnieper, forcing a Wehrmacht retreat toward the 1939 Polish border.

The only part of the line to remain in Wehrmacht possession after 1943 was the extreme northern section, the Panther line between Lake Peipus and the Baltic Sea at Narva. The small portion of the line was assaulted during the Battle of Narva, with the Baltic States and the Gulf of Finland remaining in German hands well into 1944.

The defensive positions along the Dnieper were able to slow but not to stop the Soviet advance. The river was a considerable barrier, but the length of the line made it difficult to defend. The inability of the Germans to roll back the Soviet bridgeheads after they were established meant that the line could not be held.

== See also ==
- Battle of Smolensk (1943)
