= 1st Shock Army =

- Active: 1941–1945
- Country: USSR
- Allegiance: Soviet Union
- Branch: Regular Army
- Type: Shock troops
- Size: Varied in the Years
- Part of: Military District
- Engagements: Tartu Offensive; Battle of Moscow; Leningrad–Novgorod Offensive; Riga Offensive; Courland Encirclement

The 1st Shock Army (Russian: 1-я ударная армия) was a field army established by the Soviet Union's Red Army during World War II. The 1st Shock Army was created in late 1941 and fought in the northern areas of Russia and the Baltic States until the surrender of Germany in 1945. The Army was created in accordance with prewar doctrine that called for Shock Armies to 'overcome difficult defensive dispositions in order to create a tactical penetration of sufficient breadth and depth to permit the commitment of mobile formations for deeper exploitation.' However, as the war went on, Shock Armies lost this specific role and reverted, in general, to ordinary frontline formations.

== History ==
The 1st Shock Army was formed as part of the Reserve of the Supreme High Command (RVGK, the Stavka reserve) at Zagorsk (now Sergiyev Posad) in the Moscow Military District in November 1941. Taking part in the Battle of Moscow in December 1941, on 1 December the Army consisted of the 133rd Rifle Division, 29th, 44th, 47th, 50th, 55th, 56th, 71st, and 84th Rifle Brigades, 17th Cavalry Division, two tank battalions, an artillery regiment of the Stavka reserve, and other support units. All the rifle brigades were formed from the naval personnel of the Pacific Fleet.

1st Shock Army was then airlifted to Staraya Russa and fought at Demyansk in 1942. Fighting in the north-central areas of the front, the 1st Shock Army again fought near Staraya Russa in 1944. From 1942 through 1944, the army took part in many attacks such as the Leningrad–Novgorod, Pskov-Ostrov, Tartu, and Riga offensives. Fighting through the Baltic States, the 1st Shock Army finished the war as part of the Courland Group of Forces that had trapped the German Army Group Kurland in the northern reaches of Latvia.

In January 1945, the 1st Shock Army comprised the 112th Rifle Corps (44th, 98th Rifle Divisions), 119th Rifle Corps (53rd Guards, 374th, 376th Rifle Divisions), the 377th Rifle Division, and the 118th and 155th Fortified Regions.

108th, 7th, 119th, and 123rd Rifle Corps all fought the Germans around Staroselye in April. This offensive was part of maintaining pressure on the Courland Pocket.

In May 1945, the 1st Shock Army commanded four Rifle Corps: the 1st (306th, 344th, and 357th Rifle Divisions), 8th Estonian (7th and 249th Estonian Rifle Divisions), 119th (201st, 360th and 374th Rifle Divisions), and 123rd (21st Guards and 376th Rifle Divisions), totaling ten rifle divisions. The 1st Shock Army had by that point been strongly reinforced with three artillery divisions, a corps artillery brigade, a tank brigade, and seven regiments of tanks and assault guns.

1st Shock Army was disbanded by being redesignated Headquarters Turkestan Military District on 9 July 1945.

== Second World War commanders ==
- Nov 1941 to May 1942: Lieutenant General V. I. Kuznetsov
- May 1942 to Nov 1942: Lieutenant General Vladimir Zakharovich Romanovsky
- Nov 1942 to Feb 1943: Lieutenant General Vasili Morozov
- Feb 1943 to Apr 1944: Lieutenant General Gennady Korotkov
- Apr 1944 to May 1944: Colonel General N. E. Chibisov
- May 1944 to Jan 1945: Lieutenant General Nikanor Zakhvatayev
- Feb 1945 to May 1945: Lieutenant General Vladimir N. Razuvaev
