= 374th Rifle Division =

374th Rifle Division (10 August 1941 – 1946)
- Active: 1941 - 1946
- Country: Soviet Union
- Branch: Red Army
- Type: Division
- Role: Infantry
- Engagements: Battle of Leningrad; Lyuban Offensive Operation; Operation Polyarnaya Zvezda; Leningrad–Novgorod Offensive; Battle of Narva (1944); Baltic Offensive; Riga Offensive; Courland Pocket
- Battle honours: Lyuban

Commanders
- Notable commanders: Col. Aleksei Dmitrievich Vitoshkin; Col. Dmitrii Ivanovich Barabanshchikov; Col. Stefan Vladimirovich Kolomiets; Col. Viktor Yakovlevich Popov; Col. Aleksandr Aleksandrovich Volkov; Col. Boris Alekseevich Gorodetskii; Col. Dmitrii Ivanovich Pavlov

The 374th Rifle Division was raised in 1941 as an infantry division of the Red Army, and served for the duration of the Great Patriotic War in that role. It began forming in August 1941 in the Siberian Military District. It joined the fighting front in December with the new 59th Army along the Volkhov River and it continued to serve in the fighting near Leningrad until early 1944. The dismal fighting on this front gave little opportunity for a unit to distinguish itself, and the division did not finally earn a battle honor until late January 1944, during the Leningrad–Novgorod Offensive. It continued to serve in the summer and autumn offensive through the Baltic States, becoming so reduced in strength that its remaining infantry was consolidated into a single understrength regiment which nevertheless won a battle honor in the liberation of Riga. The 374th ended the war in Latvia, helping to contain and reduce the German forces trapped in the Courland Pocket, and was disbanded shortly thereafter.

== Formation ==
Like the 372nd Rifle Division, the 374th began forming on 10 August 1941 in the Siberian Military District based on an RKO order of that date at Bogotol, Ilansky and Nazarovo, in the Krasnoyarsk Krai, based on the first wartime shtat (table of organization and equipment) for rifle divisions. Its order of battle was as follows:

- 1242nd Rifle Regiment
- 1244th Rifle Regiment
- 1246th Rifle Regiment
- 942nd Artillery Regiment
- 382nd Antitank Battalion (from late June 1942)
- 441st Reconnaissance Company
- 659th Sapper Battalion
- 830th Signal Battalion (later 490th Signal Company)
- 464th Medical/Sanitation Battalion
- 457th Chemical Protection (Anti-gas) Company
- 494th Motor Transport Company
- 233rd Field Bakery
- 802nd Divisional Veterinary Hospital
- 1427th (later 1442nd) Field Postal Station
- 750th Field Office of the State Bank

Col. Aleksei Dmitrievich Vitoshkin was not assigned to command of the division until 18 September, and he would remain in command until 4 July 1942. In November the division was assigned to the 59th Reserve Army, and remained in there when it became the 59th Army. It moved by rail that month as far as Vologda from where it faced a march of about 700 km to reach the fighting front. The division and its Army joined Volkhov Front in December.

=== Lyuban Offensive Operation ===
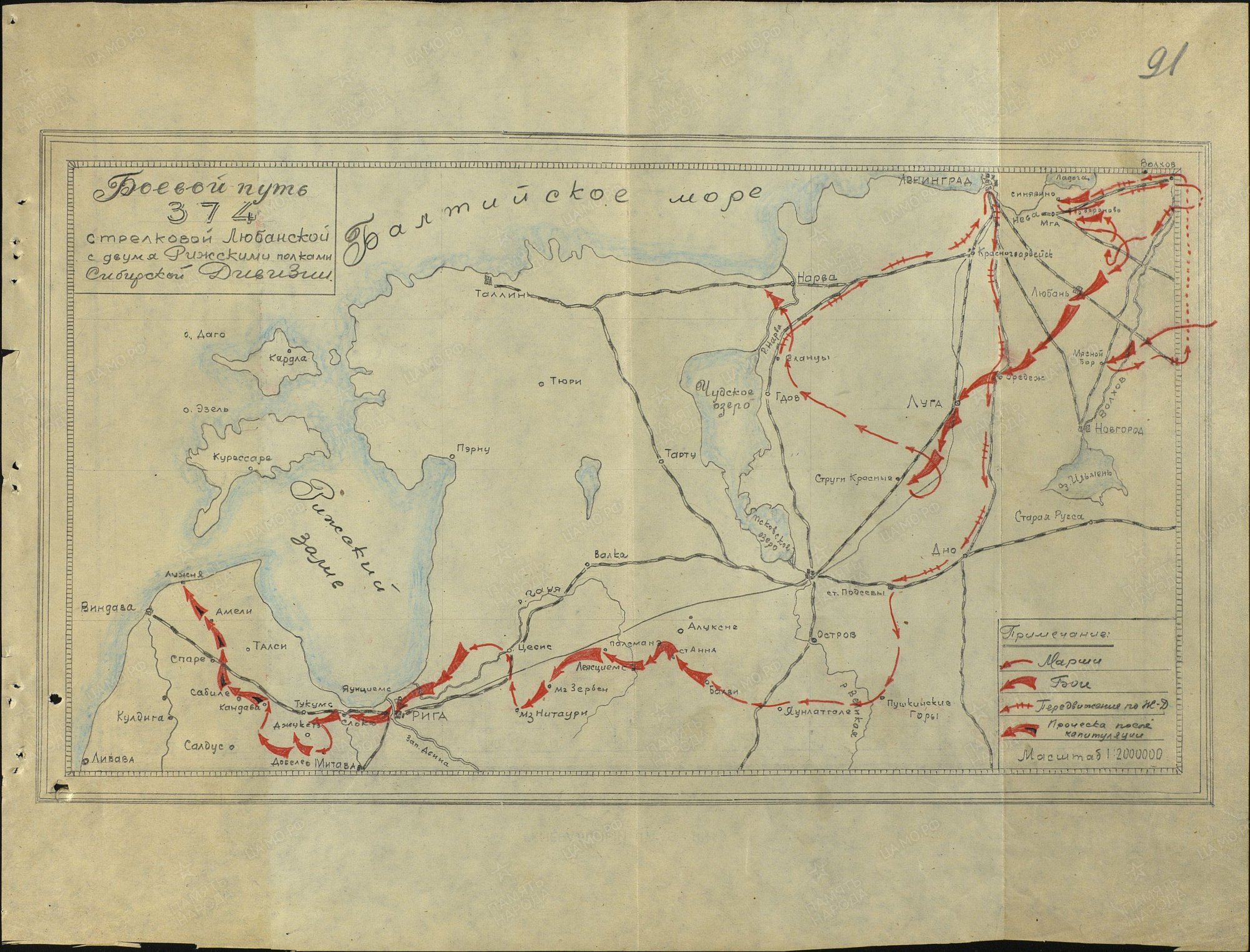
The combat path of the 374th Rifle Division

On 6 January 1942, the Front began an offensive to break through the positions of German 18th Army on the west bank of the Volkhov, primarily with the 2nd Shock Army, and break the siege of Leningrad from the south. The operation got off to a slow start, and it was not until the night of 23/24 January that the Front commander, Army Gen. K. A. Meretskov, could convince himself that 2nd Shock had created enough of a breach to commit his exploitation force. However, the situation soon reverted to stalemate, which Meretskov hoped to break on 28 January in part by clearing the enemy from the western bank of the Volkhov to the Polist River line with the 53rd Rifle Brigade and one rifle regiment of the 374th.

By 26 March German forces had completed inner and outer encirclement lines along the Glushitsa and Polist Rivers and 2nd Shock Army, along with several formations of 59th Army were trapped. Early the next day Meretskov launched a desperate new assault which managed to carve out a tenuous gap 3 - 5 km wide near the village of Miasnoi Bor. This was by no means adequate, and in early April, 59th Army, including the 374th, attacked in the area southwest of Spasskaia Polist, but gained little ground at the cost of heavy losses. As of 1 May the division was with its Army in Leningrad Front as part of the Group of Forces of the Volkhov Direction, which a month later had become the Volkhov Group of Forces. By 1 July the 59th Army was back in Volkhov Front. Col. Yakov Stepanovich Yermakov took command of the division from Colonel Vitoshkin on 5 July, but he was in turn succeeded five days later by Col. Dimitrii Ivanovich Barabanshchikov.

== Sinyavino and Mga Offensives ==
In August the 374th was transferred to the rebuilding 2nd Shock Army, still in Volkhov Front, but saw little action in the Sinyavino Offensive taking place at that time. In early October it was briefly part of the 4th Guards Rifle Corps of that Army, before being removed to the Reserve of the Supreme High Command for a much-needed rebuilding. On 1 November Colonel Barabanshchikov was succeeded in command by Col. Stefan Vladimirovich Kolomiets. The division was assigned to the 3rd Reserve Army, and did not return to Volkhov Front until January 1943, when it was assigned to Front reserves, before being reassigned to the 54th Army in February.

During March the 374th was transferred again, now to the 8th Army where it would remain for the rest of the year. The STAVKA was planning an ambitious offensive, Operation Polyarnaya Zvezda, but this was stymied in the south by the German reserves gained by their evacuation of the Demyansk Pocket. The northern component of the offensive, directed at the enemy communication hub of Mga, was ordered to proceed on 19 March. After a 135-minute artillery preparation and three days of intense fighting, 8th Army's first echelon divisions, including the 374th, had penetrated 3 - 4 km on a 7 km front at the junction of the 1st and 223rd Infantry Divisions. At this point a mobile group consisting of the 191st Guards Rifle Regiment from 64th Guards Rifle Division and a battalion of tanks was committed to advance to Mga Station. In ongoing fighting until 2 April this last objective was not reached.

On 14 July, after a three-day gap, Colonel Kolomiets was replaced in command by Col. Vasilii Konstantinovich Semibratov, but a few weeks later Col. Viktor Yakovlevich Popov was given command. The fifth Sinyavino Offensive began on 22 July with 8th Army again attacking east of Mga, this time on an attack front of 13.6 km in the Voronovo region and aiming to link up with 67th Army at or near Mga while detaching two rifle divisions and a tank brigade to strike at Sinyavino from the south. In order to penetrate the strong German defenses the Army commander, Lt. Gen. F. N. Starikov, organized his forces into two shock groups, each of two echelons. The 374th was in the second echelon of the second group, along with the 165th Rifle Division and 122nd Tank Brigade ready to exploit the offensive, which was preceded by six days of artillery fire on the enemy positions, which were held by 5th Mountain Division. Despite the careful preparations the attack stalled after capturing the forward German trenches. Late in the month Starikov released the 165th and 379th Rifle Divisions from second echelon but this did not improve the situation as German reserves were arriving just as 5th Mountain was falling apart.

On 9 August Soviet reconnaissance detected what they thought was a weak point in the German defenses around a small bridgehead on the east bank of the Naziia River, held by the much-weakened 5th Mountain. Early on 11 August Starikov committed the 374th and 256th Rifle Divisions with two Guards tank regiments in support of the divisions already fighting in the area. Although the reinforced shock group almost enveloped the defending Germans and the 256th finally took the Poreche strongpoint, the attack once again stalled. Repeated attacks and counterattacks severely wore down both the attacking and defending forces. A German source states that the 374th had committed two rifle regiments to the battle and that by 16, 12 to 14 August Red Army infantry battalions were reported as "decimated". At 1440 hours on 22 August the STAVKA finally permitted the Leningrad and Volkhov Fronts to go over to the defensive. The sixth and final Sinyavino Offensive began on 15 September. This time the 67th Army's 30th Guards Rifle Corps finally seized the Sinyavino Heights, but the supporting attacks by 8th Army achieved very little during three days of heavy fighting. The 374th was not part of the Army's shock groups in this attack. Following this battle the fighting south of Leningrad abated for the rest of the year. On 25 October Colonel Popov handed his command to Col. Aleksandr Aleksandrovich Volkov. In December the division became part of the 119th Rifle Corps, still in 8th Army.

== Leningrad-Novgorod Offensive ==
The offensive that finally drove Army Group North from the Leningrad region began on 14 January 1944. During the first stages the forces of Volkhov Front found the going extremely tough and 8th Army in particular, with only about 13,000 troops, made almost no progress at all. Meanwhile 54th Army on the left flank had only managed to advance 3 - 5 km by 20 January. However, that night the German XXVIII Army Corps began to withdraw, and over the next four days the 54th's right flank advanced 20 km towards Lyuban, but encountered heavier resistance as it approached the Rollbahn Line. In response the 119th Corps was reinforced and transferred to 54th Army, and the reinforced Army reached the railroad southeast of Lyuban by the morning of 26 January. The Spanish Blue Legion was sent back to Luga and the 121st Infantry Division was ordered to abandon Lyuban. On 28 January the division was honored for this victory:

"LYUBAN"... 374th Rifle Division (Colonel Boris Alekseevich Gorodetskii)... The troops who participated in the liberation of Tosno and Lyuban, by the order of the Supreme High Command of January 28, 1944, and a commendation in Moscow, are given a salute of 12 artillery salvoes from 124 guns.

By 1 February the 119th Corps was moved to Front reserves and the 374th was transferred to the 115th Rifle Corps, still in 54th Army. The Corps advanced 75 km in nine days and liberated Oredezh on 8 February with attacks from the north and west. This helped to lead to the liberation of Luga on the 12th; on the following day Volkhov Front was disbanded and the 54th Army was moved to Leningrad Front. As the pursuit continued the Corps was briefly under command of 67th Army before being withdrawn to Front reserve on 24 February. A few days later 8th Army took Strugi Krasnye, and the 115th Corps was shifted to that Army.

8th Army was soon deflected northwestward to take part in the complex fighting around the city of Narva. On 25 March Colonel Volkov transferred his command to Col. Boris Alekseevich Gorodetskii. Until July the division would be shuffled between the 8th and 59th Armies in Leningrad Front, as well as several rifle corps.

== Baltic Offensive ==
By the beginning of July the 374th was in the 124th Rifle Corps of 8th Army. By the middle of the month the division was in the vicinity of Porkhov, from where it advanced to the south and then west, bypassing the remaining German defenses in the Ostrov - Pskov area and entering the so-called "Baltic Gap". As of 1 August it was back in 54th Army as part of 7th Rifle Corps, all of which was in 3rd Baltic Front, and had reached the area of Abrene on the border with Latvia. Over the next six weeks the rate of advance slowed considerably and by mid-September the 54th had only reached as far as Gulbene.

At the start of the Riga Offensive the 374th was in the vicinity of Sigulda. By this time it was reduced to a total of just 1,800 officers and men. In order to retain at least some combat effectiveness all the remaining infantry was assigned to the 1244th Rifle Regiment, bringing it to about 60 percent of authorized strength. Despite this the division played a leading role in the liberation of Riga and was recognized:

"RIGA"... 1244th Rifle Regiment (Lieutenant Colonel Fyodor Ivanovich Tsarev)... 942nd Artillery Regiment (Major Aleksandr Tarasovich Posesor)... The troops who participated in the liberation of Riga, by the order of the Supreme High Command of October 13, 1944, and a commendation in Moscow, are given a salute of 24 artillery salvoes from 324 guns.

== Battle of Courland ==
After the battle for Riga the 3rd Baltic Front was disbanded and 54th Army was removed to the Reserve of the Supreme High Command, so the 374th was assigned to the 1st Shock Army in 2nd Baltic Front, where it returned to the 119th Rifle Corps. It would remain under those Corps and Army commands for the duration, moving to the Courland Group of Forces with them in March 1945. On 15 January Col. Dmitrii Ivanovich Pavlov took command from Colonel Gorodetskii and would hold it for the duration. The division's men and women ended the war as the 374th Rifle, Lyuban Division (Russian: 374-я стрелковая Любанская дивизия).

== Postwar ==
With its corps and army, the 374th was relocated to Chardzhou in the Turkestan Military District during late September and October. It was transferred to the 1st Rifle Corps on 30 October, swapping places with the 306th Rifle Division. The 374th was disbanded in early 1946.
