= Ivan Fedyuninsky =

Soviet military leader

Ivan Ivanovich Fedyuninsky
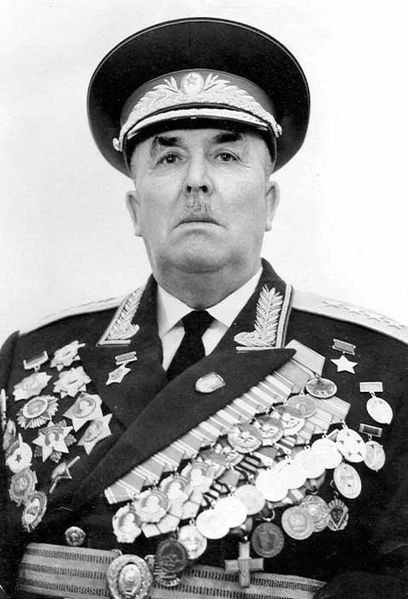
- Born: 30 July 1900; Tugulym, Tobolsk Governorate, Russian Empire
- Died: 17 October 1977 (aged 77); Moscow, Russian SFSR, Soviet Union
- Burial place: Novodevichy Cemetery
- Military career
- Allegiance: Soviet Russia (1919–1922); USSR (1922–1965)
- Branch: Soviet Army
- Service years: 1919–1965
- Rank: General of the Army
- Commands: 82nd Rifle Division; 15th Rifle Corps; 32nd Army; 42nd Army; 5th Army; Leningrad Front; 54th Army; 11th Army; 2nd Shock Army; 7th Guards Army
- Conflicts: Russian Civil War; Sino-Soviet conflict; Soviet–Japanese Border Wars; Battle of Khalkhin Gol; World War II
- Awards: Hero of the Soviet Union

Ivan Ivanovich Fedyuninsky (Russian: Ива́н Ива́нович Федю́нинский; 30 July 1900 – 17 October 1977) was a Soviet military leader and Hero of the Soviet Union (1939).

== Early life ==
Fedyuninsky was born into a peasant family near Tugulym in the Urals. He finished the village school in 1913 and was apprenticed to a painter and decorator. He joined the Red Army in 1919.

== Military career ==
He fought on the Western Front in the Russian Civil War and was wounded twice. On 29 July 1921, he was transferred to 33rd Reserve Regiment at the city of Omsk. He studied at the Red Army Command Staff school in Omsk and in 1923, he was transferred to Vladivostok where he studied at the Infantry school from 1923 to 1924.

Upon completion, he was appointed platoon commander in the 107th rifle regiment. In 1929, as the commander of the 6th company of the 36th Rifle Division of the Far Eastern Military District, he took part in the 1929 Sino-Soviet conflict on the Chinese Eastern Railway. For resourcefulness and skillful leadership shown personal bravery in these battles, he was awarded the Order of the Red Banner and a personal weapon.

In October 1930 he entered Vystrel course. After graduating with honors, he returned to the Far East where he was appointed battalion commander, and in 1936, an assistant regiment commander.

=== Battles of Khalkhin Gol ===
Fedyuninsky served as the commander of the 24th Motorized Regiment in the Battle of Khalkhin Gol, where he won the Hero of the Soviet Union for his valour. He was promoted to divisional commander in 1940, taking over the 82nd Rifle Division, later motorised rifle division.

In the Bain-Tsagan battle, Fedyuninsky's regiment, accompanied by tanks, broke through to the rear of the Japanese troops, causing great damage to the enemy. Having disrupted logistic communications, which led the Japanese to a quick retreat from the bridgehead, they had captured near Mount Bain Tsagan on the western bank of the Khalkhin Gol River. Fedyuninsky's regiment captured a lot of equipment and heavy artillery, which was left over by Japanese troops, after they were forced to clear the bridgehead. For his heroism during the battle, he received the Hero of Soviet Union.

=== World War II ===
Following the start of Operation Barbarossa in 1941, Fedyuninsky was the commander of the 15th Rifle Corps, stationed in the regions of Brest and Kovel in the Byelorussian Soviet Socialist Republic. The corps, which consisted of three divisions, with the beginning of the war, unlike many other formations, successfully fought defensive battles and inflicted several tangible counterattacks on the advancing German troops. After being wounded in these battles, at the direction of the front commander, he was taken by plane to a hospital in Moscow.

In September 1941, in one of the most critical periods in the Battle of Leningrad, he was appointed deputy commander of the Leningrad Front by Marshal Georgy Zhukov, and at the same time appointed as the commander of 42nd Army . After Zhukov's departure in October 1941, he temporarily commanded the front, then, on 27 October, was appointed commander of 54th Army, which under his command took an active part in the Tikhvin defensive and Tikhvin offensive operations as part of Leningrad Strategic Defensive, as a result of which the Soviet troops achieved strategic success. In 1942, the army took part in the Battle of Lyuban, in which it was not successful and suffered heavy losses.

By April 1942, he had been in command of 5th Army on the Western Front and takes part in the Battle of Moscow. In October 1942, he was appointed deputy commander of the Volkhov Front by Marshal Kirill Meretskov. The headquarters of the Supreme Command assigned Fedyuninsky the personal responsibility for breaking the blockade of Leningrad on the right wing of the Volkhov Front. For his successes in Operation Iskra, which was conducted to break through the Shlisselburg-Sinyavinsky ledge, he was awarded the Order of Kutuzov, 1st degree. During the operation, he was seriously wounded.

In May 1943 he was appointed deputy commander of the Bryansk Front. On 14 July 1943, he assumed command of the 11th Army and participated in the battles of Bryansk and Gomel-Rechitsa operations.

In December 1943, he was appointed commander of the 2nd Shock Army near Leningrad, which was striking from the Oranienbaum Bridgehead. By false concentration of troops and equipment on the right flank, he managed to mislead the enemy, while the main blow by concentrated forces in mid-January was inflicted on the main direction from Ropsha, which led to a connection with troops of 42nd Army and the defeat of the German units in the area. Thus, a decisive contribution was made to the operation to lift the blockade of Leningrad.

Later, in the first half of February 1944, the 2nd Shock Army fought heavy battles for Narva, in which they failed to occupy the city. Narva was liberated on 26 July 1944, during the Narva Offensive. The offensive was carried out from the bridgehead, which later received the name "Fedyuninsky bridgehead". At the end of the Tallinn offensive, his unit took part in battles with Army Group North locked in the Courland Pocket and in the East Prussian Operation. He later led his unit during the Battle of Berlin in 1945. For their successful operations, the troops led by him were noted 25 times in the orders of the Supreme Commander-in-Chief.

Fedyuninsky was promoted to lieutenant general on 11 July 1945 and he took part in the Victory Parade on Red Square, in Moscow. From 1946 to 1951 he commanded 7th Guards Army.

=== Later career ===
After the war Fedyuninsky was deputy commander of the Group of Soviet Forces in Germany (1951–54), commander the Transcaucasian (1954–57) and Turkestan (1957–65) Military Districts. He was promoted to the rank of General of the Army in 1955 and was an inspector and advisor to the Soviet Ministry of Defence from 1965 until his death. He was also a deputy in the Supreme Soviet.

He died in Moscow on 17 October 1977, and was buried with full honors at the Novodevichy Cemetery.

== Honours and awards ==
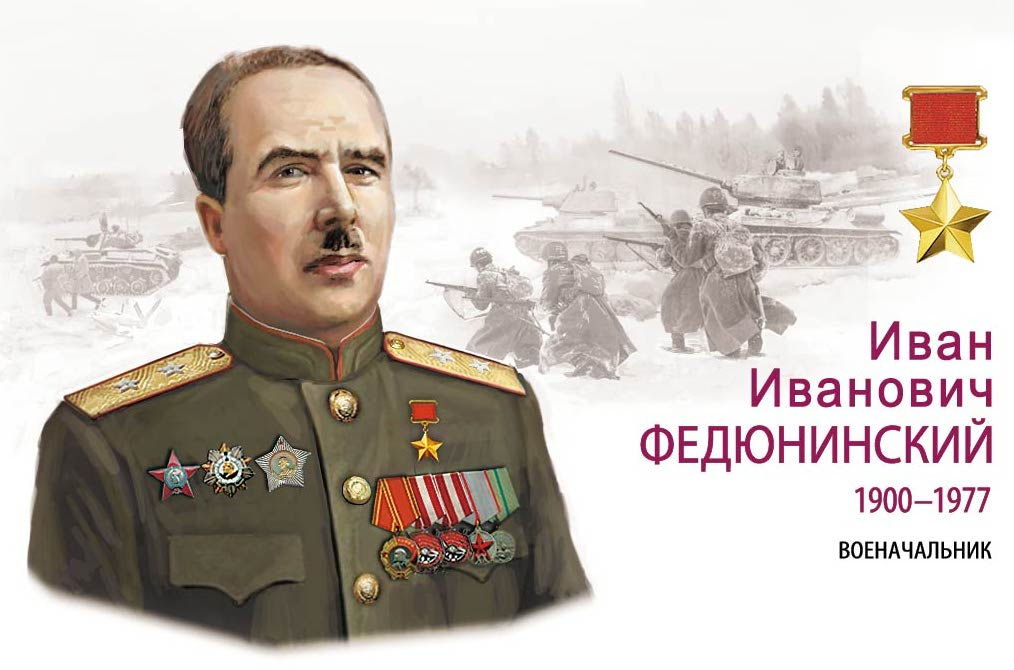
Fedyuninsky on a 2025 postal cover of Russia

Fedyuninsky was awarded four Orders of Lenin, five Orders of the Red Banner, two Orders of Suvorov (1st and 2nd Class), two Orders of Kutuzov, Order of the Red Star, Order for Service to the Homeland in the Armed Forces of the USSR (3rd Class), numerous medals, and a few foreign orders and medals.

=== Soviet ===
Hero of the Soviet Union
Four Orders of Lenin
Five Orders of the Red Banner
Order of Suvorov 1st class, twice
Order of Kutuzov 1st class, twice
Order of the Red Star
Order for Service to the Homeland in the Armed Forces of the USSR, 3rd class
Medal "For the Defence of Leningrad"
Medal "For Distinction in Guarding the State Border of the USSR"
Medal "For the Defence of Kiev"
Medal "For the Victory over Germany in the Great Patriotic War 1941–1945"
Medal "For the Capture of Königsberg"
Medal "For the Capture of Berlin"
Medal "For Development of the Virgin Lands"
Jubilee Medal "Twenty Years of Victory in the Great Patriotic War 1941-1945"
Jubilee Medal "Thirty Years of Victory in the Great Patriotic War 1941-1945"
Medal "Veteran of the Armed Forces of the USSR"
Jubilee Medal "XX Years of the Workers' and Peasants' Red Army"
Jubilee Medal "30 Years of the Soviet Army and Navy"
Jubilee Medal "40 Years of the Armed Forces of the USSR"
Jubilee Medal "50 Years of the Armed Forces of the USSR"
Jubilee Medal "In Commemoration of the 100th Anniversary of the Birth of Vladimir Ilyich Lenin"
Medal "In Commemoration of the 250th Anniversary of Leningrad"

=== Foreign ===
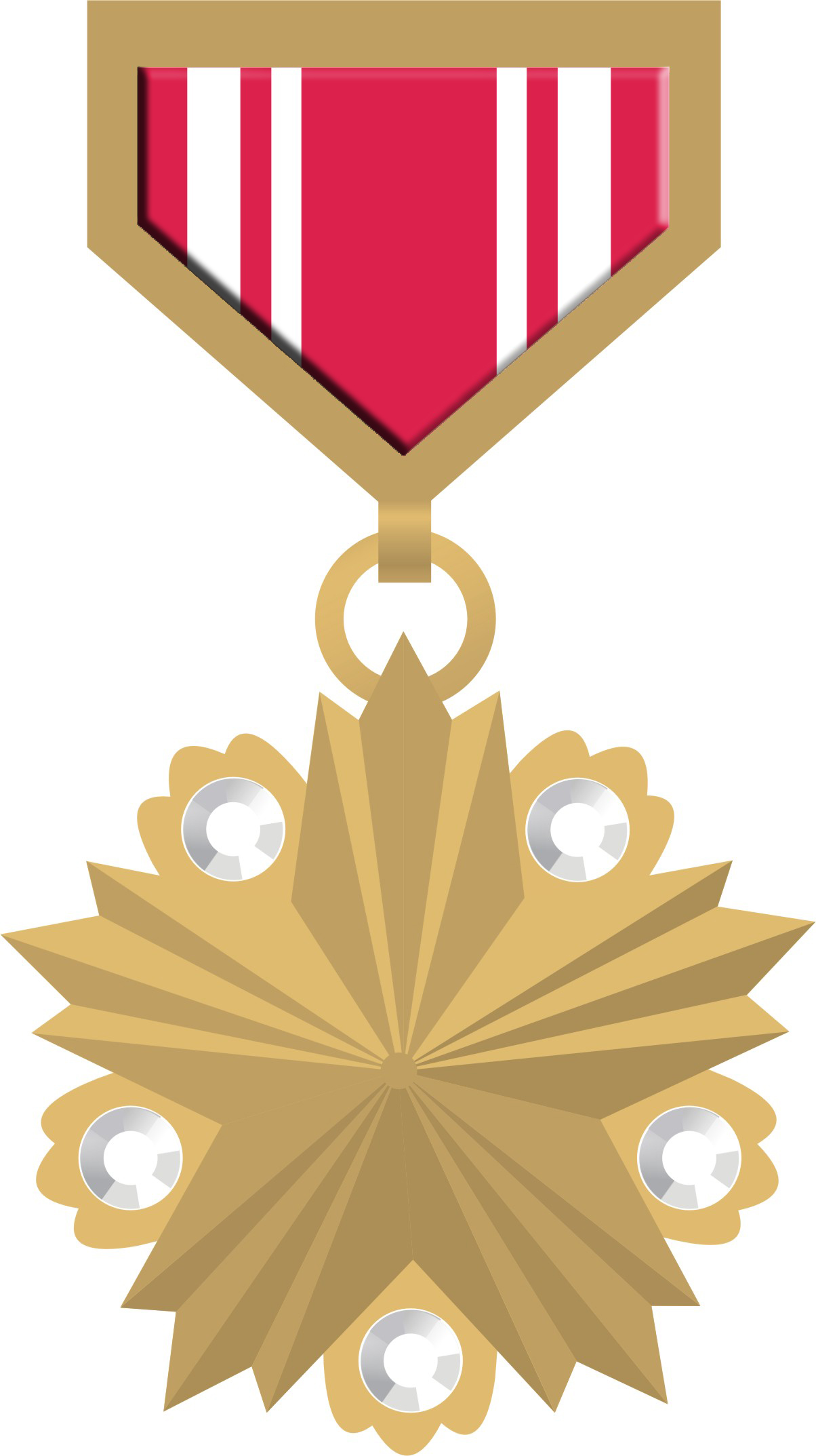
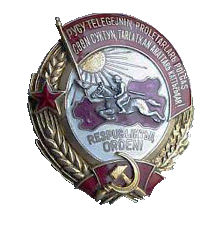
	Hero of the Mongolian People's Republic (Mongolia)
	Order of the Republic (Republic of Tuva)
	Hero of the GDR (East Germany)
	Patriotic Order of Merit in gold (East Germany)
	Order of Sukhbaatar (Mongolia)
	Order of the Red Banner (Mongolia)
	Order of Military Merit, twice (Mongolia)
	Knight's Cross of Order of Polonia Restituta (Poland)
	Gold Cross of the Virtuti Militari (Poland)
	Cross of Grunwald, 2nd class (Poland)
	Medal of Victory and Freedom 1945 (Poland)
	Medal "For Oder, Neisse and the Baltic" (Poland)
?	Cross Olshansky Province (Poland)
	Medal “For Strengthening Friendship in Arms”, Golden degree (Czechoslovakia)

Other awards

He is an honorary citizen of the cities of: Volkhov, Kingisepp, Tallinn, Bryansk, Karachev, Gomel, Choibalsan (Mongolia), Flomberha (Poland).

== Sources and references ==
- John Erickson (historian), The Road to Stalingrad (1975), & The Road to Berlin (1982).
- page in Russian from warheroes.ru
