= 383rd Rifle Division =

383rd Rifle Division 'Shakhterskaya'
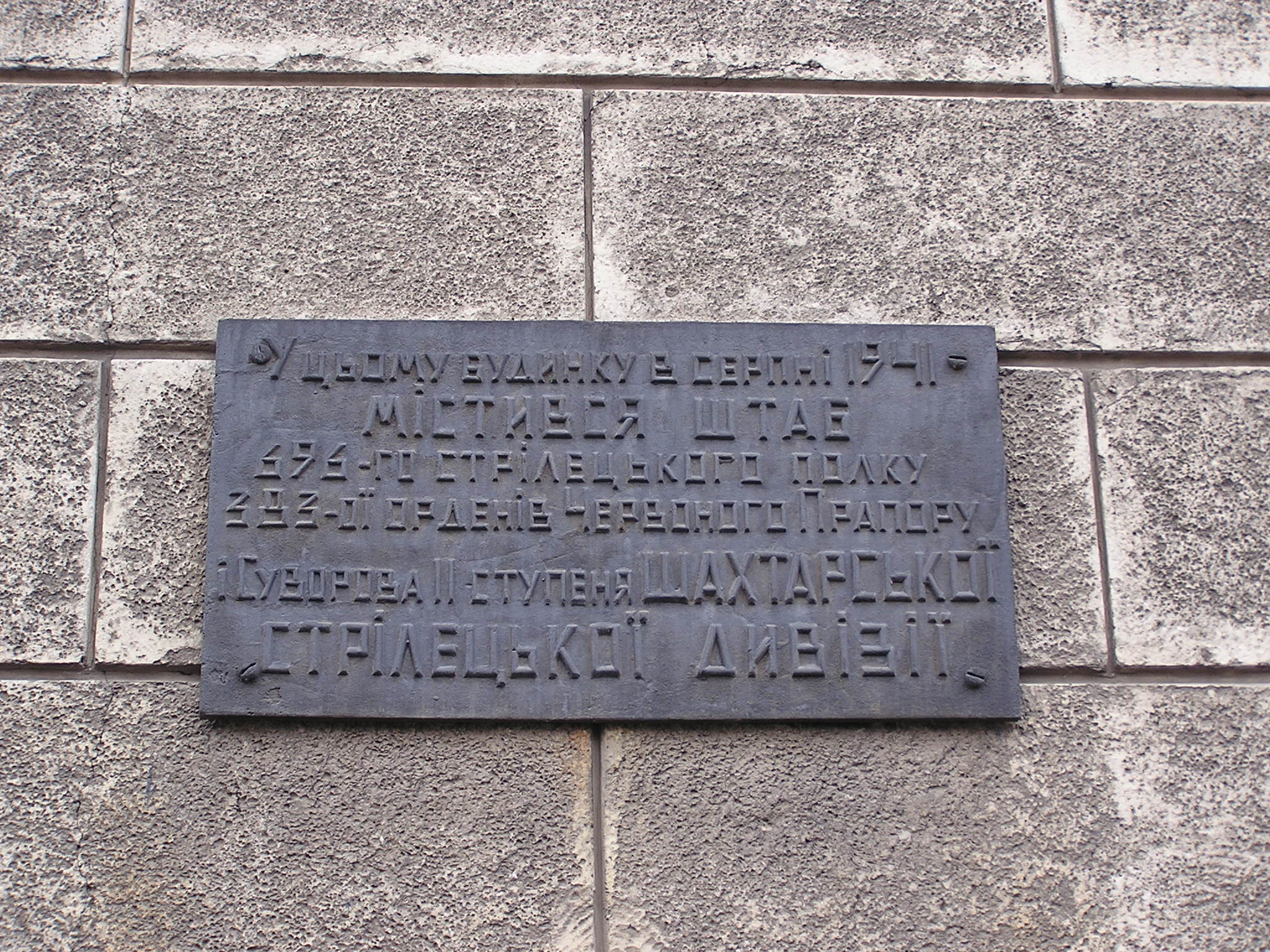
- Commemorative plaque honouring the 383rd Division in Donetsk, Ukraine, on the building of its first headquarters.
- Active: September 1941 – June 1945
- Country: Soviet Union
- Branch: Soviet Army
- Type: Infantry
- Nickname: 'Shakhterskaya'
- Engagements: World War II; Battle of the Caucasus; Battle of the Crimea; Battle of Berlin
- Battle honours: Order of the Red Banner; Order of Suvorov, second class

Commanders
- Notable commanders: Major General Konstantin Provalov

The 383rd 'Miners' Rifle Division (Russian: 383-я 'шахтёрская' стрелковая дивизия) was a formation of the Red Army, created during the Second World War. The division was officially created on 18 August 1941. It was given the name Shakhterskaya (which in Russian literally means 'miners'), as it was originally composed completely of miners from the Donets Basin, Ukrainian SSR (now Ukraine). During the course of the war, its losses were continually replaced, and thus it began to consist not only of miners from Donbas.

== History ==
=== Formation ===
The formation of the division began in August, at mine #6 in Stalino (now Donetsk). The division included six special anti-tank detachments, created by the city committee of Komsomol in Stalino. Specifically for this division, the production of mines, grenades and other anti-tank weapons in the city was drastically increased. Colonel Konstantin Provalov, graduate of the M. V. Frunze Military Academy and Hero of the Soviet Union, was appointed commander of the division. He was later promoted to major general and commanded the Southern Group of Forces during the 1960s.

"The right to command the newly created divisions went to people who knew and the theory and practice of military art – the graduates of the M.V. Frunze Military Academy. The Heroes of the Soviet Union Colonels KI Provalov, ID Zinoviev and AI Petrakovsky were appointed to command the 383rd, 393rd and 395th Rifle Divisions, respectively). So on, 20 August 1941 they were summoned the offices of the People's Commissariat for Defence."

- The defense of Donbass and Stalino in 1941. 383 RD, Donetsk. History. Developments. Data.

=== War service ===
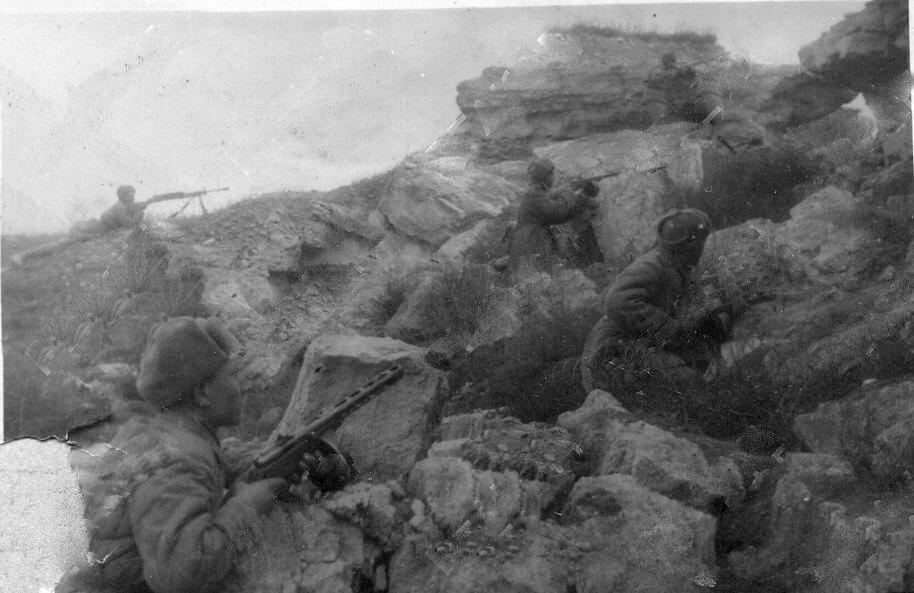
Riflemen of Captain Pyotr Podkidysh's 3rd Battalion, 696th Rifle Regiment conduct reconnaissance by fire during the Kerch–Eltigen operation, November 1943. Podkidysh died of wounds on 23 January 1944.

The formation and training of the division ended in September 1941, when it was put into battle. On 30 September 1941, the 383rd division was incorporated into the 18th Army of the Southern Front. The division then took up defensive positions on the "Krasnoarmiisk-Selydove" line. From 15 October until 22 October, the division participated in the defense of Stalino. By that time, they had claimed to have destroyed 30 tanks, four mortar batteries, two artillery batteries and had killed a large number of German soldiers. By 23 October, the German Army had finally taken Stalino, but the 383rd had fought well and conducted an organised fighting retreat.

Following this defeat, the division was transferred to the Transcaucasian Front, to stop the Germans from penetrating to the oil fields of Azerbaijan. There, the division successfully held defensive positions, refusing to give up ground. In the beginning of 1943 the division fought near Novorossisk. On 7 November 1943 the division crossed the Kerch Strait and landed its troops near Kerch, as part of the Kerch-Eltigen Operation. On 1 January 1944, the division was part of the Separate Coastal Army's 16th Rifle Corps, along with the 89th, 227th, and 339th Rifle Divisions. In April 1944 the division liberated Feodosiya, and later helped liberate Sevastopol. By the end of May 1944 the Transcaucasian Front had completely freed Crimea from German occupation.

In January 1945, the 383rd Division was assigned to the 33rd Army of the 1st Belorussian Front where it served for the rest of the war, advancing through Poland and into Germany. From 16 April to 2 May, the division participated in the Battle of Berlin.

The division was disbanded in the summer of 1945 in Germany in accordance with a Stavka directive of 29 May 1945.

== See also ==
- List of Soviet divisions 1917–1945
- Ukrainian Ground Forces
