= 16th Rifle Corps =

- Active: 1st formation: November 1922 – August 1941; 2nd formation: November 1942 – July 1945
- Allegiance: Soviet Union
- Branch: Soviet Red Army
- Engagements: Soviet invasion of Poland; Eastern Front (World War II); Operation Barbarossa; Baltic Operation; Leningrad Strategic Defensive
- Battle honours: Kalisz (2nd formation)

Commanders
- Notable commanders: Yan Latsis; Georgy Sofronov; Aleksei Grechkin; Konstantin Provalov

The 16th Rifle Corps was a corps of the Soviet Red Army, formed twice.

It took part in the Soviet invasion of Poland in 1939 and destroyed in the Baltic Operation during Operation Barbarossa. Reformed in 1942, the corps fought through the rest of the war on the Eastern Front, and was disbanded immediately postwar.

== History ==
=== First formation ===
The corps was formed in November 1922 at Saratov, part of the Volga Military District. It was relocated to Orsha in October 1923 and Bryansk in November, becoming part of the Western Military District. In January 1924, the corps received the honorific "named for the Bryansk Proletariat", but on 19 November was renamed the 16th Belorussian Territorial Rifle Corps and became a territorial unit after relocating to Mogilev in October. In 1929, the corps was converted back into a regular unit. The 16th Corps fought in the Soviet invasion of Poland in September 1939, occupying what became western Belarus. It became part of the 11th Army by 22 June 1941, under the command of Major General Mikhail Mikhailovich Ivanov. The corps fought against Operation Barbarossa, the German invasion of the Soviet Union, from 22 June 1941, and was disbanded in August.

=== Second formation ===
The second formation became part of the 18th Army, 56th Army and 33rd Army. In 1945 it consisted of the 323rd Rifle Division, 339th Rifle Division, and 383rd Rifle Division as part of the 33rd Army. It was disbanded in July 1945.

== Organization ==
1939:

- 2nd Rifle Division
- 100th Rifle Division

1941: (11th Army, North-Western Front)

- 5th Rifle Division
- 33rd Rifle Division
- 188th Rifle Division
