= Shukurov =

Shukurov is a surname. Notable people with the surname include:

- Adil Shukurov, Azerbaijani footballer
- Alibay Shukurov (born 1977), Azerbaijani athlete
- Alimardon Shukurov (born 1999), Kyrgyz footballer
- Alisher Shukurov (born 2002), Tajik footballer
- Mahir Shukurov, Azerbaijani footballer
- Nadir Shukurov, Azerbaijani footballer
- Otabek Shukurov, Uzbek footballer
- Shirin Shukurov, Azerbaijani soldier
