= Shirin Shukurov =

Azerbaijani Red Army man (1910–1987)

Shirin Agbala oglu Shukurov
- Şirin Ağabala oğlu Şükürov
- Born: 21 March 1910; Zubovka, Baku Governorate, Russian Empire
- Died: 21 September 1987 (aged 77); Ali Bayramli, Azerbaijan SSR, Soviet Union
- Military career
- Allegiance: Soviet Union
- Branch: Red Army
- Service years: 1941–1945
- Rank: Red Army man
- Unit: 339th Rifle Division
- Conflicts: World War II; Battle of the Caucasus; Battle of Rostov (1943) (ru); Battle of Voronezh; Crimean Offensive; Vistula-Oder Offensive
- Awards: Hero of the Soviet Union

Shirin Agabala oglu Shukurov (Azerbaijani: Şirin Ağabala oğlu Şükürov; 21 March 1910 – 21 September 1987) was an Azerbaijani Red Army soldier and Hero of the Soviet Union. Shukurov fought in the Caucasus, the Crimea, the capture of Rostov and Voronezh, and the capture of Belarus. In January 1945, Shukurov was a rifleman in the 1133th Rifle Regiment of the 339th Rifle Division, part of the 1st Belorussian Front's 33rd Army. He was awarded the title Hero of the Soviet Union on 27 February 1945 for his actions during the Vistula–Oder Offensive, in which he reportedly killed several German soldiers despite being wounded twice. Shukurov was demobilized postwar. He became chairman of the village council and worked at an oil depot.

== Early life ==
Shukurov was born on 21 March 1910 in the village of Zubovka (Note: Zubovka was renamed Ali Bayramli in 1938 and is now known as Shirvan.) in Baku Governorate to a working-class family. He graduated from seventh grade and worked in the regional consumer union.

== World War II ==
Shukurov was drafted into the Red Army in June 1941. He fought in combat from August. He fought in the Battle of the Caucasus. Shukurov fought in the capture of Rostov and Voronezh in January–February 1943. He joined the Communist Party of the Soviet Union in 1944. In April and May 1944 Shukurov fought in the Crimean Offensive. For his actions in the capture of Kerch he received the Medal for Battle Merit. During the summer of 1944 Shukurov fought in Operation Bagration.

By January 1945 Shukurov was a rifleman in the 339th Rifle Division's 1138th Rifle Regiment. He fought in the Vistula–Oder Offensive in the same month. On 14 January during a breakthrough in German defenses in the village of Siekierki southeast of Zwoleń, Shukurov was reportedly among the first into the German trenches. With machine gun fire and grenades he reportedly killed several German soldiers. He was reportedly twice wounded but continued to fight. After reaching the third line of trenches Shukurov lost consciousness from blood loss and was removed from the battlefield. On 27 February 1945 he received the title Hero of the Soviet Union and the Order of Lenin.

== Postwar ==
After the end of the war, Shukurov was demobilized. He became chairman of the village council of Ali Bayramli and worked at the Ali Bayramli Oil Depot. On 6 April 1985 he received the Order of the Patriotic War 1st class on the 40th anniversary of the end of the war. Shukurov died on 21 September 1987.
