= Konstantin Provalov =

Soviet army colonel general (1906–1981)

Konstantin Ivanovich Provalov
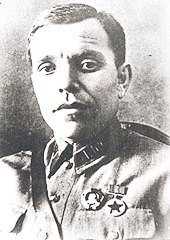
- Native name: Константин Иванович Провалов
- Born: 12 June 1906; Babushkino village, Balagansky Uyezd, Irkutsk Governorate, Russian Empire
- Died: 8 December 1981 (aged 75) Moscow, Soviet Union
- Buried: Novodevichy Cemetery
- Allegiance: Soviet Union
- Branch: Soviet Army
- Service years: 1928–1981
- Rank: Colonel general
- Commands: 383rd Rifle Division 16th Rifle Corps; 113th Rifle Corps; 36th Rifle Corps; 3rd Guards Rifle Corps; 9th Guards Rifle Corps; 13th Rifle Corps; 31st Special Rifle Corps; 4th Army Southern Group of Forces
- Conflicts: Sino-Soviet conflict (1929); Battle of Lake Khasan; World War II; Battle of the Caucasus; Kerch-Eltigen Operation; Crimean Offensive; Vitebsk-Orsha Offensive; Prague Offensive
- Awards: Hero of the Soviet Union Order of Lenin (4); Order of the Red Banner (3); Order of Suvorov 1st class Order of Suvorov 2nd class (2); Order of Kutuzov 2nd class Order of the Red Star; Order for Service to the Homeland in the Armed Forces of the USSR 3rd class Order of the Flag of the Republic of Hungary Order of the Red Banner (Mongolia)

Konstantin Ivanovich Provalov (Russian: Константин Иванович Провалов; 12 June 1906 – 8 December 1981) was a Soviet Army Colonel general and Hero of the Soviet Union. Provalov was awarded the title Hero of the Soviet Union and the Order of Lenin for his leadership of a regiment in the Battle of Lake Khasan. After Operation Barbarossa, Provalov became the commander of the 383rd Rifle Division. He led the division during the Battle of the Caucasus. In 1943, he became commander of the 16th Rifle Corps and fought in the Kerch–Eltigen Operation and Crimean Offensive. In May 1944, Provalov transferred to command the 113th Rifle Corps and led it during the Vitebsk–Orsha Offensive. In July he became commander of 36th Rifle Corps, which fought in the Minsk Offensive, the Gumbinnen Operation, the Battle of Königsberg and the Prague Offensive. Postwar, Probalov led the 3rd Guards Rifle Corps, 9th Guards Rifle Corps, 13th Rifle Corps and 31st Special Rifle Corps. In 1958, he became commander of the 4th Army. From 1962 to 1968 he led the Southern Group of Forces.

== Early life ==
Provalov was born on 11 June 1906 in Babushkino village in Irkutsk Governorate in the family of a miner. He was a cousin of Double Hero of the Soviet Union Afanasy Beloborodov. He graduated from seven grades and worked as a land surveyor. He later became chairman of the village Selsoviet.

== Interwar ==
Provalov was drafted into the Red Army in September 1928.

In 1929 he graduated from the regimental school of the 39th Rifle Division's 117th Rifle Regiment. Provalov became an assistant platoon commander and fought in the Sino-Soviet conflict over the Chinese Eastern Railway between September and November. He was wounded during the fighting.

In 1930 he joined the Communist Party of the Soviet Union. Provalov graduated from the Irkutsk Infantry School in 1931. In December of that year, he became a platoon leader in the regiment. He then became a company commander and later commanded the division's separate machine gun company.

In 1933 he graduated from the Omsk Military School.

In November 1937 Provalov became chief of staff of the 40th Rifle Division's 120th Rifle Regiment. He became the regimental commander in July 1938.

Provalov led the regiment in the Battle of Lake Khasan between July and August 1938. The regiment defeated Japanese troops on Zaozyornaya Hill. Provalov was reportedly wounded twice but continued to lead the regiment.

On 25 October 1938, Provalov was awarded the title Hero of the Soviet Union and the Order of Lenin for his leadership. He was also promoted to the rank of Colonel.

In April 1939 he was sent to the Frunze Military Academy and graduated from there in 1941.

== World War II ==
In August 1941 Provalov was sent to Donetsk to form the 383rd Rifle Division. Provalov led the division in the defence of Donetsk but was forced to retreat in October. The division then fought in the Battle of Rostov during November. Provalov was wounded in the fighting. Provalov was promoted to Major general on 27 March 1942.

In the summer of 1942 the division defended the approaches to Tuapse during the Battle of the Caucasus.

In January 1943 the division fought in the Krasnodar Offensive.

In June 1943 Provalov became commander of the 16th Rifle Corps. On 25 October 1943 he was awarded the Order of the Red Banner. The corps fought in the Kerch–Eltigen Operation in November 1943. The corps then fought in battles to expand the bridgehead until March 1944. In April it fought in the Crimean Offensive and captured Kerch, Feodosia, Alushta, Yalta, Alupka and Balaklava. On 20 April, he was awarded the Order of the Red Star for 15 years of service. On 11 May Provalov was awarded the Order of Suvorov 1st class. At the end of May, Provalov became commander of the 31st Army's 113th Rifle Corps. He led the corps in the Vitebsk–Orsha Offensive. In July he was transferred to command the army's 36th Rifle Corps. The corps fought in the Minsk Offensive and the Belostock Offensive during the summer. On 3 July he was awarded the Order of Kutuzov 2nd class. On 8 July, Provalov was recommended for a second award of the title Hero of the Soviet Union by 31st Army commander Vasily Glagolev, but 3rd Belorussian Front Commander Ivan Chernyakhovsky downgraded the award to the Order of Suvorov 2nd class. In October the corps fought in the Gumbinnen Operation.

During January and February 1945, the corps fought in the East Prussian Offensive. During the offensive, the corps crossed the Neman and was awarded the honorific "Neman". Provalov was awarded the Order of the Red Banner for his leadership. In April 1945 the corps was transferred with the 31st Army to the 1st Ukrainian Front and fought in the Prague Offensive. On 19 April 1945 Provalov was awarded a second Order of Suvorov 2nd class for his leadership.

== Postwar ==
In July 1945 Provalov became commander of the 3rd Guards Rifle Corps. In April 1947 he became commander of the 9th Guards Rifle Corps. Provalov was sent to the Military Academy of the General Staff in December 1948 and graduated in 1950.

On 5 November 1949 he was promoted to Lieutenant general.

In February 1952 he was assigned to the 2nd Main Directorate of the General Staff. In December 1952 he became head of combat training for the Transcaucasian Military District. Provalov became commander of the 13th Rifle Corps in December 1953. In 1956 the corps became the 31st Special Rifle Corps. In October 1957, it was renamed the 31st Special Army Corps. In January 1958 Provalov became commander of the 4th Army. He became first deputy commander of the Carpathian Military District in June 1959.

In May 1961 he was promoted to colonel general. Provalov commanded the Southern Group of Forces in Hungary from September 1962.In the summer of 1968 he helped plan Operation Danube, the Soviet invasion of Czechoslovakia.

In October 1969 he became a deputy chief inspector of the Ministry of Defence. Provalov became an adviser with the Group of Inspectors General in August 1973. On 6 May 1974 Provalov became an honorary citizen of Sevastopol.

He died on 10 December 1981 and was buried in Novodevichy Cemetery.
