= 11th Army (Soviet Union) =

- 11-я армия
- Active: September 1939 – December 1943
- Country: Soviet Union
- Branch: Red Army
- Type: Combined arms
- Size: Field army
- Engagements: World War II

Commanders
- Notable commanders: Pavel Kurochkin

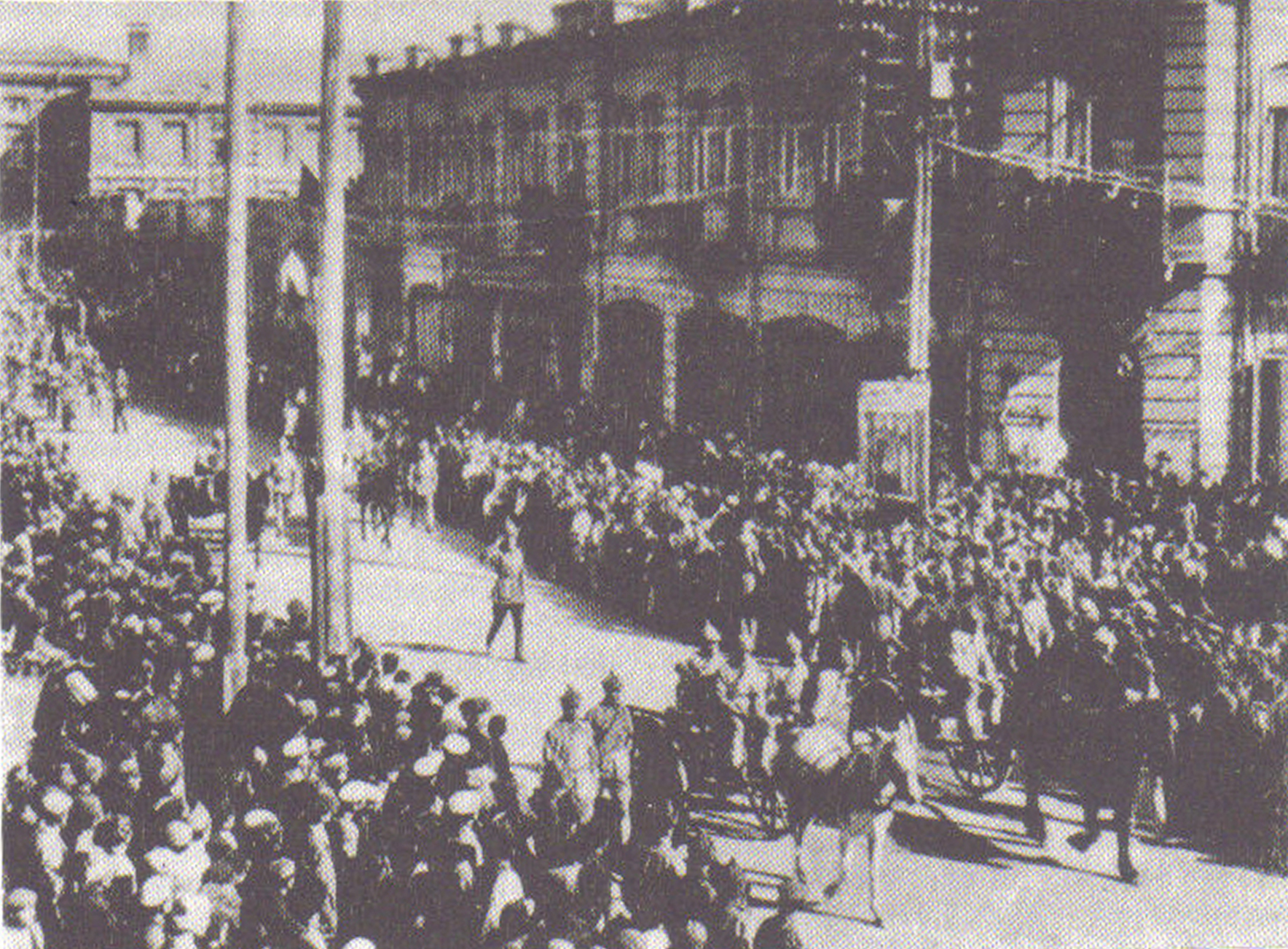
11th Red Army Marches into the city of Yerevan

The 11th Army (Russian: 11-я армия) was an army of the Red Army during World War II. The army was formed in the Belarusian Special Military District (BSMD) in 1939 from the former Minsk Army Group. It fought in the Soviet invasion of Poland, the Baltic Operation, the Demyansk Pocket, and the Battle of Kursk. The army disbanded in December 1943.

== World War II ==
In 1939, the 11th Army was formed in the Belarusian Special Military District (BSMD) from the former Minsk Army Group. It took part in the Soviet invasion of Poland. In the summer of 1940 it became part of the Baltic Military District (from 17 August 1940 the Baltic Special military district).

During the German invasion of the Soviet Union in June 1941, the 11th Army included the 16th Rifle Corps (which included the 5th, 33rd and 188th Rifle Divisions), the 29th Rifle Corps (179th and 184th Rifle Divisions), the 3rd Mechanised Corps (640 tanks), the 23rd, 126th and 128th Rifle Divisions, the 42nd (Siauliai) and 46th Fortified Regions (Telsiai), the 45th Fortified Regions, and other smaller formations and units. It participated in military operations as part of the Soviet Northwestern Front west and south-west of Kaunas and Vilnius.

After 9 July 1941, it included the 41st, 22nd Rifle Corps, and the 1st Mechanised Corps. After 1 September 1941, it included the 180th, 182nd, 183rd, 202nd, 254th Rifle Divisions, 21st Motor Rifle Regiment, 9th Anti-Tank Artillery Brigade, 614th Corps Artillery Regiment, 698th Anti-Tank Artillery Regiment, the 87th and 110th Independent Tank Battalions, 7th Mixed Aviation Division, and a number of separate formations.

In 1942 and 1943 it participated in attacks against the Wehrmacht near Solzy and Staraya Russa and in operations around the Demyansk Pocket. In the summer and fall 1943 it was part of the Western Front. In mid July 1943 the Army commanded the 53rd Rifle Corps, the 4th, 96th, 260th, 273rd and 323rd Rifle Division, the 225th Tank Regiment and other units. From July 30, 11th Army joined the Bryansk Front, and fought in the Battle of Kursk.

In December 1943 the 11th Army was dissolved, with the personnel being integrated into other Soviet armies.

The commanders of the 11th Army were:

- Nikifor Medvedev (7 September 1939 – 26 July 1940)
- Vasili Morozov (26 July 1940 – 18 November 1942)
- Pavel Kurochkin (18 November 1942 – 15 March 1943)
- Anton Lopatin (15 March 1943 – 14 July 1943)
- Ivan Fedyuninsky (14 July 1943 – 23 December 1943)
