= 395th Rifle Division =

395th Rifle Division (6 October 1941 – 1945)
- Active: 1941 - 1945
- Country: Soviet Union
- Branch: Red Army
- Type: Division
- Role: Infantry
- Engagements: Battle of Rostov (1941); Mius-Front; Battle of the Caucasus; Novorossiysk-Taman Operation; Battle of the Dniepr; Battle of Kiev (1943); Dnieper–Carpathian Offensive; Zhitomir–Berdichev Offensive; Kamenets-Podolsky Pocket; Lvov–Sandomierz Offensive; Vistula-Oder Offensive; Lower Silesian Offensive; Battle of the Oder–Neisse; Berlin Strategic Offensive; Prague Offensive
- Decorations: Order of the Red Banner; Order of Suvorov
- Battle honours: Taman

Commanders
- Notable commanders: Maj. Gen. Anatoly Petrakovsky; Maj. Gen. Sabir Umar-Ogly Rakhimov; Maj. Gen. Adam Petrovich Turchinskii; Maj. Gen. Aleksandr Vasilevich Vorozhishchev; Maj. Gen. Pavel Fedoseevich Ilinykh; Col. Fyodor Aleksandrovich Afanasev

The 395th Rifle Division was converted from a militia division to a regular infantry division of the Red Army in October 1941. From 1941-45, it fought against the German invasion, Operation Barbarossa. As a militia unit it was under command of the Kharkov Military District and designated as the Voroshilovgrad Militia Division, although it was unofficially known as the 395th before it was converted. It took part in the fighting near Rostov-on-Don during the winter of 1941–42 in the 18th Army, and retreated with that Army into the northern Caucasus mountains in the face of the German summer offensive, fighting under the command of the 18th and 12th Armies, then in the 56th Army in October. As the Axis forces retreated from the Caucasus in early 1943 it was sent to the 46th and later to the 37th Army of North Caucasus Front. During the battles that cleared the German forces from the Taman Peninsula from August to October the 395th was back in 56th Army and was awarded a battle honor for its part in the campaign. By the end of 1943 it had returned to 18th Army, now under 1st Ukrainian Front near Kyiv. In January 1944 the division was decorated with both the Order of the Red Banner and the Order of Suvorov. With its Front it advanced through western Ukraine, Poland and eastern Germany, finally taking part in the Lower Silesian, Berlin, and Prague offensives in early 1945 as part of 13th Army.

== Voroshilovgrad Militia Division ==
This unit formed in July 1941 in the Voroshilovgrad oblast from volunteer workers' battalions. The city and its surrounding areas mobilized 148,000 men into the militia in July - August, forming three divisions, 30 regiments and 59 separate battalions. Most of this manpower went into the Red Army as individual replacements but by the end of August one division was transferred to Kharkov Military District control, where it was unofficially redesignated as the 395th Rifle Division as early as 1 September.

== Formation ==
The 395th was officially converted from the Voroshilovgrad Division on 6 October in the Kharkov District. Its order of battle, based on the first wartime shtat (table of organization and equipment) for rifle divisions, was as follows:

- 714th Rifle Regiment
- 723rd Rifle Regiment
- 726th Rifle Regiment
- 968th Artillery Regiment
- 692nd Antiaircraft Battalion
- 29th Antitank Battalion (from 15 January 1942)
- 576th Mortar Battalion (until 5 November 1942)
- 467th Reconnaissance Company
- 686th Sapper Battalion
- 856th Signal Battalion (later 1441st Signal Company)
- 490th Medical/Sanitation Battalion
- 483rd Chemical Protection (Anti-gas) Company
- 306th Motor Transport Company
- 259th Field Bakery
- 829th Divisional Veterinary Hospital
- 1416th Field Postal Station
- 763rd Field Office of the State Bank

The division's first official commander, Col. Anatoly Petrakovsky, was not appointed until 1 April 1942. By 11 October 1941, the second formation of the 18th Army had been destroyed in the Battle of the Sea of Azov. The 395th became part of its third formation, moving into Southern Front by 18 October.

=== Battle of Rostov ===
In the subsequent Battle of Rostov both the Soviet and German forces moved simultaneously on 17 November. The right-flank divisions of 18th Army covered against a German drive on Voroshilovgrad while those on the left flank, including the 395th, failed to gain any success; the remainder of the battle would primarily involve the 9th, 37th and 56th Armies on the Soviet side. Following the German retreat to the Mius River the division moved up to that line with its Army and remained there through the winter and spring.

== Battle of the Caucasus ==
When the German summer offensive began in late June, the division was still in 18th Army of Southern Front. The attack on the southern sector began on 7 July, and the 395th was in the northern half of its Front's sector, in the first echelon along the east bank of the Mius, alongside the 383rd and 353rd Rifle Divisions, with only one division and the 64th Tank Brigade in reserve. The weight of the attack by German Army Group A soon forced Southern Front into a precarious retreat. On 21 July Colonel Petrakovskii was promoted to the rank of major general. The next day the LVII Panzer Corps encircled Rostov's outer defenses. By this time 18th Army had withdrawn most of its forces out of the city and across the Don River, leaving just two regiments of the 395th in Rostov despite orders from the Front to defend it beside the 56th Army. The panzer troops were poorly equipped to secure the heavily fortified city, which did not fall until 27 July, by which time most of the personnel of the two regiments had managed to escape southwards.

While the battle for Rostov raged, Army Group A began advancing into the Caucasus region on 25 July. At this time 18th Army was defending a 50 km sector from the Kagalnik at the mouth of the Don eastward to Kiziterinka, 20 km southeast of Rostov. By 1 August the division and its Army had come under the command of the North Caucasus Front. Later that month it was briefly reassigned to 12th Army, but when that Army was disbanded it returned to the control of 18th Army, which was now part of the Black Sea Group of Forces under Transcaucasus Front. On 4 September General Petrakovskii handed his command over to Col. Sabir Umar-Ogly Rakhimov, who had previously been the deputy commander of the 353rd Division.

The German 17th Army launched its Operation Attika on 23 September with the objective of reaching Tuapse on the Black Sea coast and encircling most of 18th Army in the process. At this time the 395th was on the far left (north) flank of its Army in the area of Fanagoriiskoe, protected by defenses that had been built in depth over the preceding weeks. The LVII Panzer Corps assaulted the division's forward defenses with its 198th Infantry Division, supported by tanks of the Slovak Motorized Division, on 23 and 24 September, but made only limited gains. The attack was expanded on the 25th, committing more of the Slovak Division and also hitting the positions of the 30th Rifle Division, but the result was similar. Despite these defensive successes, on 2 October Stavka ordered two regiments of the 408th Rifle Division into the sector as reinforcements.

After regrouping and rest, the German 17th Army resumed its offensive on 14 October. The 125th Infantry Division had been shifted to the 198th's sector and advanced southwest from the region east of Fanagoriiskoe. According to German sources this assault "completely wiped out" the 714th and 726th Regiments. On the 17th the 198th Infantry penetrated southward about 8 km; on the same day the new commander of the Black Sea Group, Maj. Gen. I. E. Petrov, visited the retreating troops of 18th Army and after learning of defective communications and tactics relieved Maj. Gen. F. V. Kamkov of his command. The German advance resumed on 19 October and the 395th lost Mount Kochkanova to the 198th Infantry. By this time the division, along with the 32nd Guards Rifle Division, was in danger of being encircled and was ordered to withdraw the next day. As of 1 November it had been reassigned to the 56th Army.

== Into Ukraine ==
During December the 395th was largely rebuilt with assets of the 11th NKVD Rifle Division, which was removed from Red Army control in the same month. As the Axis forces retreated from the Caucasus in January 1943 the division was sent to the 46th Army and then in March to the 37th Army, now in North Caucasus Front. On 19 March Colonel Rakhimov was promoted to the rank of major general and on 9 April he handed his command to Maj. Gen. Adam Petrovich Turchinskii. During the final battles against the German forces in the Taman peninsula from August to October the division was under command of the 22nd Rifle Corps of the 56th Army and in September was awarded the battle honor "Taman" for its efforts. On 18 October General Turchinskii was moved to command of the 2nd Guards Rifle Division, and was replaced by Col. Aleksandr Vasilevich Vorozhishchev.

By the start of November the 395th, still in 22nd Corps, had returned to 18th Army, which was moved north to the Kiev area to join the 1st Ukrainian Front. The division would remain under this Front for the duration of the war. Beginning on 5 December the German XXXXVIII Panzer Corps launched a counteroffensive against the Front's forces advancing west of Kiev, retaking Zhitomir and threatening to encircle the 60th Army. The 18th and 1st Tank Armies moved to the area as fast as conditions allowed and forced the panzers over to the defensive on 21 December before going over to the attack themselves three days later. The division distinguished itself in this fighting; on 1 January 1944 it was awarded the Order of the Red Banner and on 6 January it was further awarded the Order of Suvorov, 2nd Degree.

In preparation for the Proskurov-Chernovtsy Operation in early March, 1st Ukrainian Front carried out a significant regrouping during which the 395th was reassigned to the 107th Rifle Corps of 1st Guards Army. In April it was moved again, now to the 18th Guards Rifle Corps of 38th Army. On 3 June Colonel Vorozhishchev was promoted to major general. In August the division was withdrawn to the Front reserves in 74th Rifle Corps. General Vorozhishchev handed his command to Col. Ivan Afanasevich Fomin on 2 September. On 5 September the 395th was assigned, with 74th Corps, to 13th Army, and it spent the rest of the war in that Army.

== Into Germany ==
Colonel Fomin was replaced in command by Maj. Gen. Pavel Fedoseevich Ilinykh on 2 October, who was in turn replaced by Col. Fyodor Aleksandrovich Afanasev on the first day of the new year. At this time the 395th was a separate division in 13th Army. By the beginning of February the division had been subordinated to the 24th Rifle Corps, where it would remain for the duration. By the end of the advance though Poland 13th Army had reached the Oder River along the entire front from Keben to Malcz, forced the river with the assistance of 4th Tank Army and captured a bridgehead west of Keben and Steinau up to 16 km deep and 30 km wide, as well as a smaller one on the left flank. As of 28 January the 24th Corps was in the Army's second echelon on the east bank of the Oder northeast of Wolau.

1st Ukrainian Front carried out a substantial regrouping from 29 January to 7 February during which the total frontage held by 13th Army was reduced from 86 km to just 18 km. 24th Corps, consisting of the 395th, 350th and 147th Rifle Divisions, was in the first echelon with the 102nd Rifle Corps. All six divisions of the two corps were in first echelon with two rifle regiments up and one in reserve, and their sectors averaged 3 km in width. The offensive began at 0930 hours on 8 February, following a 50-minute artillery preparation. 102nd Corps quickly crushed the first German position and advanced up to 8 km by day's end. 24th Corps, on the other hand, faced two heavily fortified villages on its right flank and a large woods stretching well to the west. The attacks on the villages were stymied, even with the backing of the 61st Tank Brigade. However the Corps' left flank division took advantage of the success of 52nd Army's attack to its left, advanced 4 km and reached Oberau. Jointly these advances put the two Armies in good position to outflank and possibly encircle the Hermann Göring Panzer Division, which was defending the large woods.

On 9 February the 24th Corps advanced up to 15 km, reaching Kotzenau with part of its forces while the remainder deployed facing north, blocking passage to the south by the now-surrounded German panzer troops. The next day the main body of 13th Army advanced in the wake of 4th Tank Army, with the objective of forcing the Bober River. On the 11th the Front's shock group faced stiffening German resistance while 24th Corps spent the entire day fighting with rearguards which were covering the main forces' retreat to the Bober. By the end of the day the main shock group had advanced up to 60 km and had expanded the width of the breakthrough to 160 km, reaching the Bober along a number of sectors. The Corps spent most of 12 and 13 February battling for the town of Sprottau before reaching the Bober in the Sagan area, encountering powerful resistance from German infantry and armor in the eastern part of the town while also forcing a crossing of the river to its north. For their roles in this fighting, on 5 April the 726th Rifle Regiment would be awarded the Order of Aleksandr Nevski, and the 714th and 732rd Regiments would each receive the Order of the Red Star.

Infantry and up to 20 tanks of the Großdeutschland Panzer Corps attacked the bridgehead north of Sagan on 14 February. This was countered with the assistance of the 63rd Tank Brigade of 10th Tank Corps and the German force went over to the defensive. Over the next two days the 24th Corps fought to secure Sagan, finally forcing a crossing of the Bober in the center of the town on the 16th, and then cleared its western sector. This success threatened to outflank Großdeutschland and allowed 27th Rifle Corps to expand the main bridgehead. By 19 February the final attempts of the German forces to hold along the Bober crumbled, and what remained of them began retreating to the Neisse River. By 24 February the 13th Army had closed up to the line of that river, and soon went over to the defensive.

=== Berlin Strategic Offensive ===
As of 1 April the 395th and 350th Divisions made up 24th Corps, but before the Berlin Operation began the 350th was detached to direct Front command and the 121st Guards Rifle Division took its place. On 13 April, in a final change in command, Col. Aleksei Nikolaievich Korusevich took over the division from Colonel Afanasev. At this time the strength of 13th Army's rifle divisions varied from 4,700 to 5,700 men each. The Army was deployed on the east bank of the Neisse on a 10 km front from Klein Bademeusel to just outside Gross Saerchen, with the 27th and 102nd Corps in first echelon and the 24th in second. The offensive on 1st Ukrainian Front's sector began at dawn on 16 April with attacks across the Neisse and from a bridgehead that had been forced across the river south of Forst in February and made immediate progress. By about 20 April the 121st Guards was shifted to 27th Corps and the 395th was pulled back to the Army's second echelon. On the 23rd it concentrated in Luckau, with its new Corps-mate, the 117th Guards Rifle Division in the Finsterwalde area.

By the morning of 26 April the division had occupied the line Golssen to Baruth with its front facing east, as the encircled German 9th Army attempted to break out to the west; the 117th Guards had organized a circular defense at Luckenwalde while the 280th Rifle Division, which had now joined 24th Corps, remained in reserve. Overnight on 25/26 April the encircled forces formed a powerful group in the area of Halbe, including more than 50 tanks, and attacked west at 0800 hours at the boundary of the 3rd Guards and 28th Armies. The force broke through and reached the northern outskirts of Baruth but the 395th beat off all attempts to take the town. The German group took up positions in the woods north of Baruth and put up fierce resistance on 27 April, including hand-to-hand fighting and persistent breakout attempts but over the course of the day the joint actions of the division and a corps of the 28th Army were able to eliminate all but a few remnants. In total, 6,200 prisoners, 47 tanks, 25 armored personnel carriers, 180 guns and mortars and 1,133 motor vehicles were captured. The division remained on the same line the next day as the 9th Army pocket shrank to 10 km north to south and 14 km east to west.

On 30 April, facing further attempts of the 9th Army to escape to the west, the command of 13th Army pulled the division from the line it had held and redeployed it along the front from Munchendorf to Neuhof, with the objective of attacking into Sperenberg to cut off German forces which had broken through to this area. The 117th Guards received similar orders. Despite heavy losses the German force attacked furiously along the line from Sperenberg to Kummersdorf in an effort to reach their 12th Army attacking from the west. Units of the 117th Guards and the 71st Mechanized Brigade were dislodged and the force advanced another 10 km to the Woltersdorf area before being halted by the remainder of the 117th, while the 395th's attack towards Spremberg was halted by stubborn resistance. Overnight the leading elements of the encircled group reached to within 3 – 4 km of 12th Army, but during 1 May most of the remnants were rounded up. On the same day the 1st Ukrainian Front received orders to prepare for a new advance on Prague, and the division ended the war advancing on that city.

== Postwar ==
The officers and personnel of the division ended the war with the full title 395th Rifle, Taman, Order of the Red Banner, Order of Suvorov Division. [Russian: 395-я стрелковая Таманьская Краснознамённая ордена Суворова дивизия.] According to STAVKA Order No. 11096 of 29 May 1945, part 3, 13th Army was to be moved to the area of Bautzen by 10 June. With its corps and army, the division was relocated to Volodymyr-Volynskyi in the Carpathian Military District, where it was disbanded with the rest of the 24th Rifle Corps in 1946.
