= 270th Rifle Division =

- Active: 1st formation: July 1941 – May 1942; 2nd formation: July 1942 – 1946, 1953–1955
- Country: Soviet Union
- Branch: Red Army; Soviet Army
- Type: Rifle division
- Engagements: World War II
- Decorations: Order of the Red Banner (2nd formation)
- Battle honours: Demidov (2nd formation)

The 270th Rifle Division (Russian: 270-я стрелковая дивизия) was a Red Army infantry division formed twice during World War II, in 1941 and 1942.

The division was first formed in July 1941 and was destroyed in the Second Battle of Kharkov. Reformed in the summer of 1942, the division fought on the Eastern Front for the rest of the war. Postwar, it was relocated to the south Urals and downsized into a brigade. The brigade was briefly expanded back to a division in 1953, but was renumbered in 1955.

== History ==
=== First Formation ===
The 270th began forming on 10 July 1941 at Melitopol, part of the Odessa Military District, under the command of Colonel Zaki Kutlin. Its key fighting units included the 973rd, 975th, and the 977th Rifle Regiments, as well as the 810th Artillery Regiment. Formed from militia and reservists east of the Dnieper bend in about a month, the division was assigned to the Southern Front's 12th Army by late August. In September, it was transferred to the 6th Army of the Southwestern Front. In January 1942, the 270th participated in the Barvenkovo–Lozovaya Offensive, during which Soviet advances resulted in the formation of a large bulge at Izyum in Soviet lines to the south of Kharkov. At the end of the month, the division helped capture the critical rail junction at Lozovaya.

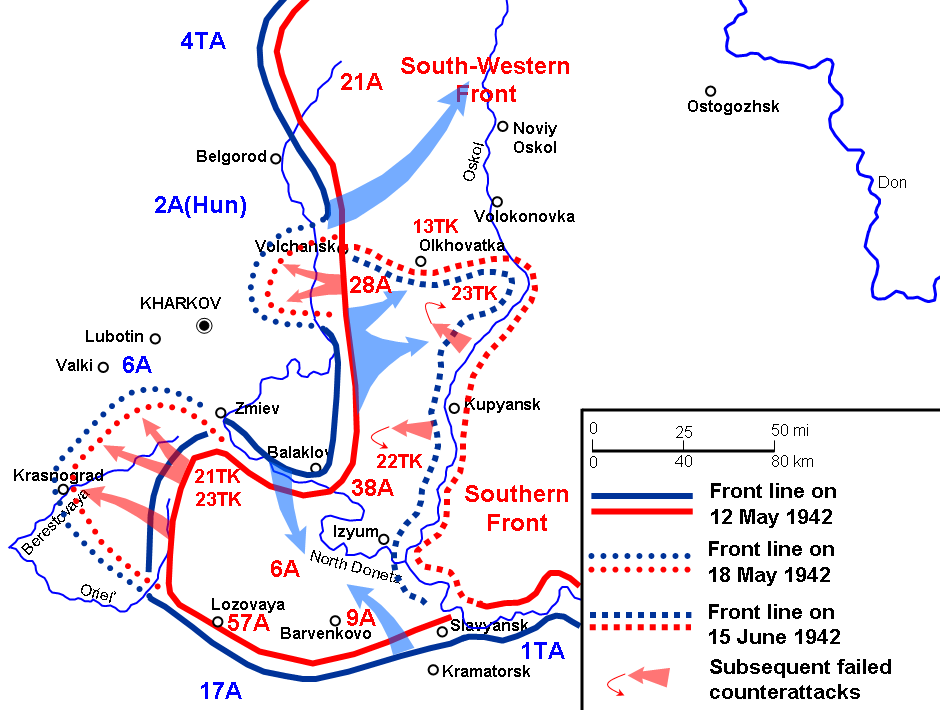
Soviet and German movements in the Second Battle of Kharkov

During the initial attack in the Second Battle of Kharkov, the 270th was assigned to Army Group Bobkin. The group was to break through the German line in the sector of Koshparovka and Kiptivka, capture a line from Dmitrovka to Seredovka, and allow the 6th Cavalry Corps to advance through the gap. The group was to advance to the west and southwest, capturing the line of Sofievka, Tarasovka, and Andreyevka by the end of the fourth day of the offensive, and reach the line of Kegichevka, Dar Nadezhdy, Sakhnovshchina, and Lukashevka by the end of the seventh day. On 11 May, the day before the beginning of the offensive, a regiment of the division was concentrated in the first echelon in the Koshparovka and Kiptivka sector alongside the 393rd Rifle Division. The two remaining regiments of the division defended a line from Nizhnaya Plesovaya to Petrovka.

The German attack in the Second Battle of Kharkov trapped Soviet forces in this bulge, which became known as the Izyum pocket. The 270th was among the divisions wiped out, and was officially disbanded on 25 May.

=== Second Formation ===
The 270th was begun forming in July 1942, part of the Arkhangelsk Military District. The new division included the same basic order of battle as the previous division, and was not assigned a commander until 11 October, weeks after it had left the Arkhangelsk Military District for the Voronezh Front's 6th Army. In the 6th Army, Colonel Adam Dashkevich became the first division commander. At the end of October, the 973rd Rifle and 810th Artillery Regiments took up defensive positions at the junction of the 6th Army with the 40th Army in the Osinovka area on the left bank of the Don River 35 kilometers south of Voronezh. On 18 November, when it completed its formation, the remainder of the 270th moved up to defend positions on the left bank of the Don. Four days later, Dashkevich was relieved of command for "negligence in leadership". The division defended positions along the Don River at Babki, Donskoye, Pavlovsk, Russkaya, Kazinka, Nizhny Karabut, and Verkhny Mamon.

On 20 December, Lieutenant Colonel Nikolai Polyatkov became the division commander. At the end of 1942, the 270th became part of the 18th Separate Rifle Corps. From 18 January, the division fought in the Ostrogozhsk–Rossosh Offensive, capturing Novy Oskol. At the beginning of February, the corps became the 69th Army. The 270th fought in Operation Star, the advance on Kharkov, entering Kharkov Oblast on 3 February. On 9 February, it captured Volchansk and developed the attack towards the city. The 270th participated in the capture of Kharkov on 16 February and began advancing on Bogodukhov. The division fought in the Third Battle of Kharkov, advancing on Poltava, and Colonel Ivan Belyayev took command on 26 February, replacing Polyatkov. In early March, the 270th was thrown back by the German counterattack and retreated to Bogodukhov, from which it covered the 69th Army's retreat. After retreating from Bogodukhov, the division held Zolochiv for three days, then defended in the area of Mikoyanovka. At the end of March, it was withdrawn to the Reserve of the Supreme High Command (RVGK).

In July, the division was moved north in the RVGK and became part of the 6th Guards Army on 6 July, fighting in the Battle of Kursk and on the outskirts of Belgorod during the Belgorod-Khar'kov Offensive Operation. On 27 July, the 270th was withdrawn to the RVGK and transferred to the Kalinin Front in the Nelidovo area. At the end of August, it became part of the front's 43rd Army, remaining there until February 1944. In September 1943, the division fought in the Smolensk Operation and the Dukhovshchina-Demidov Offensive. On 22 September, it was awarded the honorific "Demidov" for its actions in the recapture of that town.

In the fall, the division advanced westwards into Belarus, fighting northeast of Vitebsk from October. On 25 October, Belyayev was wounded and temporarily replaced by Colonel Tikhon Yegoshin until 28 November. On 14 February, the division transferred back to the RVGK and became part of the 103rd Rifle Corps. In early June, it was relocated to the Novokhovansk area south of Nevel. On 12 June, the division and its corps joined the 6th Guards Army of the 1st Baltic Front just before Operation Bagration began in late June. The division participated in the Vitebsk–Orsha Offensive and the Polotsk Offensive in June and July. For its actions in the capture of Polotsk, the division was awarded the Order of the Red Banner on 23 July. Continuing the offensive, the 270th advanced into Latvia, fighting in the Rezhitsa–Dvinsk Offensive, the Šiauliai Offensive, the Baltic Offensive, the Riga Offensive, and the Battle of Memel from July to November.

In December, the division began blockading German troops trapped in the Courland Pocket on the Baltic coast. On 12 February 1945, the division was transferred to the 22nd Guards Rifle Corps of the 10th Guards Army, part of the 2nd Baltic Front. A month later it shifted to the 6th Guards Army's 84th Rifle Corps. On 17 April, the corps transferred to the 4th Shock Army, still in the Courland Group of Forces, defending positions southeast of Libau until the end of the war. The division's honorifics at the end of the war were "Demidov Red Banner".

=== Postwar ===
After the end of the war, the division was relocated to Buzuluk and Totskoye with the 84th Rifle Corps in the South Ural Military District, where it became the 41st Rifle Brigade in 1946. In October 1953, the 41st Rifle Brigade was expanded into the 270th Rifle Division. In September 1954, the division participated in the Totskoye range nuclear tests and exercises as the defending side. In the spring of 1955, the 270th Rifle Division was renamed the 44th Rifle Division at Uralsk. On 4 June 1957, it was converted into the 44th Motor Rifle Division. When the district was disbanded in January 1958, the 44th transferred to the Turkestan Military District, and was disbanded on 1 March 1959.

== Commanders ==
The division's first formation was led by the following officer:

- Colonel (promoted to Major General 27 March 1942) Zaki Kutlin (10 July 1941–killed 25 May 1942)

The division's second formation was commanded by the following officers:

- Colonel Adam Dashkevich (11 October–19 December 1942)
- Lieutenant Colonel (promoted to Colonel 14 February 1943) Nikolai Polyatkov (20 December 1942–20 February 1943)
- Colonel Ivan Belyayev (26 February–wounded 28 October 1943)
- Colonel Tikhon Yegoshin (29 October–28 November 1943)
- Colonel (promoted to Major General 3 June 1944) Ivan Belyayev (29 November 1943–9 May 1945)
