= 317th Rifle Division =

- Active: 1941–1946
- Country: Soviet Union
- Branch: Red Army
- Type: Infantry
- Size: Division
- Engagements: Battle of Rostov (1941); Mius-Front; Barvenkovo–Lozovaya Offensive Operation; Second Battle of Kharkov; Battle of the Caucasus; Taman Peninsula; Siege of Budapesht; Manchurian Operation
- Decorations: Order of the Red Banner (2nd Formation)
- Battle honours: Budapesht (2nd Formation)

Commanders
- Notable commanders: Col. Ivan Vladimirovich Seredkin; Col. Yakov Mikhailovich Semizorov; Col. Dmitrii Pavlovich Yakovlev; Col. Nikolai Aleksandrovich Shvarev; Col. Ivan Fedorovich Romashchenko; Col. Boris Vladimirovich Gushchin; Col. Mikhail Ignatovich Dobrovolskii

The 317th Rifle Division was an infantry division of the Red Army. It was formed in July, 1941, in the Transcaucasus Military District, as a standard rifle division. It was designated as an "Azerbaidzhani National" ethnic division, based on Azeri reservists, and may have carried the honorific name "Baku" (Russian: Бакинская). This first formation distinguished itself during the first liberation of Rostov in November, but was trapped and effectively destroyed in the Izyum Salient in May, 1942. A second division began forming, also in the vicinity of Baku, in the summer of that year and served in the offensives that drove the Axis forces out of the Caucasus. Following this, the division was transferred to Ukraine, eventually making its way into the Balkans and winning an honorific for its role in the siege of Budapest. In the final weeks of the war against Germany, the 317th was alerted for a major transfer to the Far East, where it was present for the Soviet invasion of Manchuria in August, 1945, although it seems to have seen little if any combat in that brief campaign.

== 1st Formation ==
The division started forming for the first time on July 25, 1941, in the Transcaucasus Military District. at Baku. Its basic order of battle was as follows:

- 571st Rifle Regiment
- 606th Rifle Regiment
- 761st Rifle Regiment
- 773rd Artillery Regiment

Col. Ivan Vladimirovich Seredkin was appointed to command on the day it began forming; he would remain in command until December 29. Many of the men were Azerbaijanis, and about 30 percent were regular troops (22-24 years old) while the rest were reservists (25-37 years old). The division remained in the Caucasus, well away from the fighting, until October, when it was assigned to the 56th Army, then forming south of Rostov-na-Donu. In this army it took part in the counteroffensive that drove Army Group South out of that city. During this fighting, the junior political officer (politruk) of the regimental battery of the 606th Rifle Regiment, Sergey Vasilevich Vavilov, distinguished himself while directing the fire of the battery's 76mm guns, knocking out 22 German armored vehicles and earning a posthumous award as a Hero of the Soviet Union

In December the division was transferred to 9th Army, in Southern Front. At the end of the month Colonel Seredkin was replaced by Col. Yakov Mikhailovich Semizorov. The division took part in the winter counter-offensive which led to the creation of the Izium salient south of Kharkov. In February, the 317th was reassigned to Lt. Gen. Podlas's 57th Army, still in Southern Front and still deep inside the salient. On March 3 the command was handed over to Col. Dmitrii Pavlovich Yakovlev. He would hold this position for the rest of the 1st Formation.

=== Second Battle of Kharkov ===
When Southwestern Front launched its offensive on Kharkov on May 11, Southern Front's forces were not directly involved, but the salient was the staging ground from which Southwestern Front was launching its attack to the north. 57th Army was holding a front of 80km with four divisions, including the 317th, in the first line with 14th Guards Rifle Division in reserve. The divisions averaged a strength of 6,000 to 7,000 men. The 317th was in the right-center sector of the Army's front between 150th and 99th Rifle Divisions and mostly facing the German 298th Infantry Division. Over the coming days Army Group South staged a buildup of forces south of the salient, and on May 17, 9th Army (due east of the division) came under attack from the German III Motorized and XXXXIV Army Corps.

On the first day of the German counteroffensive, 9th Army's front was deeply penetrated. Units on the right flank and in the center of 57th Army remained in their positions, while at the boundary with 9th Army the 351st Rifle Division turned its flank to the north as withdrawing subunits of 9th Army's 341st Rifle Division defended its left flank. A breach 20km wide had been torn in the defenses between the two armies. The next day, Podlas was killed in action, and his army became leaderless during this crisis. As late as the 19th the 317th still held its initial line while the battle raged many kilometres to the east. It was then that the Soviet high command grasped reality and ordered the remaining divisions of the 57th Army to reverse front and begin moving back towards Lozovaia. This was underway on the 20th and 21st, and while the 317th managed to escape the immediate threat near that town, it made little difference because the large salient had been encircled and was firmly cordoned off by the 23rd. The division reached the western face of this cordon in reasonable shape on May 24 and formed a shock group with the 150th and 393rd Rifle Divisions, plus the remnants of two cavalry divisions and several tank units:

"On the morning of May 26, our forces renewed their attempts to break out of the encirclement. Col. Chanyshev's 103rd Rifle Division and the remnants of Maj. Gen. Yegorov's 150th and Col. Yakovlev's 317th Rifle Divisions with a tank group from General Pushkin's 23rd Tank Corps were employed as the first echelon of the shock force. However, these attempts were unsuccessful, and Yegorov perished."

By these means the division was able to filter some men out of the pocket, but the division's command staff and organization disintegrated in the process, and on the 30th the unit was officially disbanded.

== 2nd Formation ==
A new division began forming from July to August 2, 1942, at Makhachkala in the North Caucasus Military District. Its order of battle remained the same as that of the first formation. Col. Nikolai Aleksandrovich Shvarev was appointed to command on the latter date. With German panzers driving towards the Prokhladnyi and Mozdok regions, Stavka ordered the formation of a new 24th Army to defend the Makhachkala region. The 317th was assigned to this new Army, but on August 28 the order was countermanded, re-designating the new Army as the 58th.

As German Army Group A continued its drive to capture the Caucasian oil fields, on September 29, Lt. Gen. I.I. Maslennikov, commander of the Transcaucasus Front's Northern Group of Forces, received orders for defense of the region from Stavka, including the following:

"...5. For the immediate defense of the city of Groznyi, besides the NKVD Division, occupy the Groznyi defensive line with the 317th Rifle Division..."

By October 23 the division was in 44th Army. It appeared to Maslennikov that, although the Germans had taken Mozdok and some territory to its south, they were a spent force and he was proposing a counterattack with a group that would include the 317th. In the event this was forestalled two days later when the "spent" Germans launched a renewed drive to the southwest and then to the east; this attack was halted at the gates of Ordzhonikidze on November 5, at which time the division was serving in 9th Army.

At the end of the year the 317th went back into 58th Army, now part of the North Caucasus Front. In April, 1943, it was moved to the 56th Army in the same Front, where it served throughout the fighting to liberate the Taman Peninsula until September, when the Germans evacuated to Crimea. During this time Colonel Shvarev made way for Maj. Gen. Anatoly Petrakovsky on June 16, but this officer held the post for less than a month, eventually being replaced by Col. Ivan Fedorovich Romashchenko on August 18. In August and September the division was assigned to 22nd Rifle Corps, and it remained there when the corps was transferred to 18th Army in 1st Ukrainian Front.

== Into the Balkans ==
In August, 1944, the 317th went into the reserves of 4th Ukrainian Front, and in the following month was assigned to the 18th Guards Rifle Corps, back in the 18th Army, but this time under 4th Ukrainian Front command. In November the 18th Guards was reassigned to the reserves of 2nd Ukrainian Front, and the division took part in the Siege of Budapesht, being awarded for its services on November 14 with the Order of the Red Banner for "exemplary fulfillment of command tasks" and its "valor and courage". Col. Boris Vladimirovich Gushchin took command of the division on December 19. At the conclusion of the siege the division was one of many formations of 2nd and 3rd Ukrainian Fronts given the name of the city as an honorific:

"BUDAPESHT" - ...317th Rifle Division (Colonel Gushchin, Boris Vladimirovich)... The troops who participated in the battles for the conquest of Budapesht, by the order of the Supreme High Command of 13 February 1945, and a commendation in Moscow, are given a salute 24 artillery salvoes from 324 guns. By decree of the Presidium of the Supreme Soviet of the USSR on June 9, 1945, the medal "For the Capture of Budapesht" was established.

In March, 1945, the 18th Guards Corps was transferred once again, now to 46th Army. On April 14, Col. Mikhail Ignatovich Dobrovolsky took command of the division from Colonel Gushchin, and he would hold it for the duration of the war. In the last weeks of the war in Europe, the 317th and its Corps were finally transferred to the 53rd Army in 2nd Ukrainian Front, which was alerted for transfer to the Far East, to prepare for the Manchurian Campaign.

== Manchurian Campaign and Postwar ==
By August 1 the 317th was a separate division in the reserves of the Transbaikal Front in Mongolia. It remained in reserve during the offensive, and did not see any significant combat action. By the conclusion of hostilities, the division had been awarded the full title of 317th Rifle, Budapesht, Order of the Red Banner Division (Russian: 317-я стрелковая Будапештская Краснознамённая дивизия). The division was based in Achinsk with the 49th Rifle Corps, and was disbanded there in 1946.
