= 339th Rifle Division =

339th Rifle Division (August 29, 1941 – May 29, 1945)
- Active: 1941–1945
- Country: Soviet Union
- Branch: Red Army
- Type: Infantry
- Size: Division
- Engagements: Battle of Rostov (1941); Case Blue; Battle of the Caucasus; Novorossiysk-Taman Operation; Kerch–Eltigen Operation; Crimean Offensive; Vistula-Oder Offensive; Battle of Berlin
- Decorations: Order of the Red Banner; Order of Suvorov 2nd class
- Battle honours: Rostov; Taman; Brandenburg

Commanders
- Notable commanders: Col. Aleksandr Mikhailovich Pykhtin; Col. Pavel Ivanovich Morozov; Maj. Gen. Teodor Sergeevich Kulakov; Col. Grigorii Mironovich Pustovit; Maj. Gen. Gavril Tarasovich Vasilenko

The 339th Rifle Division was first formed in late August, 1941, as a standard Red Army rifle division, at Rostov-on-Don. As it was formed in part from reservists and cadre that included members of the Communist Party from that city, it carried the honorific title "Rostov" for the duration. In late November it was part of the force that counterattacked the German 1st Panzer Army in the Battle of Rostov and forced its retreat from the city, one of the first major setbacks for the invaders. During 1942 the division was forced to retreat into the Caucasus, where it fought to defend the passes leading to the Black Sea ports. In 1943 it fought to liberate the Taman Peninsula, and then in early 1944 to also liberate Crimea. In the following months the division was reassigned to the 1st Belorussian Front, with which it took part in the Battle of Berlin in 1945. Following a distinguished career, the division was disbanded in the summer of that year.

== Formation ==
The division began forming on August 29, 1941, at Rostov in the North Caucasus Military District. Its primary order of battle was as follows:

- 1133rd Rifle Regiment
- 1135th Rifle Regiment
- 1137th Rifle Regiment
- 900th Artillery Regiment

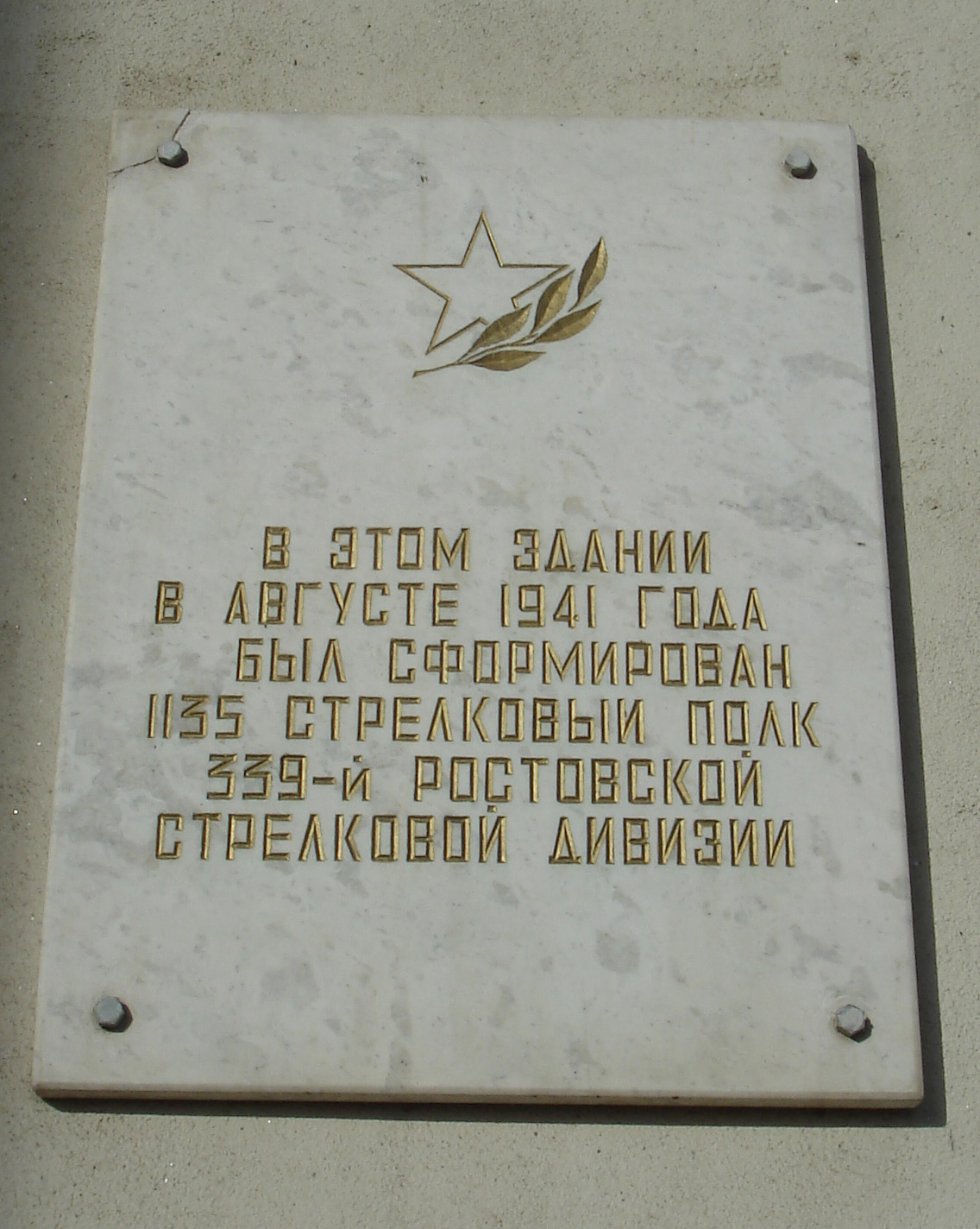
Memorial plaque to the 1135th Rifle Regiment in Rostov-on-Don

Col. Aleksandr Mikhailovich Pykhtin took command of the division on the day it began forming, a position he would hold until December 15. On October 12, while still barely formed, the division was sent to the front in the Taganrog Group, and about a week later was assigned to the 9th Army in Southern Front. Not surprisingly, the division saw its first action in the Battle of Rostov, first in the Donbass-Rostov Strategic Defensive Operation and later, after being transferred to the 37th Army, in the Rostov Strategic Offensive Operation. During the latter the 339th played a role in the counterattack, beginning on November 27, that deeply outflanked 1st Panzer Army's positions in Rostov, eventually forcing it back to the Mius River line and, incidentally, costing Field Marshal Gerd von Rundstedt his job as commander of Army Group South.

On December 16, Colonel Pykhtin was succeeded in command by Col. Pavel Ivanovich Morozov. In January, 1942, the division was transferred to 56th Army, still in Southern Front. It remained in this Army and Front, facing the Axis forces along the Mius until the beginning of July, when their summer offensive began on this sector of the front. 56th Army was on the southernmost sector, down to the coast of the Sea of Azov, and the 339th was deployed in first echelon with the 30th and 31st Rifle Divisions. 1st Panzer and 17th Armies began their attack on July 7 and by the 16th the Front commander, Lt. Gen. Rodion Malinovsky, was authorized by the STAVKA to order his armies to begin an orderly withdrawal to the Don River south of Rostov over five nights, protected by strong rearguards. Late on the 20th, LVII Panzer Corps had crossed the Mius and was driving the rearguards of 56th Army back towards the city. In the following days the 339th, along with its companion divisions and 16th Rifle Brigade, was ordered to defend its namesake city by the Army commander, Maj. Gen. Viktor Tsyganov, by manning the outer and inner defensive belts on the northern and eastern sectors. These plans were undone by the rapid advance of the German tank forces and the premature withdrawal of 18th Army south of the Don. 56th Army was forced to withdraw as well, and after a bitter defense mainly by NKVD security troops Rostov-on-Don fell to the Germans for the second time on July 27.

== Caucasus and Crimean Campaigns ==
After the fall of Rostov the division retreated into the Caucasus, in the Coastal Operational Group of North Caucasus Front as of August 1. At this time 56th Army had only three rifle divisions, a rifle brigade, and two fortified regions. The first task of the Operational Group was to defend the city of Krasnodar from the advancing forces of German 17th Army. Its V Army Corps broke into the city on August 10, but a spirited defense of the suburb of Pashkovskaya by 30th Rifle allowed most of the defenders to evacuate south of the Kuban River before the bridge was blown up in the Germans' faces, further delaying their advance. In the midst of this, on August 14, the 339th came under the command of Col. Teodor Sergeevich Kulakov.

As of September 4 the division was in Front reserves of Transcaucasus Front, having been transferred from North Caucasus Front when the latter was dissolved. When the German 17th Army began a new offensive towards the Black Sea port of Tuapse on September 23 it was back in 56th Army, now under command of Maj. Gen. Aleksandr Ryzhov, which was deployed in the center of the Black Sea Group of Forces, from Cherkasovskii to Staroobriadcheskii, opposing the 125th Infantry Division, plus elements of Romanian 19th Infantry and 6th Cavalry Divisions. Tuapse was successfully defended, and the 339th was still in 56th Army when the German offensive ground to a halt in early November. At the end of the year the division was moved to 47th Army, still in the Black Sea Group, and moved north with this Army in April, 1943, into the Steppe "Military District" in the Reserve of the Supreme High Command for rebuilding. Leaving the reserves in July, it returned to 56th Army in the revived North Caucasus Front and fought on the Taman Peninsula from August to November under the 16th Rifle Corps. The division's service there was recognized with the honorific "Taman", and it would remain in 16th Corps for the duration.

Almost immediately following the victory at Taman, 18th and 56 Armies launched the Kerch–Eltigen Operation, a set of amphibious assaults from Taman across the Kerch Strait into the Crimea. Over the course of November 6, 7 and 8 all three of the 339th's rifle regiments crossed the icy waters, and on the 9th attacked in the direction of Kolonka and Kerch. After two days of sustained heavy combat the division managed to penetrate the German defenses to reach a line from "unnamed height 1 kilometre south of Height Marker 82.5, Height Marker 5.0, the eastern edge of Kankany and Kolonka, the Voikov metallurgical factory, and the eastern edge of Kerch". At 0100 hours on November 15 the division resumed its assault, with the 227th Rifle Division on its right flank, but again failed to achieve success, losing six men killed and 20 wounded in the process; the division's combat journal described the German defense as "persistent resistance by fire". At 1325 hours on November 16 the German air force began a series of heavy strikes against the division's positions, with over 100 Ju 87 and Bf 109 sorties. Colonel Kulakov had established his observation post in the midst of his division's forward defense line in the northern portion of the Voikov factory. At 1330 hours he was killed along with two other officers standing nearby by a bomb blast, with a fourth officer wounded. Unaware of his fate, the People's Commissariat of Defense issued a decree the following day promoting Kulakov to the rank of Major General. On May 16, 1944, Kulakov was posthumously made a Hero of the Soviet Union for his outstanding performance in the Kerch–Eltigen Operation, along with a captain and a sergeant-major of his division who were also killed during its course. Kulakov was buried at Krasnodar. Kulakov was replaced in command of the 339th by Col. Grigorii Mironovich Pustovit.

On November 15 a new Separate Coastal Army was formed from the command elements of North Caucasus Front, and 16th Rifle Corps was assigned to it. The fighting for Kerch would go on into January, 1943. German 17th Army in Crimea had by now been isolated by land, and its fall was a matter of time. Meanwhile, it maintained a persistent defense. On the night of January 22–23, Army commander Col. Gen. Ivan Petrov ordered a coup de main against Kerch, with the Azov Flotilla transporting two naval infantry battalions into the harbor. Although these troops briefly seized part of the port, they were too far apart for mutual support and were gradually destroyed piecemeal. Meanwhile, the 339th made every effort to break through and relieve the naval infantrymen, but was repulsed. Petrov was relieved of command of the Army in February. On March 2, Col. Gavril Tarasovich Vasilenko became commanding officer of the division, a post he would hold for the duration. He was promoted to Major General on April 27, 1945. During April and May the 339th distinguished itself in the liberation of Crimea and was awarded the Order of the Red Banner on April 24 for its role in the liberation of Feodosia.

== Into Germany ==
Following the Crimean campaign the 339th remained in the Reserve of the Supreme High Command, still in Separate Coastal Army, until September, when it was assigned to the 33rd Army, which joined the 1st Belorussian Front in October. The division would remain under these commands for the duration. At the start of the Vistula-Oder Offensive 33rd Army was in the Puławy bridgehead over the Vistula, and attacked from there on January 12, 1945, when the offensive opened. The advance brought the forces of 33rd Army to the Oder River near the confluence with the Bober by February 15. At the outset of the Battle of Berlin 33rd Army was part of its Front's left shock group, and the division was part of 16th Rifle Corps with the 323rd and 383rd Rifle Divisions. The Corps was one of three in the Army's first echelon, and the 339th was in the first echelon of its Corps. On April 16, the first day of the offensive, 16th Corps advanced over wooded and swampy terrain to a depth of 4 – 6 km and by the end of the day had reached the line of the railway bridge 2 km southeast of Frankfurt-on-Oder. On April 18 the advance was limited to one kilometre, due to the commitment of German reserves, and reached the line of Frankfurter-Hoe – Markendorf. The picture changed by the 21st, as 16th Corps continued attacking to the northwest and completed the breakthrough of the main German defensive zone, reaching as far as the Oder–Spree Canal. the 339th would win its final battle honor, Brandenburg, on May 1.

== Postwar ==
The soldiers of the division ended the war with the official title of 339th Rifle, Rostov-Taman, Brandenburg, Order of the Red Banner, Order of Suvorov Division (Russian: 339-я стрелковая Ростовско-Таманская Бранденбургская Краснознамённая ордена Суворова дивизия), and five men had been decorated as Heroes of the Soviet Union. According to STAVKA Order No. 11095 of May 29, 1945, part 6, the 339th is listed as one of the rifle divisions to be "disbanded in place". It was disbanded in Germany in accordance with the directive during the summer of 1945.
