= Ivan Zinoviev =

Red Army colonel

Ivan Dmitrievich Zinoviev
- Native name: Иван Дмитриевич Зиновьев
- Born: 17 January 1905; Dubovka village, Bugulminsky Uyezd, Samara Governorate, Russian Empire
- Died: 1942 (aged 36–37) Norway
- Allegiance: Soviet Union
- Branch: Border Troops; Red Army
- Service years: 1927–1942
- Rank: Colonel
- Commands: 393rd Rifle Division
- Conflicts: World War II; Winter War; Eastern Front; Second Battle of Kharkov
- Awards: Hero of the Soviet Union; Order of Lenin; Order of the Red Banner (2x)

Ivan Dmitrievich Zinoviev (Russian: Иван Дмитриевич Зиновьев; 17 January 1905 – 1942) was a Red Army colonel and Hero of the Soviet Union. Zinoviev began his military service with the OGPU Border Troops and fought against the Basmachi. He was awarded the title Hero of the Soviet Union and the Order of Lenin for his leadership of a border post during the Winter War. After Operation Barbarossa, Zinoviev became commander of the 393rd Rifle Division and led the division during the Barvenkovo-Lozovaya Operation but was captured and seriously wounded during the Second Battle of Kharkov. Zinoviev was sent to a concentration camp in Germany, then transferred to another camp in Norway, where he tried to escape and was shot.

== Early life ==
Zinoviev was born on 17 January 1905 in the village of Dubovka in Samara Governorate to a peasant family of eleven children. He graduated from five grades and worked on a farm.

== Military service ==
In 1927, Zinoviev was drafted into the OGPU Border Troops. He was assigned to the 47th Border Guard Detachment of the Central Asian Border District. In 1928, he graduated from the school of junior commanders and became a squad leader. Zinoviev fought in actions against the Basmachi. In 1931, he joined the Communist Party of the Soviet Union. In November 1931, he was seriously wounded while fighting against a large group of Basmachi and was awarded the Order of the Red Banner. In 1932, he became a platoon commander. Zinoviev graduated from mid-level commanders refresher courses at the Kharkov School of Border Troops in 1934. He was appointed chief of staff of the Border Commandant's office in the Turkmen Soviet Socialist Republic. In 1939, he graduated from the Higher School of the Border Troops.

=== Winter War ===
Along with other graduates of the school, Zinoviev was sent to the front in the Winter War. He became a company commander in the 4th NKVD Border Troops Regiment. The company under his command was tasked with supply line protection in the village of Uoma. From 15 December 1939, the border troops conducted continuous fighting with Finnish partisans and repulsed several attempts to destroy the outpost. On 10 January 1940, Zinoviev's company was surrounded by two Finnish battalions. Although wounded, he continued to lead the defence. For about a month, the company repulsed fierce Finnish attacks. By this time, only 32 out of 132 Border Troops were still in fighting condition, as the rest were either dead, seriously injured or frostbitten. Zinoviev himself had been wounded twice. On the night of 11–12 February, he led a counterattack that broke through the encirclement and extricated the company. On 26 April, Zinoviev was awarded the title Hero of the Soviet Union and the Order of Lenin for his reported "courage and heroism".

=== World War II ===
Zinoviev was sent to the Frunze Military Academy but managed to finish only one course. While at the academy, he wrote a book about his experiences in the Winter War, which was published by Voenizdat in 1941. With the outbreak of war with Germany, he was appointed commander of the 6th Army's 393rd Rifle Division. Zinoviev led the division during defensive battles along the Siversky Donets in fall 1941. During the Barvenkovo-Lozovaya Operation in January 1942, the division reportedly captured 174 settlements. He was awarded a second Order of the Red Banner on 27 March for his leadership during the offensive. In May 1942, the division fought in the Second Battle of Kharkov. Along with the 6th Army, the 393rd was surrounded in the Izyum Pocket and destroyed. Zinoviev was seriously wounded on 29 May and taken prisoner by German troops. He was sent to a concentration camp in Germany but was transferred to a camp in Norway. Zinoviev was shot by the Germans for planning an escape from the camp.
