= 393rd Rifle Division =

393rd Rifle Division (1 October 1941 – 30 June 1942) 393rd Rifle Division (22 November 1944 – 1946)
- Active: 1941 - 1946
- Country: Soviet Union
- Branch: Red Army
- Type: Division
- Role: Infantry
- Engagements: Barvenkovo–Lozovaya Offensive; Second Battle of Kharkov; Soviet invasion of Manchuria
- Decorations: Order of the Red Banner (2nd Formation)

Commanders
- Notable commanders: Col. Ivan Zinoviev; Col. Filipp Anisimovich Isakov

The 393rd Rifle Division was raised in 1941 as an infantry division of the Red Army, and fought against the German invasion Operation Barbarossa. In its first formation the division followed a very similar combat path to that of the 411th Rifle Division. It was first formed on 1 October in the Kharkov Military District, probably on the basis of militia units that had been raised there. It fought in the Barvenkovo–Lozovaya Offensive that created the Izium - Barvenkovo salient in January 1942 and was intended to play a leading role in a spring offensive aimed at the liberation of Kharkov. In the event a German counteroffensive cut off the salient; the division was deeply encircled and destroyed. In the buildup to the Soviet invasion of Manchuria a new 393rd was formed in the Far Eastern Front in late 1944. The new division fought into the northern part of the Korean peninsula, taking many ports and cities with enough distinction that it was awarded the Order of the Red Banner, and continued to serve briefly into the postwar period.

== 1st Formation ==
The 393rd began forming on 1 October 1941, at Sviatogorsk in the Kharkov Military District, Its order of battle, based on the first wartime shtat (table of organization and equipment) for rifle divisions, was as follows:

- 697th Rifle Regiment
- 699th Rifle Regiment
- 704th Rifle Regiment
- 967th Artillery Regiment
- 51st Antitank Battalion
- 420th Antiaircraft Battery (later 691st Antiaircraft Battalion)
- 545th Mortar Battalion
- 466th Reconnaissance Company
- 685th Sapper Battalion
- 855th Signal Battalion
- 489th Medical/Sanitation Battalion
- 482nd Chemical Protection (Anti-gas) Company
- 305th Motor Transport Company
- 258th Field Bakery
- 828th Divisional Veterinary Hospital
- 1415th Field Postal Station
- 762nd Field Office of the State Bank

From 14 October to 9 December Lt. Col. Aleksandr Vasilevich Mukhin served as the division's military commissar. In what Sharp describes as a "minor mystery" the Commanders of Corps and Divisions in the Great Patriotic War (see Bibliography) does not name a commander for the division prior to Col. Ivan Dmitrievich Zinovev on 15 April 1942, but he would remain in command for the remainder of the existence of this formation.

=== Winter Offensive and Battle of Kharkov ===
By the beginning of November the 393rd has been assigned to the 6th Army in Southwestern Front. When the Barvenkovo–Lozovaya Offensive began on 18 January 1942, the division was in this Army's first echelon, and helped lead an advance of 90 - 100km by the end of the month. By 1 April it was still under those commands, helping to defend the northern part of the Barvenkovo bridgehead along a 135km front from Balakleia to Samoilovka. In preparation for the spring offensive to defeat the German Kharkov grouping and liberate the area the division was re-subordinated to Army Group Bobkin, which was under the command of Maj. Gen. L. V. Bobkin. This consisted of the 393rd and 270th Rifle Divisions, 7th Tank Brigade and 6th Cavalry Corps. The Group was to penetrate the German defense in the 10km sector from Koshparovka to Kiptivka with the immediate mission of capturing the line from Dmitrovka to Seredovka to cover the 6th Cavalry as it entered the penetration. It was then to exploit to the west and southwest, with the ultimate objective of Krasnograd.

By the end of 11 May the forces of Southwestern Front had taken up jumping-off positions for the offensive. The 393rd and one regiment of the 270th were concentrated in the Koshparovka - Kiptivka sector to prepare the penetration, very far west into the salient. The attack began at 0730 hours on 12 May after a 60-minute artillery preparation. Due to coordination issues between Southwestern and Southern Fronts Group Bobkin did not receive any air support. Despite this the 393rd penetrated the German defenses, held by elements of the 454th Security Division, to a depth of 4 - 6km during the morning, allowing Bobkin to commit his cavalry and tanks in the afternoon. By the end of the day the southern shock group of Southwestern Front had shattered German resistance along a 42km front and advanced 12 - 15km. On the following day the full depth of the German defenses were penetrated on the Krasnograd axis, the penetration had been widened to 50km, and the rifle divisions advanced another 16km while 6th Cavalry gained 20km.

During 14 May the 393rd and 270th Divisions captured positions from Kokhanovka to Ulianovka, and also closed in on Kegichevka. By the end of the day the depth of the penetration reached from 25 - 40km. However, 6th Army's second echelon was lagging behind. Kegichevka was taken by the 697th Rifle Regiment on the 15th while the rest of the division advanced on both sides of the Bogataia River south of there. By the end of 16 May the 6th Cavalry had partly encircled Krasnograd but was hindered from taking the town by the shortage of support forces; meanwhile the 393rd had captured a line from Shkavrovoto to Mozharka. Ominously, however, German panzer forces were gathering well to the east, facing the positions of 9th Army on the Barvenkovo sector.

The German counteroffensive began on the morning of 17 May and immediately made gains into the positions of 9th Army and the left flank of 57th Army. As this was happening the 21st and 23rd Tank Brigades of 6th Army were still advancing to the west, while Group Bobkin was becoming bogged down in the fighting for Krasnograd. On the 18th, as the 699th Rifle Regiment was shifted northwest towards that town as part of the ongoing Soviet offensive, 9th Army was being routed, and 1st Panzer Army had nearly covered half the ground necessary to cut off the salient. On the afternoon of 19 May Stalin finally authorized a suspension of the offensive; a new Army Group Kostenko was formed to include all the forces of the former Group Bobkin plus three additional rifle divisions and two tank brigades with the objective of counterattacking the advancing German forces by late on the 21st or early on the 22nd.

On 21 May the 393rd began pulling back towards Kegichevka, but with the 6th Cavalry retreating at a faster pace it was by now the westernmost Soviet unit in the salient. During the next day the 1st Panzer Army renewed its offensive and by evening had linked up with the 44th Infantry Division of German 6th Army near Balakleia, sealing the pocket. On the 23rd a mixed force of Romanian and German units struck at the boundary between the division and the 266th Rifle Division but the attack was held off even as both divisions retreated. On 24 May the 393rd's withdrawal accelerated as it was needed for the breakout attempt. It was added to a shock group consisting of the 317th and 150th Rifle Divisions, 49th and 26th Cavalry Divisions, three tank brigades and the remnants of two tank corps.

The breakout was intended to start at dawn on 25 May but in the event did not get underway until 1000 hours, and remained disorganized throughout the day. The 393rd was still moving up to its concentration point at Novo-Ukrainka. On the next two days the division was shifted northward toward Mikhailovka but made no progress against the 3rd and 23rd Panzer Divisions. Over the 28th and 29th, apart from the 266th which withdrew in some order, only individuals and small groups were able to escape from the pocket, about 22,000 in total. General Bobkin was killed in one of these breakout attempts. Colonel Zinovev is listed as commander of what was left of the division until it was disbanded, which took place on 30 June.

== 2nd Formation ==
After an absence of more than two years from the Red Army order of battle, much like the 386th and 388th Rifle Divisions, a new 393rd was formed on 22 November 1944, in the 25th Army of the Far Eastern Front. It was formed on the basis of the 175th and 1407th separate Rifle Regiments and had an entirely different order of battle from the 1st formation:

- 505th Rifle Regiment
- 541st Rifle Regiment
- 621st Rifle Regiment
- 519th Artillery Regiment
- 463rd Self-Propelled Gun Battalion
- 438th Antitank Battalion
- 144th Reconnaissance Company
- 251st Sapper Battalion
- 1037th Signal Company
- 351st Medical/Sanitation Battalion
- 276th Chemical Protection (Anti-gas) Company
- 623rd Motor Transport Company
- 588th Field Bakery
- 462nd Divisional Veterinary Hospital
- 3151st Field Postal Station
- 2006th Field Office of the State Bank

Col. Filipp Anisimovich Isakov was appointed to command on the day the division re-formed, and remained in command for the duration. For most of 1945 it was assigned to the 88th Rifle Corps.

=== Invasion of Manchuria ===
When the Manchurian operation began on 9 August the 393rd was a separate division located on the extreme southern flank of 25th Army, which was now part of the 1st Far Eastern Front. That day the 108th and 113th Fortified Regions captured Japanese positions across the Hunchun and Tumen rivers, securing a bridgehead over the Tumen at Kyonghung, north of the old 1938 battlefield at Lake Khasan. On the 11th the division, less the 541st Rifle Regiment, reinforced the 113th, fighting along the northeast coast of Korea. Early the next morning the 393rd conducted a motorized attack through the lines of the 113th against the Japanese 101st Separate Infantry Regiment south of Chonghak, which withdrew westward. Within hours, at 0900, the division's forward detachment assisted a naval task force in securing the port of Unggi. It left one battalion as a garrison there and continued to the port of Najin, which it occupied on 14 August. Active operations in Korea ended two days later as the division was securing a mountain pass 12km north of Chongjin before advancing into the city at 1500 hours, linking up with the 355th Rifle Division which had been landed there by sea.

On 23 August the 393rd was officially recognized for its role in the taking of Nanam, Najin, Unggi and Chongjin. On 19 September the division was further recognized for its service in the campaign with the award of the Order of the Red Banner.
