= 33rd Army (Soviet Union) =

- 33-я армия
- Active: July 1941 – August 1945
- Country: Soviet Union
- Branch: Red Army
- Type: Combined arms
- Size: Field Army
- Part of: Western Front; Reserve Front; 2nd Belorussian Front; 3rd Belorussian Front; 1st Belorussian Front
- Engagements: World War II; Battle of Moscow; Rzhev-Vyazma Operation; Battle of Smolensk; Battle of Lenino; Operation Bagration; Warsaw-Poznan Offensive; Battle of Berlin

The 33rd Army (Russian: 33-я армия) was a Soviet field army during the Second World War. It was disbanded and redesignated HQ Smolensk Military District in 1945.

== Initial Operations ==
It was initially formed in the Moscow Military District in July 1941, consisting of the 1st, 5th, 9th, 17th, and 21st Moscow People's Militia divisions, plus artillery and other support units. It conducted defensive operations as a part of the Mozhaisk Defence Line and the Soviet Reserve Front.

It was stationed at Naro-Fominsk under Lieutenant General Mikhail Yefremov in October 1941 when the town was captured by invading German forces.

With the arrival of the German 2nd Panzer Army at Kashira and its 4th Panzer Group at the Moskva-Volga Canal, the conditions for the German capture of Moscow were created. On 1 December 1941, the Germans attacked the centre of the Soviet front, just west of Moscow. Two German divisions with 70 tanks broke through 33rd Army's sector in the 222nd Rifle Division's area to the north of Naro-Fominsk. On December 2, in the second half of the day, in the 110th Rifle Division's sector, the Wehrmacht continued its offensive and attacked in the direction of Mogutovo. At 16:00, the 113th Rifle Division, together with a regiment from 43rd Army led a counteroffensive on Klotovo and Kamenskoe with the task of hitting the rear of the German attackers to help relieve pressure on the 110th Rifle Division. As a result of this counterstroke, the opponent was routed, and the Soviets captured 47 tanks and about 50 guns. From the west at Naro-Fominsk, the Germans advanced on Kubinka along the Minsk-Moscow highway, and then on Golitcin and Aprelevka, threatening the rear elements of 33rd Army and 5th Army. At the village of Akulovo German forces encountered the 32nd Rifle Division and were met with artillery fire.

When the 33rd Army was surrounded in 1942, Lieutenant General Yefremov committed suicide in order to avoid being captured. Following Yefremov's death, General Kirill Meretskov took command in May 1942.

== Battle of Smolensk 1943 ==
At the Battle of Smolensk (1943), on 7 August 1943, 33rd Army launched an offensive at 6:30 a.m., intended to break through German lines and push toward Roslavl, following a preliminary bombardment at 4:40 a.m. This offensive followed a day of probing attacks that were meant to determine whether the Germans would choose to withdraw from their first set of trenches or not if they were attacked. Three armies (5th Army, 10th Guards Army and 33rd Army, now under General Vasily Gordov) were committed to the offensive, under the command of the Western Front.

However, the attack encountered heavy opposition and quickly stalled. German troops attempted numerous counterattacks from their well-prepared defense positions, supported by tanks, assault guns, and heavy guns and mortars. As Konstantin Rokossovsky recalls, "we literally had to tear ourselves through German lines, one by one". On the first day, the Soviet troops advanced only 4 kilometres (2.5 mi), with all available troops (including artillery, communications troops and engineers) committed to the attack.

== 1944–45 ==
Starting in April 1944, 33rd Army, under General Lieutenant Vasily Kryuchenkin, attempted to retake Belarus as part of the 2nd Belorussian Front during Operation Bagration. During the Mogilev Offensive, it successfully crossed the Dniepr and Pronya rivers, and liberated Shklov on 27 June. During the Minsk Offensive, the army, in conjunction with 49th Army and 50th Army, participated in the rout of the encircled Wehrmacht troops east of Minsk. Through the end of July and throughout August 1944, 33rd Army participated in the Kaunas Offensive, during which it cleared the approaches to East Prussia. On September 10, it was released from the reserves and joined the 1st Belorussian Front on October 19 in preparation for the Warsaw-Poznan Offensive.

On 25 December 1944 the Army consisted of the 16th Rifle Corps (89th "Tamanyan" Rifle Division, 339th Rifle Division, 383rd Rifle Division), 38th Rifle Corps (64th Rifle Division, 95th Rifle Division, 323rd Rifle Division), the 62nd Rifle Corps (49th Rifle Division, 222nd Rifle Division, 362nd Rifle Division), the 115th Fortified Region, 5th Artillery Division, and other support formations and units, including the 35th Motor Rifle Brigade, 20th Anti-Tank Artillery Brigade, 25th Guards Mortar Brigade, 305th Guards Mortar Regiment, 56th Guards Mortar Regiment, the 64th Anti-Aircraft Division, the 9th Tank Corps, the 244th and 257th Tank Regiments, and the 360th and 361st Self-Propelled Artillery Regiments.

On 1 May 1945 during the Battle of Berlin, 33rd Army, as part of the 1st Belorussian Front, consisted of the 16th Rifle Corps (323rd, 339th, 383rd Rifle Divisions), 62nd Rifle Corps (95th, 222nd, 362nd Rifle Divisions), 49th Rifle Division, 115th Fortified Region, 119th Fortified Region, and other support formations and units. After the initial Berlin breakthrough, 33rd Army, alongside other armies of the 1st Belorussian and 1st Ukrainian Fronts, helped to rout the surrounded German forces east of Berlin. Military operations for 33rd Army concluded on 6 May, and the Army HQ was redesignated HQ Smolensk Military District in August 1945.

== Commanders ==
The following officers commanded the army:

- Kombrig Dmitry Onuprienko (20 July – 25 October 1941)
- Lieutenant General Mikhail Grigoryevich Yefremov (25 October 1941 — April 1942)
- Army General Kirill Meretskov (4 May — 8 June 1942)
- Lieutenant General Mikhail Khozin (8 June–18 October 1942)
- Lieutenant General Vasily Gordov (promoted to Colonel General 9 September 1943; 18 October 1942–13 March 1944)
- Colonel General Ivan Yefimovich Petrov (13 March — 12 April 1944)
- Lieutenant General Vasily Kryuchenkin (12 April–9 July 1944)
- Lieutenant General Stepan Morozov (9 July–29 September 1944)
- Colonel General Vyacheslav Tsvetayev (29 September 1944–after May 1945)

== Sources and references ==
- Beloborodov, Afanasy, ed. (1963). Военные кадры Советского государства в Великой Отечественной войне 1941 – 1945 гг [Military Leaders of the Soviet State in the Great Patriotic War 1941–1945] (in Russian). Moscow: Voenizdat.
- http://samsv.narod.ru/Arm/a33/arm.html
- I.Zhorov In rear of the enemy near Vyazma, ВИЖ, 1965, № 6.
