= Anatoly Petrakovsky =

Soviet military commander

Anatoly Iosifovich Petrakovsky
- Native name: Анатолий Иосифович Петраковский
- Born: 28 December 1901; Nyzhnya Safronivka village, Kherson Governorate, Russian Empire
- Died: 3 September 1969 (aged 67) Rostov-on-Don, Soviet Union
- Allegiance: Soviet Union
- Branch: Soviet Army
- Service years: 1922–1956
- Rank: Major general
- Commands: 395th Rifle Division; 317th Rifle Division; 57th Rifle Corps
- Conflicts: Winter War; World War II; Battle of Rostov; Battle of Voronezh; Battle of the Caucasus; Battle of the Dnieper; Invasion of South Sakhalin
- Awards: Hero of the Soviet Union; Order of Lenin (2); Order of the Red Banner (3); Order of Suvorov 2nd class; Order of Kutuzov 2nd class

Anatoly Iosifovich Petrakovsky (Russian: Анато́лий Ио́сифович Петрако́вский; 28 December 1901 – 3 September 1969) was a Ukrainian Soviet Army major general and Hero of the Soviet Union. After joining the Red Army in 1922, Petrakovsky became an officer and rose through the ranks. On the eve of the Winter War, he was a battalion commander in the 13th Rifle Division. Petrakovsky was awarded the title Hero of the Soviet Union and the Order of Lenin for his leadership of the battalion. After Operation Barbarossa, he became commander of the 395th Rifle Division. He led the division during the Battle of Rostov and the Battle of Voronezh but was relieved of command due to a "systemic failure to comply with orders". In August 1943, Petrakovsky became commander of the 57th Rifle Corps but lost command of the corps and was sent to hospital to receive treatment for an illness. After graduating from the Military Academy of the General Staff, he was appointed deputy commander of 16th Army and participated in the Invasion of South Sakhalin. Postwar, Petrakovsky served in various staff positions and retired in 1956.

== Early life ==
Petrakovsky was born on 29 December 1901 in the village of Nyzhnya Safronivka in Kherson Governorate to a peasant family. He graduated from six grades.

== Military service ==
In September 1922, Petrakovsky was conscripted into the Red Army by the Voznesensk Military Commissariat and sent to serve in the 3rd Kutaisi Rifle Regiment of the 1st Caucasian Rifle Division of the Separate Caucasian Red Banner Army at Kutaisi as a Red Army man. In October 1923, he was sent to the Vladikavkaz Red Commanders Infantry Courses, from which he graduated in 1924. In April, he became a starshina in the 39th Rifle Regiment of the 13th Rifle Division at Derbent, the former 3rd Kutaisi Rifle Regiment. In September of that year, he was sent to study at the Vladikavkaz Infantry Officer School and upon graduation in September 1927 returned to his old position with the 39th, which had relocated to the stanitsa of Morozovskaya. Transferred to the 37th Rifle Regiment of the division in March 1929, Petrakovsky served successively as a platoon commander, assistant company commander for the political section, company commander, and regimental head of food and fodder supply. In 1932, he joined the Communist Party of the Soviet Union. The 13th was transferred to the Belorussian Military District in October 1936 and from February 1937 Petrakovsky became senior battalion adjutant and then battalion commander in the 37th Regiment.

=== Winter War and World War II ===
Petrakovsky was transferred to become a battalion commander in the 138th Rifle Division's 554th Rifle Regiment. On 11 February 1940, during the Winter War with Finland, his battalion broke through two lines of barbed wire in the area 1.5 kilometers west of Khotinen. The battalion then captured the Finnish trenches and reportedly repulsed five counterattacks. Petrakovsky was promoted to command of the division's 768th Rifle Regiment soon after. On 21 March 1940, he was awarded the title Hero of the Soviet Union and the Order of Lenin for his leadership of the battalion. In July 1940, Petrakovsky was sent to the Frunze Military Academy.

On 20 August 1941, Petrakovsky received the information that he was to command the 395th Rifle Division, then forming at Voroshilovgrad. Bad weather delayed his flight to Kharkov to 22 August. The 395th personnel were originally Donbass coal miners. Petrakovsky finished assembling the division by October. The division fought in the defence of Mariupol and the Battle of Rostov in the subsequent months. On 9 April 1942, he was awarded the Order of the Red Banner. Petrakovsky received the award again on 5 May. During the summer of 1942, the division fought in the Battle of Voronezh. On 21 July, Petrakovsky received a promotion to major general. He was soon relieved of command due to "failure to comply with orders of the commander of the 18th Army".

In August 1942, Petrakovsky became commander of an operational group of the North Caucasian Front. In September, he became deputy commander of the 47th Army. In November, he became commander of the Tuapse Defence Area. During the fall of 1942, Petrakovsky's command helped block the road through the Pyatigorsk Pass. In February 1943, he became the deputy commander of 18th Army and fought in the Krasnodar Offensive. Between June and July, he led the 317th Rifle Division and participated in fighting on the Taman Peninsula. In August 1943, Petrakovsky was appointed commander of the 57th Rifle Corps and fought in the Battle of the Dnieper and the Lower Dnieper Offensive. On 18 January 1944, he was relieved of command due to illness and sent to the hospital. On 19 January, he was awarded the Order of Suvorov 2nd class. After recovery in March, Petrakovsky was put in reserve. In May 1944, he was sent to study at the Military Academy of the General Staff. After graduating in June 1945, he became 16th Army deputy commander. Petrakovsky participated in the Invasion of South Sakhalin in August 1945. On 27 August 1945, he was awarded the Order of Kutuzov 2nd class for his leadership during the invasion.

=== Postwar ===
At the end of 1945, Petrakovsky became the head of the department of Infantry Division commanders refresher courses at Frunze Military Academy. In April 1949, he became the head of the Military Directorate of the Soviet Military Administration in Germany. In March 1950, Petrakovsky became head of the Soviet Control Commission Military Directorate. In January 1951, he became the head of combat and physical training for the Odessa Military District. In May 1952, Petrakovsky became the head of the military department of the Sverdlovsk Law Institute. Petrakovsky retired from the army in November 1956.

== Later life ==
Petrakovsky lived in Rostov-on-Don after his retirement. In October 1968, he became an honorary citizen of Lugansk. He died on 3 September 1969.

== Awards and decorations ==
| Hero of the Soviet Union (21 March 1940) |
| Order of Lenin, twice (21 March 1940, ?) |
| Order of the Red Banner, thrice (5 May 1942, 3 November 1944, ?) |
| Order of Suvorov, 2nd class (22 February 1944) |
| Order of Kutuzov, 2nd class (27 August 1945) |
| Medal "For the Defence of the Caucasus" (1944) |
| Medal "For the Victory over Germany in the Great Patriotic War 1941–1945" (1945) |
| Medal "For the Victory over Japan" (1945) |
| Jubilee Medal "Twenty Years of Victory in the Great Patriotic War 1941-1945" (1965) |
| Jubilee Medal "In Commemoration of the 100th Anniversary of the Birth of Vladimir Ilyich Lenin" (1969) |
| Jubilee Medal "30 Years of the Soviet Army and Navy" (1948) |
| Jubilee Medal "40 Years of the Armed Forces of the USSR" (1958) |
| Jubilee Medal "50 Years of the Armed Forces of the USSR" (1968) |
