= Tugulym =

Urban-type settlement in Sverdlovsk Oblast, Russia

Tugulym Тугулым
- Urban-type settlement
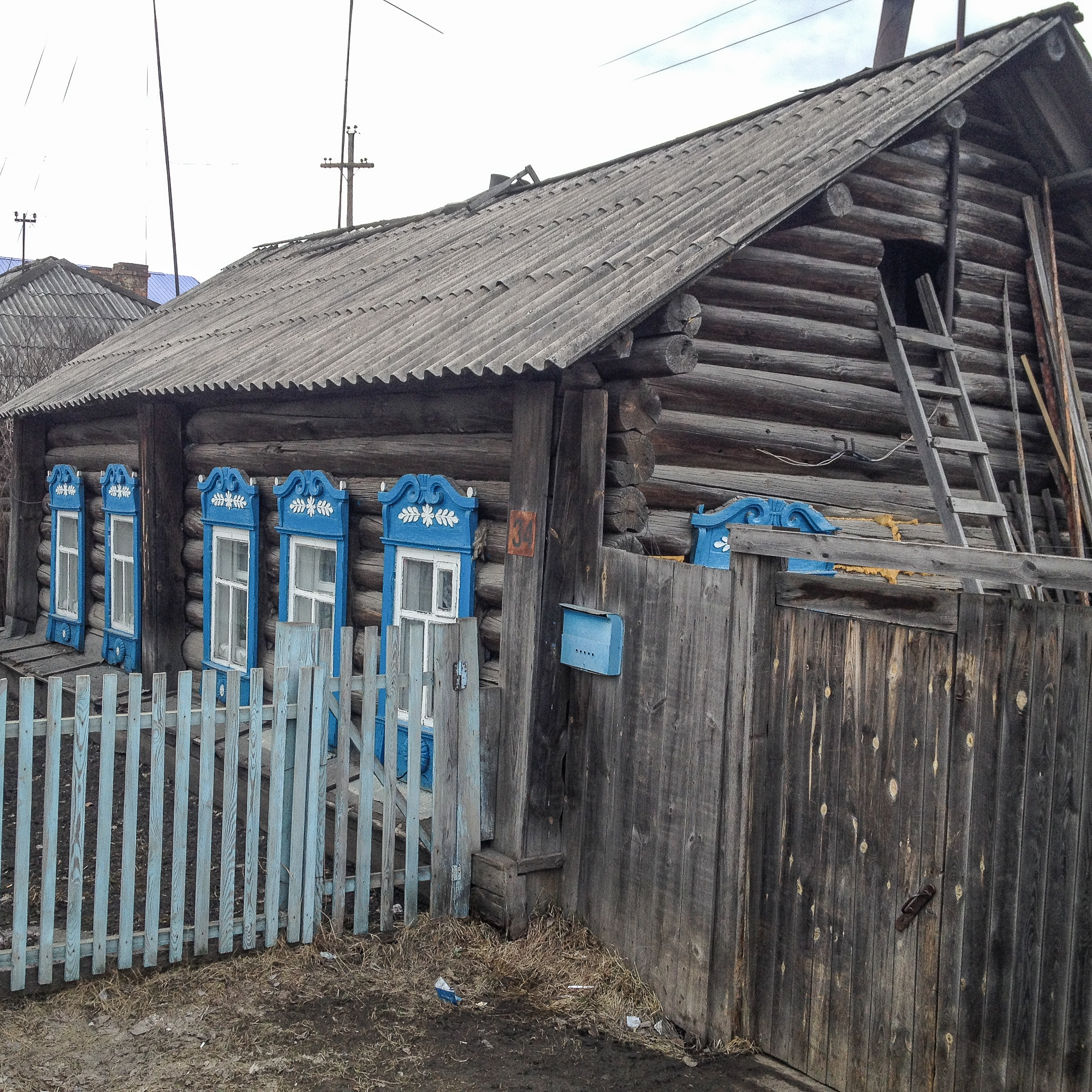

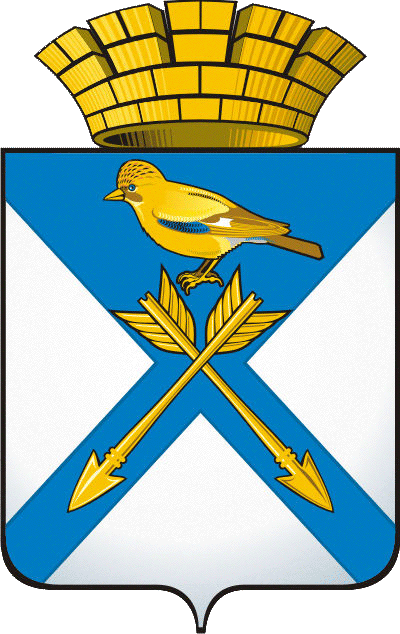
- Flag Coat of arms
- Interactive map of Tugulym
- Location of Tugulym Tugulym (Sverdlovsk Oblast)
- Coordinates: 57.0588°N 64.6407°E
- Country: Russia
- Federal subject: Sverdlovsk Oblast
- Administrative district: Tugulymsky District
- Elevation: 80 m (260 ft)

Population (2010 Census)
  - Total: 6,001
  - Estimate (2025): 5,055 (−15.8%)
- Time zone: UTC+5 (MSK+2)
- Postal code: 623650
- OKTMO ID: 65725000051

Tugulym (Russian: Тугулым) is an urban locality (an urban-type settlement) in Tugulymsky District of Sverdlovsk Oblast, Russia. Population: 6,001 (2010 census); 6,241 (2002 census); 6,908 (1989 Soviet census).
