= Tugulymsky District =

District in Sverdlovsk Oblast, Russia

Tugulymsky District Тугулымский район (Russian)
- District
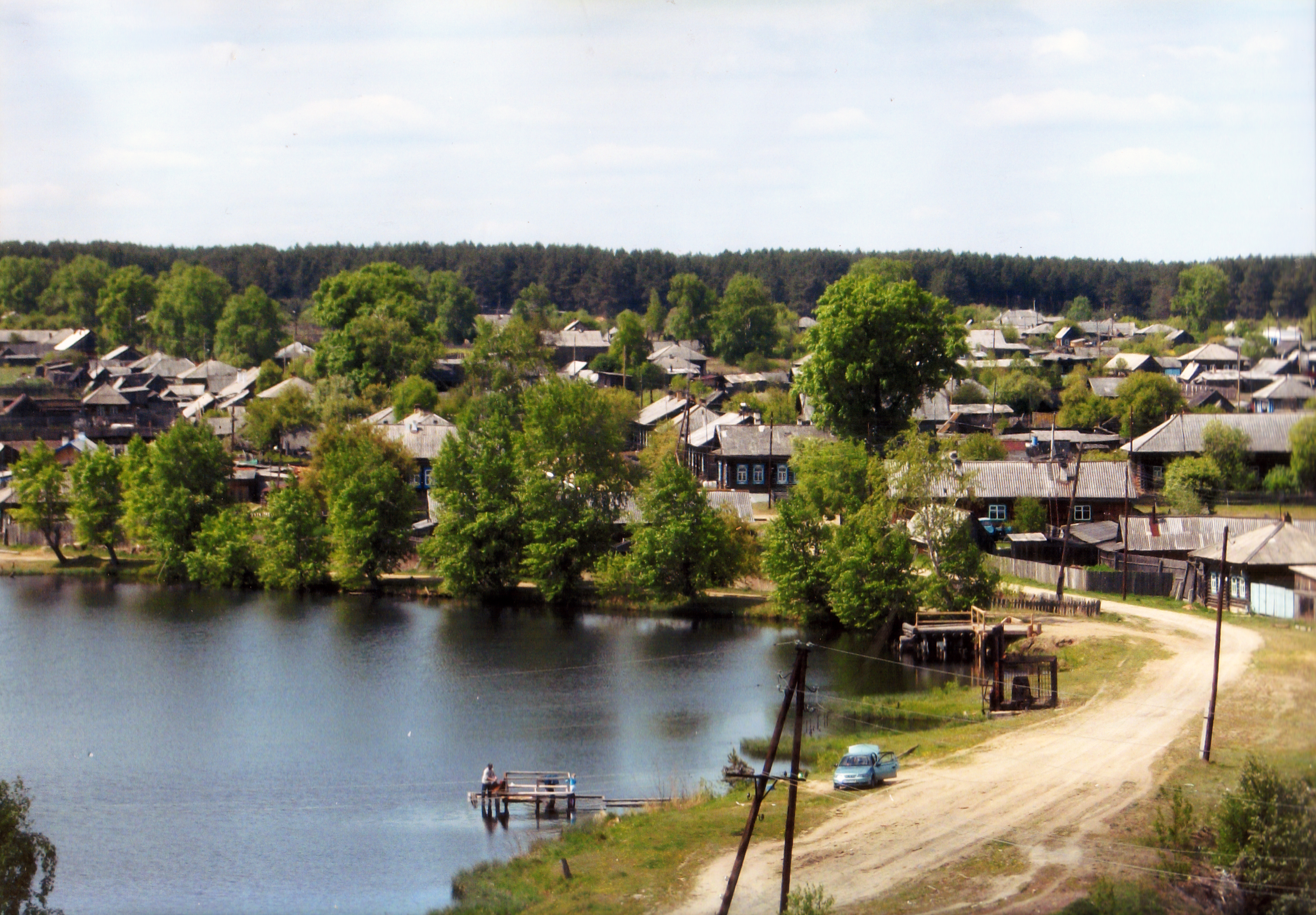
- Ertarsky, in Tugulymsky District

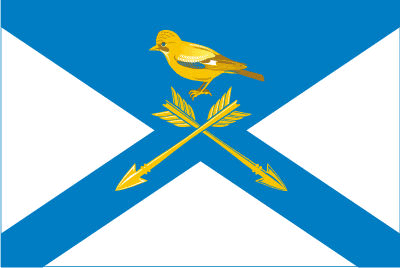
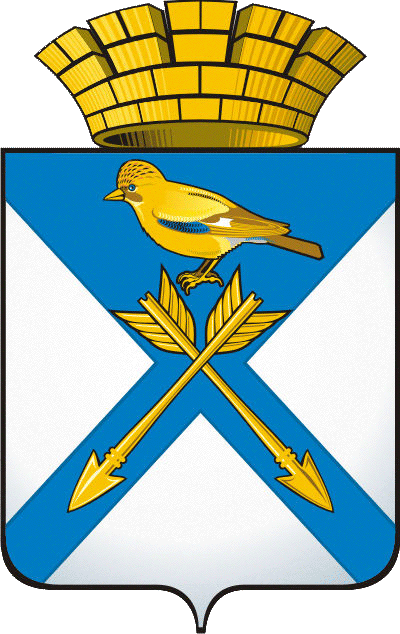
- Flag Coat of arms
- Location of Tugulymsky District in Sverdlovsk Oblast
- Coordinates: 57.167°N 64.564°E
- Country: Russia
- Federal subject: Sverdlovsk Oblast
- Administrative center: Tugulym

Area
  - Total: 3,333 km^{2} (1,287 sq mi)

Population (2010 Census)
  - Total: 22,581
  - Density: 6.775/km^{2} (17.55/sq mi)
  - Urban: 26.6%
  - Rural: 73.4%

Administrative structure
  - Administrative divisions: 1 Work settlements, 10 Selsoviets
  - Inhabited localities: 1 urban-type settlements, 51 rural localities

Municipal structure
  - Municipally incorporated as: Tugulymsky Urban Okrug
- Time zone: UTC+5 (MSK+2)
- OKTMO ID: 65725000
- Website: http://tugulym.gossaas.ru/

Tugulymsky District (Russian: Тугулы́мский райо́н) is an administrative district (raion), one of the thirty in Sverdlovsk Oblast, Russia. As a municipal division, it is incorporated as Tugulymsky Urban Okrug. The area of the district is 3,333 square kilometers (1,287 sq mi). Its administrative center is the urban locality (a work settlement) of Tugulym. Population: 22,581 (2010 Census); 25,455 (2002 census); 31,435 (1989 Soviet census). The population of Tugulym accounts for 26.6% of the district's total population.
