= 323rd Rifle Division =

- Active: 1941–1945
- Country: Soviet Union
- Branch: Red Army
- Type: Infantry
- Size: Division
- Engagements: Battle of Moscow; Belyov-Kozelsk Offensive; Battle of Smolensk (1943); Gomel-Rechitsa Offensive; Operation Bagration; Vistula-Oder Offensive; Pomeranian Offensive; Berlin Strategic Offensive Operation
- Decorations: Order of the Red Banner; Order of Suvorov
- Battle honours: Bryansk

Commanders
- Notable commanders: Maj. Gen. Ivan Alekseevich Gartsev; Col. Sergei Fyodorovich Ukranetz; Col. Abram Mikhailovich Cheryak; Maj. Gen. Vasily Timoveevich Maslov

The 323rd Rifle Division was formed as a standard Red Army rifle division late in the summer of 1941, as part of the massive buildup of new Soviet fighting formations at that time. After a successful but costly start in the Soviet winter counteroffensive in the Tula region the division served on relatively quiet sectors into 1943, after which it joined the offensive push into German-occupied western Russia through the rest of that year, winning a battle honor for the liberation of Bryansk. In the course of the destruction of Army Group Center in the summer of 1944, the division further distinguished itself in the liberation of Bialystok in July. In 1945 the men and women of the 323rd took part in the Vistula-Oder Offensive through Poland and into Pomerania, and then finally in the Battle of Berlin, ending the war with distinction, but being disbanded soon after.

== Formation ==
The 323rd Rifle Division began forming on August 1, 1941, in the Tambov Oblast of the Oryol Military District. Its primary order of battle was as follows:

- 1086th Rifle Regiment
- 1088th Rifle Regiment
- 1090th Rifle Regiment
- 892nd Artillery Regiment

Col. Ivan Alekseevich Gartsev was appointed to command on the same day, and he would hold this post for more than two years, being promoted to Major General on November 17, 1942. The division was assigned to the 10th (Reserve) Army in the Reserve of the Supreme High Command in October.

=== Battle of Moscow ===
10th Army was deployed in the last week of November west of the Oka River, downstream from Kashira, to defend both Kolomna and Ryazan from the German 2nd Panzer Army. The division arrived in Spassk-Ryazansky on November 29. It was noted as being outfitted with its main types of weapons and could be committed into the fighting upon concentration, but still lacked some weapons and auto transport. By December 5 it had reached Troitsa. The following day 10th Army was subordinated to Western Front, just as the Red Army counteroffensive was beginning. The 323rd went into action on December 6, attacking toward Mikhailov from the southeast from a line to the north of Slobodka; the German 29th and 10th Motorized Divisions had been identified in this area. On the morning of December 11, 10th Army's leading divisions, including the 323rd, were ordered to reach the line Uzlovaya station – Bogoroditsk – Kuzovka over the next 24 hours. On the 13th the division overcame resistance by units of 10th Motorized and 112th Infantry Division and occupied Yepifan. The offensive continued over the following days and the division's forward detachments reached Rzhavo on the 17th, while two of its rifle regiments had liberated Plavsk by the end of December 19. However, from December 17 – 19 the division lost 4,138 officers and men, with 1,200 missing, the remainder being killed, wounded or sick. Only 70 of these were sick or frostbitten, demonstrating that they were at least well dressed for the conditions. Still, this was 40 percent losses in just 72 hours, and the division was a long time in recovering.

The next stage of 10th Army's advance began on December 20, towards Belyov and Kozelsk; the depleted 323rd was moving into the area of Chastye Kolodezi. The Army's forces, along with 1st Guards Cavalry Corps, reached the Oka River north of Belyov on December 26 and the fight for the city began the next day, with the division in the second echelon. During the 27th the forward detachments of the 323rd were moving through Snykhovo towards the west; meanwhile Kozelsk was liberated by the cavalry. By the morning of the 29th the division was along the railroad 15-16km southeast of that town. On the last day of the year Belyov was freed by other elements of 10th Army; meanwhile the 323rd was moving to bypass the town of Sukhinichi from the south. Attempts by 324th and 239th Rifle Divisions to take this town from January 1–5, 1942, were unsuccessful.

On the latter date the 239th plus one battalion of the 323rd were left to blockade Sukhinichi while the rest of the division continued advancing to the area Polyaki-Buda – Monastyrskaya-Buda. From there it was to continue to Sloboda – Kotovichi – Zimnitsy. By the end of the day on January 9 the division had taken Lyudinovo and on the 10th continued fighting stubbornly to the west of that town. At this time 10th Army was encountering heavy snow and occasional blizzards which slowed the advance. The German forces also began to receive reinforcements from occupied France. The 323rd left a regiment in Lyudinovo and set out with its remaining forces towards Zhizdra on the night of January 15–16. The Germans launched a counterattack in the Lyudinovo area on the 18th and soon reoccupied the place, while also trying to relieve its besieged troops in Sukhinichi; the division fell back to the area Shipilovka – Usovka – Ignatovka. Part of the Sukhinichi garrison was extracted by the German relief force and the town was finally liberated on January 29. Fighting by both sides persisted into February with mixed success.

== Into Western Russia and Belarus ==
The division was next assigned to the 16th Army of Western Front, but from April, 1942 until February, 1943 it was back in 10th Army, holding the southern flank of the same Front. During February it returned to 16th Army, where it would remain until April. It was then withdrawn to the Reserve of the Supreme High Command for rebuilding over several months. General Gartsev left his command on August 13 and was very briefly replaced by two colonels in succession, before Col. Sergei Fyodorovich Ukranetz took over on August 18. By September 1 the division had been reassigned to the 25th Rifle Corps of 11th Army in Bryansk Front. On September 17, 1943, the city of Bryansk was liberated by Soviet forces, and the 323rd was given the name of this city as an honorific:

"BRYANSK... 323rd Rifle Division (Colonel Ukranetz, Sergei Fyodorovich)... The troops who participated in the battles during the crossing of the Desna and the liberation of Bryansk and Bezhitsa, by order of the Supreme High Command of September 17, 1943, and a commendation in Moscow, are given a salute of 12 artillery salvoes from 124 guns."

=== Gomel-Rechitsa Offensive ===
On October 10, Bryansk Front was disbanded, and 11th Army was moved to Belorussian Front. Over the next four weeks this Front's forces advanced towards the Dniepr River, and by November 9 the 11th Army had reached the line of the Sozh just north of the city of Gomel. The Front commander, Army General K.K. Rokossovski, determined its next move would be to liberate that city and the nearby town of Rechitsa on the Dniepr. By this time the 323rd had been reassigned to 53rd Rifle Corps, and this was to make the Army's main attack across the Sozh to encircle Gomel from the north, with the division on the north (right) flank. 11th Army faced the 134th and 299th Infantry Divisions of the German XXXV Army Corps.

"[T]he army's military council... entrusted 53rd Rifle Corps with [the] mission... to smash the defending enemy in their strongpoints, reach the Gomel – Zhlobin highway and railroad line, and, by doing so, cut the enemy withdrawal routes to the northwest. Then, linking up with 25th Rifle Corps [it was to] encircle the city and destroy the enemy's Gomel grouping."

This was to prove a tall order. The well-supported offensive began on November 12 and the Corps attacked German positions between Raduga and Kirpichni Factories but ran into very stiff resistance. The 323rd and 96th Rifle Divisions fought for three days to secure the village of Khalch, backed by the guns of 22nd Artillery Division. Khalch taken, the 217th Rifle Division of 25th Corps forced a crossing of the Sozh, and a general assault began on November 16. On the next day both the 96th and 323rd focused on seizing the village of Raduga, while the 217th headed for the eastern defenses of Gomel. The painful advance continued over the next several days, but German resistance finally began to flag by November 23. Soviet successes to the north and south, including the liberation of Rechitsa, forced German 9th Army to begin falling back to the Dniepr, and Gomel finally fell on November 26.

=== Operation Bagration ===
Colonel Ukranetz was succeeded by Col. Abram Mikhailovich Cheryak on December 14. In early 1944, still in Belorussian Front, the division was assigned to 35th Rifle Corps in 63rd Army. On February 18, 63rd Army was dissolved, and 35th Rifle Corps was reassigned to 3rd Army On May 24, Colonel Cheryak handed his command to Maj. Gen. Vasily Timoveevich Maslov; Maslov would remain in this post for the duration of the war. At the outset of Operation Bagration, on June 23, 35th Corps, under command of Maj. Gen. V. G. Zholudev, formed one of the two assault corps of 3rd Army, packed into less than ten kilometres of front opposite the northern half of the sector held by the German 134th Infantry Division. On the second day of the offensive, at 0400 hours, the assault force unleashed a massive 2-hour bombardment on the defenders in the Rogachev area, but by 0800 only the first line of German trenches had been taken, as bad weather had scrubbed the planned air support. As the weather cleared towards evening, further lines were taken, and the 9th Tank Corps prepared to exploit a breakthrough. Northwest of Bobruysk on June 26, the tankers cut the road to Mogilev behind the German XXXV Corps, with 35th and 41st Rifle Corps close behind and the 134th Infantry shattered and in flight. On the following day Bobruysk was surrounded, along with most of German 9th Army.

On July 21, the division's commander, General Maslov, was involved in an unfortunate incident involving two of his senior commanders, General Zholudev of 35th Corps and Lt. Gen. A.V. Gorbatov, commander of 3rd Army. Zholudev and Maslov were escorting Gorbatov, along with a number of other officers and men, to a new observation post that the 323rd had established. There was no clear route for the two light vehicles, and it became apparent that Maslov had lost his way. Gorbatov soon sensed the presence of the enemy, and ordered the vehicles to halt, at which time they came under fire from about 200 metres away. As the group attempted to escape, Zholudev was mortally wounded by German artillery fire.

== Into Poland and Germany ==
At about this time, 3rd Army was transferred to the 2nd Belorussian Front. On July 27, the 323rd played a leading role in the liberation of the city of Bialystok, for which it was awarded the Order of the Red Banner on August 9 for "exemplary fulfillment of command tasks" and its "valor and courage". In September the division was transferred to the 38th Rifle Corps in the 33rd Army, under which commands it would serve for the duration. 33rd Army was assigned to 1st Belorussian Front in October, and the 323rd went on to participate in the Vistula-Oder Offensive, the Pomeranian Offensive, and the Battle of Berlin as part of this Front.

== Postwar ==
The soldiers of the 323rd ended the war with the official title of 323rd Rifle, Bryansk, Order of the Red Banner, Order of Suvorov Division. (Russian: 323-я стрелковая Брянская Краснознамённая ордена Суворова дивизия.) According to STAVKA Order No. 11095 of May 29, 1945, part 6, the 323rd is listed as one of the rifle divisions to be "disbanded in place". It was disbanded in Germany in accordance with the directive during the summer of 1945.
