= 90th Rifle Division =

90th Rifle Division (February 1936 – March 1946)
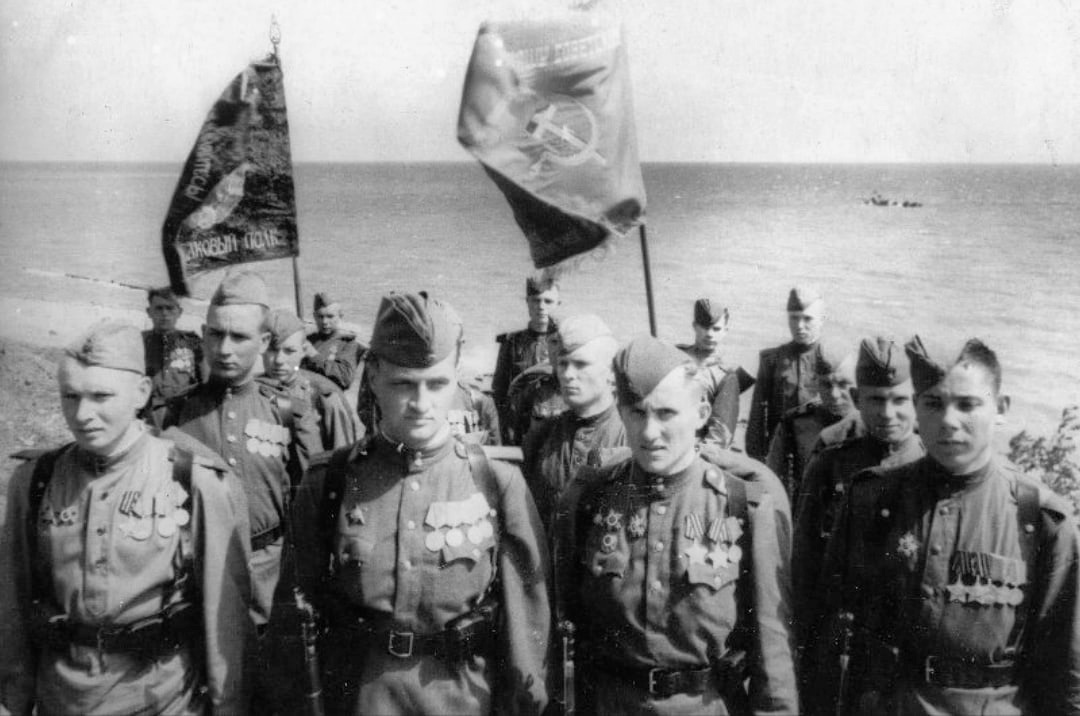
- Soldiers of the 90th Rifle Division on the coast of the Baltic Sea, June 4, 1945
- Active: 1936–1946
- Country: Soviet Union
- Branch: Red Army (1939-46)
- Type: Infantry
- Size: Division
- Engagements: Winter War; Soviet occupation of the Baltic states (1940); Operation Barbarossa; Baltic operation Leningrad strategic defensive Luga Defensive Line; Siege of Leningrad; Mga offensive Leningrad–Novgorod offensive Krasnoye Selo–Ropsha offensive Continuation War; Vyborg–Petrozavodsk offensive Battle of Tali–Ihantala; Tallinn offensive Vistula–Oder offensive East Pomeranian offensive Battle of Berlin
- Decorations: Order of the Red Banner; Order of Suvorov
- Battle honours: Ropsha

Commanders
- Notable commanders: Komdiv Konstantin Pavlovich Pyadyshev; Col. Platon Vasilevich Chernyaev; Kombrig Kuzma Nikitovich Galitskii; Kombrig Vladimir Ivanovich Shcherbakov; Komdiv Pantelemon Aleksandrovich Zaitsev; Col. Mikhail Ivanovich Golubev; Col. Aleksandr Ignatevich Korolyov; Col. Nikolai Nikitich Proskurin; Maj. Gen. Nikolai Georgievich Lyashchenko; Maj. Gen. Vasilii Lavrentevich Alekseenko

The 90th Rifle Division was formed as an infantry division of the Red Army in September 1936, in the Leningrad Military District, based on the shtat (table of organization and equipment) for rifle divisions of that period. During the Winter War with Finland it was part of the 7th Army on the Karelian Isthmus, and distinguished itself in the fighting for the Mannerheim Line, being awarded the Order of the Red Banner, as was one of its rifle regiments. In June, as part of 8th Army, it took part in the occupation of Estonia and remained there until the start of May 1941 when it was moved east into Lithuania as war with German threatened. When this began on June 22 it was still in that Army in the Baltic Special Military District, which was immediately redesignated as Northwestern Front. Deployed near the frontier with East Prussia it was struck and partly encircled; its commander and most of his staff were killed. A cadre managed to escape back into Estonia and through July and early August made a fighting withdrawal toward Narva and Kingisepp. As part of the Luga Operational Group it was encircled again south of Leningrad in late August and forced to exfiltrate through the forests and swamps to join 55th Army in Leningrad Front. It would remain under these commands, largely on the defensive and slowly rebuilding, until January 1943 when it was assigned to the Front's 67th Army just after the siege was partially lifted. During the spring it was briefly assigned the 2nd Shock Army before returning to the 67th for a July offensive toward Mga which failed to retake the key strongpoint of Sinyavino. Prior to the start of the January 1944 offensive that finally drove Army Group North away from Leningrad, the 90th returned to 2nd Shock and entered the Oranienbaum Bridgehead, from where it broke through the German front and liberated Ropsha, winning its name as an honorific. Over the following months it took part in the pursuit of the defeated German forces to the Panther Line under 42nd Army and was rewarded with the Order of Suvorov. As this campaign concluded in March the division moved back to Leningrad and then the Karelian Isthmus, first under 23rd Army before joining 21st Army for the offensive that drove Finland out of the war. After briefly garrisoning Vyborg the 90th again moved west and rejoined 8th Army for a second invasion of Estonia, after which it was moved to the Reserve of the Supreme High Command and returned to 2nd Shock Army, which soon joined 2nd Belorussian Front. During the January 1945 offensive into Poland the 90th advanced to the Vistula River before swinging through East Pomerania and taking part in the capture of Danzig in February and March. It immediately moved west with its Corps and Army to the lower reaches of the Oder River for the final offensive into Germany. Crossing operations began on April 18 and by April 26 the division was marching toward the Baltic coast, where it ended the war. In May it became part of the Group of Soviet Forces in Germany, but this assignment ended in January 1946 when 2nd Shock was railed back to the USSR. The 90th was disbanded near Voronezh in March.

== Formation ==
The 90th was formed in the Karelian Fortified Region just north of Leningrad in February 1936. Kombrig Konstantin Pavlovich Pyadyshev was appointed to command on February 17; between 1921 and 1931 he had led the 21st, 10th, and 16th Rifle Divisions but had since been in the training establishment. He would be promoted to Komdiv on November 26 but left the division on March 20, 1937, to become deputy chief of staff of Leningrad Military District. In July, Col. Platon Vasilevich Chernyaev took over as acting commander, but was replaced in November by Kombrig Kuzma Nikitovich Galitskii, who had previously served as deputy commander of 3rd Rifle Division and as chief of staff of Kharkov Military District. He was removed in July 1938 as part of the Great Purge and investigated, but later released to take command of the 24th Rifle Division in December 1939. This officer would lead both the 3rd Shock and 11th Guards Armies during the war with Germany and reached the rank of army general in 1955. From July to October 1938 Col. (later Kombrig) Vladimir Ivanovich Shcherbakov led the 90th in an acting role, before being reassigned to the 104th Mountain Rifle Division. He was replaced by Col. Pantelemon Aleksandrovich Zaitsev, who would be promoted to Kombrig on November 4, 1939, just before the start of the Winter War with Finland. He had previously served as chief of staff of the 70th Rifle Division.

In September 1939, for security and intelligence reasons, all the rifle divisions had their regiments' numbers "scrambled", and the 90th emerged with the following order of battle:

- 19th Rifle Regiment
- 173rd Rifle Regiment
- 286th Rifle Regiment
- 96th Artillery Regiment
- 149th Howitzer Artillery Regiment (until August 15, 1941)
- 66th Antitank Battalion
- 44th Reconnaissance Company
- 17th Sapper Battalion
- 69th Signal Battalion
- 26th Medical/Sanitation Battalion
- 59th Chemical Defense (Anti-gas) Platoon (later 53rd)
- 177th Motor Transport Company (later 54th)
- 168th Field Bakery (later 16th Motorized Field Bakery)
- 215th Divisional Veterinary Hospital
- 111th Divisional Artillery Workshop
- 325th Regimental Artillery Workshop
- 286th Field Postal Station (later 856th)
- 199th Field Office of the State Bank

== Winter War ==
Before the invasion of Finland the 90th was assigned to 50th Rifle Corps of 7th Army, which would mount the attack into the Karelian Isthmus, initially under command of Komandarm 2nd Rank V. F. Yakovlev; it would later come under Komandarm 2nd Rank K. A. Meretskov, who as commander of Leningrad Military District was in charge of the entire operation. The Army contained 12 rifle divisions, although this would later rise to 14, plus three tank brigades and a mechanized corps, for a total of just under 1,000 tanks; several of the divisions were still in the process of forming up. The objective was Viipuri, breaching the Mannerheim Line and eventually driving west to Helsinki. 50th Corps was on the Army's right flank, aimed at Taipale on the east end of the Line, but the 90th was on the left flank of the Corps.

The invasion began on November 30. 50th Corps faced the Finnish III Army Corps, and by December 4 the covering troops were taking up positions in the Mannerheim Line. Two days later Yakovlev's troops pulled up to the line and stopped to regroup, bringing up their artillery. The first attempt to break the line began the same day as the 90th's Corps-mates, the 49th and 150th Rifle Divisions, attempted to cross the Taipale River against the Finnish 10th Infantry Division. This attack intensified on December 14 and continued most of the rest of the month, without any Soviet success, although the 10th Infantry was severely weakened. The 90th was deployed at the other end of Lake Suvanto opposite Kiviniemi. Here a narrow channel connected Suvanto with the rest of the Vuoksi waterway. On December 7 the 19th Rifle Regiment forced a crossing which technically breached the Mannerheim Line but was an operational dead end as both sides were committed in other places. Nevertheless, for this success the 19th would be awarded the Order of the Red Banner on January 15, 1940, the first unit decoration of the Winter War.

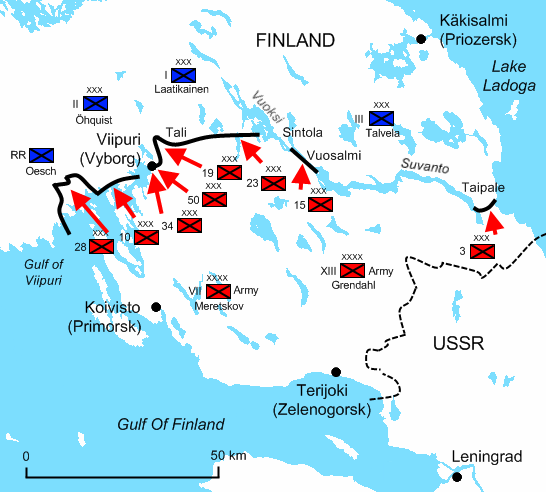
Situation on the Karelian Isthmus March 13, 1940. Note position of 19th Rifle Corps.

The war went into a lull during January as both sides reorganized. On the Soviet side the commanding headquarters was Northwestern Front under Komandarm 1st Rank S. K. Timoshenko, while Meretskov took direct command of 7th Army. This Army was split, with 13th Army taking over the Taipale sector. The 90th remained in 7th Army but was moved to 19th Rifle Corps. Timoshenko escalated air and artillery attacks on the Finnish positions on February 1 as he concentrated his forces on the Summa sector. The bombardment and probing actions grew until February 11 when the 123rd Rifle Division, also of 19th Corps, penetrated the Line along the Lähde Road with the 35th Tank Brigade. Finnish counterattacks slowed the advance but failed to push it back and soon the road to Viipuri was open, although Meretskov failed to grasp the opportunity. In the afternoon of February 15 the Finnish commander-in-chief, Field Marshal C. G. E. Mannerheim, authorized his II Army Corps to pull back to the Intermediate Line. The fighting continued until March 13 when a ceasefire took place. For its role in the victory, on April 7 the 90th would also receive the Order of the Red Banner.

=== Occupation of the Baltic States ===
On May 9 Zaitsev was promoted to the rank of Komdiv. At about the same time he took command of 50th Corps, and his rank was modernized to major general on June 4. He would go on to serve in several commands during the defense of Leningrad, ending in command of the 122nd Rifle Corps in December 1943, but was mortally wounded by a shell fragment on March 1, 1944, near Narva, and died the same day. He was eventually replaced in command of the 90th on April 2, 1941, by Col. Mikhail Ivanovich Golubev.

Despite the absence of a permanent commander the division began moving west on June 8, still in 19th Corps which was now part of 8th Army. It concentrated west of Pskov and took part in the occupation of Estonia beginning on June 16. It advanced as far as Pärnu, and also sent detachments to the islands of Ösel and Dago. It remained in Estonia until May 1, 1941, when it began moving to the western border of Lithuania.

== Operation Barbarossa ==
At the outset of the German invasion on June 22 the 90th was assigned to 10th Rifle Corps of 8th Army in the Baltic Special Military District. On the same day this was redesignated as Northwestern Front. It was in the center of its Army, tying into its Corps-mate, the 10th Rifle Division, on its right, and the 125th Rifle Division of 11th Rifle Corps on the right, well to the southwest of Varniai. Colonel Golubev had his headquarters 5km northeast of Šilalė with the rifle regiments encamped at Kvėdarna, Pagramantis, and Kaltinėnai, and with one battalion of each near the frontier as a covering force. Of the rifle divisions deployed in the west the 90th was unique in still having an organic tank battalion. This was equipped with T-26 and T-37A light tanks which did not survive long once the fighting started. The division was deployed on a line some 60km long, directly in the path of German 18th Army's I Army Corps.

The District commander, Col. Gen. F. I. Kuznetsov, had disregarded the instructions of the NKO and General Staff to avoid any action that might be taken as a provocation. On June 15, alarmed by intelligence reports of the German buildup, issued orders to increase force readiness along the frontier. Without directly mentioning the buildup he stated, "Today, as never before, we must be fully combat ready. Many commanders do not understand this. But all must firmly and clearly understand that at any moment we must be ready to fulfill any combat mission." After receiving further intelligence two days later Kuznetsov ordered his forces to full military readiness on June 18. While his actions were brave in going against orders from the top and militarily correct, it's unlikely that they made any real difference when the war began.

The invasion began with an artillery preparation at 0310 hours. In the initial hours the 90th was partially surrounded and Golubev was killed in action. On July 4 the head of the Front's political department, Brigade Commissar Ryabchi, reported: "...90th Rifle Division —the remnants of the division's units have been scattered by the enemy. There is no division headquarters. The division no longer exists organizationally and is being formed anew." In the chaos Golubev's death remained unknown to higher headquarters until July 6, and Col. Ivan Ivanovich Plenkin took over the next day. Somehow the division's banner and documents were carried across the Daugava River into Estonia so it escaped being disbanded, and on July 10 it was still in 8th Army's order of battle under 10th Corps, along with the 10th Rifle and 22nd NKVD Rifle Divisions.

=== Leningrad strategic defensive ===
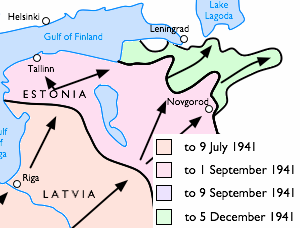
Leningrad Strategic Defensive

While the main body of Army Group North was advancing on the primary route to Leningrad, smaller forces were clearing the left flank along the Baltic coast and Estonia. Beginning on July 11 the four infantry divisions of XXXXII and XXVI Army Corps defeated 10th Corps and occupied Tartu, Pärnu, and Tallinn. 10th Corps had tied down those four divisions at the cost of heavy losses, including some 20,000 taken prisoner, but this did little to weaken the drive on Leningrad. By the beginning of August the 90th had joined the Kingisepp Sector of the Luga Operational Group. On August 6 the 90th formed the 387th (later 90th) Mortar Battalion, which would be disbanded on October 19, 1942.

The Kingisepp Sector, under command of Maj. Gen. V. V. Semashko, consisted of the 90th and 191st Rifle Divisions, two Opolcheniye divisions, and several other assets. On July 23 Hitler had reiterated his goal of taking Leningrad before marching on Moscow. Beginning on August 8, the Northern Group of Army Group North was to attack from the Poreche and Sabsk bridgeheads over the Luga, through Kingisepp toward Leningrad. On August 11, after three days of heavy fighting which cost the attackers 1,600 casualties, the XXXXI Motorized Corps and XXXVIII Army Corps were able to penetrate the defenses of 90th Rifle and 2nd Opolcheniye Divisions along the Luga at Kingisepp, Ivanovskoe, and Bolshoi Sabsk. The 8th Panzer Division was now committed, which cut the Kingisepp–Krasnogvardeisk rail line the next day. Kingisepp itself fell on August 16 and most of the defenders fell back to the Krasnogvardeisk Fortified Region. Colonel Plenkin had left the division on August 10 and was eventually replaced on August 25 by Col. Ivan Fyodorovich Abramov.

== Siege of Leningrad ==
The fall of Krasnogvardeisk cut the communications of the Luga Operational Group with Leningrad. Luga was abandoned on August 20 and the Group, including the 90th, had to cut its way out of the encirclement to the north and east in small groups, hounded all the way by 8th Panzer, 4th SS Division Polizei, 96th, and 269th Infantry Divisions. German estimates showed losses of 30,000 personnel, 120 tanks, and 400 guns.

On August 31 the division was assigned to 55th Army in Leningrad Front. Colonel Abramov was replaced for a single day on September 10 by Col. Aleksei Andreevich Daryin, then on September 12 by Col. Aleksandr Ignatevich Korolyov. On September 8 the 20th Motorized Division reached Shlisselburg on Lake Ladoga and completed the encirclement of the city. 55th Army was now defending the Slutsk–Kolpino Fortified District from Pustoshka to the Neva with the 90th, 70th, 168th, and 4th Leningrad Opolchenie Divisions deployed on the expected German axis of attack. Stalin, reacting with anger to the completion of the encirclement, appointed Army Gen. G. K. Zhukov to command of Leningrad Front on September 9. On September 12 the 168th brought the advance of XXVIII Corps on Slutsk and Fedorovskoye to a halt after only minimal gains. Through most of the rest of the month 18th Army focused on driving north to the coast of the Baltic Sea west of Leningrad which would put its forces in its southern outskirts.

=== Second Sinyavino Offensive ===
On the last day of October the new commander of Leningrad Front, Lt. Gen. M. S. Khozin, presented plans for a two-phase operation to retake Sinyavino, Mga, and Tosno before cutting the Shlisselburg corridor. This was to be led by the Neva Operational Group, while 55th Army was to join in on November 2 with a total of seven rifle divisions and a tank brigade. The four divisions in first echelon were to capture Ust'-Tosno and two other villages before taking bridgeheads over the Tosno River. By November 6 the three divisions in second echelon were to exploit toward Mga Station to support 54th Army. Following this the combined 55th, 54th, and 8th Armies would take Tosno and break the blockade. The first echelon struck the German 96th Division but made little impression at the cost of heavy casualties. On November 9 Khozin presented a revised plan which would involve 40 medium and heavy tanks plus three fresh volunteer rifle regiments. This effort began the same day with much the same results. After November 11 the 90th and three other divisions, with a pair of tank battalions, were committed, to no avail. 54th Army, in the event, was tied down by the German advance on Tikhvin and was unable to cooperate. The entire operation was a bloody failure, and, among other changes, Maj. Gen. I. G. Lazarev was removed from command of 55th Army, being replaced by Lt. Gen. V. P. Sviridov.

The 90th would remain in 55th Army, in much the same positions, near Kolpino, into January 1943. Colonel Korolyov left the division on November 8, 1942, being replaced by Col. Nikolai Nikitich Proskurin. Operation Iskra, which restored land communications to Leningrad, was fought by 67th Army from within the city and 2nd Shock Army from outside and did not directly involve 55th Army. The offensive ended on January 31, by which time the division had been transferred to the 67th, as part of a vain effort to sustain it and take Sinyavino.

=== Mga Offensive ===
In April the 90th was moved to 2nd Shock, but a month later was directly under Front command, and in June returned to the 67th. The Army had the 30th Guards Rifle Corps plus six separate divisions under command. On May 28 Colonel Proskurin was replaced by Col. Nikolai Georgievich Lyashchenko. Proskurin became chief of staff of 46th Rifle Division but would be mortally wounded on February 1, 1944. Lyashchenko had previously led the 106th Rifle Division and the 73rd Naval Rifle Brigade, and would be promoted to major general on June 3, 1944. He would remain in command into peacetime.

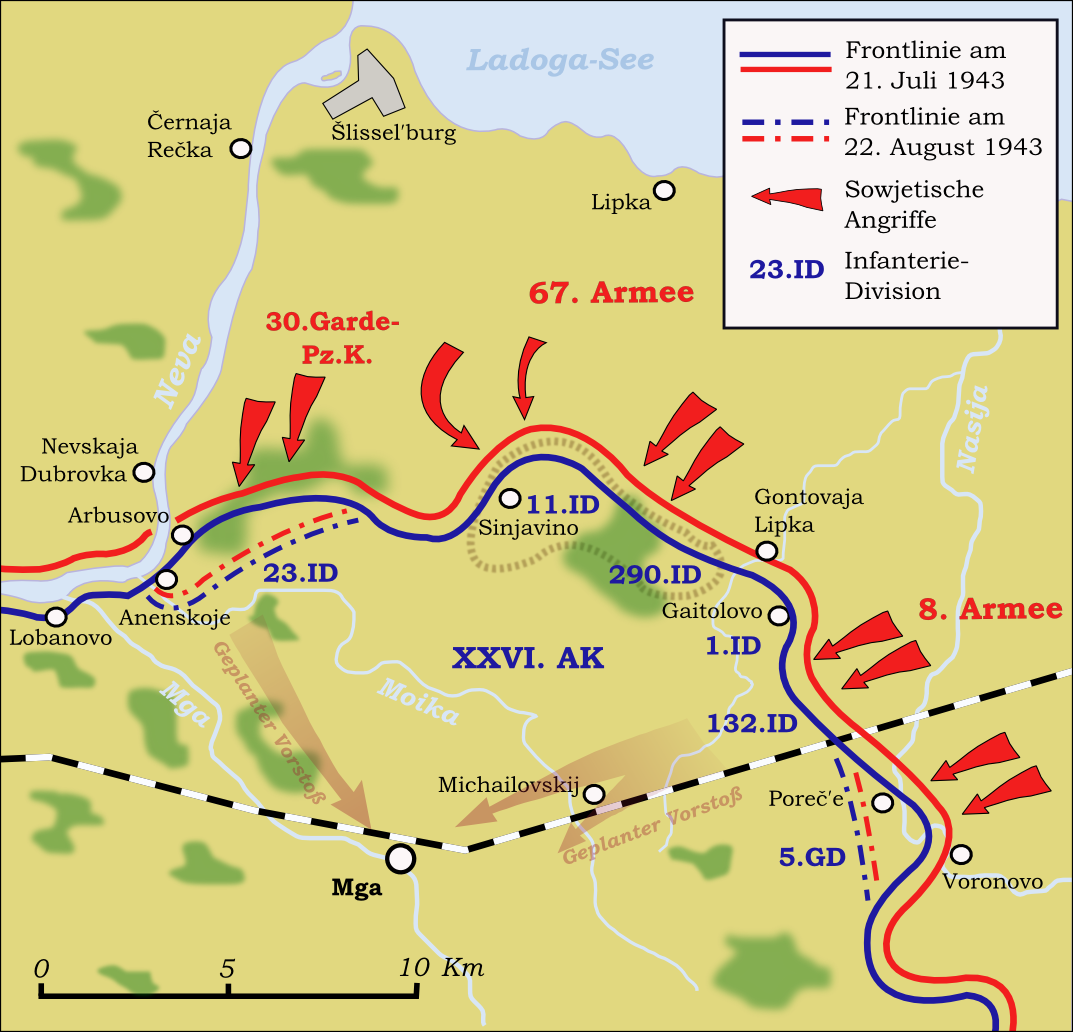
Mga (5th Sinyavino) Offensive

After the German offensive at Kursk had been fought to a standstill the STAVKA ordered Leningrad (now under command of Col. Gen. L. A. Govorov) and Volkhov Fronts to mount an offensive which would defeat German 18th Army and prevent any possibility of restoring the Leningrad blockade. This would additionally tie down German reserves to keep them from reinforcing other sectors. The mission, per the Leningrad war diary:

Monday, 12 July. Our artillery has been concentrating along the Siniavino axis since 1 July. Today it began the planned destruction of enemy engineer works and the suppression of his artillery and mortar batteries. It is as if it were an overture to the forthcoming operation whose main mission is to spoil possible enemy attempts to restore the complete blockade of Leningrad.

The two Fronts were to attack the Mga salient from three sides with the 55th, 67th, and 8th Armies. 67th Army was responsible for the center section between the Neva and Sinyavino. If successful the XXVI Army Corps would be destroyed and both Mga and Sinyavino would be taken.

Maj. Gen. M. P. Dukhanov deployed his 67th Army in the area of Gorodok No. 2 with 30th Guards Corps as his main shock group. With armor support it was to take Arbuzovo before advancing on Mga from the north. He further deployed four divisions to the east with the 90th on the west (right) flank to attack in the direction of Sinyavino and Gontovaya Lipka to tie down the German Sinyavino grouping. Altogether XXVI Corps' 35,000 men faced a Red Army force of over 75,000 plus 120 tanks. If 67th Army succeeded the 55th would launch a supporting attack. Meanwhile, 8th Army would strike toward Mga from the east. The offensive began early on July 22 following a 150-minute artillery preparation. The 63rd Guards Rifle Division soon achieved its first day objectives, but XXVI Corps quickly reinforced its entire Sinyavino front and the battle became what one guardsman called "an offensive on our bellies." The bloody fighting continued until August 22 and ended with Sinyavino still in German control. In early September the 90th went back to the Leningrad Front reserves. In October it returned to 2nd Shock, where it was assigned to 43rd Rifle Corps in November.

== Leningrad-Novgorod Offensive ==
43rd Corps was under command of Maj. Gen. A. I. Andreev, and also contained the 48th and 98th Rifle Divisions. 2nd Shock Army was led by Lt. Gen. I. I. Fedyuninsky. His first task was to transfer his Army into the Oranienbaum bridgehead, making use of the Baltic Fleet to move it across the ice roads over the Gulf of Finland. The process began on November 5 and continued until January 21, 1944, after the offensive had already begun.

=== Krasnoye Selo-Ropsha Offensive ===
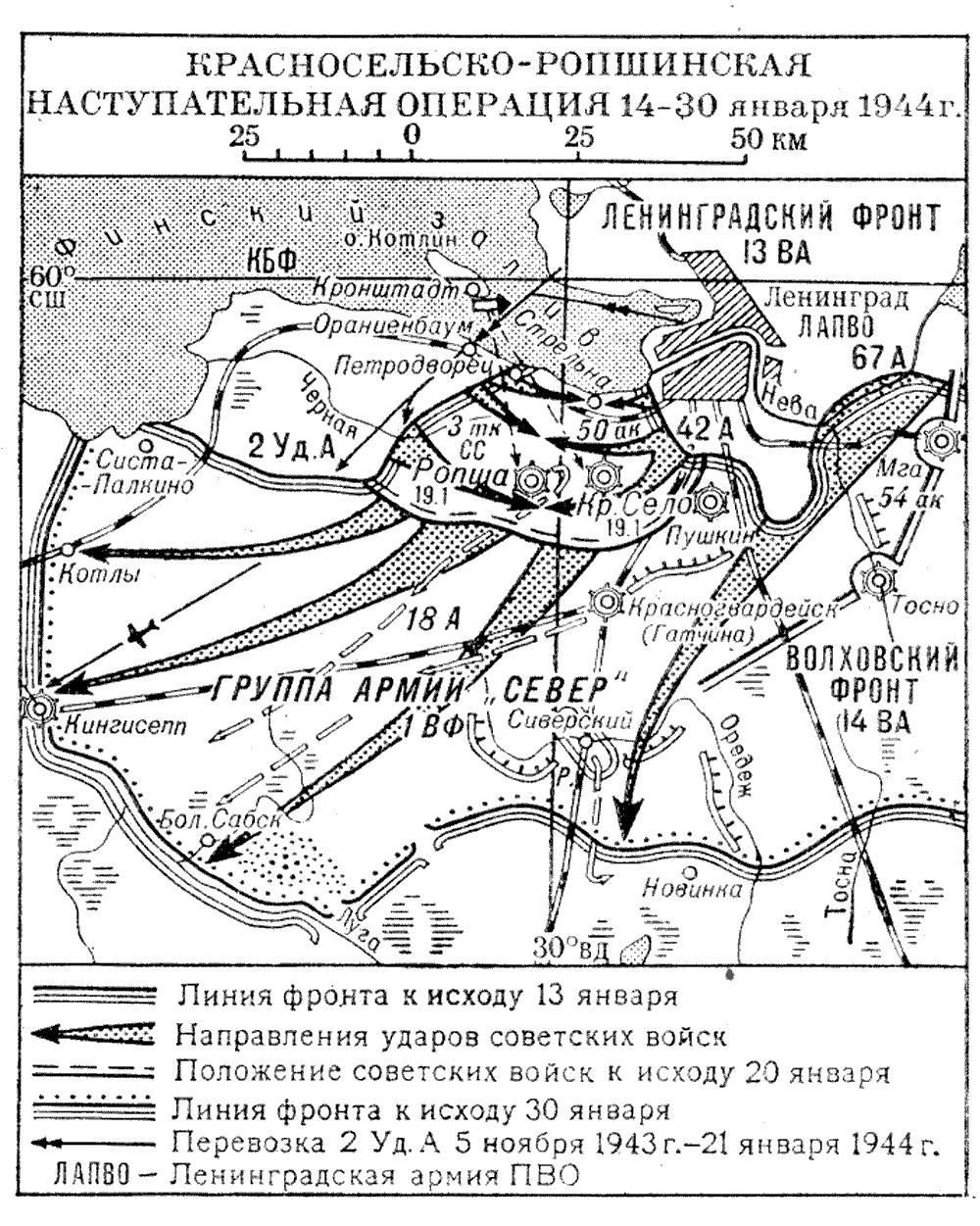
Soviet-era map of the offensive

General Govorov planned to have 2nd Shock and 42nd Armies break through the German lines they faced and then link up at Ropsha, cutting off the German forces between that place and the Gulf of Finland. This would also reestablish land communications with Oranienbaum. Fedyuninskii placed his 43rd and 122nd Rifle Corps in first echelon of the attack, with the 90th and 48th in first echelon of the 43rd.

The offensive began at dawn on January 14 with a massive artillery preparation of 104,000 shells over 65 minutes against the positions of the 9th and 10th Luftwaffe Field Divisions. Despite extensive fortifications built since 1941 the massed Soviet riflemen of the 90th and 48th, plus the 131st Rifle Division of 122nd Corps, assisted by tanks, soon overcame the forward defenses and by day's end had gained up to 3km on a 10km-wide front. The advance continued overnight as the 131st and 90th Divisions, supported by 2nd and 204th Tank Regiments and 152nd Tank Brigade, pushed forward another 4km, and the next day shattered what was left of 10th Luftwaffe Division, while the 168th Division was committed from second echelon. 2nd Shock was finally halted by heavy fire west of Ropsha. 42nd Army also made good progress from its side on the first two days.

January 16 saw the battle develop with greater fury and during its course Fediuninsky's forces completed the penetration of the main defensive belt. He now formed a small mobile group from a tank brigade, a self-propelled artillery regiment, a battalion of infantry in trucks, an artillery battalion, and other units with orders to take Ropsha at all costs. Counterattacks brought this to a halt halfway to the objective. During January 17 the 90th penetrated into Diatlitsy. While the German High Command debated the retreat of 18th Army the entire 2nd Shock Army surged ahead on January 18 and a combined force of 2nd Shock took Ropsha the next day. In recognition the division received a battle honor:

ROPSHA - ...90th Rifle Division (Colonel Lyashchenko, Nikolai Georgievich)... By order of the Supreme High Command of 19 January 1944 and a commendation in Moscow, the troops who participated in the battles for the liberation of Krasnoye Selo and Ropsha are given a salute of 20 artillery salvoes from 224 guns.

The same day, at 2100 hours the 462nd Rifle Regiment of the 168th linked up with the 54th Engineer Battalion of 42nd Army's mobile group just south of the town. On the morning of January 20 the two Armies met all along their fronts, closing the door behind the German grouping to the north. Shortly after the 90th was transferred to 42nd Army's 108th Rifle Corps. It would remain in the 108th for the duration of the war.

The next objective, apart from mopping up the encircled German forces, was to advance in the direction of Luga. This would involve 42nd Army capturing Krasnogvardeisk and 2nd Shock protecting its right flank. By January 24 the Army was advancing along the Krasnogvardeisk–Kingisepp railroad, but only made modest gains against stiffening resistance. During the next day the 108th advanced 5km with the 220th Tank Brigade and cut the railroad, and on January 26 jointly captured Elizavetino with 122nd Corps. Unbeknownst to Hitler, the chief of staff of Army Group North ordered the overdue withdrawal to begin overnight on January 27/28.

=== To the Panther Line ===
42nd Army continued its advance over the next few days against dwindling resistance and captured the important German supply base at Volosovo. Its spearheads reached the Luga River on January 30 and captured several bridgeheads. By this time German 18th Army's left flank and center were in full retreat. On February 7 the Army fought a meeting engagement with elements of Army Group North attempting to take up positions for a counterattack southwest of Luga and east of Lake Peipus. The Army advanced to the south in a single echelon from west of the Plyussa River to the east bank of the lake. 108th Corps, on the Army's right flank, reached Iamm Station on the Zhelba River before being halted by the 207th Infantry Division. 116th and 123rd Rifle Corps regrouped during February 6–8 and prepared to assault southeastward toward the Luga–Pskov railroad but their advance the next day ran into the German counterattack force, most of which had not yet reached its designated positions. Later, on February 10 the 12th Panzer Division began a planned counterattack which ran directly into the 196th and 128th Rifle Divisions of 108th Corps and 168th Division of 123rd Corps, which were attempting to encircle German forces defending Iamm Station from the east. Although the panzers managed to halt the 128th, they were themselves halted, which brought Army Group North's overall counterstrike to a conclusion.

With the failure of this attack, 18th Army was ordered to abandon Luga, which took place on February 12. The Army was now directed to commence a general withdrawal to the Panther Line, which was to be complete by March 1. Col. Gen. I. I. Maslennikov, in command of 42nd Army, left part of his forces to guard his flank on the east shore of the lake while the 108th and 123rd Corps attacked toward Pskov to the south, and the 116th Corps toward Plyussa and Strugi Krasnye. This led to a 40km-wide gap developing between these thrusts as the XXVI Army Corps defended along the upper Lochkina River. The 90th and 128th Divisions, backed by the 5th Ski Brigade, established a bridgehead across the gap between Lake Peipus and Lake Chud, but counterattacks by L Army Corps forced it to be abandoned on February 16. A further withdrawal from Lake Pirissar was forced on February 24. By the end of the month many of the Front's rifle divisions had been reduced by 2,500 to 3,500 men each. On March 2, Govorov ordered his 42nd and 67th Armies to "liberate Pskov and Ostrov no later than 10 March and then force the Velikaia River." Sources differ as to the length of this fighting, which may have continued into early April, but the defenses of the Panther Line were not significantly breached. On March 22, in recognition of its successes in the campaign, the 90th was awarded the Order of Suvorov, 2nd Degree.

== Vyborg–Petrozavodsk Offensive ==
Later in March the division moved with 108th Corps back to Leningrad Front reserves. During April the Corps was moved to 23rd Army, north of Leningrad, but the 90th was briefly under direct Army command. By the beginning of June it was back in the Corps, which was under direct Front command. During the buildup to the invasion of Finland the 108th was assigned to 21st Army. At this time the Corps had the 90th, 46th, and 314th Rifle Divisions.

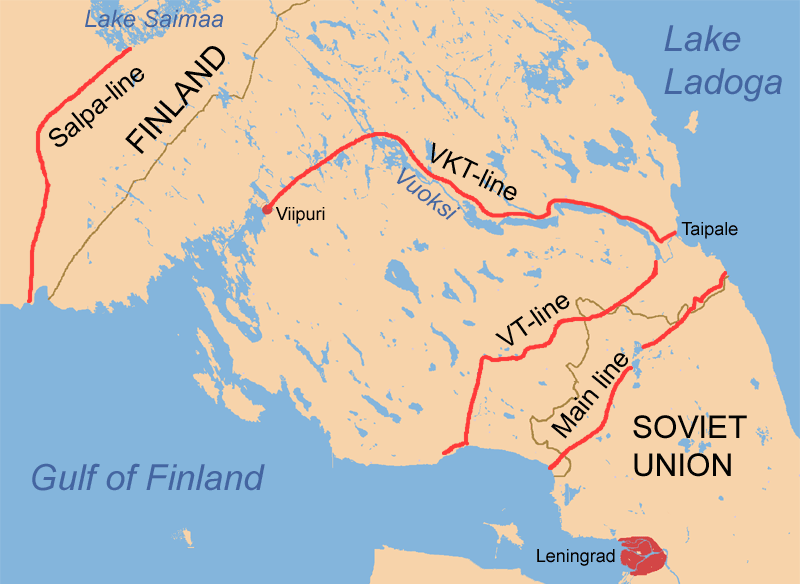
Map showing the four main defence lines built by Finland; Main line, VT-line, VKT-line and the Salpa-line. The Soviet offensive was stopped at the VKT-line.

The victory against German 18th Army left Finland still in control of the territory in the Karelian Isthmus it had retaken in 1941. The STAVKA, now with an abundance of resources, set a priority on defeating the Finnish forces, reoccupying the Isthmus, possibly occupying Helsinki, but in any case driving Finland out of the war. The USSR officially published its peace terms on February 28, but these were rejected on March 8. Although negotiations continued, the STAVKA began planning for operations in May.

The commander of 21st Army, Lt. Gen. D. N. Gusev (as of June 18 Col. Gen.) had three rifle Corps in first echelon and would conduct the main attack on a front from northwest of Sestroretsk facing the Finnish III and IV Army Corps. As the 108th and 110th Rifle Corps were just arriving they were added to the Army's substantial reserve. The lead Corps were assigned a breakthrough sector from Hill 107.4 to the shore of the Gulf of Finland. Gusev opened with a reconnaissance-in-force at 1800 hours on June 9 following a 15-minute artillery preparation to uncover, as far as possible, the Finnish fire plan. The main offensive began the following day at 0820 hours after the Finnish defenses had been battered by artillery for 140 minutes. During the day the 30th Guards Rifle Corps made the greatest progress, advancing up to 15km into the defenses and capturing strongpoints at Mainila and Staryi Beloostrov. The Finnish command was now convinced it could not successfully hold anywhere in front of their second defensive line, and this retrograde began almost immediately.

During the first three days of the offensive toward Vyborg the 21st and 23rd Armies advanced to the second line on a 60km-wide front but came to an abrupt halt in the face on increasing resistance and counterattacks. Govorov quickly realized this would not be taken easily and now paused to regroup for a formal penetration operation, bringing up all heavy artillery and additional forces. Late on June 12, seeing that the Finns had concentrated their arriving reinforcements on the sector astride the Vyborg road facing 30th Guards Corps, he shifted his attack axis to the coastal sector on 21st Army's left flank and reinforced it with the 110th Corps. Gusev would first strike with the 108th and 109th Corps in the sector Metsiakiulia–Kuuterselkä toward Summa in order to reach the line Lukola–Lake Vammeljarvi–Inonkiulia by late on June 14 after an advance of 20km. Only afterward would he commit the 110th; the intention was to prevent the withdrawal of IV Corps. The goal was to capture Vyborg during June 18-20.

=== Advance on Vyborg ===
By the "white night" of June 13/14 Gusev had concentrated 1,744 guns and mortars on a 20km-wide attack sector. These guns fired a 90-minute preparation which was added to by the guns of the Baltic Fleet on the coastal sector. The 108th and 109th Corps began the ground attack at 0930 hours. 108th Corps initially struck the Finnish 1st Cavalry Brigade at Vankhasakha and Metsiakiulia with little success but by 1800 two divisions of the 109th, with armor support, had captured several Finnish strongpoints. The 90th and 46th Divisions resumed the attack the next day with support from the 260th Tank and 1238th Self-propelled Artillery Regiments and these, along with a heavy artillery preparation, took the two Finnish strongpoints that had been blocking their advance. By early on June 16 the two Armies had penetrated to a depth of 40km on a front of 75km in heavier fighting than had been anticipated. Gusev now committed the 110th Corps to reinforce the attack along the Uusikirkko axis. Advancing abreast his three Corps (30th Guards had been withdrawn for replenishment) covered 6-15km, reaching positions from Perkjärvi Station to Sortavala by the end of the day, despite poor weather cancelling most air support. This progress was less than Govorov had expected and he issued orders for a more "energetic" pursuit on June 17. This involved the formation of forward detachments of motorized infantry with armor and artillery support. On the same evening the two Finnish corps were ordered to fall back to the VKT Line.

21st Army advanced 10-14km along the Vyborg axis on June 17. 110th Corps reached Lake Mikkelin-jarvi, Loistova, Varpulila and Pikhkala, and by day's end its left flank divisions and the entire 109th Corps had reached the third defensive belt. The following day the remainder of the 110th, with the assistance of the 1st and 152nd Tank Brigades, had reached positions south of Summa and Leypyasuo, while the 108th Corps, led by the 46th and 314th Divisions and supported by 30th Guards Tank Brigade, advanced along the coast, penetrated the belt, covered 25km, and took the port town of Koivisto. At this point Gusev brought up the 97th Rifle Corps from second echelon, attached the two tank corps, and gave orders to push through the belt between Summa and Markki and advance along the Summa–Vyborg road. Meanwhile, 110th Corps was to cover the 97th's left flank while penetrating the boundary between the 3rd Infantry Brigade and 10th Infantry Division before attacking north along the Iokhannes road to prevent a Finnish withdrawal along the coastal route. Following this the Corps was to push northward to take Limatta Station and Khuvila before taking Vyborg itself.

The attack was renewed early on June 19 and was almost immediately successful. A 70km-wide gap was torn in the defense between Muolaa and the Gulf of Finland. This was followed by an advance of some 14km in 18 hours of fighting against stiff resistance; 110th Corps reached Kakinsari while the 314th fought south of Kaislakhti Station as the 90th and 46th cleared the Koivisto area. Just as Govorov's forces were preparing to complete the destruction of the two Finnish corps they were ordered to withdraw to avoid complete destruction. 10th Infantry and Lagus Armored Divisions were to take up reserve positions northwest of Vyborg, although the rapid penetration of 21st Army disrupted this move to some extent. Finnish V Army Corps had been transferred from the Onega-Lagoda sector took up a defense from Vyborg Bay to the Vuoksi River along with IV Corps. While the defensive position was strong, most of the Finnish forces were badly depleted.

Overnight, Govorov ordered the 21st and 23rd Armies to:

destroy the enemy Vyborg grouping and capture Vyborg no later than 20 June by developing the attack to the northwest. Reach the Antrea and Vyborg line with the [armies'] main forces no later than 21 June while reliably protecting the shock grouping's flank and rear...

The assault began early on June 20 but the attackers soon found that the city had been abandoned overnight, and it was occupied by 1900 hours, led by the 90th, the 314th, and the 372nd Rifle Division of 97th Corps, plus the 30th and 1st Guards Tank Brigades. Govorov was promoted to Marshal of the Soviet Union, and the 19th (Lt. Colonel Polyakov, Vasilii Semyonovich), 173rd (Lt. Colonel Ryabko, Ivan Fedotovich), and 286th (Lt. Colonel Khomenko, Pyotr Grigorevich) Rifle Regiments each received the city's name as a battle honor. By this time the rifle divisions of 21st Army had been reduced to from 4,000 to 6,500 personnel each.

=== Battle of Tali–Ihantala ===
The next day Govorov, just raised to the rank of marshal, submitted his new plan for continued operations into Finland. 21st and the newly-arrived 59th Army would make the main attack toward Lappeenranta and then wheel to the west to reach the line from that place to Surpiala. The first stage would last from June 22-24. Gusev would attack along the coastal axis with 110th and 108th Corps, plus 30th Guards Corps which was now released from Front reserves. In the event, due to a regrouping, four Corps were put in first echelon and 30th Guards in immediate reserve; 110th Corps was inland from 108th Corps on the coast. The overall attack front was 30km wide from the Gulf of Vyborg to south of Repola. The advance kicked off early on June 22 as planned. the 110th and 97th Corps, sharing the center of the shock grouping, penetrated about 2km into the defenses at the junction of IV and V Corps. Repeated assaults, soon assisted by 108th Corps and 109th Corps on the right, forced the Finns to pull back to new defenses anchored on the strongpoint at Repola by the end of June 24. This did not represent a decisive penetration, and after consultation with the STAVKA, Govorov altered his plan. 59th Army was to conduct an amphibious assault across the Gulf of Vyborg to outflank the defenses from the west, while 30th Guards Corps was finally brought into Gusev's first echelon.

The offensive was renewed on June 25 by three Corps, including the 108th, following another massive artillery preparation, and managed to advance 5km in 24 hours of heavy fighting. The Finns were now defending the positions they had constructed in 1940-41 between the Winter War and the Continuation War, and their forces had been further reinforced. Elements of the shock grouping approached the strongpoint of Portinkhaika late the next day. Despite this the Finns were able to seal off and contain the penetration after four more days of battle. By June 30 Gusev's forces had captured Portinkhaika and reached the outskirts of Ihantala, where better tank country could be found, but this still amounted to just 8-10km in 10 days of heavy fighting. 21st Army continued the attack through early July but made no notable gains. On July 12 Gusev was ordered to go over to the defense effective two days later. The 90th's casualties in the battles around Vyborg were so heavy that the 108th Rifle Brigade was disbanded to supply replacements.

== Tallinn Offensive ==
In August the 90th returned to 8th Army as part of the buildup to its offensive into Estonia. This began on September 17, and soon Krasnoarmeets Nikolai Ivanovich Khozyainov of the 19th Rifle Regiment distinguished himself in battle to become a Hero of the Soviet Union. Born in 1925 he had lived under German occupation near Veliky Novgorod until the area was liberated in February 1944 and he was called up to the Red Army a month later. Operating north of Tartu, on the first day his reconnaissance identified a number of firing points that were holding up the advance of his battalion, The next day he swam the Pedja River with two comrades and captured five German soldiers after a brief fight. He then took five boats which he used to ferry his prisoners across the river and which proved invaluable in his battalion's crossing operations. He personally also captured five machine guns, one 81mm mortar, and killed 14 German soldiers despite being wounded himself. Khozyainov was later promoted to the rank of senior sergeant and received his Gold Star on March 24, 1945. He lived most of the rest of his life in Leningrad and died there on April 14, 1981.

On September 20 the division took part in the capture of Jõgeva, and three days later in the capture of Pärnu. For this victory the 96th Artillery Regiment (Major Nagorskii, Boris Ivanovich) received its name as an honorific. General Lyashchenko formed a forward detachment from his mobile elements, and this advanced as far as Ainaži in Latvia by September 25. On September 30 the division, with its Corps, entered the Reserve of the Supreme High Command where it rejoined 2nd Shock Army and began travelling west toward Poland. The 90th would remain in this Army into peacetime. On October 22 the 173rd Rifle Regiment would receive the Order of the Red Banner for its role in the capture of Pärnu.

== Advance into Poland and Germany ==
2nd Shock was assigned to 2nd Belorussian Front on October 16, under command of Marshal K. K. Rokossovskii. 108th Corps now consisted of the 46th, 90th, and 372nd Divisions. In preparation for the Vistula-Oder offensive the Army was deployed on a line from the heights east of Dzierżanowo to Borsuki. When the Front's attack began on January 14, 1945, 2nd Shock Army was tasked to break out of the Różan bridgehead across the Narew River, with the immediate goal of taking the town of Ciechanów and then, in conjunction with 65th Army, to eliminate the enemy in the Pułtusk area. 108th Corps was in the Army's first echelon, and, once a breach in the German defenses had been created, would support the commitment of the 8th Guards Tank Corps. On the second day, 2nd Shock encountered powerful resistance in the form of more than 100 tanks of 7th Panzer Division backing counterattacks by 5th Jäger and 7th Infantry Divisions in a desperate effort to prevent the encirclement of the Pułtusk grouping. As a result, by the end of the day the 108th Corps gained only 1-2.5km. The situation changed overnight as the German forces began to withdraw from Pułtusk and on January 16, led by 8th Guards Tank, 2nd Shock advanced 20km. The next day the 108th and 98th Corps helped to liberate Ciechanów and were following 8th Guards Tank in the direction of Mława, cutting the highway from this fortified center to Bieżuń by the end of January 18 after a further advance of 30km. On February 19 the 173rd Rifle Regiment would be awarded the Order of Suvorov, 3rd Degree, for its part in defeating the German defenses north of Warsaw.

=== East Pomeranian Offensive ===
By February 10 the Front was engaged along a line of some 204km. 2nd Shock was holding on defense on the right banks of the Nogat and Vistula Rivers from Elbing to Zachrau, while elements of the Army were involved in street fighting in the former place. It was facing what remained of Army Group Vistula's 2nd Army. The first stage of the East Pomeranian offensive began on this date, although owing to the slower pace of 65th Army's operations the 108th Corps, on 2nd Shock's left flank, could not begin until February 16. At this time it was west of Graudenz and struck northwards along the Vistula's left bank. By February 19 the Front's advance had been halted on a line from Mewe to Czersk to Chojnice.

Rokossovskii issued directions on February 19 for 2nd Shock to hold the east bank of the Nogat with two rifle divisions and three fortified regions while its main forces were to attack toward Preussisch Stargard and Danzig in order to capture the latter city and reach a line from there to Zuchau and Karthaus by February 24. 108th Corps now also had the 37th Guards and 142nd Rifle Divisions under command, but these were committed to the ongoing siege of Graudenz. According to postwar analysis 2nd Shock had "insufficient superiority in infantry and tanks" to successfully reach Danzig. In the event, owing to the redeployment of the Front's 19th Army from reserve this second stage did not begin until February 24, and in the first two days the Front's center and right wing forces made no gains at all while fighting off counterattacks in the Mewe and Czersk area and on the Danzig axis. 19th Army and 3rd Guards Tank Corps on the left flank began to make progress on February 27 and by March 5 reached the Baltic coast and cut off 2nd Army from the rest of Germany, but during the entire period 2nd Shock had gained only 8-10km.

In the third stage, from March 6 until March 13, the Front was directed to destroy 2nd Army. Beginning on March 11 2nd Shock was to attack towards Danzig from the south, and advanced along both banks of the Vistula over the next two days before reaching the lines of its fortified area on March 13. After ten days on the defensive, 2nd Shock joined the assault on March 23, and by the end of March 26 had helped force the German Danzig group back into the city proper. Over the following days it cleared the enemy from the area between the Vistula and the Danzig–Praust railway as the city fell on March 30. In recognition of their parts in this victory, on May 17 the 17th Sapper Battalion would receive the Order of Kutuzov, 3rd Degree, while the 69th Signal Battalion was awarded the Order of the Red Star. On April 26 the 96th Artillery Regiment would receive the Order of the Red Banner and the 66th Antitank Battalion was given the Order of Alexander Nevsky, both for the capture of Dirschau and other cities earlier in the campaign.

=== Berlin Strategic Offensive ===
For the offensive into central Germany the 2nd Shock was one of four combined-arms armies deployed by 2nd Belorussian Front along the northern reaches of the Oder River. The Army deployed its shock group, consisting of the reinforced 108th Corps, along the 7km front from Wolfshorst to Inamunde, with the objective of making a forced crossing of the Waite Strewe and the Damanscher Strom Strait. The Corps had a two-echelon formation, with the 372nd in first echelon and the 90th and 46th in second. The strength of the Army's rifle divisions varied from 3,600 to 4,800 men at this time.

The crossing of the East Oder began on April 18 and over the following day German delaying forces were rounded up from the heavily flooded ground between the East and West Oder. Following an artillery preparation the latter began being forced on the morning of April 20. Over the following days the bridgehead was steadily expanded and beginning on April 26 the Front began its maneuver to outflank 3rd Panzer Army from the south and southwest. 2nd Shock and 65th Armies were tasked with advancing to the northwest to outflank the German forces operating northeast of Rostock–Neubrandenburg–Stettin before forcing them toward the Baltic coast, while also clearing Usedom and Rügen islands. 2nd Shock regrouped its 108th and 116th Rifle Corps to its left flank south of Stettin. It then attacked toward Anklam and Stralsund, while detachments crossed to Usedom from the west, and to Rugen from the south. It was reinforced with 40th Rifle Corps from 19th Army. Stettin was taken the same day by 65th Army while 108th Corps crossed the Oder south of there and by dusk had reached a line from Stolzenhagen to Daber following an advance of 5-6km. The next day it covered another 15km, reaching the line Glashutte–Krugsdorf. Through May 4-5 elements of the Corps cleared Rugen.

== Postwar ==
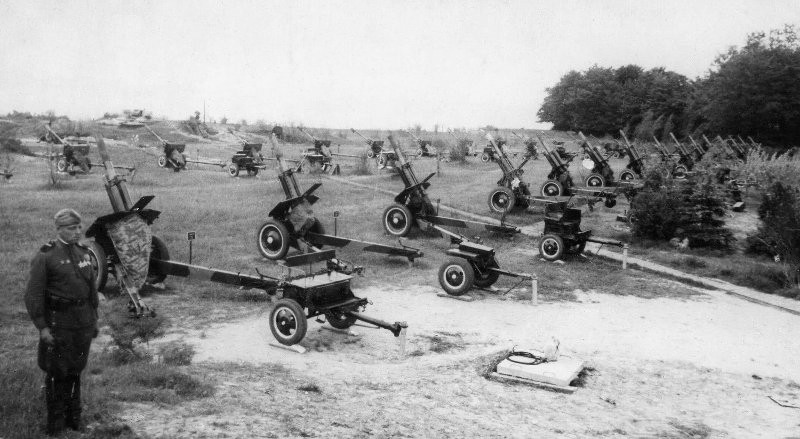
Artillery park of the 90th Rifle Division on June 4, 1945. 122 mm howitzers M1938 (M-30) and limbers in foreground.

At the time of the German surrender the division carried the full title of 90th Rifle, Ropsha, Order of the Red Banner, Order of Suvorov Division. (Russian: 90-я стрелковая Ропшинская Краснознамённая ордена Суворова дивизия.) According to STAVKA Order No. 11095 of May 29, 1945, part 2, the 90th and the remainder of 108th Corps are listed as being part of the Group of Soviet Forces in Germany. In a final round of awards on June 4 both the 286th Rifle and the 96th Artillery Regiments received the Order of Suvorov, 3rd Degree, for their roles in the capture of Stralsund and several nearby towns.

In January 1946 2nd Shock Army was disbanded, and the 90th and 46th Divisions were moved to Bryansk Oblast where they were disbanded in March. General Lyashchenko had left the 90th in February, being replaced by Maj. Gen. Vasilii Lavrentevich Alekseenko until disbandment. Lyashchenko went on to lead the 10th Mechanized Division, the 11th Guards Rifle Corps and the 12th Rifle Corps, before serving as commander-in-chief of the Volga, Turkestan, and Central Asian Military Districts until November 1977. From then until his retirement in May 1992 he was an inspector-counsellor in the Group of Inspector-Generals of the Ministry of Defence. He reached the rank of army general on February 22, 1968, and was made a Hero of the Soviet Union on October 4, 1990.
