= 125th Rifle Division =

125th Rifle Division (August 19, 1939 – July 1945)
- Active: 1939–1945
- Country: Soviet Union
- Branch: Red Army (1939-46)
- Type: Infantry
- Size: Division
- Engagements: Operation Barbarossa; Baltic operation Leningrad strategic defensive Siege of Leningrad; Leningrad–Novgorod offensive Krasnoye Selo–Ropsha offensive Kingisepp–Gdov offensive Battle of Narva (1944); Tallinn offensive Sandomierz–Silesian offensive Upper Silesian offensive Prague offensive
- Decorations: Order of the Red Banner; Order of Kutuzov
- Battle honours: Krasnoye Selo

Commanders
- Notable commanders: Maj. Gen. Pavel Petrovich Bogaychuk; Maj. Gen. Ivan Ivanovich Fadeev; Col. Vasilii Kondratevich Zinovev

The 125th Rifle Division was formed as an infantry division of the Red Army on August 19, 1939, in the Urals Military District, based on the shtat (table of organization and equipment) of the following month. After a short stay in the far north it was moved to western Belarus in April 1940 and by the start of Operation Barbarossa it had been assigned to 8th Army in what was soon named Northwestern Front. It was directly in the path of part of 4th Panzer Group but managed to escape encirclement and retreated through Lithuania and Estonia through July and August, suffering heavy casualties in the process. After escaping encirclement near Tartu it continued falling back toward Leningrad, helping to form the Oranienbaum Bridgehead before being transferred into the defenses of the city itself, now as part of Leningrad Front's 55th Army. Under this command it took part in several abortive efforts to break the siege in the Kolpino area from October to December, during which its original commander was killed. During 1942 and 1943 it was engaged in holding the lines, mostly as part of 42nd Army, until January 1944 when it took part in the final offensive to drive Army Group North away from the city, quickly winning a battle honor and then the Order of the Red Banner, the latter as part of 2nd Shock Army. It then came up against the defenses of the city of Narva, and was moved from 2nd Shock to 59th Army to 8th Army during this lengthy battle. After a period of rebuilding in Leningrad Front reserves it returned to 2nd Shock for the renewed offensive into Estonia, during which several of its subunits received distinctions for the capture of Tallinn. Following this, it was removed to the Reserve of the Supreme High Command and reassigned to 21st Army, which reinforced 1st Ukrainian Front prior to the winter offensive into Poland and Germany. The 125th saw extensive service in Silesia, winning the Order of Kutuzov, while its subunits also received several decorations. At the time of the German surrender it was advancing toward Prague. The division was disbanded in July.

== Formation ==
The division was formed at Kirov in the Urals Military District on August 19, 1939. Kombrig Pavel Petrovich Bogaychuk, who had recently graduated from the Frunze Military Academy while also serving as deputy commandant for combat training, Sverdlovsk Infantry School, was given command the same day; he would have his rank modernized to that of major general on June 5, 1940. In February 1940 the division began moving by rail to Arkhangelsk, where it came under the SGK Reserve, but was soon moved again to western Belarus, with its headquarters at Pinsk. At the start of the German invasion on June 22, 1941, it was part of 8th Army's 11th Rifle Corps in the Baltic Special Military District (soon redesignated as Northwestern Front). At this time its order of battle was as follows:

- 466th Rifle Regiment
- 657th Rifle Regiment
- 749th Rifle Regiment
- 414th Light Artillery Regiment
- 459th Howitzer Artillery Regiment (until September 21, 1941)
- 183rd Antitank Battalion (from June 22 to September 21, 1941, then from January 14, 1942)
- 348th Antiaircraft Battery (later 345th Battalion, until May 25, 1943)
- 390th Mortar Battalion (from October 17, 1941, until August 15, 1942)
- 196th Machine Gun Battalion (from August 17, 1942, until May 25, 1943)
- 165th Reconnaissance Battalion [included a company of light tanks] (later 165th Company)
- 189th Sapper Battalion
- 191st Signal Battalion (later 204th Signal Battalion, 204th Signal Company)
- 147th Medical/Sanitation Battalion
- 272nd Chemical Defense (Anti-gas) Company (later 125th)
- 210th Motor Transport Company (later 206th)
- 331st Field Bakery (later 126th)
- 22nd Divisional Veterinary Hospital
- 70th Divisional Artillery Workshop
- 996th Field Postal Station (later 853rd)
- 678th Field Office of the State Bank

At this time it was on the left-center of its Army, tying into its Corps-mate, the 48th Rifle Division, on its left, and the 90th Rifle Division of 10th Rifle Corps on the right, well to the west of Raseiniai. General Bogaychuk had his headquarters southwest of Batakiai, with elements of the division spread along the German border on the line Pagramantis–Tauragė–Gaurė–Skaudvilė, a line up to 40km in length. This placed it directly in the path of XXXXI Motorized Corps and the 269th Infantry Division. The division had the 51st Corps Artillery Regiment in support.

The District commander, Col. Gen. F. I. Kuznetsov, had disregarded the instructions of the NKO and General Staff to avoid any action that might be taken as a provocation. On June 15, alarmed by intelligence reports of the German buildup, issued orders to increase force readiness along the frontier. Without directly mentioning the buildup he stated, "Today, as never before, we must be fully combat ready. Many commanders do not understand this. But all must firmly and clearly understand that at any moment we must be ready to fulfill any combat mission." After receiving further intelligence two days later Kuznetsov ordered his forces to full military readiness on June 18. While his actions were brave in going against orders from the top and militarily correct, it's unlikely that they made any real difference when the war began.

General Bogaychuk fully concurred with Kuznetsov's directives and did his best to prepare his soldiers. On July 21 he issued his own orders to place mines on the roads, bridges, and probable approach routes of tanks, while also strengthening security and increasing reconnaissance measures. These actions enhanced the resistance of the 125th in the opening days.

== Baltic Operation ==
The invasion began with an artillery preparation at 0310 hours. In the initial hours the 90th Division was partially surrounded and its commander was killed in action. The 48th, with its main forces marching from the Riga area, had only forward detachments near the frontier, leaving the 125th to hold the line largely alone. Overnight the 1st and 6th Panzer Divisions had crossed the Neman River without being detected by Soviet intelligence and went over to the attack after just five minutes of artillery fire. However, according to Colonel Ritgen of 6th Panzer,

Enemy resistance in our sector turned out to be much stronger than expected. Our path was obstructed by six anti-tank ditches, covered by infantry and snipers hiding in trees. Fortunately for us, they had no anti-tank artillery or mines. Since none would surrender, we took no prisoners. Nevertheless, our tanks soon ran out of ammo - something that had never happened in the Polish and French campaigns. Replenishment of ammo depended on trucks stuck in a jam somewhere in the rear.

Another senior officer of 6th Panzer, E. Raus, noted that after crossing the border south of Tauragė and clearing the village of Siline one of his combat groups reached "a forest east of this place, [where] two Russian companies put up an exceptionally strong fight. Our infantry managed to neutralize the last pocket of resistance only at 16.00 hours, after a fierce action in the forest." Meanwhile, the 48th was caught on the march and suffered 70 percent casualties to armor and air attacks. By contrast, Sr. Lt. Kolegaev's artillery battalion of the 414th Regiment was credited with 30 panzers destroyed, and the battery of Lt. Yatsenko accounted for another seven.

1st Panzer, on the left flank of the 6th, attacked straight off the march and reached Tauragė by 1300 hours, where it took a pair of bridges over the Jūra River. However, the town was defended by the 657th Regiment, under command of Major Georgievskii, and street fighting soon erupted, eventually requiring the panzer pioneers to employ flamethrowers and demolition charges. By 2400 the remaining defenders had been forced into the northeastern outskirts. The 749th had fallen back to a line held by the 9th Antitank Artillery Brigade by evening, while the 466th, having suffered some 40 percent losses, was reorganizing near Skaudvilė. During the next day the division, along with 9th Antitank, plus survivors of the 48th and the 2nd Tank Division, fought with some success near Raseiniai before the 125th withdrew under orders toward Šiauliai.

By July 1 the division had crossed to the north bank of the Daugava River, with some 700 "bayonets" (riflemen and sappers) still on strength. A strength return on July 4 broke this down as:

- 466th Regiment - 210 men, one 45mm antitank gun, three heavy machine guns;
- 657th Regiment - 185 men, two 76mm regimental guns, one antiaircraft machine gun, two heavy machine guns;
- 749th Regiment - 250 men, one 76mm gun, eight mortars, two antiaircraft machine guns;
- 414th Light Artillery Regiment - 35 men, one 76mm cannon;
- 459th Howitzer Artillery Regiment - eight guns total;
- 165th Reconnaissance Battalion - 15 men, two tankettes.

A week later the situation had improved considerably. Bogaychuk reported to 11th Corps that the division had a total of 3,145 personnel, armed with 53 machine guns of all types, seven 45mm antitank guns, plus 22 other guns and mortars. At the time this was above average for Northwestern Front, where most rifle divisions had less than 2,000 troops.

=== Leningrad strategic defensive ===
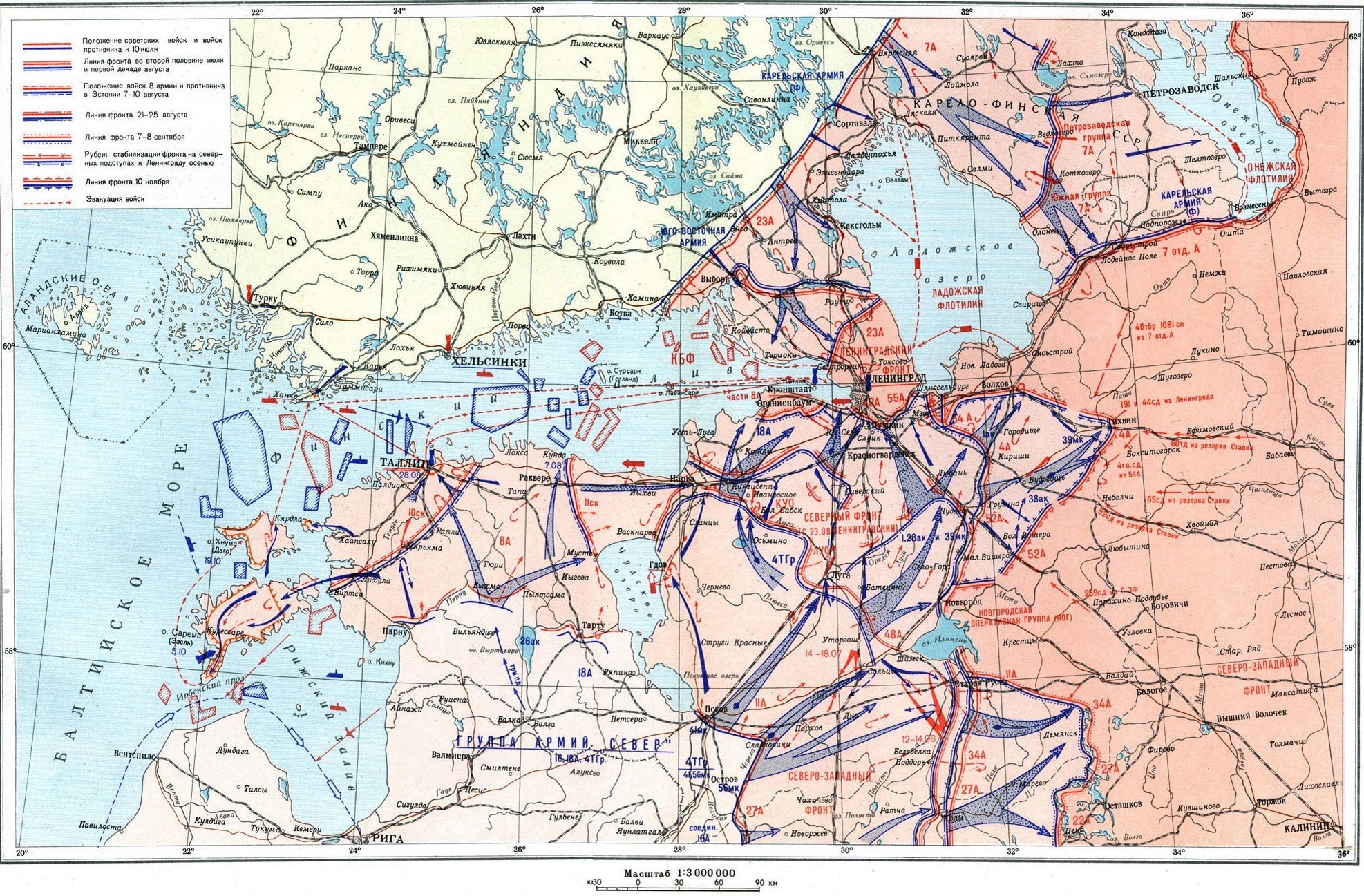
Leningrad strategic defensive, July 10 - November 10, 1941

By July 9 the division had been forced back to the north bank of the Emajõgi River, where it took up defensive positions. German attacks were renewed on July 22 and 11th Corps found itself encircled before breaking out near Tartu two days later. By August 1 8th Army had been subordinated to Northern Front (as of August 27 Leningrad Front), and 11th Corps was disbanded on August 15. What remained of the 125th retreated through Narva and along the south coast of the Gulf of Finland. Starting on August 16 and for the next six days the XXXXI Corps struck repeatedly at the approaches to the fortified region around Krasnogvardeisk, but was unable to crack the defenses. In the same period infantry forces of Army Group North took Kingisepp, forcing 8th Army back to the west bank of the Luga River by August 21. The Army commander, Lt. Gen. P. S. Pshennikov, reported that his five divisions had lost all their regimental and battalion commanders in this fighting.

The Army remained a sizable threat to the left flank of XXXXI Corps, and the Army Group suspended the attacks at Krasnogvardeisk until 18th Army could deal with the situation. This took the form of a combined attack by XXVI and XXVIII Army Corps toward the Gulf during August 22-25. By September 1 this had pushed 8th Army back to new defenses south of Oranienbaum, forming a bridgehead that Soviet forces would hold until 1944. Between August 21 and September 9 the 18th Army took 9,774 prisoners while capturing or destroying 60 tanks and 77 artillery pieces. Despite this shambles 8th Army held. On September 8 German forces captured Shlisselburg to the east of Leningrad, cutting land communications from the city to the rest of the USSR. The following day Army Gen. G. K. Zhukov took command of Leningrad Front.

== Siege of Leningrad ==
On September 22 Hitler issued a directive that the Wehrmacht would wipe out the city by starvation, artillery fire and air bombing. As of October 1 the city was now held by the 55th and 42nd Armies plus the Neva Operational Group. 55th Army, under command of Maj. Gen. I. G. Lazarev, was deployed on a 30km-wide sector from east of Pulkovo to the Neva River at Putrolovo.

=== First and Second Sinyavino Offensives ===
On October 1 the 125th was moved east into the Leningrad defenses, joining 55th Army near Kolpino. It was soon assigned to the Eastern Sector Operational Group, formed by Maj. Gen. I. I. Fedyuninskii from 55th Army and Front reserves. This Group consisted of five rifle divisions, two tank brigades and one battalion, and supporting artillery. It was intended to assault across the Neva on a 5km-wide sector between Peski and Nevskaya Dubrovka, advance toward Sinyavino, and help encircle and destroy the German forces south of Shlisselburg in conjunction with 54th Army advancing from the east, effectively lifting the siege. German action preempted the Soviet attack as they began a thrust toward Tikhvin on October 16. Nevertheless, the STAVKA insisted that the attack proceed as planned on October 20, but it made little progress.

On the last day of October the new commander of the Front, Lt. Gen. M. S. Khozin, presented plans for a two-phase operation to retake Sinyavino, Mga, and Tosno before cutting the Shlisselburg corridor. This was to be led by the Neva Operational Group, while 55th Army was to join in on November 2 with a total of seven rifle divisions and a tank brigade. The four divisions in first echelon were to capture Ust'-Tosno and two other villages before taking bridgeheads over the Tosno River. By November 6 the three divisions in second echelon, including the 125th, were to exploit toward Mga Station to support 54th Army. Following this the combined 55th, 54th, and 8th Armies would take Tosno and break the blockade. The first echelon struck the German 96th Infantry Division but made little impression at the cost of heavy casualties. On November 9 Khozin presented a revised plan which would involve 40 medium and heavy tanks plus three fresh volunteer rifle regiments. This effort began the same day with much the same results. After November 11 the 125th and three other divisions, with a pair of tank battalions, were committed, to no avail. 54th Army, in the event, was tied down by the German advance on Tikhvin and was unable to cooperate. The entire operation was a bloody failure, and, among other changes, General Lazarev was removed from command of 55th Army, being replaced by Lt. Gen. V. P. Sviridov.

During the fighting since September Lt. Nikolai Andreevich Kozlov had repeatedly distinguished himself in combat. On September 1, serving as deputy chief of staff of the 749th Rifle Regiment and also leading a rifle company, he personally killed or wounded up to 40 German soldiers near Kingisepp while also procuring valuable intelligence. He was soon put in command of a battalion. In the October and November fighting near Kolpino he inflicted additional casualties while also being present at crisis points and leading bayonet charges. On November 15, finding a commanding position and arming himself with a light machine gun, he accounted for an additional 30 German casualties. He received several wounds in this fighting, but insisted on returning to his unit, even after losing three fingers from his right hand in late December. On February 6, 1942, Kozlov was made a Hero of the Soviet Union. He would be transferred to the 185th Rifle Regiment of the 224th Rifle Division and be promoted to the rank of major before being mortally wounded on October 10, 1943. He was buried in Leningrad.

In this late December fighting General Bogaychuk was killed with several members of his staff. The division was assaulting a strong fortified position near Kolpino without adequate artillery or air support. The battle for one feature called the "2nd Antitank Ditch" continued for several days before it was finally taken. German losses were fairly high, but the 125th lost as much as 50 percent of its strength. Bogaychuk died on December 21; in 1965 he was posthumously awarded the Order of the Patriotic War, 1st Degree. He was replaced on December 26 by Maj. Gen. Ivan Ivanovich Fadeev, who had been leading the 35th Rifle Regiment of the 44th Rifle Division. At the start of the German invasion he had been in command of the 10th Rifle Division, leading it back to Leningrad from the frontier, but in early September he retreated 1.5km without orders. He was arrested, tried, and sentenced to seven years in prison, suspended for the duration of the war. His sentence would be commuted during his service in the 125th.

In early 1942 the division was reorganized as per the shtat of December 6, 1941, and it would spend the rest of that year and all of 1943 holding along the Neva. In June it was moved to the Front reserves, where it remained until August when it was assigned to 42nd Army.

== Leningrad-Novgorod Offensive ==
In preparation for the upcoming winter offensive on November 10, 1943, the 125th, still in 42nd Army, was assigned to the new 109th Rifle Corps, under command of Maj. Gen. I. P. Alferov, joining the 72nd and 109th Rifle Divisions.

=== Krasnoye Selo-Ropsha Offensive ===
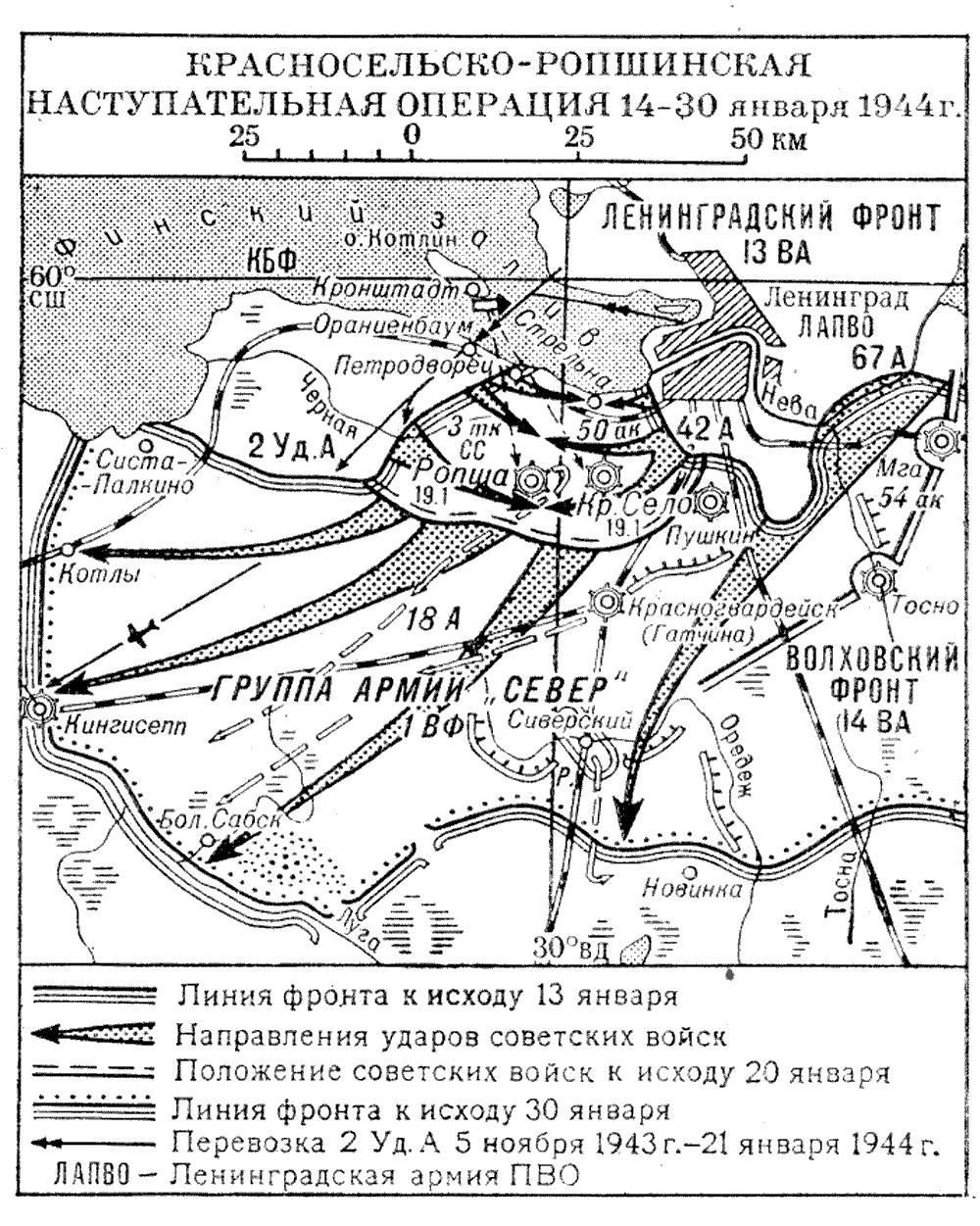
Krasnoye Selo-Ropsha Offensive. Note positions of 42nd and 2nd Shock Armies.

The offensive which finally drove Army Group away from Leningrad began with a powerful artillery preparation at 0935 hours on January 14. The heaviest fire from 42nd Army came from Pulkovo, but this was mainly intended to tie down the defenders. The next morning an even heavier bombardment, totaling of more than 220,000 shells, also began at 0935. The infantry assault stepped off at 1100 against three divisions of the German L Army Corps. On this second day the 30th Guards Rifle Corps in the center penetrated to a depth of 4km on a 5km front, but the 109th and 110th Rifle Corps on its flanks were less successful, gaining only about 1.5km, gnawing their way through heavy defenses in costly successive assaults.

During January 16 the 42nd Army painfully advanced another 3-4km, mainly on the sector of the 30th Guards Corps. By the end of the next day the German forces were being threatened with encirclement as only about 18km separated 42nd Army from 2nd Shock Army attacking from the Oranienbaum Bridgehead. In the evening of January 19 the two Armies linked up at Russko-Vysotskoye after capturing Krasnoye Selo and Ropsha respectively. For its role in this victory the division was awarded a battle honor:

KRASNOYE SELO... 125th Rifle Division (Major General Fadeev, Ivan Ivanovich)... The troops that participated in breaking the enemy's defenses and liberating Krasnoye Selo and Ropsha, by the order of the Supreme High Command on 19 January 1944, and by a commendation in Moscow, are given a salute of 20 artillery salvoes from 224 guns.

Within days 109th Corps was transferred to 2nd Shock Army, which was commanded by General Fedyuninskii.

=== Advance on Kingisepp ===
By January 23 the westward offensive toward Kingisepp was developing across a broad front. The commander of Army Group North was desperately asking for permission to withdraw at least to the Luga Defense Line, but this was denied. During January 25-26 the 109th Corps, in cooperation with 43rd Rifle Corps, advanced up to 16km. After reaching the Kingisepp–Krasnogvardeysk railroad on January 27, 2nd Shock wheeled to the west and began pursuing XXVI Army Corps toward Kingisepp. On February 4, in recognition of its overall successes in the offensive, the 125th was awarded the Order of the Red Banner.

== Battle of Narva ==
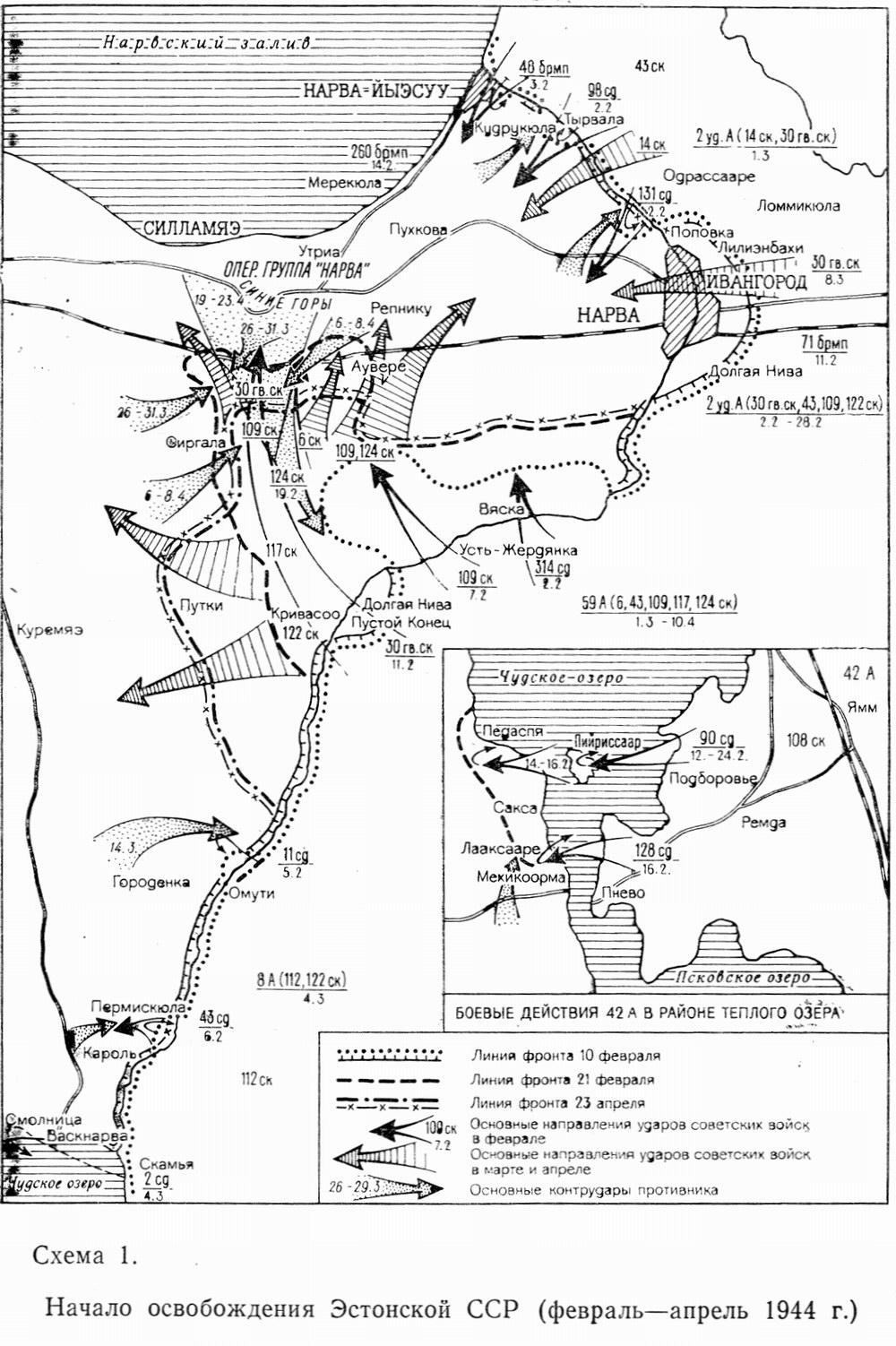
Battle of Narva, February 2 - April 23, 1944. Note location of 109th Rifle Corps.

On January 29 the commander of Leningrad Front, Army Gen. L. A. Govorov, ordered 2nd Shock and 42nd Armies to force the Luga prior to clearing the south shore of the Gulf of Finland, then reach and establish bridgeheads over the Narva River prior to an advance into Estonia. This advance began on February 1 and, after a 15-minute artillery preparation, initially made rapid progress. While 109th Corps took Kingisepp the 43rd and 122nd Rifle Corps pushed on to the Narva, taking lodgements north and south of the Narva fortress respectively. In light of this success Govorov transferred the 30th Guards Corps to Fedyuninskii's command. With this assistance he was to widen and deepen his bridgeheads, break the defense west of the river, envelop and take Narva. This would be assisted by the Baltic Fleet landing the 115th and 260th Naval Infantry Brigades in the German rear. The line was defended by the III SS Panzer Corps, which was armored in name only.

2nd Shock battled for a week to destroy III SS Corps with little success. A new plan was approved by Govorov and the fighting was renewed on February 11 but fell well short of its objectives. 43rd Corps advanced up to 2km on a 4km-wide front but was halted by the 227th Infantry Division and the SS Nederland Brigade. Southwest of Narva the 109th and 122nd Corps managed to gain 12km to the west and northwest over five days of combat before also being forced to a standstill by 11th SS Panzergrenadier Division "Nordland", 170th Infantry Division, and Panzergrenadier Division "Feldherrnhalle". 30th Guards Corps managed to cut the road and railroad from Iykhvi to Narva on February 15 and captured Auvere two days later before being stopped by counterattacks. The amphibious landing on the night of February 13/14 was a minor disaster with only 432 naval infantry reaching land without communications to the Fleet and, therefore, without any supporting fire. A pair of German combat groups would destroy this force over four days of fighting. Due to its heavy losses the 125th was partly replenished with the personnel of the 48th Naval Rifle Brigade.

On February 14 the STAVKA signaled that Narva must be taken by the end of February 17 "for military as well as political reasons." Fedyuninskii now reinforced the southern bridgehead with two more rifle corps, but this made little difference in the face of significant German reinforcements; on February 23 this grouping was named Operational Group Narva, and it would continue to hold through the rest of the winter and the following spring. During the next battle, from February 17–28, the southern bridgehead was expanded, and 109th Corps was moved to 59th Army toward the end of this period, but Narva was not cut off. By now all of Govorov's forces were considerably weakened, but he called for a concentrated attack on March 1. 43rd and 109th Corps attacked at dawn after a 20-minute artillery preparation, but this was inadequate and the Soviet force struck heavy resistance, especially at Sirgala and Putki. Following powerful counterattacks the fighting would continue on 59th Army's front until April 8 in a bloody stalemate. On April 24 General Fadeev was reassigned to command of the 6th Rifle Corps, which he would lead until December. He was replaced by Col. Vasilii Kondratevich Zinovev, who would lead the 125th for the duration of the war.

By the beginning of April the division had returned to 2nd Shock, but later in the month it was reassigned to 6th Corps in 8th Army. In May, 6th Corps was moved to 59th Army, then in June the 125th left for the Front reserves for rest and reinforcements. While there it was available for the Vyborg–Petrozavodsk offensive, but it did not actually see combat. As of August 1 it was back in 109th Corps of 2nd Shock Army for the start of the renewed offensive into Estonia.

=== Tallinn Offensive ===
The offensive began on September 17, by which time the 125th was in 117th Rifle Corps, still in 2nd Shock. Finland had exited the war on September 3, removing most of the rationale for Army Group North to remain in Estonia. The Estonian capital was abandoned by German forces on September 22 as part of an orderly retreat that Leningrad Front was unable to disrupt. In recognition of their roles in the capture of the city the 466th Rifle Regiment (Lt. Colonel Pushnenkov, Vasilii Porfirievich) received "Tallinn" as an honorific, while a month later the 657th Rifle Regiment would be decorated with the Order of Kutuzov, 3rd Degree, and the 749th Rifle and 414th Artillery Regiments would each be awarded the Order of Alexander Nevsky. By October 1 the division, with 117th Corps, had been withdrawn to 21st Army in the Reserve of the Supreme High Command for redeployment. The 125th would remain in this Army for the duration of the war.

== Into Germany and Czechoslovakia ==
21st Army, under command of Col. Gen. D. N. Gusev, was transferred to 1st Ukrainian Front in December. At this time the 117th Corps consisted of the 125th, 72nd, and 120th Rifle Divisions. At the start of the Vistula-Oder Offensive on January 12, 1945, the Army was in the Front's reserve and did not see combat until January 17, when it was committed to the fighting for the Silesian industrial area. By January 28 this area had been cleared and 117th Corps was fighting for a bridgehead south of Oppeln on a 30km-wide front. Starting on January 31, Gusev was ordered to expand the bridgehead over the Oder River and reach the Neisse River by the end of February 1. This was intended to clear all German forces between the two rivers. The first effort by 55th Rifle Corps made little progress. The offensive was renewed on February 3, with 117th Corps rolling up the German front to the southwest and south. By the second day a combined bridgehead of 21st and 5th Guards Army some 80km wide and 25km deep had been created. On April 5 the division would be recognized for its success in forcing the Oder with the Order of Kutuzov, 2nd Degree.

Following this success the next stage of the offensive would be the encirclement of Breslau by the 21st, 5th Guards, and 6th Armies. A regrouping took place from February 8-12 during which the 117th Corps, after being relieved by 59th Army, was pulled out and moved to 21st Army's right flank; this allowed the 117th and 118th Corps to concentrate as a shock group. The former was focused on an 4km-wide sector with two divisions in first echelon and the other in second. The offensive was renewed on February 13 and gained up to 10km by the end of February 15 but thereafter slowed significantly due to the presence of significant defensive forces in the area southwest of Breslau. 21st Army would require a break to restore its offensive capabilities. At least some of the Front's rifle divisions by now were reduced to roughly 3,000 personnel. By the end of the month the 125th was operating under direct Army command.

=== Upper Silesian Offensive ===
At the beginning of March there was still a large German grouping holding a salient stretching eastward nearly to Oppeln and this was the target for a new drive by 21st, 59th, 60th, and 5th Guards Armies, plus 4th Tank Army. 21st Army formed a shock group which was to attack in the direction of Priborn with the objective of reaching Münsterberg by the end of the second day, in cooperation with the 34th Guards Rifle and the 4th Guards Tank Corps. Gusev would commit eight rifle divisions, five of which would be in the first echelon. By March 10 the 125th had returned to 117th Corps, where it would remain for the duration. The inner flanks of 118th and 117th Corps were concentrated on a 6km-wide sector from the Grottkau–Neisse railroad to Mertzdorf. The commander of 117th Corps, Maj. Gen. V. A. Trubachev, placed the 125th and 72nd Divisions in first echelon, with the 120th in second. The objective for the first day, in co-operation with 4th Tank Army's 10th Tank Corps, was to reach Neisse at Rothaus with its forward detachments. By the third day, after committing the 120th, it was intended to take the area Deutsch Wette–Neustadt–Altstadt and link up with 59th Army.

21st Army's part in the offensive began at 0600 hours on March 15 with an attack by its forward battalions, followed by the main forces at 1020. The 125th's battalion was directed toward Schwartzergrund. The forward battalions followed on the heels of a 10-minute artillery onslaught and units of the 117th and 118th Corps quickly seized their first objectives; these attacks were so successful that General Gusev ordered the artillery preparation for the main forces shortened to 40 minutes, but this proved a mistake and caused the advance to slow later in the day. Overnight the German forces facing 21st and 4th Tank Armies were reinforced by the 10th Panzergrenadier and 19th Panzer Divisions and during March 16 the Soviet Armies had to repel numerous counterattacks. Despite this, elements of 117th Corps managed to advance up to 10km during the day.

The next day the 120th Division, along with 10th Tanks, reached the Neisse in the Rothaus–Mansdorf area, completing the penetration of the German defenses, and on March 18 the 117th and 55th Corps advanced another 15km, capturing 55 towns and villages, and finally linking up with 59th Army near Neustadt, completing the encirclement. Over the next two days the pocket would be eliminated, while the 120th beat off breakout attempts by the encircled forces, led by up to three infantry division with armor support. On April 26 the 466th and 657th Rifle Regiments and the 183rd Antitank Battalion would all be awarded the Order of Alexander Nevsky for their roles in eliminating the German grouping southwest of Oppeln.

With the conclusion of the encirclement battle the 21st and 4th Guards Tanks were ordered to continue advancing westward in the direction of the town of Neisse. The 117th Corps was to attack with two divisions on a sector of 11km and take the northern and eastern parts of the town. The attack began with 45 minutes of artillery preparation in a well planned programme. It went ahead at 0810 hours on March 23, and the 117th and 55th Corps took the town late the next day. On March 27, the Front command ordered Gusev to cease offensive operations and consolidate along the east bank of the Bila River. On April 26 the 414th Artillery Regiment received the Order of Bogdan Khmelnitsky, 2nd Degree, for its role in the fighting for Neisse.

21st Army began advancing toward Prague on May 7 and the 125th captured Striegau the same day. Three days later the fighting ended.

== Postwar ==
When the shooting stopped the men and women of the division shared the full title of 125th Rifle, Krasnoye Selo, Order of the Red Banner, Order of Kutuzov Division. (Russian: 125-я стрелковая Красносельская Краснознамённая ордена Кутузова дивизия.) According to STAVKA Order No. 11096 of May 29, part 8, 117th Corps and the 125th were listed as among those to be "disbanded in place". In accordance to this directive the division was disbanded in July.
