= 8th Army (Soviet Union) =

- 8-я армия
- Active: 1939–1945
- Country: Soviet Union
- Branch: Red Army
- Type: Combined arms
- Size: Field army 100,000+ (organized into corps)
- Part of: Leningrad Front
- Engagements: Winter War, Operation Barbarossa, Baltic Operation, Leningrad Strategic Defensive; Siege of Leningrad, Battle of Narva

The 8th Army (Russian: 8-я армия) was a field army of the Soviet Red Army during the Second World War.

== Winter War ==
The 8th Army was formed in October 1939 (or 14 September 1939) from the Novgorod Army Operational Group of the Leningrad Military District with the task of providing security of the Northwestern borders of the USSR. (The Novgorod Group had been created a month before, on 13 August 1939 by the order No. 0129 of the Chairman of the People's Commissariat for Defence, Marshal of the Soviet Union K.E. Voroshilov. The Group was created for operations in Estonia and Latvia.)

On 30 November 1939 the Soviet Union attacked Finland in the Winter War. The strength of the 8th Army, or overall the Red Army, in the north of Lake Ladoga (Ladoga Karelia), surprised the Finnish general staff. The Finns deployed only two divisions, and they had a support group of three brigades, bringing their total strength to over 30,000 uniforms. The Soviets had a division for almost all roads leading west to the Finnish border. The Eighth Army was led by Ivan Khabarov, but on 13 December he was replaced by Grigori Shtern. The Vice Commander of the Southern Group was Vladimir Kurdyumov from December 1939, who later was appointed the Vice Commander of the 15th Army.

The mission was to destroy the Finnish troops in the area of Ladoga Karelia and advance to the area between Sortavala and Joensuu within ten days. The Soviets had the advantage of a three-to-one ratio in men, five-to-one in artillery and also air supremacy.

The Finnish troops conducted a pre-planned retreat before the overwhelming opposition. On 7 December, in middle of the Ladoga Karelian front, the Finns retreated near the small stream of Kollaa. The waterway itself did not offer any protection, but alongside there were ridges up to ten meters. The battle of Kollaa lasted until the end of war. Up to north the Finns retreated from Ägläjärvi to Tolvajärvi on 5 December, and defeated Soviet attacks by the 139th Rifle Division and 75th Rifle Division in the battle of Tolvajärvi on 12 December.

In the south, two Soviet divisions were united on the northern side of the coastal road of Lake Ladoga. As before, these divisions were in a trap as the Finns could make counterattacks from a north to columns flank. The Finns made counterattacks in all fronts but were not successful – however the Red Army was now facing a position of defence rather than attack. On 19 December the Finns temporarily ceased their assaults as the soldiers were exhausted. It was not until the period 6 to 16 January 1940 that the Finns made another major offensive, and cut the Soviet division into a smaller group of different sized mottis.

Contrary to Finnish expectation, the encircled Soviets divisions did not try to break through to the east but instead they stayed put and entrenched themselves. The Soviets were expecting auxiliary troops and service shipments support to arrive by the air. However, the Finns repelled all efforts of the Soviet Eighth Army to resupply the encircled troops, and they did not get enough supplies from the air. As the Finns lacked the necessary heavy artillery equipment and were short of men, they did not directly attack the mottis they had created, but instead focussed on eliminating the most dangerous threats only and bide their time.

== Eastern Front ==
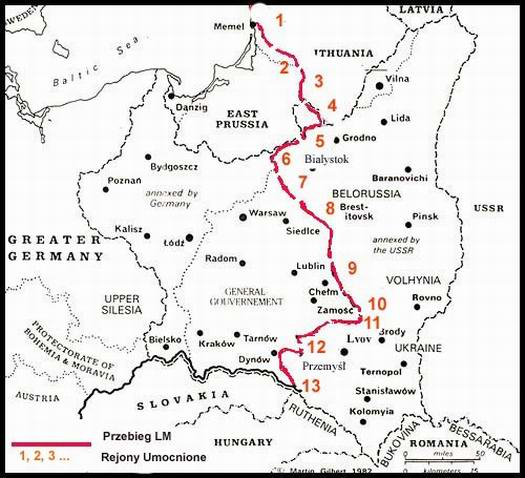
Fortified Regions, (1939–41) of the Molotov Line, 1. Telšiai, 2. Šiauliai, 3. Kaunas, 4. Alytus, 5. Grodno, 6. Osowiec, 7. Zambrów, 8. Brest, 9. Kovel, 10. Volodymyr-Volyns'kyi, 11. Kamyanka-Buzka, 12. Rawa Ruska, 13. Przemyśl.

In 1940 the Army became a part of the Baltic Special Military District.

From the morning of 22 June 1941 as part of the Northwestern Front the army (10th Rifle Corps with 10th, 48th, and 90th Rifle Divisions and 11th Rifle Corps with 11th Rifle Division and 125th Rifle Division, 12th Mechanised Corps, 47th, 51st, and 74th Corps Artillery Regiments, and 9th Anti-Tank Artillery Brigade and a number of other units) joined the heavy fighting with superior forces of the German Wehrmacht on the Šiauliai axis.

On 23–25 June its 12th Mechanised Corps with the part of the 3rd Mechanised Corps of the 11th Army southwest of Shyaulyaya executed a counterblow on the forces of the enemy's Panzer Group 4, as a result of which their advance was delayed by several days. After 30 June the 22nd Motor Rifle Division NKVD started operating as part of 10th Rifle Corps. (Glantz, SC, 175)

During July–August the troops of the 8th Army conducted persistent defensive actions in the territory of Estonia. On 14 July, the army was transferred to the Northern Front, and on 27 August of the Leningrad Front. In the beginning of September 1941 the army's troops fought on the neighboring approaches to Leningrad, retaining contact with the forces of the Red Banner Baltic Fleet on the Oranienbaum bridgehead which played an important role in the Siege of Leningrad. At the beginning of November, the Army headquarters and some formations and units of the 8th Army were relocated into the eastern sector of the defence of the Leningrad Front and to the bridgehead on the Neva River in Moskovskaya Dubrovka (Nevsky Pyatachok). During November- December, they conducted persistent offensive combat for achieving Leningrad blockade break-through.

At the end of January 1942 the administration of the army, crossed on Lake Ladoga ice to the Volkhov direction, combined formations and units for the Sinyavino operations group of 54th Army, which occupied defenses from the south coast of Ladoga lake to the Kirov railroad. On 9 June, the army was subordinated to the Volkhov Front. In August- September, it acted as a part of the Front's assault group for the Sinyavino Offensive (1942).

During January 1943, the 8th Army participated in the Leningrad blockade break-through, covering the southern flank of the Front's assault group. During July–August it conducted furious fighting in the 1st Mga Offensive.

During January 1944, the army headquarters and its support units were moved between Novgorod and Lake Peipus. 119th Rifle Corps with 286th and 374th Rifle Divisions was established within the Army in November 1943.

After accepting new formations, the Army participated in the Novgorod-Luga Offensive Operation. After regrouping as part of the Leningrad Front (from 16 February), the Army made several attempts to encircle the German Army Group Narwa in the battle for Narva Bridgehead. After the failure to do so, the army took up defensive positions in late March to July. The Army participated in the Narva Offensive (July 1944) and the Battle of Tannenberg Line, 25 July to 10 August 1944. During September in cooperation with the 2nd Shock Army and the Baltic Fleet, the army conducted the Tallinn Offensive, as a result of which, mainland Estonia and the capital Tallinn were captured.

In October–November the army together with the Baltic Fleet conducted the Moonsund Landing Operation to capture the West Estonian archipelago (Moonsund archipelago).

From December 1944, the Army carried out coastal defence tasks in Estonia to the end of the war.

In September 1945, the Army was disbanded by being redesignated HQ Western Siberian Military District in Novosibirsk.

== Commanding officers ==
- I.N. Khabarov (13 September - 13 December 1939);
- G.M. Shtern (13 December 1939 - June 1940)
- Lieutenant General Konstantin Pyadyshev, (June 1940 - July 1940)
- Lieutenant General Aleksandr Tyurin, (July 1940 - 11 March 1941)
- Major General Pyotr Sobennikov (11 March - 30 June 1941);
- lieutenant general Fedor Sergeevich Ivanov (30 June – 24 July 1941);
- Major General Lyubovtsev I.M. (24 July - 6 August 1941);
- lieutenant general Pyotr Pshennikov (7 August - 1 September 1941);
- Major General Vladimir Shcherbakov (1 - 24 September 1941.);
- lieutenant general Trifon Shevaldin (24 September - 28 November 1941);
- Colonel, since October 1941. Major General Andrei Bondarev (28 November 1941 - 28 January 1942);
- Major General Alexander Sukhomlin (28 January - 22 April 1942);
- Major General, since November 1942 Lieutenant General Filipp Starikov (22 April 1942 - to the end of the war).

Members of the military council:

- divisional commissar Shabalov S.I. (June July 1941.);
- divisional commissar Chukhnov I.F. (July- September 1941);
- the brigade commissar Okorokov A.D. (September 1941. - April 1942.);
- brigade commissar, December 1942. divisional commissar Sosnovikov V.V. (May- December 1942);
- Major General Zubov V.A. (December 1942. - to the end of the war).

Chiefs of staff :

- Major General Larionov G.A. (1940 - August 1941.);
- Colonel Smirnov V.I. (August- September 1941);
- Major General Kokorev P.I. (September 1941. - December 1942.);
- Colonel, June 1944. Major General Golovchiner B.M. (December 1942 - to the end of the war).
