= 22nd Rifle Division =

22nd Rifle Division can refer to:

- 22nd Guards Rifle Division
- 22nd Motor Rifle Division NKVD
- 40th Naval Infantry Brigade, formerly the 22nd Rifle Division
