= Ivan Khabarov =

Ivan Nikitich Khabarov (Russian: Иван Никитич Хабаров; 12 November 1888 in Ryazan Oblast – 1960) was a Soviet Army Commander during World War II.

At the beginning of the Winter War, Khabarov was the Commander of the 8th Army. He was removed from the post on 13 December 1939 due to failures, and Khabarov served in the Military logistics for the rest of the war. Khabarov was replaced by Grigory Shtern.

During the German-Soviet War, Khabarov was the leader of the Military School in the Ural Military District. In December 1943, he was appointed as the Vice Commander of the 2nd Shock Army. Khabarov resigned for health reasons on 26 May 1950.
