= 22nd Motor Rifle Division NKVD =

The 22nd Motor Rifle Division of the Internal Troops of the NKVD was a NKVD military unit in World War II.

== History ==
The division was formed on June 23, 1941, in Riga, in accordance with the mobilization plan, based on the 5th Motorized Rifle Regiment operational troops of the NKVD had 3904 personnel man. However, according to the plan, the division was to comprise the 1st, 3rd and 5th NKVD Infantry Regiment, but the 1st Regiment stationed in Kaunas, was embroiled in fighting and could not connect with the main forces of the division. 3rd Regiment stationed in Tallinn and was also unable to join the division.

The 5th Motorized Rifle Regiment on June 22, 1941, returning from Baranovichi did join the division, focused to 18-00 in the city. As part of the army on June 23, 1941, to January 5, 1942.

The division was filled out by the 83rd Railroad Regiment, the 155th Escort Battalion, and a Red Guards regiment formed from Riga workers' battalions.

At 7:40 on June 29, the Division's 83rd Regiment engaged enemy advance units, supported by five tanks, two of which were destroyed, and three dropped to the left bank. At 12:00 the advance part of the German 87th Infantry Division's 185th Infantry Regiment broke through Riga bridge. The forces of the division, together with the forces of the 10th Rifle Division, killed some of the enemy. At 2:00 am on June 30, it became known that the enemy had crossed the Daugava Krustpils and pressed in the direction of the Soviet Gulbene. In 3-00 of Krasnogvardeisky regiment received a report that the enemy crossed 15 kilometers south-east of Riga, crushed a militia battalion and advanced along the Moscow highway in the direction of Riga. The 155th Escort Battalion, defend the river crossing Yugla, subjected to massive air, which resulted in the convoy battalion suffered heavy losses and was dedicated to putting in order.

After 30 June 1941, had to operate as a part of 10th Rifle Corps, 8th Army but it had no organic artillery, engineer, or logistical support. 8.41 wiped out and disbanded 1.42.
