= 10th Rifle Corps =

- Russian: 10-й стрелковый корпус
- Active: July 1922 – June 1960
- Country: Soviet Union
- Branch: Red Army
- Engagements: Winter War; Eastern Front (World War II); Operation Barbarossa

The 10th Rifle Corps (Military Unit Number 16058 until June 1956) was an infantry corps of the Red Army, which later became the 10th Army Corps after the Second World War.

== Interwar period ==
The corps was formed by an order dated 12 July 1922 in the West Siberian Military District at Barnaul. Between May and November 1923, its headquarters was at Novonikolayevsk. In November, under the command of October Revolution and Russian Civil War hero Pavel Dybenko, the corps was transferred to Kozlov in the Moscow Military District. It was moved to Kursk in June 1924, and in 1937 to Voronezh. In September 1939, the corps fought in the Soviet invasion of Poland, occupying what is now western Belarus. From December 1939 to March 1940, the corps participated in the Winter War, fighting as part of the 7th Army in the western part of the Karelian Isthmus. After the Winter War ended, the 10th Rifle Corps was relocated back to Krasnoye Urochishche near Minsk in the Belorussian Special Military District. In June, the corps participated in the Soviet occupation of Lithuania, where it was initially headquartered at Šiauliai as part of the Baltic Special Military District from July, moving to Telšiai in August.

The First Formation was part of the operational army during World War II from June 22, 1941 to September 7, 1941.

== Cross-border fighting in Lithuania and Latvia (1941) ==
On June 22, 1941, when the German invasion of the Soviet Union, Operation Barbarossa, began, the corps and its headquarters was stationed in Varniai (Lithuania). It comprised the 10th, 48th and 90th Rifle Divisions, under Major General Ivan Nikolaev. On the right-flank of the corps, the 10th Rifle Division held positions on the border from Palanga to Shvekshny to the right of the 67th Rifle Division of the 27th Army. On its left, the 90th Rifle Division defended a line 30 kilometers wide, extending south to a junction with troops of the 125th Rifle Division of the 11th Rifle Corps. The 48th Rifle Division was still moving up and had not yet reached the border. The corps numbered 25,480 men, 453 guns and mortars and 12 light tanks.

Opposing the corps and larger Soviet forces were the German I Army Corps, XXVI Army Corps and XXXVIII Army Corps, and on the left wing – the tanks of the XXXXI Motorized Corps.

When the invasion began, German troops struck two major blows to the 10th's flanks: the first by the 291st Infantry Division, advancing from Memel to Kretinga and Palanga, and the second – by the XXXXI Motorized Corps on its junction with the 125th Rifle Division of the 11th Rifle Corps. The Soviet forces holding the attack's point of impact were quickly broken and part of the body in the early hours of the war was cut off from the north of the 67th Rifle Division, and the south of the 125th Rifle Division, and under the pressure of German troops began to retreat in the direction of Jelgava. On June 23, 1941 the gap between the 10th and 90th Rifle Division reached 20 kilometers. South of the 90th Division the enemy troops rushed to the Šiauliai. Since the band steps troops shell pressure slightly decreased, part of the body, or rather what was left of them, to June 26, 1941 a relatively orderly moved to line Mažeikiai – Kurtuvėnai and then on Riga. By that time, the 90th Rifle Division had virtually ceased to exist and in Riga the 22nd Motor Rifle Division NKVD was added to the corps. Within three days of the case were fighting for Riga, but July 1, 1941 finally left the city.

Its next major engagement was the Tallinn frontline defensive operation (1941).

The corps' headquarters was disbanded on September 14.

The corps was destroyed in the early fighting of Operation Barbarossa but reformed twice. It was reformed in October 1942, but disbanded in December, then reformed in February 1943, serving until the war ended in May 1945.

== Later formations and postwar ==
After the war, the corps arrived in the Urals Military District comprising the 91st, 279th, and 347th Rifle Divisions. Active in 1948 with three rifle brigades (12th, 14th and 28th), but in June 1957 became 10th Army Corps. In the early 1950s, it may have included the 2552nd Artillery Regiment.

In 1956, the corps moved from the Urals to the Baltic. In July 1957, as part of 11th Guards Army, the corps comprised 26th Guards Motor Rifle Division and 119th Motor Rifle Division, but was disbanded in (June) 1960. It had its headquarters at Vilnius.
