= Kurtuvėnai =

- Town
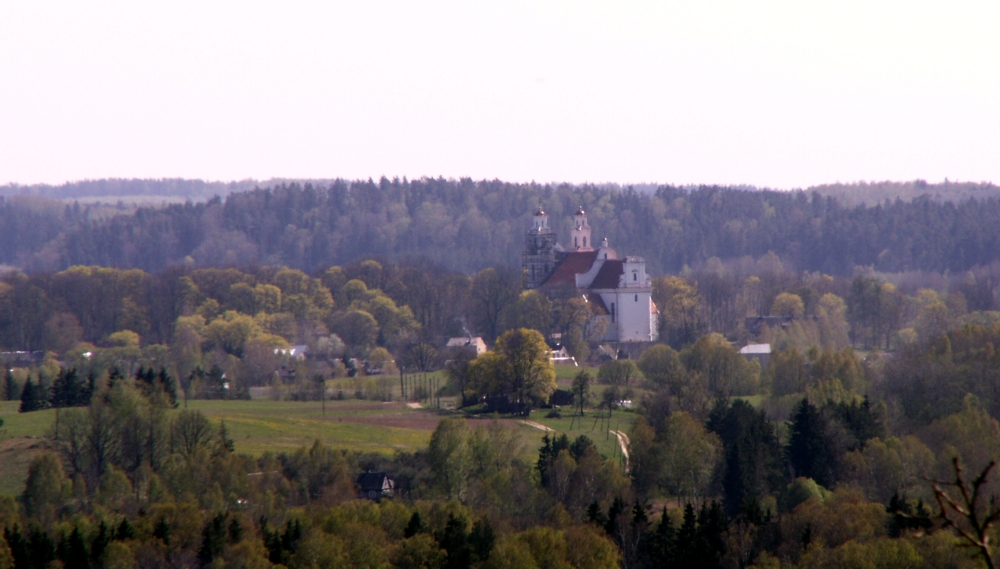

- Flag Coat of arms

- Location in Lithuania
- Coordinates: 55°49′50″N 23°3′0″E
- Country: Lithuania
- Ethnographic region: Samogitia
- County: Šiauliai County

Population (2011)
  - Total: 256
- Time zone: UTC+2 (EET)
  - Summer (DST): UTC+3 (EEST)

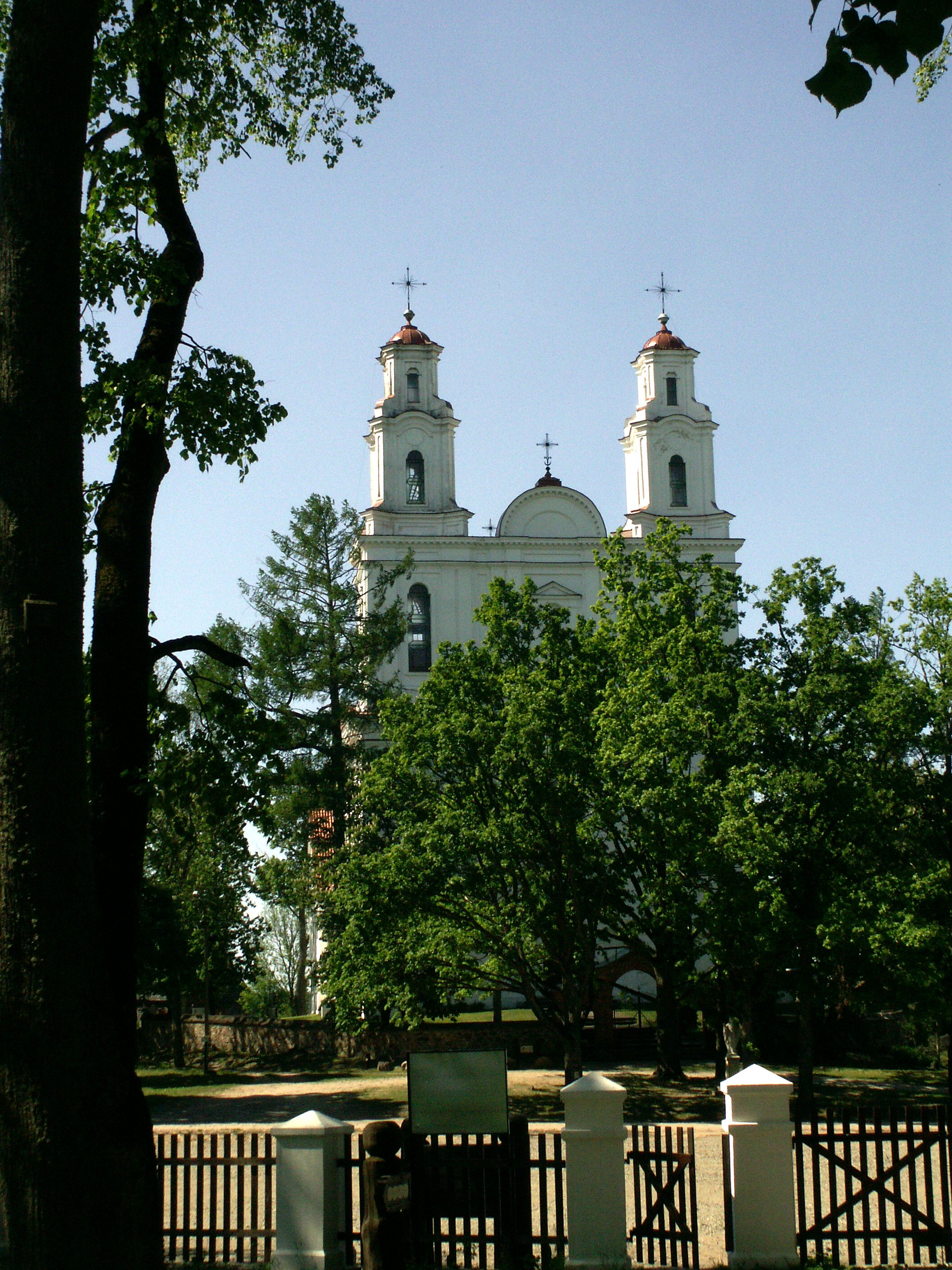
Kurtuvėnai church

Kurtuvėnai is a small town in Šiauliai County in northern-central Lithuania. In 2011 it had a population of 256.
