= III Corps (Finland, Winter War) =

WW2 unit of Finland

The III Corps (Finnish: III Armeijakunta) was a unit of the Finnish Army during the Winter War. The III Corps with the II Corps formed the Army of the Isthmus (Kannaksen armeija). For most of the war it defended the Mannerheim Line on the northern side of the River Vuoksi against Soviet attacks.

== Order of battle ==
- 8th Division (8.D)
- 10th Division (10.D) (later the 7th Division)

== Commanders ==
- Lieutenant General Erik Heinrichs (30.11.1939 - 19.02.1940),
- Major General Paavo Talvela (19.02.1940 - 13.03.1940).
