= Pagramantis =

- Town
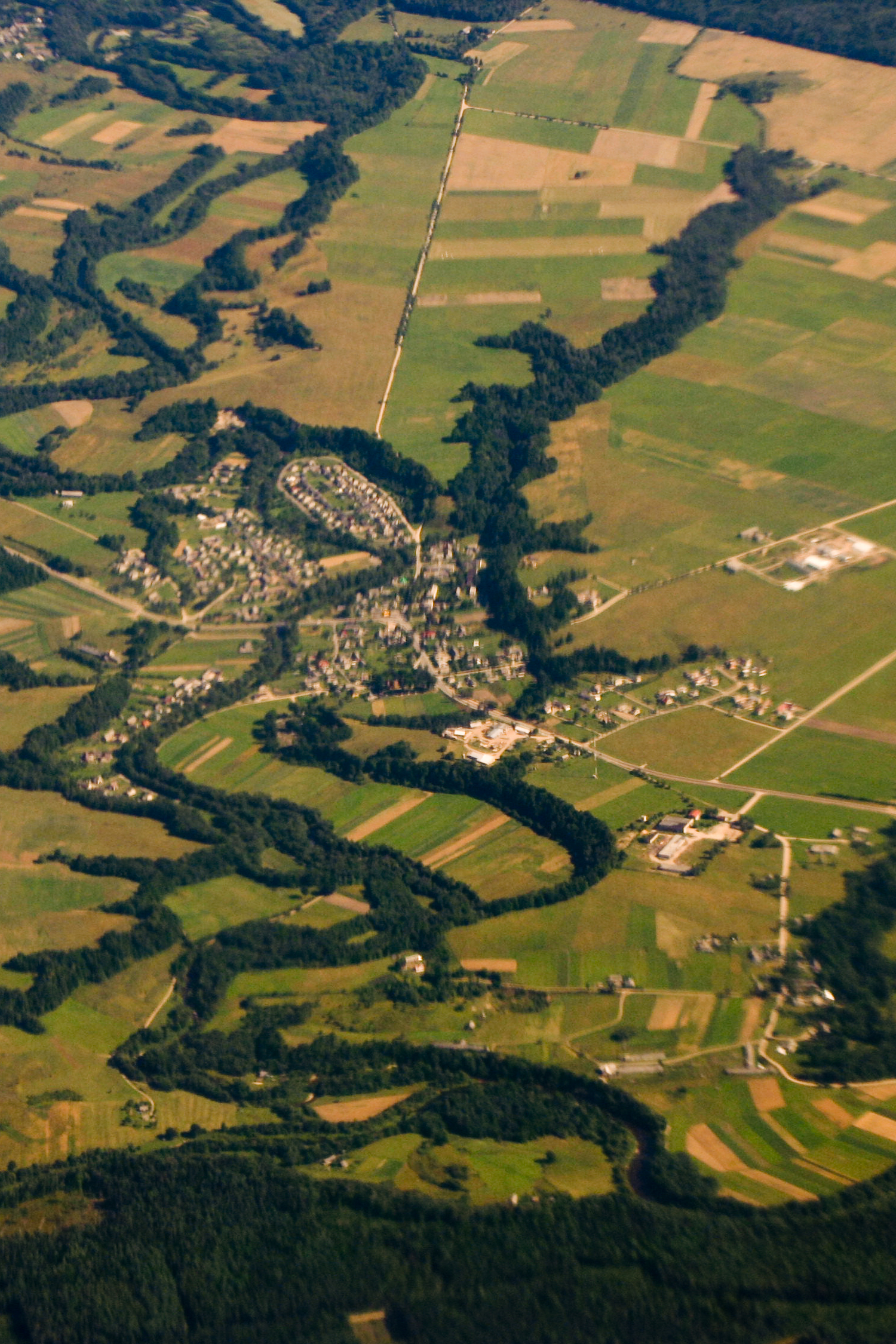

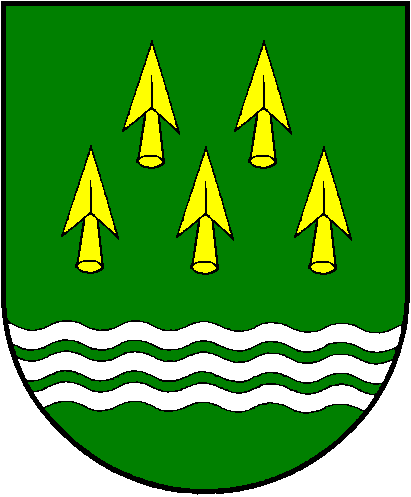
- Seal

- Location within Lithuania
- Coordinates: 55°21′50″N 22°13′50″E
- Country: Lithuania
- County: Taurage County

Population (2011)
  - Total: 434
- Time zone: UTC+2 (EET)
  - Summer (DST): UTC+3 (EEST)

Pagramantis is a town in Taurage County, Lithuania. According to the 2011 census, the town has a population of 434 people.

== Gallery ==
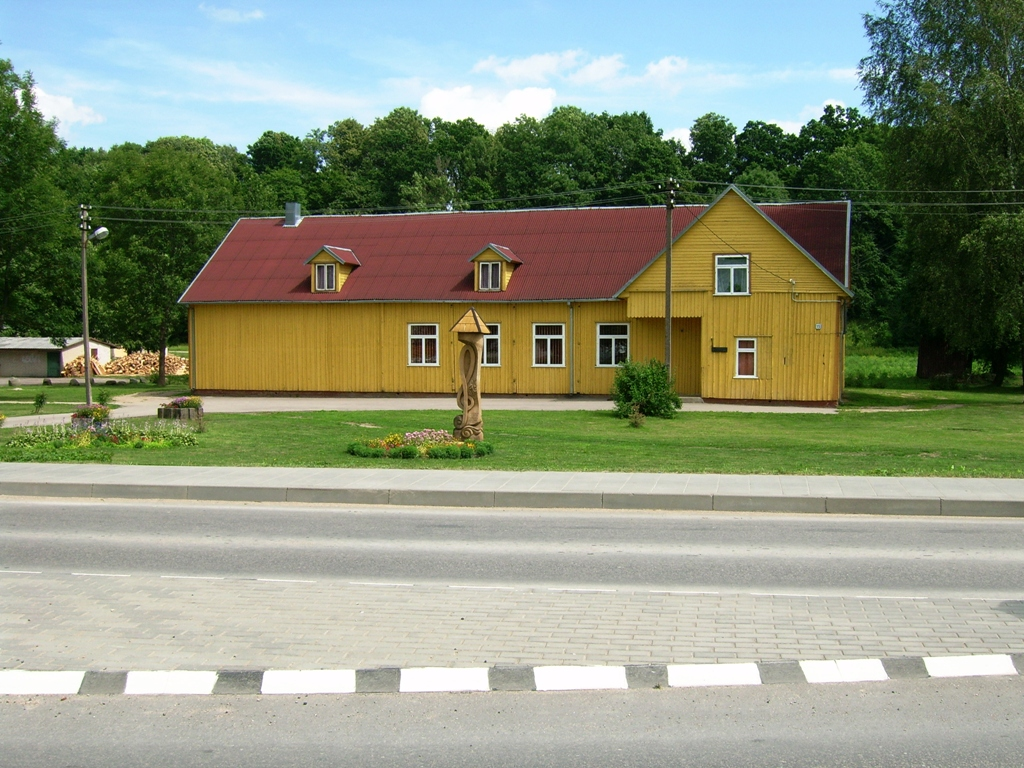
House of Culture

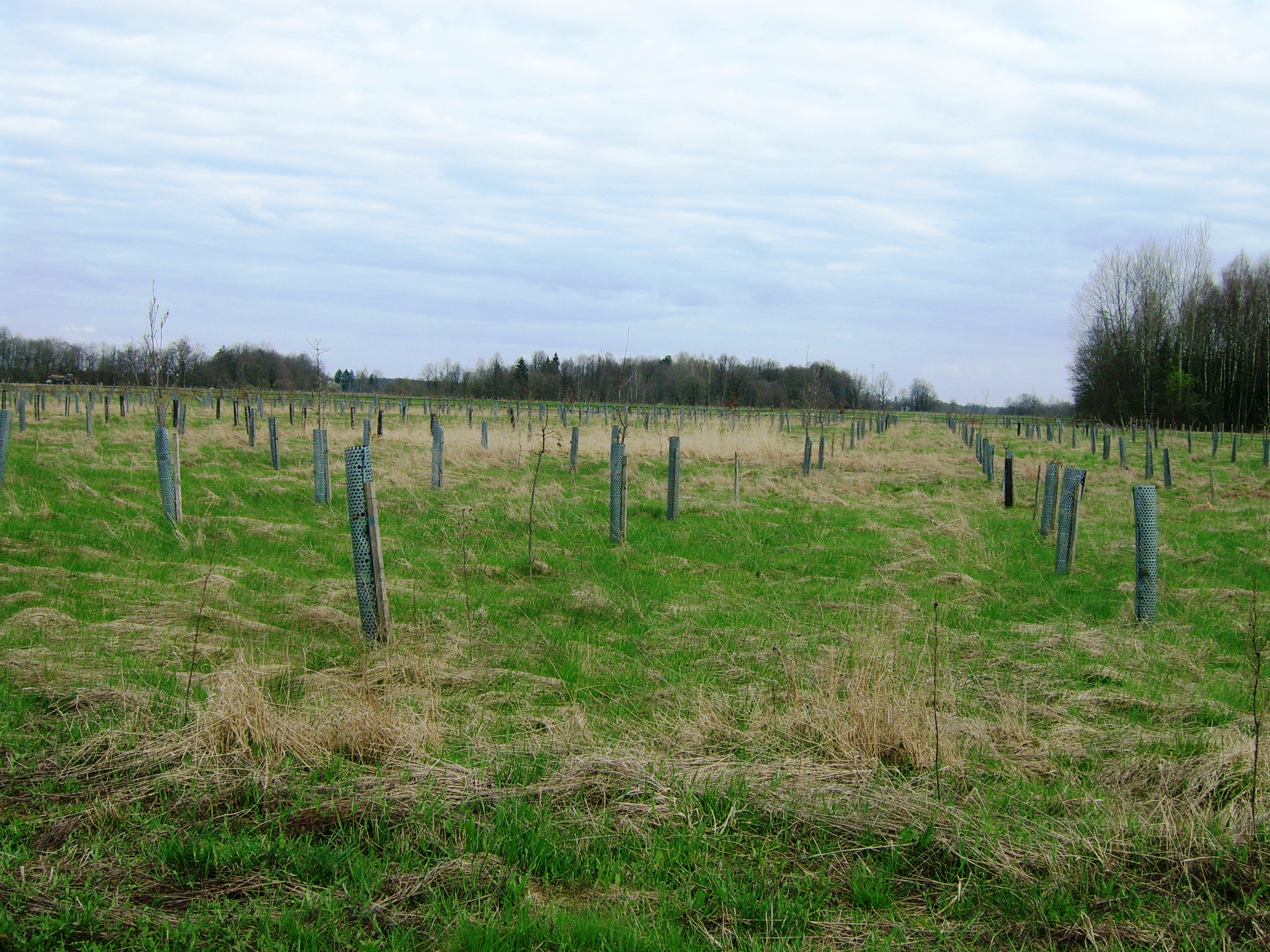
Lithuanian Millennium Park near Pagramantis

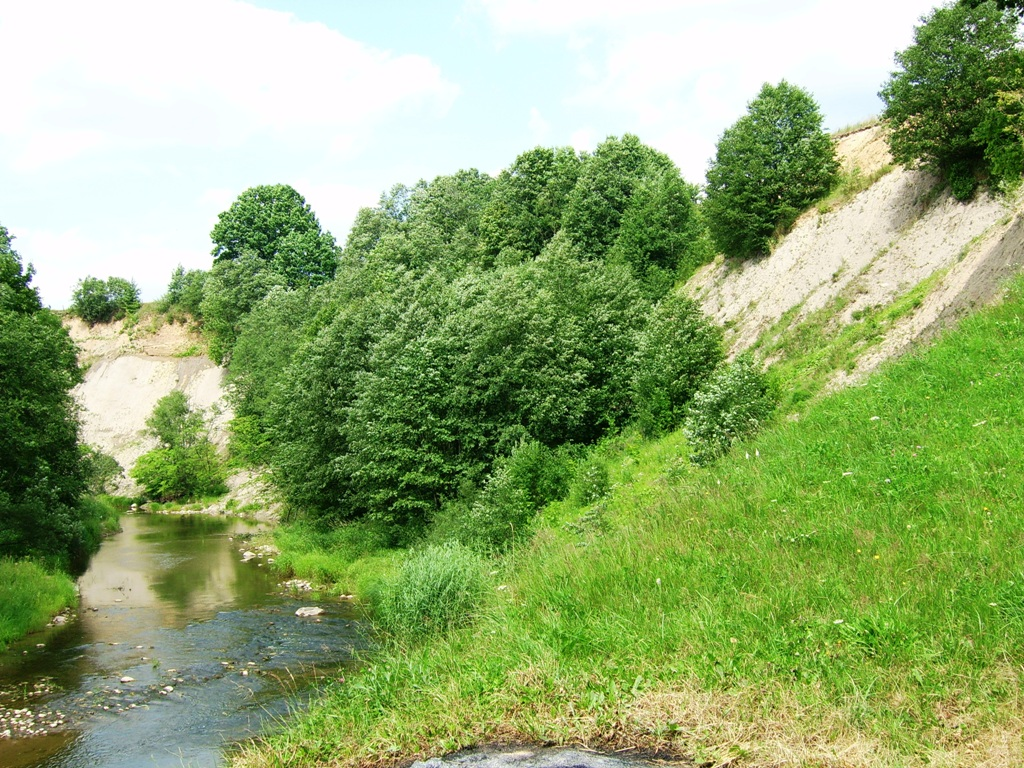
Pagramantis exposure

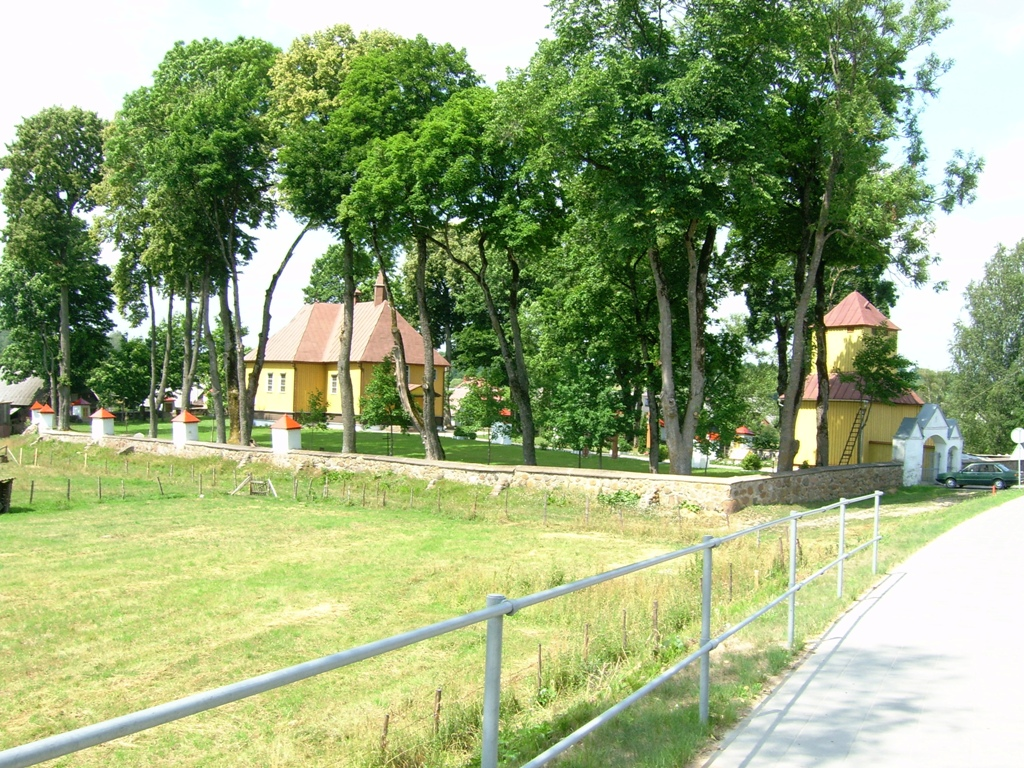
Church ensemble

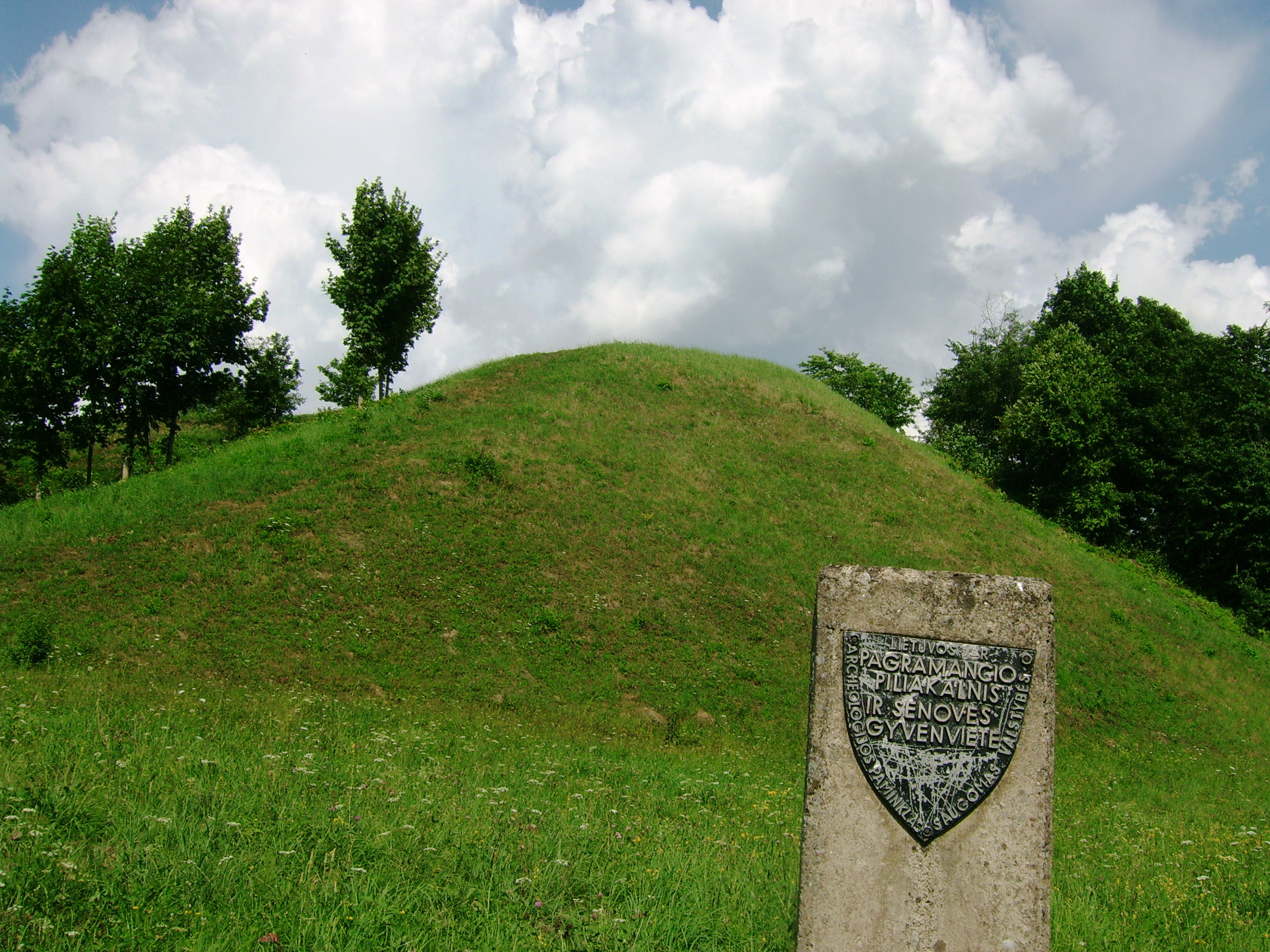
Pagramantis mound

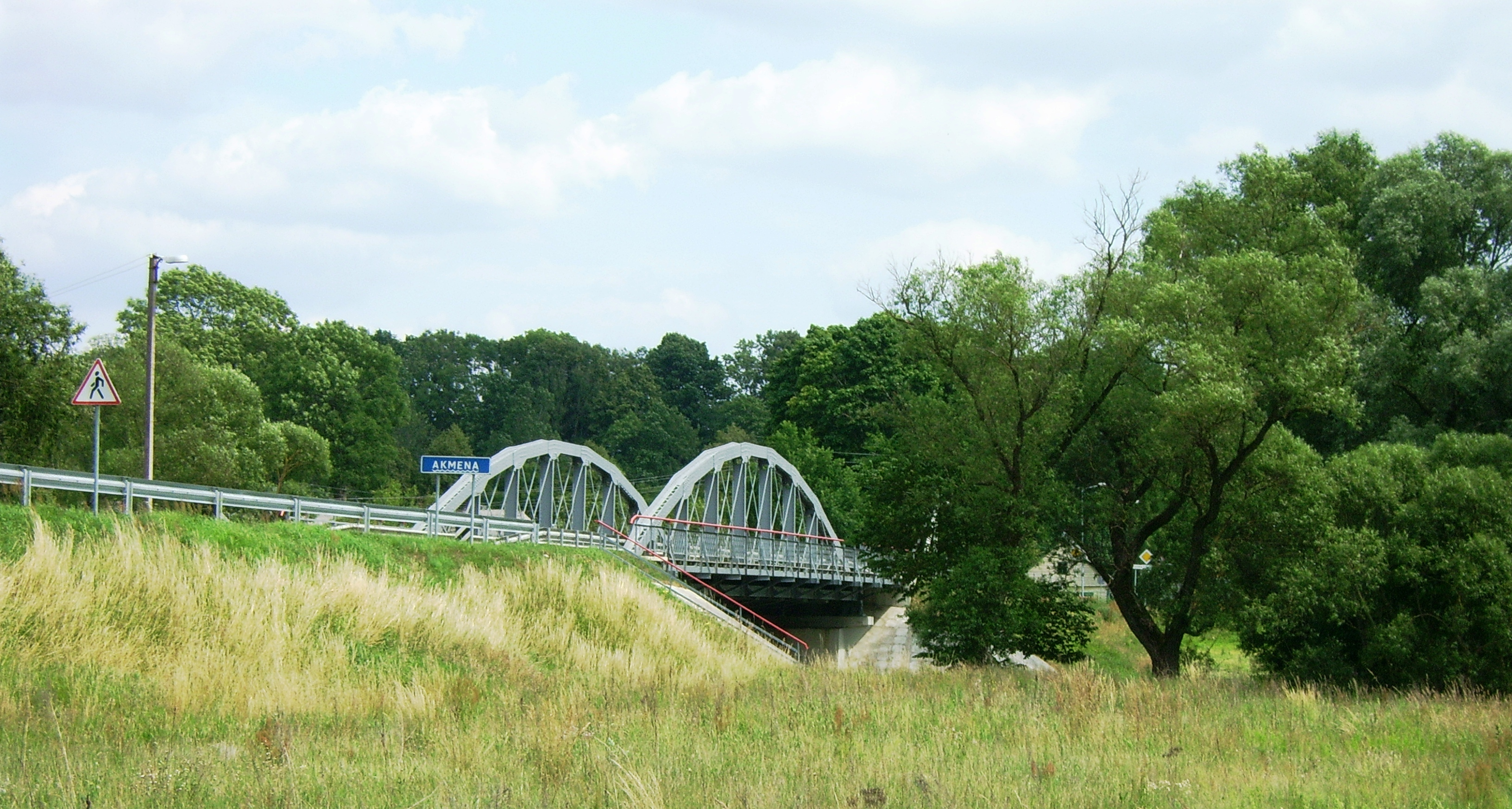
Bridge over Akmena

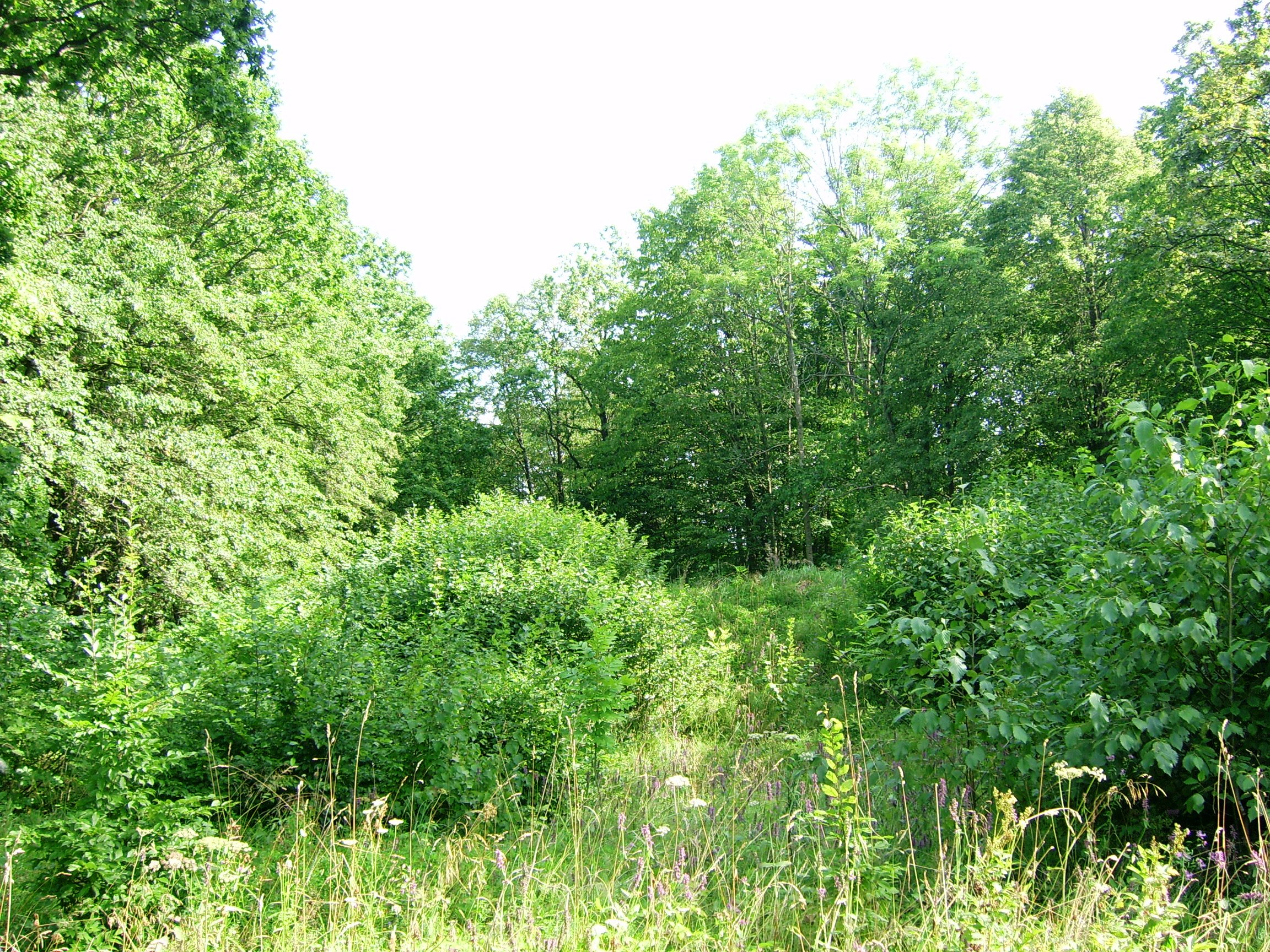
Naujininkai mound

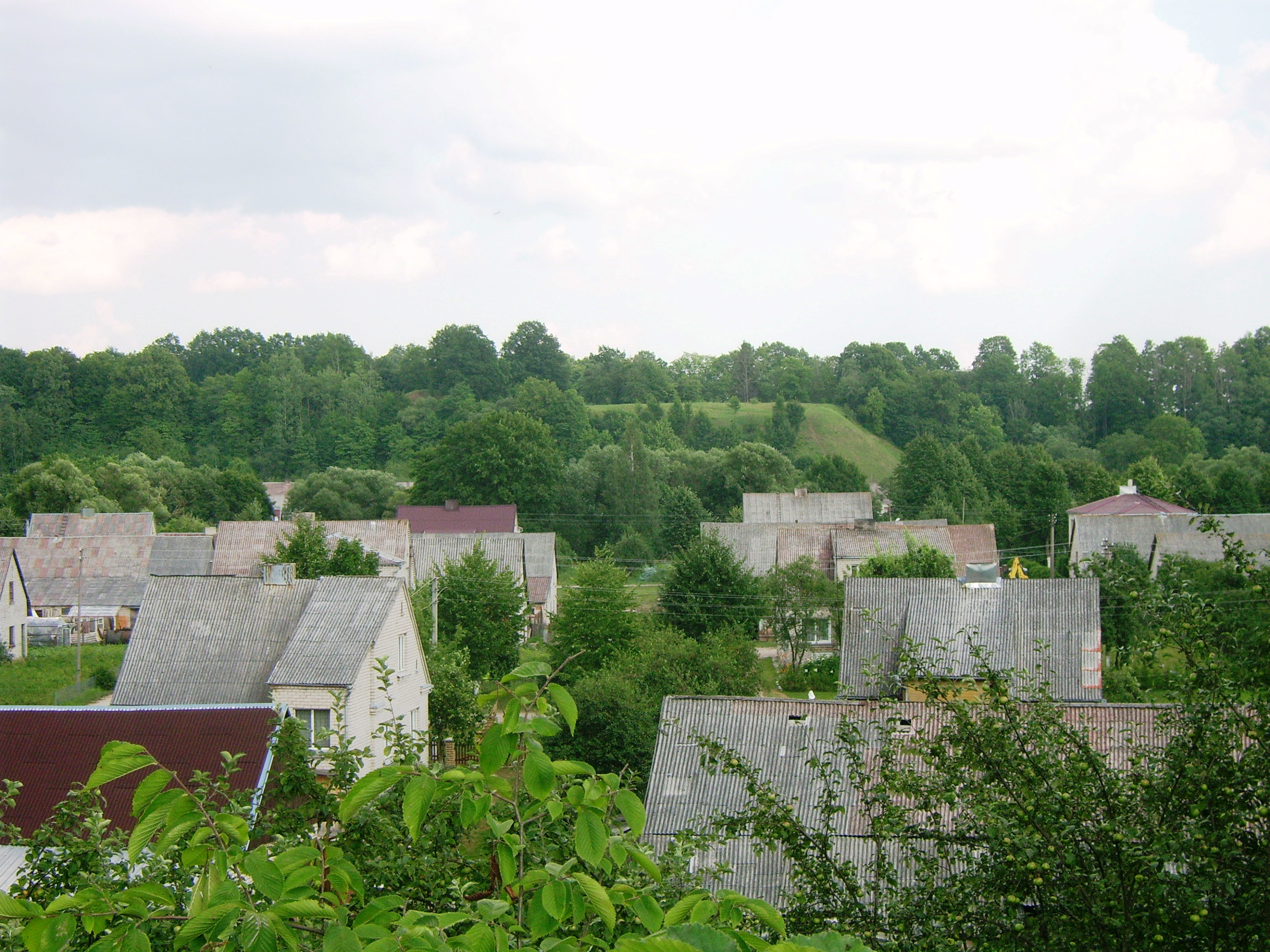
Town and mound
