= 10th Rifle Division (Soviet Union) =

- Active: 1922–1946
- Country: Soviet Union
- Branch: Red Army
- Type: Infantry
- Size: Division
- Engagements: World War II; Invasion of Poland; Baltic Operation; Siege of Leningrad; Vyborg–Petrozavodsk Offensive
- Decorations: Order of the Red Banner
- Battle honours: On behalf of the Northern Krai

Commanders
- Notable commanders: Mikhail Dukhanov

The 10th Rifle Division was a military formation of the Red Army. It existed by 1920, but was formally created on 20 June 1922, based on the 29th Infantry Brigade. It was then recreated at Vladimir in September 1939, and fought in the Second World War.

== Second World War ==
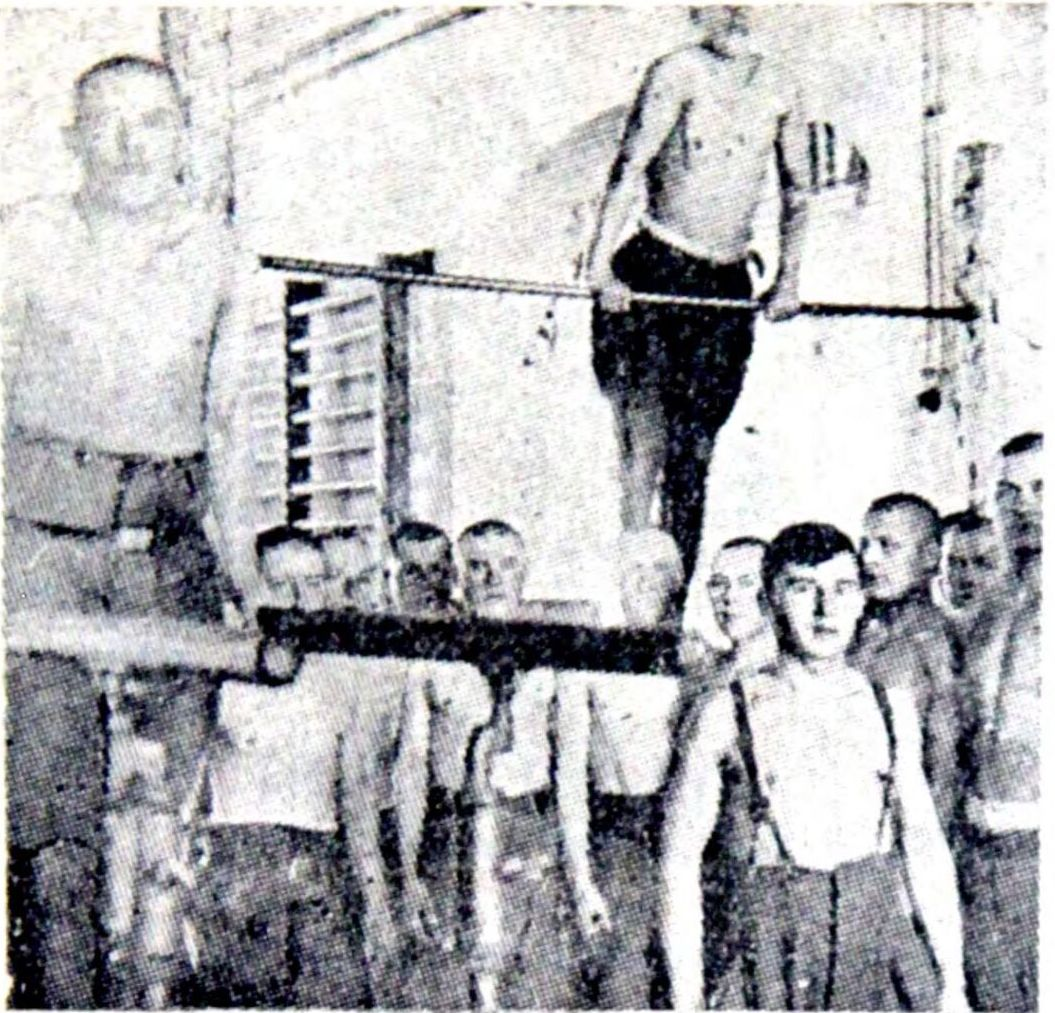
Soldiers of the 10th Artillery Regiment during physical training, 1928

Around 1939, the division was stationed in the Leningrad Military District, Western Special Military District, and the Baltic Special Military District. It participated in the Polish campaign in 1939, and in the accession of Lithuania to the USSR in June 1940.

It was part of the 10th Rifle Corps, 8th Army on 22 June 1941.

The division fought in northern Russia and the Baltic States. From April 1942 to December 1944 it was part of the 23rd Army, Leningrad Front, engaged in the siege of Leningrad. From June to August 1944 it took part in the Vyborg–Petrozavodsk Offensive as part of 115th Rifle Corps.

It was engaged in operations (in Russian terms, part of the 'operational army') during the Eastern Front campaign against Germany, from June 22, 1941, to May 9, 1945.

The division was disbanded in spring 1946 with the 6th Rifle Corps in the Don Military District.

=== Latvian battalion ===
In July 1940, the 1st and 2nd Latvian workers regiments (the last later changed to 76th Latvian Rifle Regiment) were formed in Estonia from Latvian workers guard battalions and other active duty soldiers, who at the beginning of German attack, fled from Latvia to Estonia. 1st Latvian Workers Regiment was formed on July 18, 1941. Their strength was about 900 men, and that was subordinate to 8th Army (Soviet Union), 10th Rifle Corps. In the beginning the regiment guarded the Corps rear lines and fought with Estonian and Latvian Destruction battalions, but later joined in battles against the Army Group North (until July 29). The regiment suffered heavy losses, and at the end of July transferred to Gogland Island and later to Kotlin Island (Kronstadt). From the left over regiment was later formed (3rd through September 7) Latvian Battalion (commander Žanis Grīva-Folkmanis), which was part of (Russian) 10th Rifle Division 62nd Regiment. The Latvian battalion had only 283 soldiers. By riflemen, Germans battalions destroyed them and the remaining part retreated to Leningrad, and Peterhof to be placed in 76th Latvian Riflemen Regiment.
