= Pyotr Georgyevich Novikov =

Red Army major general (1907–1944)

- Native name: Пётр Георгиевич Новиков
- Born: 18 December 1907; Luch, Kazan Governorate, Russian Empire
- Died: August 1944 (aged 36) Flossenbürg concentration camp, Nazi Germany
- Allegiance: Soviet Union
- Branch: Red Army
- Service years: 1923–1942
- Rank: Major General
- Commands: 2nd Cavalry Division 2nd Rifle Division; 109th Rifle Division Sevastopol Defense Region
- Conflicts: Spanish Civil War; World War II; Winter War; Southern Front; Siege of Odessa; Siege of Sevastopol (POW)
- Awards: Order of the Red Banner

Pyotr Georgyevich Novikov (Russian: Пётр Георгиевич Новиков; 18 December 1907 – August 1944) was a Red Army major general. Novikov fought in the Spanish Civil War as a battalion commander. After returning to the Soviet Union he fought in the Winter War. After the end of the Winter War Novikov became commander of the 2nd Cavalry Division. He led the division in battles on the Southern Front. The division became the 109th Rifle Division and fought in the Siege of Sevastopol. After the evacuation of Filipp Oktyabrsky and Ivan Yefimovich Petrov, Novikov became commander of the Sevastopol defense. Novikov attempted to evacuate the city on a patrol boat and was intercepted and captured by German forces. He was sent to concentration camps in Germany and died at Flossenbürg concentration camp in August 1944.

== Early life and interwar military service ==
Novikov was born on 18 December 1907 in the village of Luch in Kazan Governorate to a peasant family. Novikov graduated from the rural school and then higher primary school. In 1923 he entered the Red Army Kazan Infantry School. After graduating from the school, he became a Red Army officer. Novikov became a Communist Party of the Soviet Union member in 1928. Between May 1937 and July 1938 Novikov fought in the Spanish Civil War as a battalion commander. On 22 October 1937 he was awarded the Order of the Red Banner for his actions. Novikov received the Medal "For Courage" on 14 November 1938. Returning to the Soviet Union, Novikov became commander of the 95th Rifle Division's 241st Rifle Regiment, which he led until September 1939. He fought in the Winter War. In May 1940, he was appointed commander of the 2nd Cavalry Division.

== World War II ==
After Operation Barbarossa, the German invasion of the Soviet Union, Novikov fought in battles on the Southern Front, leading the 2nd Cavalry Division. Novikov fought in the Siege of Odessa. After being evacuated from Odessa to the Crimea, he was promoted to Major general on 12 October 1941. On 3 November he was appointed commandant of Yalta. On 23 November he was appointed commander of the 2nd Rifle Division, the dismounted 2nd Cavalry Division. He fought in the Siege of Sevastopol. Novikov's division defended the 1st Sector of Sevastopol's defense on the Balaklava axis from 9 November 1941. Novikov became the sector commander.

In January 1942 the division became the 109th Rifle Division. On 1 June the division withdrew back to Cape Kherson after the final German offensive, holding positions between Streletskaya Bay and Firsovo Farm. After the evacuation of Filipp Oktyabrsky and Ivan Yefimovich Petrov Novikov was appointed commander of the Sevastopol Defense Region by Petrov. On 2 July he left Sevastopol with other officers in subchaser SKA-112 and was intercepted by S-boats off Yalta. The subchaser was sunk after a running battle with the German boats and Novikov was captured. He was transferred to the Hammelburg camp. In December 1942, Novikov was transferred to the Flossenbürg concentration camp. He was killed by camp guards in August 1944. According to postwar testimony by Lieutenant Colonel Kalanchuk, Novikov died when he was hit with a stool by a camp guard near the furnace of Flossenbürg's 5th Block. Generals Ivan Muzychenko and Ivan Skugarev testified that Novikov died of overwork and exhaustion.
