= Dmitry Lukyanov (general) =

Soviet Army major general

Dmitry Akimovich Lukyanov
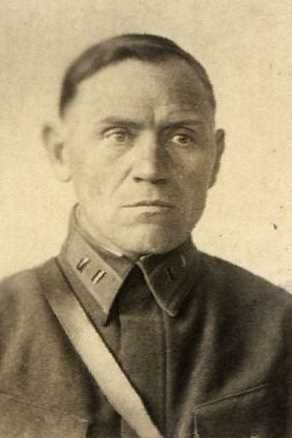
- Lukyanov, c. 1940, as a Major
- Born: 15 February 1900; Yeskovo, Likhvinsky Uyezd, Kaluga Governorate, Russian Empire
- Died: 7 October 1985 (aged 85) Zhdanov, Ukrainian SSR, Soviet Union
- Allegiance: Soviet Union
- Branch: Red Army
- Service years: 1918–1953
- Rank: Major general
- Commands: 191st Rifle Division; 2nd Rifle Division; 128th Rifle Division; 189th Rifle Division; 85th Rifle Division; 48th Rifle Division; 67th Rifle Division
- Conflicts: Russian Civil War; Polish–Soviet War; World War II; Winter War; Eastern Front
- Awards: Order of Lenin

Dmitry Akimovich Lukyanov (Russian: Дмитрий Акимович Лукьянов; 15 February 1900 – 7 October 1985) was a Soviet Army major general who held division command during World War II.

A veteran of the Russian Civil War, Lukyanov rose to command a regiment during the Winter War. He served as a division commander for most of World War II, beginning the war as commander of the 191st Rifle Division in the Siege of Leningrad. After recovering from a serious wound suffered in late 1941, Lukyanov commanded the 2nd Rifle Division from 1942 to early 1944. Relieved of command during the Leningrad–Novgorod offensive, Lukyanov continued as a division commander for most of the rest of the war in the Baltics. After commanding four different divisions in 1944 and 1945 and service as a corps deputy commander, Lukyanov continued in similar positions until he left active service in the early 1950s.

== Early life and Russian Civil War ==
Dmitry Akimovich Lukyanov was born on 15 February 1900 in the village of Yeskovo, Likhvinsky Uyezd, Kaluga Governorate. He worked as an unskilled laborer in the Levinson textile shop in the Sokolniki District of Moscow, and joined the Moscow-Saratov Regiment of the Red Army on 5 April 1918 during the Russian Civil War. As a Red Army man in the regiment, Lukyanov fought on the Eastern Front against the White Orenburg Cossacks, and from November on the Southern Front against the Armed Forces of South Russia. In battles near Repna on 11 April 1919 Lukyanov was wounded and was treated at the 40th Military Hospital in Tula for a month.

Returning to his regiment. Lukyanov was captured by the Whites on 25 July in the battle near Tornovka, Balashovsky Uyezd, and sent to a prisoner of war camp in Azov. From there, Lukyanov was sent to the Netsvetay Paramonov mine for labor as a mine horse driver. In December he was freed by elements of the 33rd Kuban Rifle Division. After questioning, Lukyanov was enrolled as a cadet in the training detachment of the division's 289th Rifle Regiment. Graduating from the training detachment, Lukyanov became a machine gun platoon commander in May 1920 and took part in the Polish–Soviet War. After the defeat of the division in the Battle of Warsaw Lukyanov retreated with the division into East Prussia, where the Soviet troops were interned.

== Interwar period ==
Lukyanov was interned in the Hameln and Minden camps until June 1921, when he returned to Soviet Russia. Lukyanov was sent to the 73rd Novgorod Infantry Courses as a cadet, and in May 1922 transferred to the Petrograd Infantry School. After graduating from the school in August 1925, Lukyanov took command of a platoon of the 79th Rifle Regiment of the 27th Rifle Division of the Western Military District at Lepel. From September 1927 to August 1929 he completed the Engels Leningrad Political Courses. After graduating from the courses he served as a company political instructor, and from November 1930 commanded a company of the Kronstadt Fortress Rifle Regiment of the Leningrad Military District. In March 1936, Lukyanov was transferred to the 11th Rifle Division to serve as assistant chief of staff of its 32nd Rifle Regiment, and in October became a battalion commander in its 33rd Rifle Regiment. Appointed commander of the 43rd Rifle Division's 65th Rifle Regiment on 13 January 1938, Lukyanov transferred to command the division's 147th Rifle Regiment in May. Completing the Vystrel course in 1939, Lukyanov returned to command the 147th Regiment. He led the regiment in the Winter War, receiving the Order of the Red Banner on 1 April 1940 for his performance. Then-Colonel Lukyanov became deputy commander of the 43rd in December 1940, and in March 1941 took command of the 191st Rifle Division.

== World War II ==
After the beginning of Operation Barbarossa, the division was assigned to the Northern Front and on the night of 24–25 June sent to the port of Kunda on the Gulf of Finland to eliminate a landing there. The second echelon defended on the line from Lake Chudskoye to Narva, preparing the way for the retreat of the 8th Army. From 2 to 31 July the division was assigned to the Luga Operational Group of the Northern Front. On 15 July the division entered battle in the area of Losevaya Gora when German mechanized units broke through and held the line for three days. On 20 July its units went on the offensive, tasked with preventing the German advance from reaching Leningrad. During these battles the division managed to halt the German advance. The division went on the defensive on 23 July on the approaches to Narva and Kingisepp. From 31 July to 22 August the division was assigned to the Kingisepp defense sector of the Northern Front and repulsed repeated German attacks. Subsequently, its units, assigned to the 8th Army of the Leningrad Front, fought sustained defensive battles in the regions of Khabino and Ropsha, and near the cities of Petergof and Oranienbaum. Lukyanov was wounded during the September fighting. During the second half of October the division, assigned to the 54th Army, covered the Soviet crossing of the Neva. From 25 to 26 October the 191st was airlifted to the region of Sitomlya and as part of the 4th Separate Army took part in the Tikhvin defensive operation. During the operation, Lukyanov was seriously wounded and evacuated to the rear on 28 November.

Lukyanov was treated in a hospital in Chelyabinsk until 5 January 1942, and on his recovery was appointed commander of the 2nd Rifle Division, forming in the Arkhangelsk Military District. In early April, the division arrived to the Volkhov Front and was assigned to the front reserve. The 2nd Division was assigned to the 59th Army of the Leningrad Front's Volkhov Group of Forces on 25 April, defending the western bank of the Volkhov, securing the breakout of the 2nd Shock Army from encirclement. The division held defenses on the western bank of the Volkhov in the Zvanka region from 9 July. Lukyanov was promoted to major general on 18 May 1943. The division was reassigned to the 4th Army on 26 September 1943. On 12 November the 2nd Division returned to the 59th Army and took defenses on the line of the railroad through Novgorod, Chudovo, and Kolyashka. During the Novgorod–Luga offensive, part of the wider Leningrad–Novgorod strategic offensive, the 2nd Division took the strongly fortified center of resistance of Osiya on 19 January 1944, and continuing the offensive, reached the line of the Luga river, liberating more than 100 settlements. However, Lukyanov was relieved of command of the division by the 59th Army military council on 12 February for "absence of organization and loss of control in battle."

Lukyanov was given another chance at division command, taking command of the 128th Rifle Division of the 42nd Army on 3 March. The division was transferred together with the army from the Leningrad Front to the 3rd Baltic Front on 24 April. Lukyanov was awarded the Order of the Red Banner on 25 June for distinguishing himself in battle and his training of the 128th Division. The citation read:

Major General D. A. Lukyanov has been on the front of the Patriotic War from its first days, and a division commander since March 1941. He gained broad combat experience while commanding units. While he commanded the 191st Rifle Division of the Leningrad Front until November 1941, the division repeatedly had combat successes in wiping out German troops on the approaches to Leningrad. The 2nd Rifle Division, which Comrade Lukyanov commanded, in a series of operations conducted on the Volkhov Front, showed steadfastness and cohesion and had significant tactical successes in these operations. Being commander of the 191st Rifle Division, which later became a Red Banner unit, he was wounded in intense fighting in September 1941 and seriously wounded in November 1941. Under the command of Major General Comrade Lukyanov, the 128th Rifle Division gained unit cohesion. He taught the units and staff using the examples of his combat experience and personal knowledge. He devotes much attention to the supply of the personnel of the division. The division is ready for battle. Comrade Lukyanov fully merits the award of the Order of the Red Banner.

During the Pskov–Ostrov offensive, the division liberated Pskov on 23 July. The division was transferred to the 67th Army on 29 July and took part in the Tartu offensive. During the offensive, Lukyanov was promoted to serve as deputy commander of the 122nd Rifle Corps on 19 August. Between 25 and 28 August he temporarily commanded the 189th Rifle Division, then returned to his position as deputy corps commander. He took part in the Baltic offensive in this position. For his performance in the August and September battles Lukyanov was awarded the Order of the Patriotic War 1st class on 17 December 1944. The citation read:

Major General Lukyanov has served as deputy commander of the 122nd Rifle Corps since 23 August 1944. From the first day of his arrival to the corps he took an active part in the leadership of troops, spending a large part of his time in the units in the decisive sectors, striving to carry out orders with boldness and decisiveness. On 23 and 24 August, during the battles for the city of Elva, Estonian SSR, Major General Lukyanov, being in the 189th Rifle Division, took an active and decisive part in the organization of the repulse of enemy counterattacks of the tank group of the "great" Strachwitz. After the death of division commander Major General Potapov, he took command of the division, skillfully led the units, took the city of Elva and ensured the success of the pursuit of the enemy. During his time as commander of the 189th Rifle Division he systematically fulfilled the assigned objectives: the division was one of the first to reach the line of the Väike Emajõgi river.

During the battles from 14 September 1944 to 1 October 1944 Major General Lukyanov was with the units the entire time, rendering practical assistance in the carrying out of assigned objectives. On 17 and 18 September 1944, the 189th Rifle Division, forcing a crossing of the Okhneiygi river line, met strong and organized enemy resistance. Major General Lukyanov, going to the units, correctly organized combined-arms cooperation and with insignificant losses for our side took the strong enemy fortified point of Rulle, ensuring the success of the crossing of the river and destruction of the enemy on its west bank.

On 22 September 1944 the 184th Rifle Regiment of the 56th Rifle Division, tasked with cutting highway communications of the enemy between Piksare and Shalderi from the region of the Omuli railroad station, encountered strong enemy resistance in a defile between lakes while carrying out the objective. Going to the regiment, Major General Lukyanov boldly organized the maneuvers of the units, and, flanking the enemy from the right, the regiment reached the enemy rear, inflicting significant losses on the enemy, capturing up to fifteen prisoners and fulfilling the objective. Major General Lukyanov is a bold, decisive and dynamic commander. For distinguishing himself in the carrying out of combat objectives he is deserving of the state award Order of the Patriotic War, 1st class.

Lukyanov commanded the 85th Rifle Division from 8 December. Until 13 February 1945 its units, concentrated in the region of Kraukli, Raknis, and Megori, conducted combat training and guarded state enterprises in Riga. Afterwards, the 85th, assigned to the 2nd Baltic Front, fought in offensive and defensive battles in the region of Riga at Baloži, Kreyli and Slugi. Lukyanov was transferred to command the 48th Rifle Division of the 130th Rifle Corps of the 22nd Army on 12 March. In the second half of April the division handed over its defense sector north of Auce and was relocated to Romania, where it remained for final weeks of the war.

== Postwar ==
Postwar, Lukyanov continued to command the division, which transferred to the Odessa Military District in August 1945. After completing the Higher Academic Courses at the Voroshilov Higher Military Academy between March 1946 and March 1947, he was placed at the disposal of the Cadre Directorate of the Ground Forces. In June, Lukyanov was appointed deputy commander of the 131st Rifle Corps of the White Sea Military District at Kem. He was transferred to hold the same position with the 31st Rifle Corps at Murmansk in March 1951, and a month later appointed commander of the 67th Rifle Division, which became part of the Northern Military District in July 1951. The 31st Rifle Corps headquarters was disbanded in March 1952 and the field headquarters of the 6th Army created from it. The 67th was assigned to the 6th Army. Lukyanov was transferred to the reserve on 30 December 1953, and died on 7 October 1985 in Zhdanov in the Ukrainian Soviet Socialist Republic.

== Awards ==
Lukyanov was a recipient of the following decorations:

- Order of Lenin
- Order of the Red Banner (4)
- Order of the Patriotic War, 1st class (2)
- Medals
