= 21st Rifle Division =

21st Rifle Division can refer to:

- 21st Guards Motor Rifle Division (Russia)
- 21st Guards Motor Rifle Division (Soviet Union)
- 21st Guards Rifle Division, Soviet Union
- 21st Motor Rifle Division, Soviet Union
- 21st Motor Rifle Division NKVD, Soviet Union
- 21st Rifle Division (Soviet Union)

== See also ==
- 21st Division (disambiguation)
