= Dmitry Lukyanov =

Dmitry Lukyanov may refer to:

- Dmitry Lukyanov (cyclist)
- Dmitry Lukyanov (general)
