= 109th Rifle Division =

109th Rifle Division (April 15, 1939 – January 1940) 109th Rifle Division (January 29, 1942 – July 30, 1942) 109th Rifle Division (August 6, 1942 – 1946)
- Active: 1939-40, 1942–46
- Country: Soviet Union
- Branch: Red Army
- Type: Infantry
- Size: Division
- Engagements: Siege of Sevastopol; Siege of Leningrad; Leningrad–Novgorod Offensive; Vyborg–Petrozavodsk Offensive; Baltic Offensive
- Decorations: Order of the Red Banner (3rd formation)
- Battle honours: Leningrad (3rd formation)

Commanders
- Notable commanders: Col. Nikolai Pavlovich Krasnoretzkiy; Maj. Gen. Pyotr Georgyevich Novikov; Maj. Gen. Nikolai Andreevich Trushkin

The 109th Rifle Division was a Red Army infantry division that was formed three times, briefly in 1939, during 1942, and again from 1942 to 1946. The first formation of the division was converted to a mechanized division after about nine months. Its second formation served for six months in 1942 in the defense of the fortress of Sevastopol, in the southern sector of the siege lines. After being destroyed there in July, a third division was formed by re-designating an existing rifle division near Leningrad in August, and it successfully held its positions for nearly a year and a half, in spite of shortages of food and supplies due to the German/Finnish siege. The 109th then participated in the Leningrad–Novgorod Offensive that drove the Germans and Finns away from the city and lifted the siege in early 1944, helped drive Finland out of the war in the Vyborg–Petrozavodsk Offensive, and then joined the offensive along the Baltic coast towards Germany. This third formation compiled an admirable record of service, but was disbanded in 1946.

== 1st Formation ==
The first 109th Rifle Division began forming at Tatarsk in the Novosibirsk Oblast on April 15, 1939, based on a cadre provided by the 79th Rifle Regiment of the 73rd Rifle Division. Col. Nikolai Pavlovich Krasnoretzkiy was appointed to command on June 1, and he would hold that post through this formation's existence. In January 1940, the division moved to Kharanor to be reorganized as the 109th Motorized Division.

== 2nd Formation ==
The division was reformed by the re-designation of the third formation of the 2nd Rifle Division in January 1942 at Sevastopol. It consisted of, in part:

- 381st Rifle Regiment - re-designated from the 1330th Rifle Regiment
- 456th Rifle Regiment - formed from a mixed NKVD Regiment
- 602nd Rifle Regiment - re-designated from the 383rd Rifle Regiment
- 404th Artillery Regiment - re-designated from the 51st Artillery Regiment
- 256th Antitank Battalion
- 234th Antiaircraft Battery
- 192nd Mortar Battalion
- 173rd Reconnaissance Company
- 229th Sapper Battalion
- 279th Signal Battalion
- 281st Medical/Sanitation Battalion
- 44th Chemical Defense (Anti-gas) Platoon
- 190th Motor Transport Company
- 173rd Field Bakery (later 191st)
- 992nd Divisional Veterinary Hospital
- 1729th Field Postal Station
- 1421st Field Office of the State Bank

It was part of the Separate Coastal Army, where it served for the duration of its existence. In the final defense of the Sevastopol Fortress, the 109th fought as part of the "First Sector", and its divisional commander, Maj. Gen. Pyotr Georgyevich Novikov, also served as the Sector commander. The division was tasked with the defense of the high ground that blocked German entry into Balaclava; in fact, the 456th Rifle Regiment held the same area where the British 93rd Highland Regiment made its famous "Thin Red Line" stand in October 1854.

In spite of directions from above, the commander of German XXX Army Corps began an attack on the 109th on June 7, 1942, as part of the overall final offensive against Sevastopol. 456th Rifle Regiment inflicted heavy casualties, in part through antiaircraft and sniper fire, while the 381st Regiment, initially taken by surprise, also threw back the enemy with heavy losses. After four more days of piecemeal attacks, the German corps had suffered over 1,000 casualties for no gains. A larger-scale offensive, with armor support, began on June 11, and captured Ruin Hill from the 602nd Regiment. Despite this the division continued to resist strongly; unfortunately the adjoining 388th Rifle Division defending the village of Kamary was not faring so well. Novikov decided to attempt to relieve one regiment of that division in place on the night of June 12/13, but this move was detected by the Germans who successfully launched an attack to disrupt it. Late in the afternoon of the 13th, with Soviet defenses in the center of the sector in disorder, a further German assault overwhelmed and routed the 602nd. While the rest of the division continued to hold firm, Novikov had no option but to pull his forces back 1,000 - 1,500 metres on June 16 roughly along the line of the Sapun Heights.

A lull set in over the next few days, but on the night of June 28/29 German Eleventh Army launched its final assault all along the line. By the end of this disastrous day for the Soviet defenders the 109th was still relatively intact, but concentrated around Balaclava. Realizing he was about to be cut off, Novikov ordered his division to force-march toward Coastal Battery 35 on the Chersonese Peninsula, where he formed a defensive perimeter with about 50,000 men, mostly stragglers. He was handed command of the Separate Coastal Army on the 30th as the Soviet leadership fled; when he tried to follow in a sub-chaser on July 2 the ship was intercepted and sunk, and Novikov was captured. 456th Rifle Regiment made a last stand around Coastal Battery 18, but by the evening of July 4 all the remaining forces on the peninsula were destroyed or captured. The 109th Rifle Division was officially stricken from the Soviet order of battle on July 30.

== 3rd Formation ==
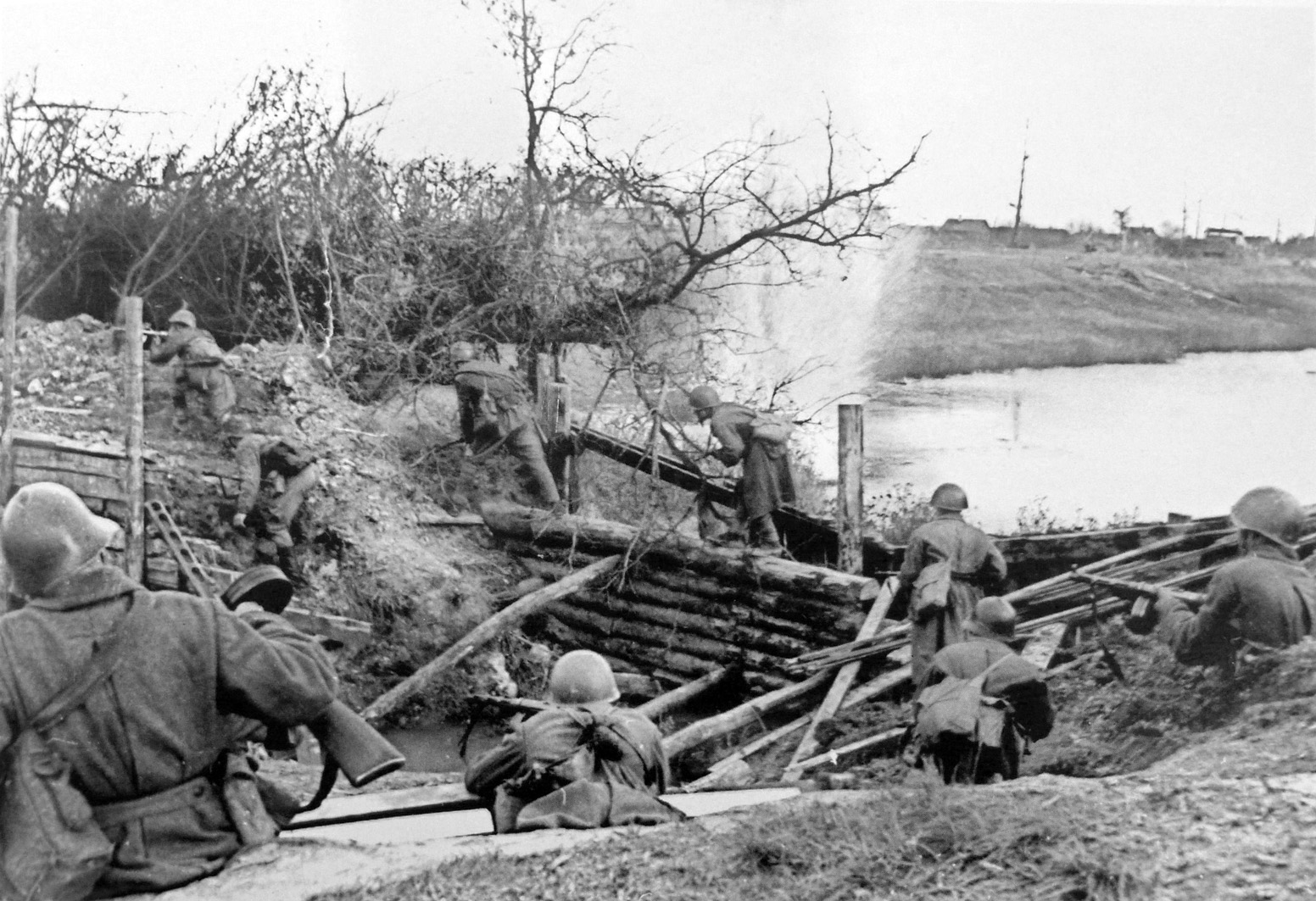
Submachine gunners from Lieutenant Leonid Toistev's unit of the 381st Rifle Regiment forcing a body of water under German fire, October 1942

The 109th Rifle division was reformed on August 6, 1942, at Pulkovo in the 42nd Army of Leningrad Front from the 21st NKVD Rifle Division, which had been involved in the defense of the city for the previous twelve months. Its order of battle became:

- 381st Rifle Regiment - from the 6th NKVD Rifle Regiment (later 340th)
- 456th Rifle Regiment - from the 8th NKVD Rifle Regiment (later 317th)
- 602nd Rifle Regiment - from the 14th NKVD Rifle Regiment
- 404th Artillery Regiment
- 256th Antitank Battalion (from September 21, 1943)
- 23rd Antiaircraft Machine Gun Company (from August 20, 1944)
- 173rd Reconnaissance Company
- 229th Sapper Battalion
- 117th Signal Battalion (later 1011th Signal Company)
- 281st Medical/Sanitation Battalion
- 44th Chemical Defense (Anti-gas) Platoon
- 190th Motor Transport Company
- 173rd Field Bakery
- 992nd Divisional Veterinary Hospital
- 15th Field Postal Station
- 405th Field Office of the State Bank

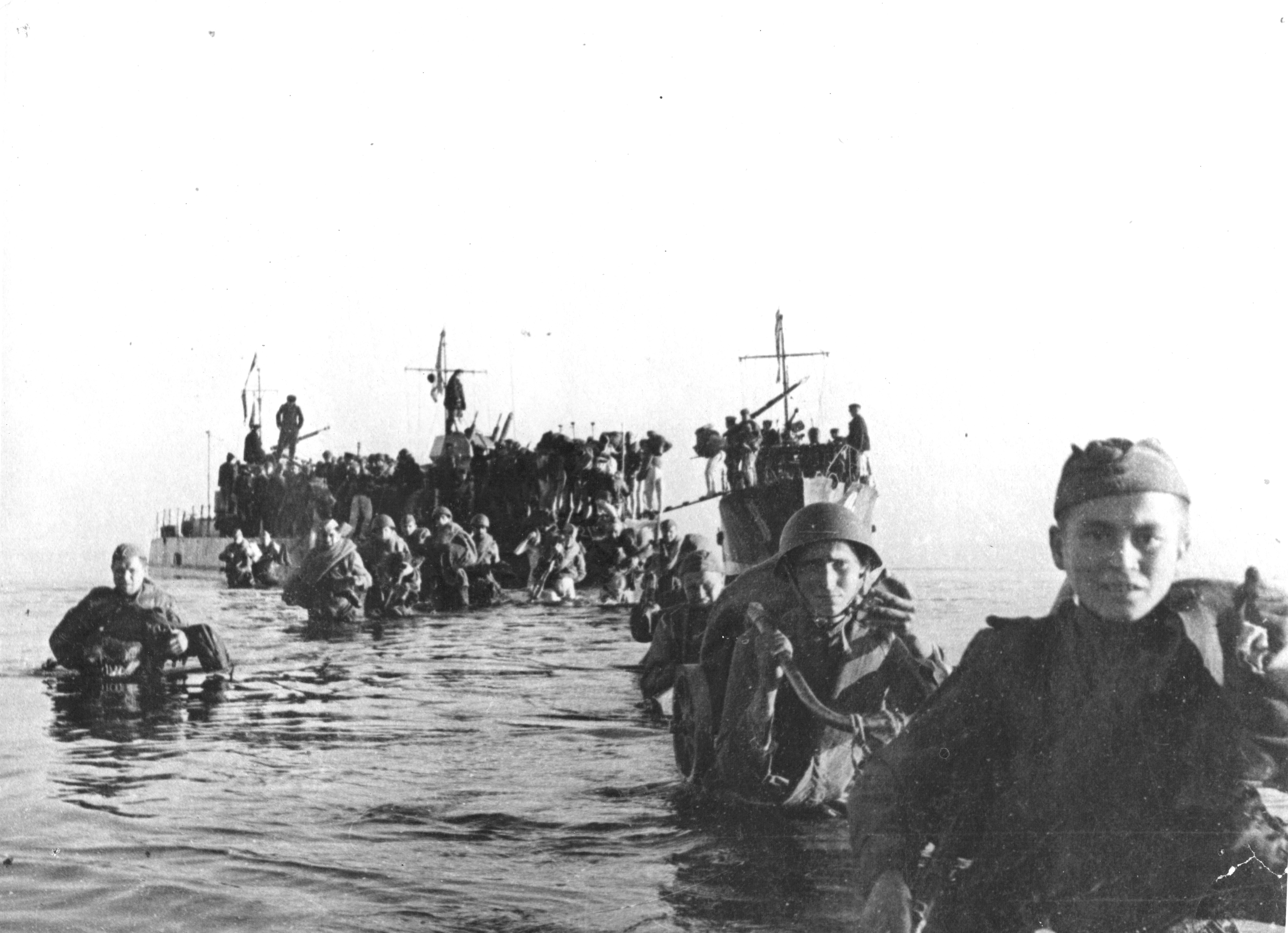
Troops from Senior Lieutenant Gorbunov's platoon landing on Saaremaa, 14 October 1944

Upon its redesignation, the division was under the command of Col. Mikhail Danilovich Papchenko, but he was replaced within a week by Col. Nikolai Andreevich Trushkin. Trushkin was promoted to Major General on April 21, 1943, and remained in this post for most of the rest of the war.

Just prior to its re-designation, between July 20–23, the division had taken part in an attack on the German-held fortified village of Staro-Panovo, southwest of the city, which succeeded in liberating the village and part of the adjoining Uritsk. Although the gains were small, it was the first time the German siege lines had been pushed back and held, boosting the morale of the defenders.

In the late autumn, the division was relieved from front-line duty for nearly a month for rebuilding and replenishment, then was deployed again to the Pulkovo sector, now facing the Spanish Blue Division. The Spanish were withdrawn from this sector on January 6, 1943, replaced by the German 23rd Infantry Division.

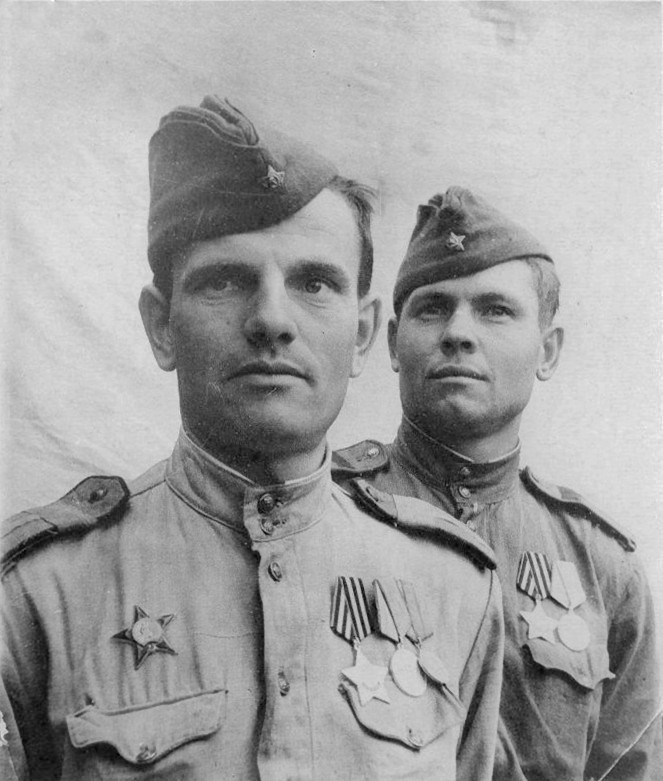
109th Rifle Division Starshinas Fyodor Ivanovich Ryabkov (squad leader of the 1011th Signal Company) and Dmitry Ivanovich Korotin (ammunition supply squad leader of the 602nd Rifle Regiment), awarded the Order of Glory, 1944

The 109th became part (somewhat confusingly) of the 109th Rifle Corps from November 1943, and remained in that Corps for the duration. In January 1944, 109th Corps left 42nd Army and was transferred to the 2nd Shock Army in the Oranienbaum Bridgehead. Later that month, the 2nd Shock Army took a leading part in the offensive that finally drove the German forces away from Leningrad.

In May, the 109th Rifle Division was transferred north to the 21st Army on the Karelian Isthmus as part of the upcoming Vyborg–Petrozavodsk Offensive, which aimed to force Finland out of the war. During the offensive, the 109th played a crucial role in breaching the second main Finnish defences, the partially-completed VT-line, at Kuuterselkä on June 15, capturing several strongpoints and forcing the Finns to retire to the VKT-line as a result. Following this, the division continued to advance on the right flank of the 21st Army, reaching positions about 15km east of Viipuri by July 15. On June 22, the division was awarded the battle honor "Leningrad" as well as the Order of the Red Banner for its role in the campaign.

With Finland out of the war, the 109th made its final transfer, to 8th Army in Estonia, near Narva, in August. Until the end of the war, the division assisted in clearing the Baltic coast as far as the Courland Peninsula. On several occasions, the division served as a "follow-on" force in amphibious operations against German forces on the Baltic islands, but it never led an amphibious assault landing. On December 16, General Trushkin left command of the division to Col. Moiseiy Yakovlevich Mones, but returned to the division on February 28, 1945.

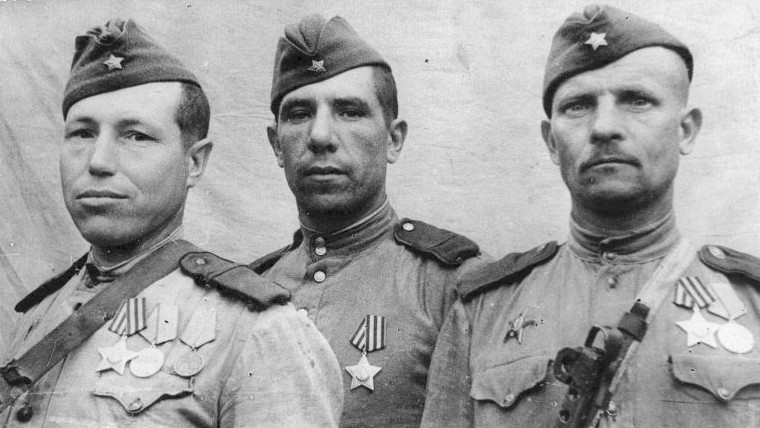
Recipients of the Order of Glory of the 109th Rifle Division: Telephonists Yefreytors S. A. Zhatkin and S. N. Semashkin, and gun commander Senior Sergeant Ivan Malkin of the 404th Artillery Regiment

The division ended the war as the 109th Rifle, Leningrad, Order of the Red Banner Division (Russian: 109-я стрелковая Ленинградская Краснознамённая дивизия).

== Postwar ==
The division was withdrawn with the 6th Rifle Corps to the Don Military District and was disbanded in spring 1946.
