= 21st Motor Rifle Division NKVD =

21st Motor Rifle Division VV NKVD (June 24 - September 1, 1941) 21st Rifle Division VV NKVD (September 1, 1941 - August 6, 1942)
- Active: 1941–1942
- Country: Soviet Union
- Type: Motorized Infantry, Infantry
- Size: Division
- Engagements: Continuation War; Siege of Leningrad

Commanders
- Notable commanders: Col. Mikhail Danilovich Papchenko

The 21st NKVD Motor Rifle Division was formed as a nominally motorized infantry division at the outbreak of the war with Germany, in the Leningrad Military District, based on several units of NKVD Operational Troops based in the Karelian Isthmus and nearby. After contesting the Finnish advance during July it was pulled back to Leningrad for garrison duties, and at the beginning of September it was restructured and redesignated as the 21st NKVD Rifle Division, soon being assigned to 42nd Army. It fought under this command for the next 11 months in the siege lines on the city's southwestern sector. In July 1942 it recaptured the first piece of territory within the German siege lines that remained permanently held. On August 6 it came under Red Army administration and was redesignated as the new 109th Rifle Division.

== Formation ==
The division began organizing on June 24, 1941, at Leningrad in the Leningrad Military District, which was redesignated as Northern Front the same day. Once formed the division's main order of battle was as follows:

- 13th NKVD Motorized Regiment - at Leningrad and Shlisselburg
- 14th NKVD Motorized Regiment - in the Vyborg area
- 15th NKVD Motorized Regiment - at Petrozavodsk
- 35th NKVD Motorized Regiment - at Volkhov and Shlisselburg

The division was "officially mobilized" on July 1. Many of the troops had combat experience dating back to the Winter War, where the 14th and 15th Regiments had won the Order of the Red Banner. NKVD Col. Mikhail Danilovich Papchenko, who had been in command of the 13th Regiment, was appointed to command of the division. In all it had 5,915 personnel under command.

== Continuation War ==
In prewar defense planning great importance was given to ensuring that regular Red Army forces would not provoke any potential enemies, specifically Germany and Finland. For this reason it was largely NKVD border guards and rifle forces that manned the defenses closest to the frontiers.

Finland entered the war against the USSR on June 25. On the first day a detachment of border guards came under attack near Lake Myarat on the distant approaches to Petrozavodsk, following an artillery preparation. An artillery battery of the 15th NKVD Regiment was brought up to provide support and soon forced the Finns to take cover. In reply, the battery came under artillery and mortar fire which damaged one gun, disabled several gun crews, and set an ammunition limber on fire. The battery's second in command, Jr. Lt. Aleksandr Andreevich Divochkin, took over from his slain commander and organized some of his remaining men to extinguish the fire, while with the remainder opened fire with the last two guns. Divochkin, despite two wounds, acted as gun layer on each gun alternately, causing some 30 Finnish casualties. The 15th Regiment eventually fell back to Leningrad and on August 26 Divochkin was made a Hero of the Soviet Union. He survived the war, rising to the rank of lieutenant colonel, but died "tragically" on August 19, 1946, at the age of 31.

Krasnoarmeets Anatoli Aleksandrovich Kokorin served as a medic in the 14th NKVD Regiment. On August 4 the regiment was in battle with the Finns near Khiytola when his 6th Company was ordered to plug a gap in the line. The company soon came under command of the regiment's political instructor, Battalion Commissar Nikolai Matveevich Rudenko. Kokorin gave aid to the wounded while under fire, moving the more severe cases to cover under Rudenko's orders, while also bringing forward ammunition. With nearly the entire company killed or wounded, Rudenko held off the attackers with machine gun fire despite suffering three wounds himself, the most serious of which was bandaged by Kokorin, probably saving his life. Rudenko eventually lost consciousness, and when Finnish soldiers finally reached their position Kokorin made a suicidal attack with a grenade. Rudenko eventually revived, buried Kokorin's body in a shellhole, and made his way to Soviet lines. Both men became Heroes of the Soviet Union on August 26. Rudenko later took part in operations in the German rear during the Battle of Moscow, helped provide security during the Tehran Conference, and participated in the Moscow Victory Parade with the rank of lieutenant colonel. He died on September 26, 1983.

The 21st was moved to the rear later that month and remained there until September 1 when it was reorganized, now as the 21st NKVD Rifle Division, with three regiments:

- 6th NKVD Rifle Regiment - from the Leningrad garrison
- 8th NKVD Rifle Regiment - from the Leningrad garrison
- 14th NKVD Rifle Regiment - from 14th NKVD Motorized Regiment

Just prior to this the division had incorporated 1,500 personnel of the Leningrad police. As well, the Kirov Plant supplied 75 repaired artillery pieces that lacked sights for indirect fire, and a further 18 guns mounted on various vehicles. Some 1,500 militiamen, most with artillery training, were assigned to man them. Over the next two weeks it also absorbed a large number of troops falling back from the fighting along the Narva River and at Kingisepp.

== Battle of Leningrad ==
On August 27 Northern Front was split into Leningrad Front and Karelian Front, with the former soon coming under command of Marshal K. E. Voroshilov. In the first week of September the German 18th Army and 4th Panzer Group were closing in on the city, and on September 8 the 20th Motorized Division captured Shlisselburg on Lake Ladoga, cutting the last land connection with the rest of the USSR. To the west, Voroshilov was defending against the XXXVIII Army Corps with his 42nd and 55th Armies, with 8th Army on the western flank. 42nd Army, supported by the Baltic Fleet, was assigned to the Krasnogvardeisk Fortified Region from Pustoshka to the Gulf of Finland.

During September 9-12 the German forces pushed closer to the outskirts of the city while both sides reinforced with all available forces. As this crisis developed Stalin appointed Army Gen. G. K. Zhukov to replace Voroshilov on September 9. Zhukov flew into the pocket the same day, by which time the German forces had taken Krasnoye Selo, the western part of Krasnogvardeisk Fortified Region, and reached the approaches to Uritsk. On September 13 the reinforced 42nd Army managed to retake some ground and halt the German advance, but was clearly close to collapse. On September 15 the XXXVIII Corps had closed to the outskirts of Uritsk and Volodarskii, just 4km from the Gulf coast, so Zhukov reinforced 42nd Army with the 21st NKVD, the 6th Division of National Opolchenie, and two naval rifle brigades, plus several detachments of Air Force troops. By this time the 21st had lost its 8th Regiment to the 20th NKVD Rifle Division. The next day this force took up second echelon positions behind the Army from the Gulf through Uritsk, the Meat Plant, and Rybatskoye to the Neva River. Zhukov absolutely forbade his commanders from moving any of their troops from this line without express permission, and this was backed up by Stalin. He also replaced the commander of the Army with his protege, Maj. Gen. I. I. Fedyuninskii. By September 30 he had managed to solidify his line from Uritsk to Nizhnoe Koirovo to Pulkovo.

Early in October a German force captured Uritsk and its associated Ligovo Station from the 21st NKVD. On October 13 XXXVIII Corps launched what was intended as the final battle for Leningrad, but this was held by the combined forces of the division, 6th DNO, and the naval riflemen, which even managed to retake some ground. From this point the battle became trench warfare, largely in and around the ruins of Uritsk. In the spring of 1942 the SS Panzergrenadier Regiment 23 Norge of 11th SS Panzergrenadier Division Nordland arrived in the lines. It launched an attack on April 16 which struck the 14th Regiment. After breaching the obstacles between the lines the SS men stormed the Soviet trenches, beginning hand-to-hand combat which cost the 14th some 200 casualties before the "Norwegians" were forced to retreat.

=== Staro-Panovo Operation ===
In June, Lt. Gen. L. A. Govorov took over command of Leningrad Front. The STAVKA anticipated a new German offensive toward the city, and in order to forestall it several local offensives were planned on the southern sector. The first of these was launched by 42nd Army's 21st NKVD and 85th Rifle Divisions. According to the Leningrad war diary:

Monday, 20 July. The 42nd Army's forces began an attack against the strongest enemy strong point in the Staro-Panovo region, less than 10 kilometres from the outskirts of Leningrad...
The regiments that received the immediate mission of capturing Staro-Panovo occupied their jumping-off positions at night. Once the artillery preparation ended in the morning, they advanced forward, supported by artillery, tanks, and aircraft. Thanks to this, they were soon able to capture Staro-Panovo.

Several groups of Soviet troops also reached Uritsk. Sen. Sgt. Yosif Yosifovich Pilyushin was a sniper of the 14th Regiment. In his memoirs he wrote:

Literally within the first several hours of the offensive, all the enemy's fortified lines were broken. Although we did not manage to exploit the initial successes, this offensive was a serious warning to the enemy.
Our artillery worked over the enemy lines for more than an hour. For the first time since the war began, I was witnessing the enormous firepower of massed Soviet artillery...
[After reaching the German trenches] we had liquidated the danger of a flank attack [with sniper fire], and our rifle battalion continued to push on to the ruins of Ligovo Station. This was the first piece of our land, ripped from the bloody paws of the fascist executioners in front of the walls of Leningrad. Fighting for this strip of ground had been going on for nine months, but now at last it was again ours. Inspired by this initial success, we occupied new lines, and continued to press the enemy.

The battle continued for 11 days, with German reinforcements arriving to erase some of the Soviet gains, but Ligovo Station was held.

According to GKO Resolution No. GOKO-2100ss of July 26, 1942 and a General Staff directive of August 2, the 21st NKVD was officially transferred to the Red Army and redesignated as the 3rd formation of the 109th Rifle Division on August 6.
