= 13th Rifle Division (Soviet Union) =

- Active: I Formation: 1922–1941; II Formation: 1941–1945
- Country: Soviet Union
- Branch: Red Army
- Type: Infantry
- Size: Division
- Engagements: World War II: Soviet invasion of Poland; Operation Barbarossa; Siege of Leningrad; Leningrad-Novgorod Offensive; Tallinn Offensive; Vistula-Oder Offensive; Upper Silesian Offensive; Prague Offensive
- Battle honours: Dagestan (1st formation); Dąbrowa (2nd formation)

Commanders
- Notable commanders: Andrei Naumov; Vladimir Rodionov

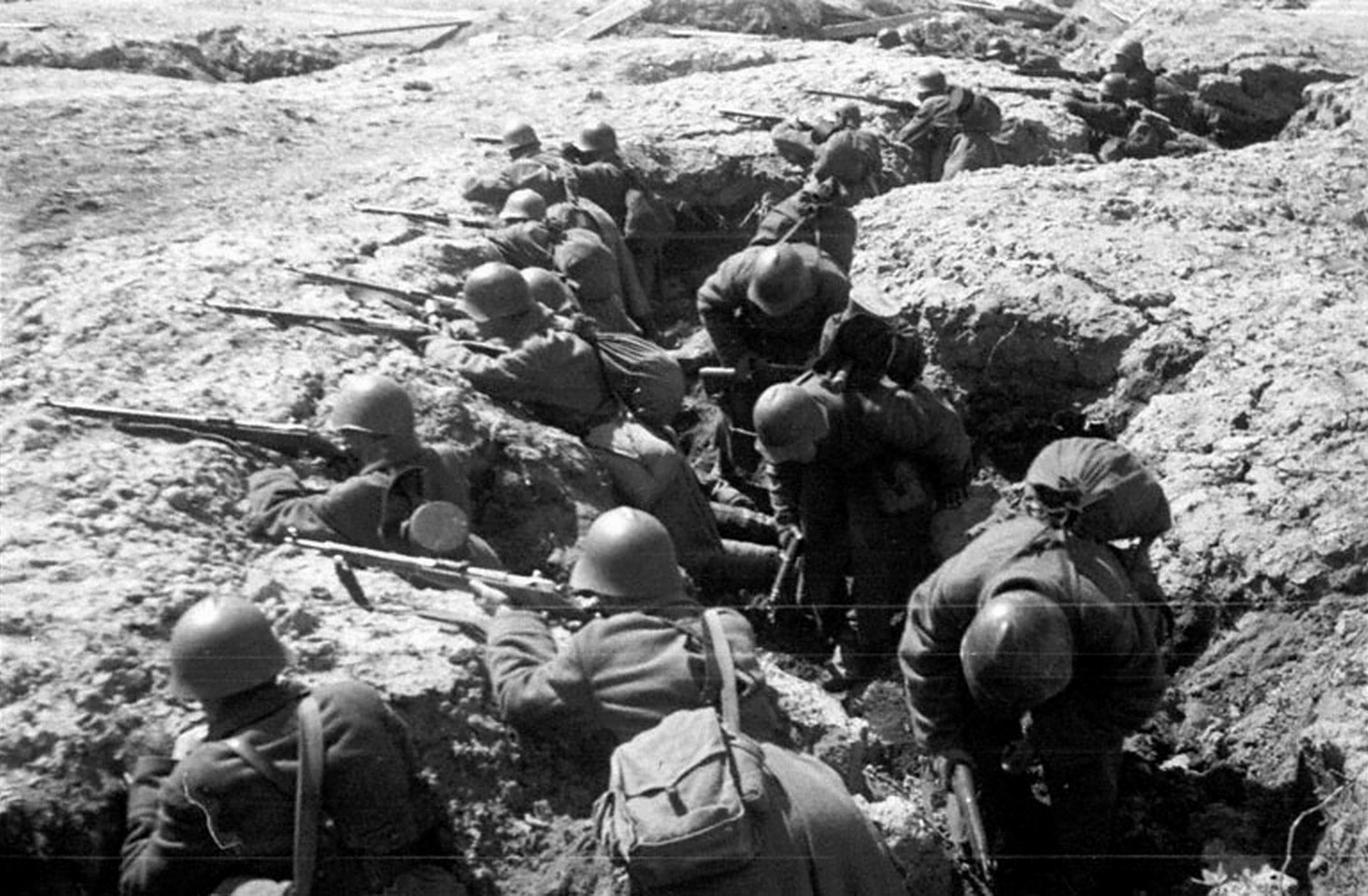
Soldiers of the division's blocking battalion firing at German positions from a trench, June 1942

The 13th Rifle Division was a military formation of the Red Army from 1922 to 1945. serving in World War II. It was disbanded after being defeated in 1941 and reformed from a Leningrad people's militia division later that year.

The division was formed 13.07.1922 in Dagestan (North Caucasus Military District) on the basis of the 1st Dagestan Rifle Brigade. It took the honorific 'Dagestan.' It took part in the Soviet invasion of eastern Poland in 1939. During the German-Soviet War it was listed as serving from June 22, 1941, to September 19, 1941.

On 22.06.1941, it was stationed at the border area Zambrów – Snyadovo, as part of the 5th Rifle Corps, 10th Army, itself part of the Western Front. June 22, 1941, was the first fight of the division, and on June 23 it retreated toward Białystok and on 24 June took up the defence of the river Narev. June 26, 1941, division received an order to retreat to Supraselskuyu Forest, where the division was falling apart in unorganized groups.

During late June – early July 1941 small groups from the division attempted to break through to the east, but were dispersed.

The division was formally disbanded on September 19, 1941. It was reformed later that year. During the Sandomierz–Silesian Offensive, the division helped capture Dąbrowa Górnicza on 27 January. For its actions, it was awarded the honorific "Dąbrowa".

With 59th Army of the 1st Ukrainian Front in May 1945. The second formation disbanded during the summer of 1945 "in place" with the Central Group of Forces.
