= Ivan Petrov (army general) =

Soviet general (1896–1958)

- Иван Ефимович Петров
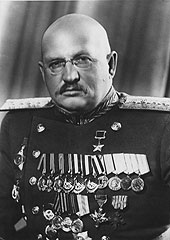
- Born: Ivan Yefimovich Petrov; 30 September [O.S. 18 September] 1896; Trubchevsk, Oryol Governorate, Russian Empire
- Died: 7 April 1958 (aged 61); Moscow, Russian SFSR, USSR
- Burial place: Novodevichy Cemetery
- Military career
- Allegiance: Soviet Union
- Branch: Red Army
- Service years: 1916–1958
- Rank: General of the Army
- Commands: 1st Cavalry Division; 25th Rifle Division; Separate Coastal Army; 44th Army; Black Sea Group of Forces; North Caucasus Front; 33rd Army; 2nd Belorussian Front; 4th Ukrainian Front; Turkestan Military District
- Conflicts: Russian Civil War; Polish–Soviet War; Basmachi Revolt; World War II
- Awards: Hero of the Soviet Union; Order of Lenin (5); Order of the Red Banner (4); Order of the Red Star (2); Order of Suvorov (3); Order of Kutuzov; Order of the Red Banner of Labour; Distinguished Service Cross (United States)

Signature
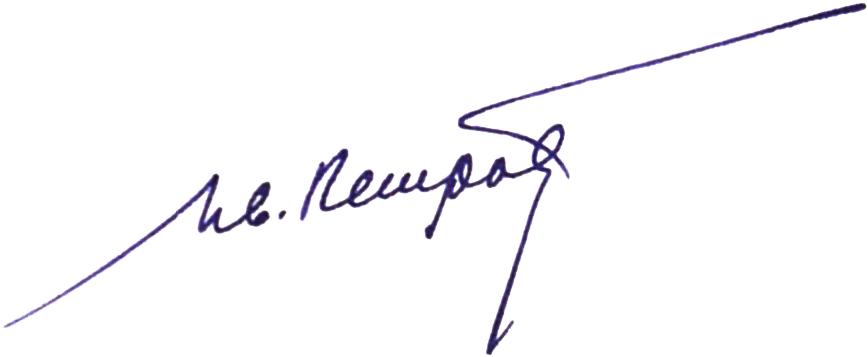

Ivan Yefimovich Petrov (Russian: Иван Ефимович Петров; 30 September [O.S. 18 September] 1896 – 7 April 1958) was a Soviet Army General.

== Early military career ==
Born in Trubchevsk in 1896, he began his military service in the Red Army in 1918, the year when he also joined the Bolshevik Party. Petrov fought in the Russian Civil War near Samara, the Polish–Soviet War in 1920 and the Basmachi rebellion in 1922. In the late 1920s and 1930s Petrov served in Central Asia.

== World War II ==
During World War II, Petrov participated in the Siege of Odessa, Siege of Sevastopol and was noted for heading the Separate Coastal Army from October 1941 to July 1942 and in November 1943-February 1944, 44th Army in August–October 1942, Black Sea Group of Forces, North Caucasus Front, 33rd Army in 1944, 2nd Belorussian Front, 4th Ukrainian Front, and several other units. In April–June 1945, Petrov was a chief of the 1st Ukrainian Front Staff.

== Awards ==
On May 29, 1945, Petrov was awarded the title of the Hero of the Soviet Union. The United States awarded him the Distinguished Service Cross in War Department General Order No. 3 of 1944.

After the war Petrov commanded the Turkestan Military District and was inspector general of land forces. Petrov died in Moscow in 1958 and is buried in the Novodevichy Cemetery.

== Honours and awards ==
- Hero of the Soviet Union
- Five Orders of Lenin
- Order of the Red Banner, four times
- Order of Suvorov, 1st class
- Order of Kutuzov, 1st class
- Order of the Red Star
- Order of the Red Banner of Labour of the Turkmen SSR
- Order of the Red Banner of Labour of the Uzbek SSR
- Order of the Red Banner of Labour
- Order of Merit, 1st class (Hungary)
- Military Order of the White Lion "For Victory", 2nd class (Czechoslovakia)
- War Cross, 1939 (Czechoslovakia)
- Order of the Cross of Grunwald, 3rd class (Poland)
- Medal of Victory and Freedom 1945 (Poland)
- Distinguished Service Cross (USA)
- Jubilee Medal "XX Years of the Workers' and Peasants' Red Army"
- Medal "For the Defence of Odessa"
- Medal "For the Defence of Sevastopol"
- Medal "For the Defence of the Caucasus"
- Medal "For the Victory over Germany in the Great Patriotic War 1941–1945"
- Medal "For the Capture of Berlin"
- Medal "For the Liberation of Prague"

== Commands Held ==
Military offices
Preceded by Unidentified	Commanding General of the 192nd Rifle Division; 1940	Succeeded by Unidentified
Preceded by Newly Formed	Commanding General of the 27th Mechanized Corps; 1941	Succeeded by Disbanded
Preceded by Unidentified	Commanding General of the 1st Cavalry Division; 1941	Succeeded by Unidentified
Preceded by Unidentified	Commanding General of the 2nd Cavalry Division; 1941	Succeeded by Unidentified
Preceded by Athanasius Zakharchenko	Commanding General of the 25th Rifle Division; 1941	Succeeded by Trofim Kolomiets
Preceded by Lieutenant Georgy Sofronov	Commanding General of the Separate Coastal Army; October 1941 – July 1942	Succeeded by Disbanded
Preceded by Andrei Khryashchev	Commanding General of the 44th Army; August 1942 – October 1942	Succeeded by Kondrat Melnik
Preceded by Yakov Cherevichenko	Commanding General of the Black Sea Group of Forces; October 1942 – March 1943	Succeeded by Disbanded
Preceded by Colonel General Ivan Maslennikov	Commander of the Northern Caucasian Front; March 1943 – 20 November 1943	Succeeded by Disbanded
Preceded by 2nd Formation of the Army (Command elements from Northern Caucasian Front)	Commander of the Coastal Army; 20 November 1943 – February 1944	Succeeded by Army General Andrey Yeryomenko
Preceded by General-Colonel Vasily Gordov	Commander of the 33rd Army; March 1944 – April 1944	Succeeded by General-Lieutenant Vasily Kryuchenkin
Preceded by Colonel General Pavel A. Kurochkin	Commander of the 2nd Belorussian Front; April 1944 – June 1944	Succeeded by General of the Army Georgii Zakharov
Preceded by Fyodor Tolbukhin	Commander of the 4th Ukrainian Front; 1944 – April 1945	Succeeded by Army General Andrey Yeryomenko
Preceded by Vasily Sokolovsky	Chief of Staff of the 1st Ukrainian Front; April 1945 – June 1945	Succeeded by Disbanded to form the Central Group of Forces
Preceded by Reformed from the Split of the Central Asian Military District; Command staff came from the 1st Shock Army	Commander of the Turkestan Military District; 9 July 1945 – 1952	Succeeded by Alexei Radzievsky
