= 2nd Cavalry Division (Soviet Union) =

- Active: August 1941 - November 1941
- Country: Soviet Union
- Branch: Soviet Army
- Type: Cavalry
- Role: Cavalry Support and Attack
- Size: Division
- Part of: Separate Coastal Army

Commanders
- Lieutenant General: Ivan Yefimovich Petrov

The 2nd Cavalry Division was a Division of the Red Army that existed during World War II.

== History ==
The 2nd Cavalry Division (2nd Formation) was a cavalry division of the Red Army that existed in 1941. The division was formed from the original 1st Odessa Cavalry Division in early 1941. It only had a short history as it was re-organized into the 2nd Rifle Division (3rd Formation) in late November 1941.

== Organization on Formation ==
Structure of the division in August 1941:

- Headquarters
- 7th Cavalry Regiment
- 16th Cavalry Regiment
- 20th Cavalry Regiment (Led by Ilya A. Lukanov, 1899-1942)

== Organization on Disbandment ==
Structure of the division in November 1941:

- Headquarters
- 7th Cavalry Regiment
- 15th Cavalry Regiment
- 20th Cavalry Regiment
- 9th Armoured Cavalry Squadron
- Armoured Defense Group
- 3rd Naval Infantry Regiment (attached)
- 323rd Separate Anti-Aircraft Artillery Divizion (battalion)
- Mortar Platoon
- Machine-Gun Platoon
- Separate Cavalry Squadron
- Separate Communications Squadron
- Separate Chemical Defense Squadron
