= Likhvinsky Uyezd =

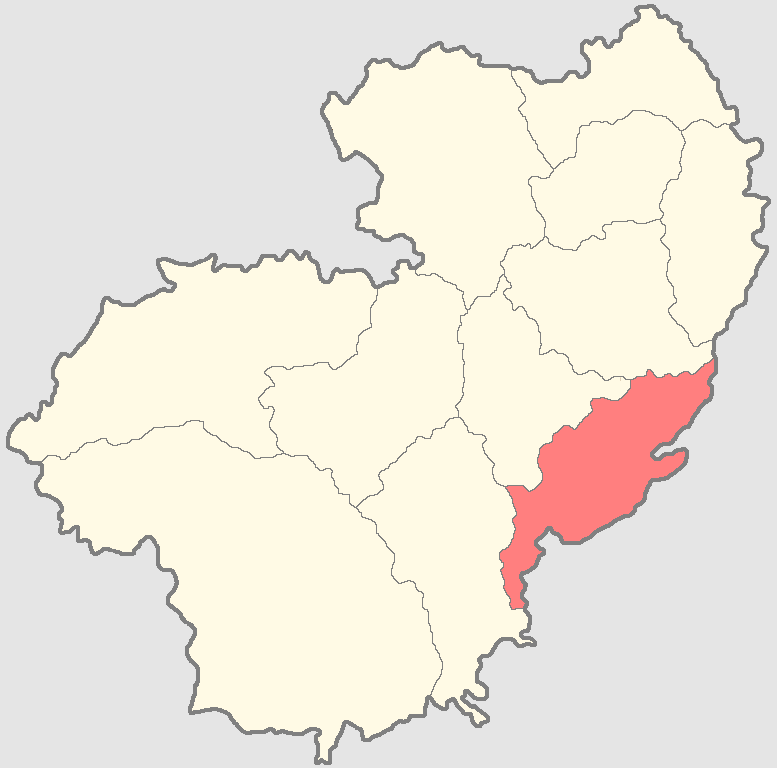
Likhvinsky District on the map of Kaluga Governorate

Likhvinsky Uyezd (Ли́хвинский уе́зд) was one of the subdivisions of the Kaluga Governorate of the Russian Empire. It was situated in the eastern part of the governorate. Its administrative centre was Likhvin (Chekalin).

== Demographics ==
At the time of the Russian Empire Census of 1897, Likhvinsky Uyezd had a population of 86,888. Of these, 99.9% spoke Russian as their native language.
