= 42nd Army (Soviet Union) =

- 42-я армия
- Active: 4 Aug 1941 – 1945/46
- Country: Soviet Union
- Type: Combined Arms
- Size: Field army
- Part of: Leningrad Front; 3rd Baltic Front; 2nd Baltic Front
- Engagements: Leningrad Strategic Defensive; Siege of Leningrad; Leningrad–Novgorod Offensive; Pskov-Ostrov Offensive; Krasnoye Selo–Ropsha Offensive; Riga Offensive; Courland Pocket

The 42nd Army (Russian: 42-я армия) was a field army of the Soviet Union's Red Army, created in 1941.

Created on 5 August 1941. Formed on the basis of the 50th Rifle Corps under the command of Major General Vladimir Ivanovich Shcherbakov. The army initially consisted of the 291st Rifle Division and the 2nd and 3rd Guards Leningrad Peoples' Militia Divisions. The 51st Corps, 690th Anti-Tank and 740th Artillery Regiments, and the Krasnogvardeisk Fortified Region soon joined the Army. Sources disagree on when the army was disbanded; V.I. Feskov et al. 2004 says that it 'ceased to exist in Summer 1945;' his later corrected edition of 2013 specifies 30 July 1945 (V.I. Feskov et al 2013, 131) while David Glantz in an earlier 2009 document lists the army on an order of battle for November 1945 in the Baltic Military District with no forces assigned. He also says it was 'disbanded in 1946.'

== History ==
=== 1941–1943 ===
During August 1941 the army formed a defensive line to the west, northwest and southwest of Krasnogvardeisk. By 19 August 1941, the leading German troops (1st and 8th Panzer Divisions) were fighting the troops of the Krasnogvardeisk Fortified Region. The army's final line of defence was formed on August 21, 1941, when German troops were forced to suspend the offensive in the south-western approaches to Krasnogvardeisk and go on the defensive. The 2nd Guards People's Militia Division especially distinguished itself during the fighting.

The army took part in the Leningrad Strategic Defensive operation from 9–30 September 1941. Conducted combat operations in the approaches to Leningrad from the Gulf of Finland to the city of Pushkin.

Composition on 1 September 1941:

2nd Guards Leningrad People's Militia Division
3rd Guards Leningrad People's Militia Division (minus 2nd Rifle Regiment)
Krasnogvardeisk Fortified Region
51st Corps Artillery Regiment
690th Antitank Artillery Regiment
Mixed Artillery Regiment
704th Artillery Regiment (198th Motorized Division)
42nd Pontoon-Bridge Battalion
106th Motorized Engineer Battalion

Composition on 1 October 1941:

13th Rifle Division
44th Rifle Division
56th Rifle Division
189th Rifle Division
21st Rifle Division (NKVD)
6th Naval Infantry Brigade
7th Naval Infantry Brigade
268th Machine-Gun Artillery Battalion
282nd Machine-Gun Artillery Battalion
291st Machine-Gun Artillery Battalion
14th Antitank Brigade
28th Corps Artillery Regiment
47th Corps Artillery Regiment
51st Corps Artillery Regiment
73rd Corps Artillery Regiment
101st Howitzer Artillery Regiment (RVGK)
704th Artillery Regiment
296th Antitank Artillery Battalion
1st Separate Mortar Battalion
2nd Separate Mortar Battalion
3rd Separate Mortar Battalion
Separate Guards Mortar Battalion
51st Tank Battalion
29th Sapper Battalion
456th Sapper Battalion

The army's intensive fight for the defense of Leningrad began on 9 September 1941. At this time the army occupied a line from Trinty to the southeast to Krasnogvardeisk. From north to south the following units occupied the line; 264th Machine-Gun Artillery Battalion, 3rd Guards Leningrad People's Militia Division, 277th, 4th, 265th, 276th Machine-Gun Artillery Battalion 2nd Guards Leningrad People's Militia Division, 126th and 267th Machine-Gun Artillery Battalions. On the right flank of was the 8th Army defending Oranienbaum and to the east the 55th Army. Against this Army Group North sent the 291st, 58th, 1st Infantry, 30th Motorized, 1st and 6th Panzer Divisions. The SS Police Division and the 269th Infantry Divisions reinforced the attack.

At the start of the German offensive the 42nd Army was composed mostly of militia units and inexperienced soldiers and lacking in weapons, ammunition, transport and communications. The 1st Panzer Division arrived on 10 September 1941 to continue the advance, and forced the 3rd Guards People's Militia Division back. Meanwhile, parts of the 42nd Army continued to defend Krasnogvardeisk stubbornly, despite German troops reaching the rear of the fortified area, threatening to cut off their communications completely, as well as the linkages with the neighboring 55th Army. The 42nd Army only left Krasnogvardeisk on September 13, 1941, after intense street fighting. The remnants of the army were forced to take up new line of defense. During the night of 12–13 September took up positions of the Pulkovski defensive line, extending from Strelna through Konstantinovka, Finskoye Koyrovo, Upper Koyrovo, Upper Kuzmin near the Kuzminka River, and Pulkovo Heights. From 12–15 September the front added a rifle division, a NKVD division, two militia divisions, two antitank brigades and several rifle brigades.

From 13–15 September the army conducted a stubborn defensive battle, interspersed with counterattacks all along its front. On 15 September German forces broke through to Strelna, cutting off part of the 10th and 11th Rifle Divisions on the right flank of the army. From 17–21 September the army attacked Uritsk trying to reconnect with the 8th Army, but with no success. The last attempt to break through the defensive lines was on 23 September on the armies right flank in the Pulkovo Heights area but the attack was repelled. On 30 September the army participated in the operation to take Uritskom, Pine Glade, village Volodarskogo and output to Strelna, where parts of the army were to meet with a sea landing, but the operation was unsuccessful.

The defensive line had stabilized by 23 September with the army occupying a 16.5 kilometers front from the Gulf of Finland to the junction with the 55th Army at Pulkovo. The forward line of troops extended from the eastern edge of Uritsk, eastern outskirts of the old-Panov, New Koyrovo, and the southwestern outskirts of Pulkovo. By 1 November the front expanded by 10.5 kilometers before crossing the Vitebsk Railway line at Kolpino, and then further to the outskirts of Putrolovo finally reaching a total length of 36 kilometers. The army defended this line until January 1944.

During the period September 1941 to January 1944, the army was focused on improving the defense lines. An important mission for the army was Counter-battery fire against enemy long-range artillery firing on Leningrad. In January 1943 the army allocated half of it forces to participate in Operation Spark, an attempt to break the blockade of Leningrad.

Composition on 1 January 1942:

13th Rifle Division
189th Rifle Division
21st Rifle Division (NKVD)
247th Machine-Gun Artillery Battalion
291st Machine-Gun Artillery Battalion
292nd Machine-Gun Artillery Battalion
14th Antitank Brigade
47th Artillery Regiment
73rd Artillery Regiment
541st Howitzer Artillery Regiment
1st Antitank Artillery Regiment
2nd Antitank Artillery Regiment
3rd Antitank Artillery Regiment
4th Antitank Artillery Regiment
5th Antitank Artillery Regiment
3rd Special-power Artillery Battalion
72nd Antiaircraft Artillery Battalion
89th Antiaircraft Artillery Battalion
51st Tank Battalion
29th Engineer Battalion
54th Engineer Battalion
106th Engineer Battalion

Composition on 1 July 1942:

13th Rifle Division
21st Rifle Division
72nd Rifle Division
85th Rifle Division
189th Rifle Division
34th Machine-Gun Artillery Battalion
247th Machine-Gun Artillery Battalion
291st Machine-Gun Artillery Battalion
292nd Machine-Gun Artillery Battalion
339th Machine-Gun Artillery Battalion
14th Guards Artillery Regiment
73rd Army Artillery Regiment
541st Howitzer Artillery Regiment
289th Light Artillery Regiment
304th Light Artillery Regiment
509th Light Artillery Regiment
705th Light Artillery Regiment
706th Light Artillery Regiment
884th Light Artillery Regiment
72nd Antiaircraft Artillery Battalion
89th Antiaircraft Artillery Battalion
2nd Separate Armored Car Battalion
72nd Armored Train Battalion
29th Engineer Battalion
54th Engineer Battalion
585th Engineer Battalion

Composition on 1 January 1943:

85th Rifle Division
109th Rifle Division
125th Rifle Division
189th Rifle Division
79th Fortified Region
14th Guards Artillery Regiment
289th Tank Destroyer Regiment
304th Tank Destroyer Regiment
384th Tank Destroyer Regiment
509th Tank Destroyer Regiment
705th Tank Destroyer Regiment
760th Tank Destroyer Regiment
533rd Mortar Regiment (unnumbered Artillery Division)
474th Antiaircraft Artillery Regiment
71st Antiaircraft Artillery Battalion
1st Tank Brigade
31st Separate Guards Tank Regiment
1st Separate Armored Car Battalion
2nd Separate Armored Car Battalion
54th Engineer Battalion
585th Engineer Battalion
914th Mixed Aviation Regiment

Composition on 1 July 1943:

56th Rifle Division
85th Rifle Division
109th Rifle Division
125th Rifle Division
189th Rifle Division
79th Fortified Region
18th Artillery Division

65th Light Artillery Brigade
51st Gun Artillery Brigade
38th Howitzer Artillery Brigade
15th Mortar Brigade

12th Guards Artillery Regiment
14th Guards Artillery Regiment
73rd Gun Artillery Regiment
1486th Gun Artillery Regiment
324th High-power Howitzer Artillery Regiment
304th Tank Destroyer Regiment
384th Tank Destroyer Regiment
509th Tank Destroyer Regiment
705th Tank Destroyer Regiment
760th Tank Destroyer Regiment
533rd Mortar Regiment
534th Mortar Regiment
320th Guards Mortar Regiment
7th Antiaircraft Artillery Division

465th Antiaircraft Artillery Regiment
474th Antiaircraft Artillery Regiment
602nd Antiaircraft Artillery Regiment
632nd Antiaircraft Artillery Regiment

631st Antiaircraft Artillery Regiment
72nd Antiaircraft Artillery Battalion
1st Tank Brigade
49th Separate Guards Tank Regiment
1439th SU Regiment
2nd Separate Armored Car Battalion
72nd Armored Train Battalion
54th Engineer Battalion
585th Engineer Battalion

=== 1944 ===
The army participated in the Leningrad-Novgorod and Pskov-Ostrov operations, the later while assigned to the 3rd Baltic Front.

In the late hours of January 13, 1944, long-range bombers from the Baltic Fleet attacked the main German command points on the defensive line, presaging the Krasnoye Selo-Ropsha Offensive. On January 14, troops from both the Oranienbaum foothold and Volkhov Front attacked, followed the next day by troops of the 42nd Army under the command of Ivan Maslennikov from the Pulkovo Heights. An artillery barrage was launched all along the front, laying down 220,000 shells onto the German lines. Fog inhibited major progress for the first few days, although the 2nd Shock Army and 42nd Army advanced two miles on a seven-mile front while in combat with the 9th and 10th Luftwaffe Field Divisions.

The 42nd Army was tasked with breaking through the heavily fortified bands of enemy defenses established over the past two years. The 42nd Army first was to strike west to connect with the 2nd Shock Army advancing from the Oranienbaum bridgehead. Before the operation, 42nd Army was significantly reinforced; the main striking force of the army was the 30th Guards Rifle Corps. Soviet troops confronted L Army Corps (126th, 170th, 215th Infantry Divisions). The German artillery group consisted of 43 artillery battalions, 12 divisional artillery battalions (summarized in the 125th, 240th, 215th and 11th Artillery Regiments) and 31 from OKH reserve. The front line of defense was from the coast of the Gulf of Finland to the river Izhorka Popova in the east. In the main line of defense, there were 13 German centers of resistance: Uritsk, Old Panov, Novo-Panov, Finnish Koyrovo, Kokkolevo rarely Kuzmino - Alexandrovka Big Kuzmino station Children's Village, New, State Farm "Pushkin", settlement Volodarskogo Pushkin and Slutsk. In total, there were 34 centers of resistance strongpoints. The total depth of the enemy defense reached 13–15 kilometers. It took the army two full days to break through the left flank of the German lines. On the right flank was not as successful, with the army taking almost a week to break through the front lines and into the German rear areas.

Composition on 1 January 1944:

30th Guards Rifle Corps

45th Guards Rifle Division
63rd Guards Rifle Division
64th Guards Rifle Division

109th Rifle Corps

72nd Rifle Division
109th Rifle Division
125th Rifle Division

110th Rifle Corps

56th Rifle Division
85th Rifle Division
86th Rifle Division

79th Fortified Region
18th Artillery Penetration Division

65th Light Artillery Brigade
58th Howitzer Artillery Brigade
3rd Heavy Howitzer Brigade
80th Heavy Artillery Brigade
120th High-power Howitzer Artillery Brigade
42nd Mortar Brigade

23rd Artillery Penetration Division

79th Light Artillery Brigade
38th Howitzer Artillery Brigade
2nd Heavy Howitzer Brigade
96th Heavy Howitzer Brigade
21st Guards High-power Howitzer Artillery Brigade
28th Mortar Brigade

1157th Corps Artillery Regiment
1106th Gun Artillery Regiment
1486th Gun Artillery Regiment
52nd Guards Heavy Gun Artillery Battalion
304th Tank Destroyer Regiment
384th Tank Destroyer Regiment
509th Tank Destroyer Regiment
705th Tank Destroyer Regiment
1973rd Tank Destroyer Regiment
104th Mortar Regiment
174th Mortar Regiment
533rd Mortar Regiment
534th Mortar Regiment
20th Guards Mortar Regiment (minus 211th Battalion)
38th Guards Mortar Regiment
320th Guards Mortar Regiment
321st Guards Mortar Regiment
7th Antiaircraft Artillery Division

465th Antiaircraft Artillery Regiment
474th Antiaircraft Artillery Regiment
602nd Antiaircraft Artillery Regiment
632nd Antiaircraft Artillery Regiment

32nd Antiaircraft Artillery Division

1377th Antiaircraft Artillery Regiment
1387th Antiaircraft Artillery Regiment
1393rd Antiaircraft Artillery Regiment
1413th Antiaircraft Artillery Regiment

631st Antiaircraft Artillery Regiment
72nd Antiaircraft Artillery Battalion
220th Tank Brigade
31st Separate Guards Tank Regiment
46th Separate Guards Tank Regiment
49th Separate Guards Tank Regiment
205th Separate Tank Regiment
260th Separate Tank Regiment
1439th SU Regiment
1902nd SU Regiment
2nd Separate Armored Car Battalion
71st Armored Train Battalion
72nd Armored Train Battalion
54th Engineer Battalion
585th Engineer Battalion

Composition on 1 September 1944:

93rd Rifle Corps

219th Rifle Division
379th Rifle Division
391st Rifle Division

110th Rifle Corps

2nd Rifle Division
168th Rifle Division
268th Rifle Division

124th Rifle Corps

48th Rifle Division
123rd Rifle Division
256th Rifle Division

141st Gun Artillery Brigade
304th Tank Destroyer Regiment
311th Guards Tank Destroyer Regiment (6th Guards Antitank Artillery Brigade)
122nd Mortar Regiment
93rd Guards Mortar Regiment
310th Guards Mortar Regiment
42nd Antiaircraft Artillery Division

620th Antiaircraft Artillery Regiment
709th Antiaircraft Artillery Regiment
714th Antiaircraft Artillery Regiment
729th Antiaircraft Artillery Regiment

631st Antiaircraft Artillery Regiment
64th Guards Antiaircraft Artillery Battalion
1297th SU Regiment
24th Engineer-Sapper Brigade

=== 1945 ===
Conducted a number of attacks against the German Army Group Courland positions. The attacks were conducted on 20–28 February 1945, again on 17 March 1945 but were unsuccessful. The army was still on the front lines for the surrender of the Army Group Courland.

Order of Battle as of 1 April 45:

23rd Guards Rifle Corps‡

51st Guards Rifle Division‡
67th Guards Rifle Division‡

8th Estonian Rifle Corps‡

7th Estonian Rifle Division‡
249th Estonian Rifle Division‡

122nd Rifle Corps†

56th Rifle Division†
85th Rifle Division†
332nd Rifle Division‡

130th Latvian Rifle Corps

43rd Guards Rifle Division
308th Latvian Rifle Division

118th Fortified Region
27th Artillery Division‡

78th Light Artillery Brigade‡
74th Howitzer Artillery Brigade‡
76th Gun Artillery Brigade‡
783rd Artillery Reconnaissance Battalion‡

69th Light Artillery Brigade (6th Guards Artillery Penetration Division)‡†
141st Gun Artillery Brigade
87th Heavy howitzer Artillery Brigade (6th Guards Artillery Penetration Division)‡†
395th Howitzer Regiment‡
304th Tank Destroy Regiment
4th Mortar Brigade (6th Guards Artillery Penetration Division)‡†
122nd Mortar Regiment
14th Guards Mortar Brigade‡
72nd Guards Mortar Regiment
93rd Guards Mortar Regiment‡
310th Guards Mortar Regiment
42nd Antiaircraft Artillery Division

620th Antiaircraft Artillery Regiment
709th Antiaircraft Artillery Regiment
714th Antiaircraft Artillery Regiment
729th Antiaircraft Artillery Regiment

631st Antiaircraft Artillery Regiment
32nd Guards Tank Regiment‡
1052nd SU Regiment
1503rd SU Regiment‡
24th Engineer-Sapper Brigade
54th Motorized Pontoon-Bridge Battalion‡
45th Flamethrower Battalion

† Located in the Far East by November 1945 ‡ Removed from the army by 1 May 1945

Before the war ended the Army was already drawing down forces. A few of the forces headed east for the attack on Japan. More were to be demobilized.

== Commanders ==
- Major General Vladimir Ivanovich Shcherbakov - (5 August – 1 September, 1941)
- Lieutenant General Fedor Sergeevich Ivanov - (1 September – 15 September, 1941)
- Major General I. I. Fedyuninsky - (16 September – 24 October, 1941)
- Major General Ivan Nikolaev - (24 October 1941 – 23 December 1943)
- Colonel General I. I. Maslennikov - (23 December 1943 – 14 March 1944)
- Lieutenant General Vladimir Zakharovich Romanovsky - (14 March – 24 March, 1944)
- Lieutenant General Vladimir Petrovich Sviridov - (24 March 1944 – 9 May 1945)
