= 2nd Rifle Division (Soviet Union) =

- Active: I Formation: 1919–19 September 1941 II Formation: 26 September–23 November 1941; III Formation: 23 November 1941–29 January 1942 IV Formation: 21 December 1941–30 December 1945
- Country: Soviet Union
- Branch: Red Army
- Type: Infantry
- Size: Division
- Engagements: Russian Civil War: Eastern Front of the Russian Civil War; Defense of Petrograd; Latvian War of Independence; Polish-Soviet War: Battle of Warsaw (1920); Soviet invasion of Poland; World War II: Battle of Białystok–Minsk; Battle of Moscow; Siege of Sevastopol (1941–42); Sinyavino Offensive (1942); Mga Offensive; Leningrad–Novgorod Offensive; Baltic Offensive; Riga Offensive (1944); Courland Pocket
- Decorations: Honorary Revolutionary Red Banner (1st formation); Order of Kutuzov (3rd formation)
- Battle honours: Belorussian (1st formation) named for M.V. Frunze (1st formation) Masurian (3rd formation)

Commanders
- Notable commanders: Aleksandr Loktionov Ivan Konev Vladimir Vashkevich

The 2nd Rifle Division was a rifle division of the Red Army that served from the Russian Civil War to the Second World War. Originally formed in 1919 from the 1st Ryazansk Rifle Division, the division was twice destroyed and reformed during the war. The division contained two or three rifle regiments.

== Russian Civil War ==
The 2nd Rifle Division was formed in Moscow in September 1918. It fought at Ufa on the Eastern Front in April–July 1919. Then it fought against Yudenich with the 7th Army in October–December 1919. Finally it fought in the Polish Campaign on the Western Front in May–August 1920, and against Bulak-Balakhovich in October 1920.

== Second World War ==
During the war there were four distinct formations that bore the title of 2nd Rifle Division.

=== 1st Formation ===
Formed in 1919 in the Belorussian Military District. On 22 June 1941 the division was part of the 1st Rifle Corps, 10th Army and took up defensive positions on the right flank of the army stationed in the Bialystok "bulge". The division escaped from the Bialystok pocket only to be annihilated by the German army in a pocket west of Minsk in early July 1941. The division was removed from the Soviet order of battle on 24 July 1941 and officially disbanded on 19 September 1941.

- 13th Rifle Regiment (originally 4th Rifle Regiment)
- 200th Rifle Regiment (originally 5th Rifle Regiment)
- 261st Rifle Regiment (originally 6th Rifle Regiment)
- 164th Light Artillery Regiment (originally 2nd Artillery Regiment)
- 243rd Howitzer Regiment (possibly formed after September 1939)
- 70th Antitank Battalion
- 94th Antiaircraft Battalion
- 320th Sapper Battalion
- 91st Medical Battalion
- 87th Decontamination Platoon
- 84th Auto-Transport Battalion

The full honorific title of the division was the 2nd Belorussian Red Banner Rifle Division in the name of M.V. Frunze.

=== 2nd Formation ===
Formed from the 2nd Moscow Militia Division on 26 September 1941, the second formation served in the 32nd Army. The division received new equipment to supplement the equipment issued by the Moscow Militia. With the start of the German offensive against the Western Front at the end of September the division was forced into combat before it was fully brought up to strength. By 10 October 1941 the division had been driven into the 19th Army's and was encircled and destroyed by the Germans in the Vyazma pocket in October 1941. The division was destroyed by the end of October and officially removed from the order of battle on 23 November 1941.

- 1282nd Rifle Regiment from 4th Militia Regiment
- 1284th Rifle Regiment from 5th Militia Regiment
- 1286th Rifle Regiment from 6th Militia Regiment
- 970th Artillery Regiment from Artillery Regiment (no number)
- 694th Separate Antitank Artillery Battalion
- 469th Reconnaissance Company
- 858th Separate Signals Battalion
- 492nd Medical Battalion
- 331st Decontamination Company
- 328th Auto-Transport Company

=== 3rd Formation ===
Formed in Sevastopol fortress on 23 November 1941 from the dismounted 2nd Cavalry Division, this formation served with the Separate Coastal Army and was renamed the 109th Rifle Division on 29 January 1942.

- 383rd Rifle Regiment (formed from NKVD Border Troops)(renumbered 381st Rifle Regiment 29 January 1942)
- 1330th Rifle Regiment (reservists)(renumbered 456th Rifle Regiment 29 January 1942)
- Mixed Rifle Regiment (Border Troops plus dismounted cavalry)(becomes 602nd Rifle Regiment 29 January 1942)
- 51st Artillery Regiment (from Corps troops)(renumbered 404th Artillery Regiment 29 January 1942)
- 105th Medical Battalion (renumbered 93rd Medical Battalion 29 January 1942)

=== 4th Formation ===
Commenced forming in Arkhangelsk on 21 December 1941 possibly from the 410th Rifle Division. By the end of March 1942 the division was "ready" for combat and transferred to the Volkhov Front. The division took part in numerous operations, including the rescue of 2nd Shock Army (May-Jul 1942), Operation Iskra in January 1943, and the Leningrad-Novograd Strategic Offensive Operation in early 1944. During the summer of 1944 the division took part in the operations to clear the Baltic States, ending in Estonia at the end of 1944. During December 1944 the division was transferred to the 2nd Belorussian Front's 50th Army. It took part in the East Prussian Strategic Offensive Operation ending the war near Königsberg as part of the 81st Rifle Corps in the 3rd Belorussian Front. With the 81st Rifle Corps, it was withdrawn to the Kiev Military District and disbanded with the corps on 30 December 1945.

- 13th Rifle Regiment (II)
- 200th Rifle Regiment (II)
- 261st Rifle Regiment (II)
- 164th Artillery Regiment
- 70th Separate Antitank Artillery Battalion
- 96th Mortar Battalion (until 29 October 1942)
- 59th Reconnaissance Company
- 15th Sapper Battalion
- 192nd Separate Signals Battalion (formally the 773 Sep Signals Company, 43 Sep Signals Battalion)
- 91st Medical Battalion
- 497th Decontamination Company
- 84th Auto-Transport Company

== Subordination ==
Date	Front (District)	Army	Corps	Notes
1 January 1942	Arkhangelsk Military District			
1 April 1942	Volkhov Front			
1 May 1942	Leningrad Front (Group troops Volkhov direction)	59th Army		
1 June 1942	Leningrad Front (Volkhov military force)	59th Army		
1 July 1942	Volkhov Front	59th Army		
1 October 1943	Volkhov Front	4th Army		
1 December 1943	Volkhov Front	59th Army		
1 January 1944	Volkhov Front	59th Army	112th Rifle Corps	
1 March 1944	Leningrad Front	8th Army	112th Rifle Corps	
1 September 1944	2nd Baltic Front	42nd Army	110th Rifle Corps	
1 November 1944	2nd Baltic Front	42nd Army	124th Rifle Corps	
1 December 1944	2nd Baltic Front	42nd Army		
1 January 1945	2nd Belarusian Front	50th Army		
1 February 1945	3rd Belorussian Front	50th Army	81st Rifle Corps	
1 May 1945	3rd Belorussian Front	50th Army	81st Rifle Corps	

== External links and Sources ==
- Journal of the Soviet Army

== See also ==
- List of infantry divisions of the Soviet Union 1917–1957
