= 128th Rifle Division =

128th Rifle Division (August 19, 1939 – July 1945)
- Active: 1939–1945
- Country: Soviet Union
- Branch: Red Army (1939-46)
- Type: Infantry
- Size: Division
- Engagements: Winter War; Operation Barbarossa; Baltic operation Luga Defensive Line; Siege of Leningrad; Sinyavino offensive (1942); Operation Iskra; Mga offensive Leningrad–Novgorod offensive Krasnoye Selo–Ropsha offensive Kingisepp–Gdov offensive Pskov-Ostrov offensive Tartu offensive Sandomierz–Silesian offensive Upper Silesian offensive Prague offensive
- Decorations: Order of the Red Banner
- Battle honours: Pskov

Commanders
- Notable commanders: Maj. Gen. Aleksandr Semyonovich Zotov; Col. Fyodor Ivanovich Komarov; Maj. Gen. Ivan Fyodorovich Nikitin; Col. Leonid Gavrilovich Sergeev; Maj. Gen. Fyodor Nazarovich Parkhomenko; Col. Pavel Andreevich Potapov; Maj. Gen. Dmitrii Akimovich Lukyanov; Col. Efrem Ignatevich Dolgov

The 128th Rifle Division was first formed as an infantry division of the Red Army on August 19, 1939, in the Urals Military District, based on the shtat (table of organization and equipment) of the following month. It was formed mostly of personnel of Uzbek nationality and was known as an "Uzbek" division until 1941. After seeing brief service in the war against Finland in early 1940 as part of 8th Army it remained in the Leningrad area and then the occupied Baltic states, being assigned to 11th Army in Lithuania in early 1941. In the opening hours of the German invasion it was outflanked to the north and south by panzer formations. It managed to evade or break out of encirclement over the following weeks, making its way to the east toward Leningrad, briefly becoming part of 27th Army, and then 48th Army to the north of Lake Ilmen. This Army was driven aside by German motorized forces in late August and early September, leading to the encirclement of the city, with the 128th outside the pocket south of Lake Ladoga. It was soon reassigned to the new 54th Army. It played a minor role in the first attempt to recapture Sinyavino in October, and over the following months fought to maintain its positions along the Volkhov River, moving to 8th Army in January 1942 and then, with that Army, to Volkhov Front in June. Under these commands it attacked again toward Sinyavino in late August but was halted after initial gains, after which the penetration was cut off and the division was forced to escape with heavy losses. After moving to 2nd Shock Army it returned to 8th Army, then back to 2nd Shock prior to the offensive in January 1943 which partially broke the blockade. During September, as part of 67th Army, back in Leningrad Front, it played a marginal role in the fighting that finally took Sinyavino. The front stabilized over the following months and the 128th returned to 2nd Shock in order to stage out of the Oranienbaum Bridgehead at the start of the offensive that drove Army Group North from the gates of Leningrad in January 1944, but was soon reassigned to 42nd Army in the same Front for the advance toward the Panther Line, where it stalled for several months. In July it took part in the fighting for the city of Pskov and won its name as a battle honor. Following this victory it began advancing into Estonia before being removed to the Reserve of the Supreme High Command where it was rebuilt as it moved into Poland to join the 21st Army in 1st Ukrainian Front. Early in the offensive into Silesia in January 1945 the division was recognized for its role in taking the city of Hindenburg with the Order of the Red Banner. During March it took part in the Upper Silesian Offensive and three of its regiments were recognized with decorations. In the very last days of the war it was marching on Prague, and by July it was disbanded.

== Formation ==
The division was formed in Sverdlovsk Oblast in the Urals Military District on August 19, 1939, based on a cadre from the 65th Rifle Division's 311th Rifle Regiment. Kombrig Aleksandr Semyonovich Zotov, who had been serving as deputy commander of the 97th Rifle Division, was given command the same day; he would have his rank modernized to that of major general on June 4, 1940. The majority of the division's recruits were from Uzbekistan and was referred to as an "Uzbek" division prior to 1941. It saw limited service in February/March 1940 during the last stages of the Winter War against Finland as part of 14th Rifle Corps on the Loimola axis. At the time of the German invasion on June 22, 1941, the division was under direct command of 11th Army. Its order of battle was as follows:

- 374th Rifle Regiment
- 533rd Rifle Regiment
- 741st Rifle Regiment
- 292nd Artillery Regiment
- 481st Howitzer Artillery Regiment (until September 11, 1941)
- 251st Antitank Battalion
- 349th Antiaircraft Battery (later 260th Battalion, until February 1, 1943)
- 391st Mortar Battalion (from November 2, 1941, until November 5, 1942)
- 119th Reconnaissance Company (later 119th Battalion)
- 148th Sapper Battalion
- 212th Signal Battalion (later 212th Signal Company)
- 132nd Medical/Sanitation Battalion
- 267th Chemical Defense (Anti-gas) Company (later 207th)
- 215th Motor Transport Company (later 76th Battalion)
- 332nd Field Bakery (later 116th Motorized Field Bakery)
- 492nd Divisional Veterinary Hospital
- 48687th Field Postal Station (later 54th)
- 5473rd Field Office of the State Bank (later 655th)

At this time it was the extreme left flank division of the Baltic Special Military District from the Lithuania/Belarus border to a point northwest of Seirijai, where it tied in to the 126th Rifle Division. General Zotov had his headquarters in a forest 5km west of that place, with elements of the division spread along the border from Lazdijai to Simnas. The forward detachment along the border consisted of the 741st Regiment and the 2nd Battalion of the 374th Regiment; the 292nd Artillery covered the approaches to Seirijai.

The District commander, Col. Gen. F. I. Kuznetsov, had disregarded the instructions of the NKO and General Staff to avoid any action that might be taken as a provocation. On June 15, alarmed by intelligence reports of the German buildup, issued orders to increase force readiness along the frontier. Without directly mentioning the buildup he stated, "Today, as never before, we must be fully combat ready. Many commanders do not understand this. But all must firmly and clearly understand that at any moment we must be ready to fulfill any combat mission." After receiving further intelligence two days later Kuznetsov ordered his forces to full military readiness on June 18. While his actions were brave in going against orders from the top and militarily correct, it's unlikely that they made any real difference when the war began.

== Baltic Operation ==
The boundary between the Baltic and Western Special Military Districts (soon redesignated as Northwestern and Western Fronts) was known to German intelligence and was an obvious place for 12th Panzer Division of 3rd Panzer Group's LVII Motorized Corps to break through the Soviet front. The XXXIX Motorized Corps was deployed to penetrate at the junction of the 128th and 126th Divisions. Altogether the 3rd Panzer Group deployed over 600 tanks in a formation that was intended to guard against counterattacks by tanks and infantry. Gen. H. Hoth later wrote:

The commanding officers of the 39th Panzer Corps sent both tank regiments and part of the 20th Motorized Division along the Suwałki–Kalvaria motorway with the aim of capturing heights south of Kalvaria, which had important tactical value. Those forces were excessive, and such an outlay was not justifying itself.

Individual battalions at the border were pushed aside and larger units were bypassed, leaving the 128th outflanked north and south. 7th Panzer Division was close to Kalvaria by 0800 hours and aiming for the bridges over the Neman River at Alytus. While the panzers swept to the rear the division faced the elements of the 5th and 35th Infantry Divisions of V Army Corps. By the evening 11th Army had largely been scattered, and Kuznetsov reported to Moscow that the 128th had been encircled, with no accurate information on its situation available.

In the event, General Zotov managed to reorganize his troops so that most of them were able to "slide away" to the east behind the armored spearheads. As of July 10 it was assigned to the 24th Rifle Corps of 27th Army, still in Northwestern Front. On July 26 Zotov was taken prisoner near Minsk after being wounded in the arm. He was initially sent to a prison camp at Suwałki, but spent most of the war in Sachsenhausen concentration camp. Upon his release in May 1945 he was arrested, investigated, and cleared of any wrongdoing in December, and from 1947 until his retirement in 1954 he served as head of the military department of the Saratovsk Law Institute. Col. Fyodor Ivanovich Komarov, Zotov's chief of staff, took over the scattered remnants of the 128th and led them past Kaunas toward Daugavpils. As of August 1 it was assigned to 16th Rifle Corps, which made up the largest part of the Novgorod Operational Group.

=== Defense of Leningrad ===
On August 7 the 48th Army was formed in Northwestern Front, which consisted of the 1st People's Militia (DNO) Division, the 70th, 128th, and 237th Rifle Divisions (16th Corps was disbanded at around this time), 1st Mountain Rifle Brigade and 21st Tank Division. The Army was responsible for defending the Front's left flank north of Lake Ilmen. The German I and XXVIII Army Corps resumed the advance toward Leningrad on August 10 along the Novgorod axis. The two Corps tore through the partially prepared defenses of 48th Army along the Mshaga River and captured Shimsk late on August 12. I Corps captured Novgorod on August 16 and then Chudovo on August 20, cutting the railroad from Leningrad to Moscow. By now the Army was a wreck, with only 6,235 personnel, 5,043 rifles and 31 artillery pieces remaining.

After taking Lyuban on August 25, the 18th and 20th Motorized Divisions of XXXIX Corps advanced simultaneously toward Volkhov, Kirishi, and Mga against 48th Army, attempting to cut the rail line south of Lake Ladoga and link up with Finnish forces east of there. The Army was forced out of Mga, but its commander, Lt. Gen. S. D. Akimov, received orders from the Front to retake it by September 6 at all costs. He had the hastily refitted 128th and 311th Rifle Divisions, 1st Mountain Rifle Brigade, plus an NKVD Rifle Division, available for the task. Mga was retaken on August 30 while the NKVD Division pushed back the attacks of the 122nd Infantry Division at Ivanovskoe and the mouth of the Mga River. The fighting see-sawed the next day as 20th Motorized retook Mga Station, and over the following week drove north against the NKVD and 1st Mountain Brigade. With reinforcements from 12th Panzer it took Sinyavino on September 7, and Shlisselburg the next day, completing the blockade of Leningrad.

This advance had driven the 128th off to the northeast, taking up positions along the Chernaya River. 48th Army was disbanded, with its forces assigned to the new 54th Army which was assembling at Volkhov under command of Lt. Gen. M. S. Khozin. In this crisis, Army Gen. G. K. Zhukov was sent to take command of Leningrad Front. By September 24 the division had managed to push westward some 8km against the overextended 20th Motorized. After September 30 the front north and south of the city essentially solidified until January 1943. It was reported on October 1 that the division had a strength of 2,145 personnel, with just 12 machine guns of all types, eight mortars, and no artillery at all.

== Siege of Leningrad ==
On October 12, and again on October 14, the STAVKA ordered Zhukov to plan and carry out a two-pronged operation, beginning on October 20, to break the Shlisselburg corridor, retake Sinyavino, and reopen land communications with the city.

=== First Sinyavino Offensive ===
Inside the siege lines the 55th Army had been organized and was now redesignated as the Eastern Sector Operational Group (ESOG) of five rifle divisions, two tank brigades and a regiment, and supporting artillery, all under Maj. Gen. I. I. Fedyuninskii, who would take over Front command from Zhukov when the latter returned to Moscow on October 11. Khozin was to penetrate the defenses on a sector from Workers Settlement No. 8 and Tortolovo on the Volkhov–Leningrad line, take Sinyavino, and link up with the ESOG. His shock group consisted of the 3rd and 4th Guards Rifle Divisions, 310th Rifle Division, two tank brigades, and a pair of artillery regiments. Two further divisions would provide flank support, while the 128th, 1st Mountain Brigade, and 21st Tank Division made local attacks or generally defended the Army's sector. Altogether the attack would deploy 71,270 men, 97 tanks (including 59 KV tanks), and 475 guns against 54,000 German troops holding fortified ground surrounded by swampy terrain and supported by 450 guns.

In the event the offensive was largely preempted when the German thrust on Tikhvin began on October 16. Despite this the STAVKA insisted on sticking to the plan. On October 23 the 54th Army recorded gains in a few places, but 4th Army was losing ground to the German offensive and Tikhvin was under threat. Khozin was ordered to move two divisions to the assistance of the garrison there, and three days later he switched commands with Fedyuninskii. The Sinyavino offensive was officially halted on October 28. During its time in 54th Army the division was partially reequipped with whatever was at hand, very much a mixed bag. By the start of December the 374th and 741st Rifle Regiments had been temporarily disbanded due to lack of personnel. The 996th Reserve Rifle Regiment was added partially to fill the gap, and the 292nd Artillery Regiment was operating with two batteries of 107mm mountain mortars and a battery of 152mm howitzers, well outside the regular shtat. On December 16 Colonel Komarov left the 128th, taking over the 131st Rifle Division within a week. He was replaced by Maj. Gen. Ivan Fyodorovich Nikitin, who had previously led the 251st Rifle Division. This officer also departed on March 11, 1942, to become deputy commander of 42nd Army, and was replaced by Col. Leonid Gavrilovich Sergeev. During January the division was reassigned to 8th Army, and in June this Army was shifted to the Volkhov Front.

=== Third Sinyavino Offensive ===
By August the STAVKA was anticipating a German summer offensive near Leningrad (which was in fact being planned) and intended to forestall it with an offensive of its own. This attack would break the siege by penetrating the land corridor east of the city between the Neva and Naziia rivers, south of Sinyavino. The "bottleneck" was heavily defended and fortified, and much of the terrain was the usual peat bogs. The 8th Army would provide the offensive shock group from the east, attempting to link up with Leningrad Front's 55th Army. The Army was under command of Maj. Gen. F. N. Starikov, and Volkhov Front was led by Army Gen. K. A. Meretskov.

Third Sinyavino Offensive. Greatest extent of Soviet advance.

When the 8th Army's attack started at 0210 hours on August 27 it had roughly a four-to-one force advantage on its 15km-wide penetration sector. The 128th was tasked with screening the shock group's right (north) flank from Workers Settlement No. 7 to Moskovskaya Dubrovka. The shock group quickly forced a break across the Chernaya River at the boundary between the 227th and 223rd Infantry Divisions. Early the next day the 19th Guards Rifle Division exploited the breakthrough, advancing 5-6km and reaching the southeastern approaches to Sinyavino by nightfall. This promising start was soon stymied as German reserves, including elements of 96th and 170th Infantry Divisions assembled at Sinyavino. The 128th and the two divisions screening to the south fought to widen the penetration with little success. On August 29 the Tiger tank made its inauspicious combat debut when four were committed south of Sinyavino Heights; two of them broke down almost immediately and a third had its engine overheat. By August 31 fierce and skillful German resistance had contained the penetration.

By September 7 the German XXVI Army Corps had begun launching counterattacks to regain lost territory. The commander of German 11th Army, Field Marshall E. von Manstein, under orders from Hitler to clear up the situation, concentrated his 24th and 170th Infantry Divisions and 12th Panzer Division to attack the Soviet penetration on September 10, but this attack collapsed almost immediately due to heavy artillery and mortar fire and extensive minefields. Cancelling his planned attacks for the next day, Manstein ordered 11th Army to neutralize the Soviet artillery and prepare another attack from north and south. The renewed counteroffensive began on September 21 at the base of the penetration near Gaitolovo and despite desperate Soviet resistance linked up on September 25, encircling the bulk of 8th and 2nd Shock Armies. Belatedly, on September 29 the STAVKA sent Meretskov an order to withdraw his forces from the pocket. During the days following the remnants of the two armies escaped, although fighting persisted until October 15 as the German forces restored their previous front. Leningrad and Volkhov Fronts had suffered 113,674 losses, with most of those falling on the latter, but the German forces had lost an unprecedented 26,000 casualties. In the course of this final fighting the 128th was transferred to 2nd Shock, but by November 1 it was back in 8th Army.

== Operation Iskra ==
On November 17 Colonel Sergeev was made head of the Front's combat training department. He would later lead the 377th and 294th Rifle Divisions. He was replaced by Maj. Gen. Fyodor Nazarovich Parkhomenko, who had been in command of the 311th Division. In December, as Volkhov Front geared up for another effort to break the siege, the 128th returned to 2nd Shock Army, under command of Lt. Gen. V. Z. Romanovskii.

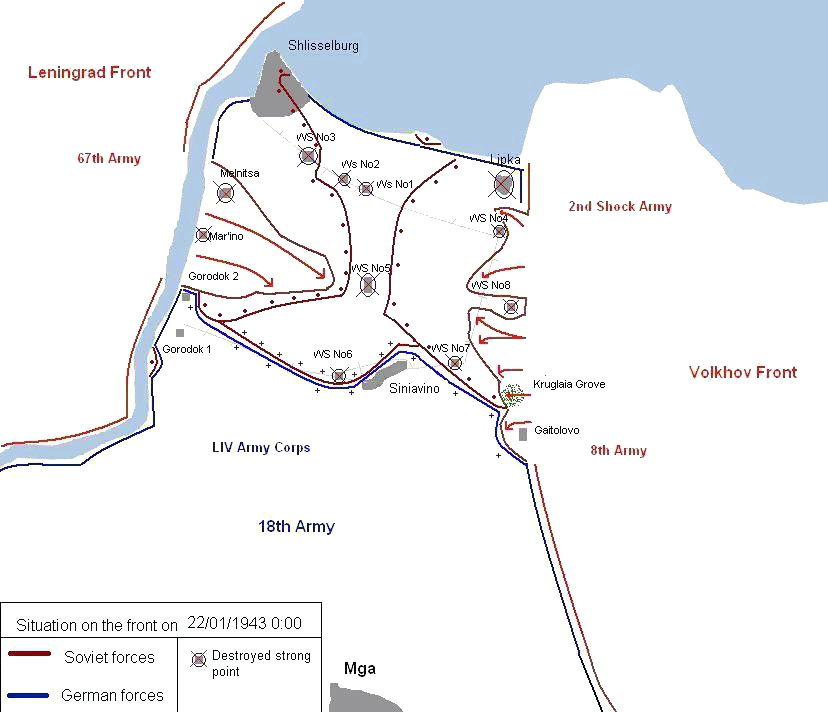
Operation Iskra

The planning for a new effort to break the German blockade, dubbed Operation Iskra ("Spark") began shortly after the previous offensive had failed. The timing of the offensive would depend on a hard freeze of the Neva, as the forces of Army Gen. L. A. Govorov's Leningrad Front lacked river-crossing equipment, especially for artillery and heavy tanks. He urged that both Fronts attack simultaneously, and the STAVKA approved his plan with only minor amendments on December 2. 2nd Shock would form the assault group for Volkhov Front, while 67th Army would do the same for Leningrad Front. Meretskov's Front was substantially reinforced with five rifle divisions, three ski brigades and four aerosan battalions. While both Fronts were prepared by January 1, on December 27 poor ice conditions on the Neva forced Govorov to request a delay; the offensive was postponed until January 10-12, 1943. 2nd Shock was to smash the German defenses on a 12km-wide sector from Lipka to Gaitolovo, destroy the German forces in the eastern part of the salient in cooperation with 8th Army, and link up with 67th Army. For this task it had 11 rifle divisions, several brigades (including four of tanks), and a total of 37 artillery and mortar regiments.

The offensive began at 0930 hours on January 12 with a 140-minute artillery preparation on the 2nd Shock Army's front. All regimental and divisional artillery was mounted on skis or sleighs to improve mobility. Romanovskii placed the bulk of his armor on the shock group's left flank to attack Sinyavino swiftly, leaving his center divisions with little tank support. The 128th was on the Army's north flank south of Lake Ladoga, facing Workers Settlement No. 4 and the village of Lipka. 14th Air Army also struck German positions around Workers Settlements Nos. 4, 5, and 7, plus Sinyavino. When the attack went in at 1135 the division penetrated the first trench line but was brought to a halt south of Lipka by heavy fire from 2nd Battalion, 287th Infantry Regiment, of the 96th Infantry Division. This unit occupied snow-covered bunkers in a cemetery on a hill facing the 128th's right flank. In after-action reports Parkhomenko was critiqued for failure to maneuver, make use of heavy weapons and concentrated fire, and poor cooperation with supporting armor.

With the advance reduced to a snail's pace by January 14 Romanovskii, who had dissipated much of his strength over a broad front, began to commit his second echelon forces. By late on January 17 the German front was fragmented and the two Fronts were only 1.5-2km apart. As the battle reached its crescendo the next afternoon the 128th and 372nd Rifle Divisions jointly captured Lipka and cleared the forests northeast of Workers Settlement No. 1. The 372nd had earlier linked up with lead elements of 67th Army's 123rd Rifle Division in this area, formally breaking the siege. German forces trapped to the north were forced to run a gauntlet to reach Sinyavino. Beginning on January 20 the two Armies launched attack after attack against that place. By now the victorious forces were exhausted, having suffered 115,082 casualties, and Sinyavino and its heights remained in German hands. While land communications with Leningrad had been restored, German artillery would continue to threaten these for another year. The offensive was halted on January 31. By this time the 128th had come under direct Front command, and on February 18 General Parkhomenko was relieved of his command; in November he would take over the 237th Rifle Division. He was replaced by Col. Pavel Andreevich Potapov, who had led the 191st Rifle Division during Iskra. At about the same time the division returned to 2nd Shock.

=== Mga (Sixth Sinyavino) Offensive ===
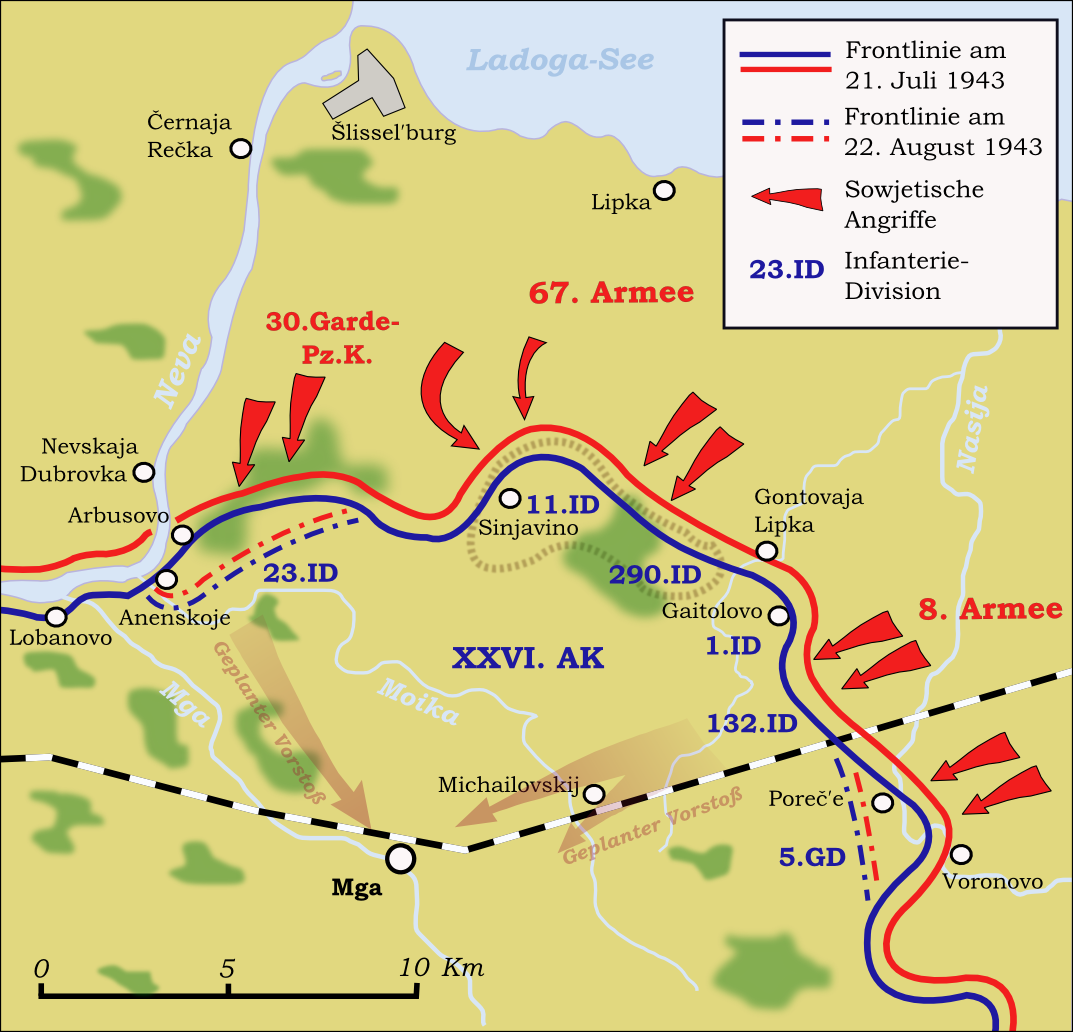
Mga (Fifth and Sixth Sinyavino) Offensive

In April 2nd Shock was transferred to Leningrad Front, and in June the 128th became part of 43rd Rifle Corps, along with the 11th and 314th Rifle Divisions. The next month it was moved with its Corps to 67th Army. The Army was located in the western half of the land corridor to the city that had been opened during Iskra. On July 22 the 67th and 55th Armies, plus the 8th Army of Volkhov Front, had begun the Fifth Sinyavino Offensive in a renewed effort to take that place as well as Mga. The fighting continued until August 22, although the two sides had come to a standstill by August 4, with the Sinyavino Heights still in German hands and Mga still well in the rear.

The offensive was renewed on September 15. The capture of the Heights was considered crucial to both sides as its possession allowed German artillery observation over the supply lines through the corridor. As in the previous effort, the attack would be led by the 30th Guards Rifle Corps, which was attached to 67th Army. This Corps would be supported on its left by a shock group consisting of the 43rd and 123rd Divisions, while its right flank support shock group included the 120th, 124th, and 196th Divisions. The German 18th Army was currently defending the sector from the Neva River through Sinyavino to Gaitolovo with its XXVI Army Corps of seven divisions. Sinyavino and its Heights were being held by the 11th and 290th Infantry Divisions. 43rd Corps was held in second echelon.

Based on past experience, the Front commander, General Govorov, and the Army commander, Lt. Gen. M. P. Dukhanov, both recognized that changes had to be made to the pattern of artillery support:

The battle that had occurred here previously demonstrated that, for success in the attack, it was insufficient to suppress and destroy the enemy firing points and achieve fire superiority. [Instead] it was necessary to destroy the trenches and communications trenches thoroughly to deprive the enemy of the capability for exploiting them for maneuver. One had to change the method of artillery preparation, which had become stereotypical. Usually the enemy soldiers waited through it [the preparation] in "foxes' lairs" and other shelters, and, when the fire shifted into the depth of the defense, they hurried back to the forward trenches in order to greet the attackers with organized fires.

What Govorov and his chief of artillery ordered was that the two hitherto distinct phases of the so-called artillery offensive–the artillery preparation and fires in support of the attack–be combined into a single phase. What resulted was fire that "crept" into the depth of the defense as the infantry advanced, preventing detection of the interval between phases as the preparation proceeded.

The artillery assault worked as planned, and in a 30-minute struggle the 30th Guards Corps seized the Heights that had cost so many lives. Despite this success, the flanking divisions bogged down after three days of heavy fighting and the STAVKA allowed Govorov to halt the offensive on September 18; 43rd Corps was not committed. Quick reaction by German tactical reserves contained the drive before it could penetrate toward Mga in the lowlands to the south. By September 25 a period of relative calm descended over the front south of Leningrad.

== Leningrad-Novgorod Offensive ==
In October the 128th left 43rd Corps, coming under direct command of 67th Army. During December it came under command of 118th Rifle Corps, but before the start of the winter offensive it was first transferred to 108th Rifle Corps in 42nd Army, then at the last minute with its Corps to 2nd Shock Army inside the Oranienbaum Bridgehead, where it took up the second echelon.

=== Krasnoye Selo-Ropsha Offensive ===
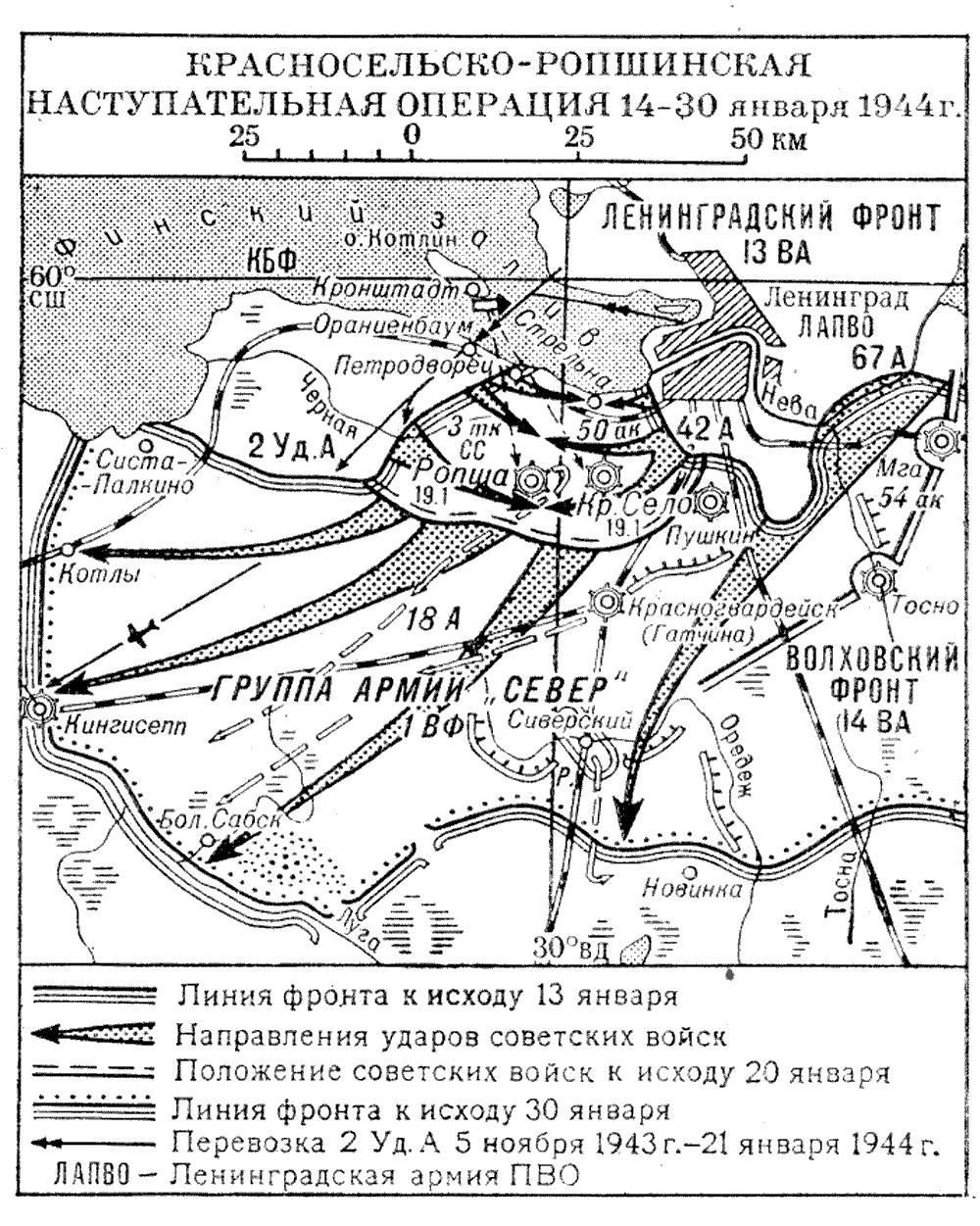
Soviet-era map of the offensive

Govorov planned to have 2nd Shock and 42nd Armies break through the German lines they faced and then link up at Ropsha, cutting off the German forces between that place and the Gulf of Finland. This would also reestablish land communications with Oranienbaum. 2nd Shock was now led by General Fediuninskii. The offensive began at dawn on January 14, 1944, with a massive artillery preparation of 104,000 shells over 65 minutes against the positions of the 9th and 10th Luftwaffe Field Divisions. Despite extensive fortifications built since 1941 the massed Soviet riflemen, assisted by tanks, soon overcame the forward defenses and by day's end had gained up to 3km on a 10km-wide front. The advance continued overnight as the lead divisions pushed forward another 4km, and the next day shattered what was left of 10th Luftwaffe Division. 2nd Shock was finally halted by heavy fire west of Ropsha. 42nd Army also made good progress from its side on the first two days. Colonel Potapov was transferred to command of the 189th Rifle Division, being briefly replaced by Col. Pavel Karpovich Loskutov until that officer was wounded on March 2. Maj. Gen. Dmitrii Akimovich Lukyanov, who had previously led the 191st and 2nd Rifle Divisions, then took command.

January 16 saw the battle develop with greater fury and during its course Fediuninskii's forces completed the penetration of the main defensive belt. He now formed a small mobile group from a tank brigade, a self-propelled artillery regiment, a battalion of infantry in trucks, an artillery battalion, and other units with orders to take Ropsha at all cost. Counterattacks brought this to a halt halfway to the objective. While the German High Command debated the retreat of 18th Army the entire 2nd Shock Army surged ahead on January 18 as the 128th and 90th Rifle Divisions of 108th Corps were committed; 122nd Rifle Corps took Ropsha the next day. The same day at 2100 hours one regiment of the 168th Rifle Division linked up with 42nd Army's mobile group just south of the town. The 168th now joined 108th Corps. On the morning of January 20 the two Armies met all along their fronts, closing the door behind the German grouping to the north.

The next objective, apart from mopping up the encircled German forces, was to advance in the direction of Luga. This would involve 42nd Army capturing Krasnogvardeisk and 2nd Shock protecting its right flank. By January 24 the Army was advancing along the Krasnogvardeisk–Kingisepp railroad, but only made modest gains against stiffening resistance. Govorov now regrouped his forces. Among other moves the 108th Corps was made part of 42nd Army. During the next two days the 108th and 122nd Corps jointly captured Elizavetino. Unbeknown to Hitler, the chief of staff of Army Group North ordered the overdue withdrawal to begin overnight on January 27/28. At about this time the 168th left the Corps, being replaced by the 196th Division. 42nd Army continued its advance over the next few days against dwindling resistance and captured the important German supply base at Volosovo. Its spearheads reached the Luga River on January 30 and captured several bridgeheads. By this time German 18th Army's left flank and center were in full retreat.

=== To the Panther Line ===
On February 7 the Army fought a meeting engagement with elements of Army Group North attempting to take up positions for a counterattack southwest of Luga and east of Lake Peipus. The Army advanced to the south in a single echelon from west of the Plyussa River to the east bank of the lake. 116th and 123rd Corps regrouped during February 6–8 and prepared to assault southeastward toward the Luga–Pskov railroad but their advance the next day ran into the German counterattack force, most of which had not yet reached its designated positions. Later, on February 10 the 12th Panzer Division began a planned counterattack which ran directly into the 196th and 128th Divisions and 168th Division of 123rd Rifle Corps, which were attempting to encircle German forces defending Iamm Station from the east. Although the panzers managed to halt the 128th, they were themselves halted, which brought Army Group North's overall counterstrike to a conclusion.

With the failure of this attack, 18th Army was ordered to abandon Luga, which took place on February 12. The Army was now directed to commence a general withdrawal to the Panther Line, which was to be complete by March 1. Col. Gen. I. I. Maslennikov, in command of 42nd Army, left part of his forces to guard his flank on the east shore of the lake while the 108th and 123rd Corps attacked toward Pskov to the south, and the 116th Rifle Corps toward Plyussa and Strugi Krasnye. This led to a 40km-wide gap developing between these thrusts as the XXVI Army Corps defended along the upper Lochkina River. The 128th and 90th Divisions, backed by the 5th Ski Brigade, established a bridgehead across the gap between Lake Peipus and Lake Chud, but counterattacks by L Army Corps forced it to be abandoned on February 16. A further withdrawal from Lake Pirissar was forced on February 24. By the end of the month many of the Front's rifle divisions had been reduced by 2,500 to 3,500 men each. On March 2, Govorov ordered his 42nd and 67th Armies to "liberate Pskov and Ostrov no later than 10 March and then force the Velikaia River." Sources differ as to the length of this fighting, which may have continued into early April, but the defenses of the Panther Line were not significantly breached.

== Into the Baltic States ==
In March the 128th was moved back to the 118th Corps, but during April 42nd Army was reassigned to 3rd Baltic Front and the 128th returned to the revived 14th Corps. In June it came under direct Army control, and just before the start of the summer offensive it returned to 67th Army, still in 3rd Baltic, as part of 119th Rifle Corps, along with the 44th and 326th Rifle Divisions.

=== Pskov-Ostrov Offensive ===
By late June, after the start of Operation Bagration, as 1st Baltic Front began its drive into the Baltic states, the 128th was still located due east of Pskov. 2nd and 3rd Baltic Fronts were initially tasked with pinning Army Group North in place; they went on the offensive on July 8. The division played a leading role in the grinding battle for the city and won its name as an honorific:

PSKOV - ...128th Rifle Division (Major General Lukyanov, Dmitrii Akimovich)... By order of the Supreme High Command of 23 July 1944 and a commendation in Moscow, the troops who participated in the battles for the liberation of Pskov are given a salute of 20 artillery salvoes from 224 guns.

In addition, the 374th Rifle Regiment was awarded the Order of the Red Banner.

==== Tartu offensive ====
By the start of the second week of August the division was still to the south Pskov, widening the breach in the Panther Line. On August 19 General Lukyanov was made deputy commander of 122nd Corps and briefly led the 189th Rifle Division. He was replaced by Col. Efrem Ignatevich Dolgov, who would lead the 128th until it was disbanded. During the month it left 67th Army and rejoined 118th Corps, which formed part of the Front's Group of Forces of the Northern Sector. It would remain in this Corps for nearly the duration of the war. By mid-September it was in the vicinity of Elva in Estonia, heading toward Tartu, which had been taken on August 25. Later in September the 118th Corps was moved to the Reserve of the Supreme High Command for redeployment to the southwest.

== Into Germany and Czechoslovakia ==
In December the Corps finally left the Reserve and joined 21st Army, commanded by Col. Gen. D. N. Gusev, which was transferred to 1st Ukrainian Front; the division would remain under these commands for the duration. At this time the 118th Corps consisted of the 128th, 282nd, and 291st Rifle Divisions. At the start of the Vistula-Oder Offensive on January 12, 1945, the 21st Army was in the Front's reserve and did not see combat until the 17th, when it was committed to the fighting for the Silesian industrial area. By January 28 this area had been cleared and 118th Corps was pulled back to the Army's second echelon in the area northwest of Katowice and partly began moving toward the Oder River where the Army's 117th Rifle Corps was fighting for a bridgehead south of Oppeln. On February 19 the division would be awarded the Order of the Red Banner for its role in the capture of the city of Hindenburg on January 26.

During the first days of February, as the division fought for the city of Gleiwitz and to establish a bridgehead over the Oder, Starshina Taimbet Komekbaev of the 5th Company of the 533rd Rifle Regiment distinguished himself sufficiently to be made a Hero of the Soviet Union. He was reported as being one of the first Soviet soldiers into the city, killing a sniper in the process. On February 6 he helped force the Oder at Eyhirind, before taking part in the fighting for Brzeg, and by February 8 he was credited with 103 German soldiers killed and 12 captured. On April 10 he would receive his Gold Star, at 49 the oldest Kazakh soldier of the RKKA to do so. After participating in the Moscow Victory Parade he was discharged and returned to his native town of Josaly where he worked in the coal industry. He died in February 1987, aged over 90 years. In recognition of its success in the river crossing the 533rd was given the battle honor "Oder", while on February 19 the 741st Rifle Regiment would receive the Order of Alexander Nevsky for its part in the battle for Gleiwitz.

The next stage of the offensive would be the encirclement of Breslau by the 21st, 5th Guards, and 6th Armies. A regrouping took place from February 8-12 which added the 291st Division to 55th Corps and left the Corps holding an 80km-wide front from Oppeln to Wansen; this allowed the 117th and 118th Corps to concentrate as a shock group. The latter, now with the 286th Rifle Division from 59th Army, was focused on an 8km-wide sector with two divisions in first echelon and the other in second. The offensive was renewed on February 13 and gained up to 10km by the end of February 15 but thereafter slowed significantly due to the presence of significant defensive forces in the area southwest of Breslau. 21st Army would require a break to restore its offensive capabilities. At least some of the Front's rifle divisions by now were reduced to roughly 3,000 personnel.

=== Upper Silesian Offensive ===
At the beginning of March there was still a large German grouping holding a salient stretching eastward nearly to Oppeln and this was the target for a new drive by 21st, 59th, 60th, 5th Guards Armies, plus 4th Tank Army. 21st Army formed a shock group which was to attack in the direction of Priborn with the objective of reaching Münsterberg by the end of the second day, in cooperation with the 34th Guards Rifle and the 4th Guards Tank Corps. Gusev would commit eight rifle divisions, five of which would be in the first echelon. The inner flanks of 118th and 117th Corps were concentrated on a 6km-wide sector from the Grottkau–Neisse railroad to Mertzdorf. The commander of 118th Corps, Maj. Gen. A. F. Naumov, placed the 128th and 282nd Divisions in first echelon, with the 286th in second. The objective for the first day, in co-operation with 4th Tank Army's 6th Mechanized Corps, was a line from Deutsch Jagel to Breitenfeld.

21st Army's part in the offensive began at 0600 hours on March 15 with an attack by its forward battalions, followed by the main forces at 1020. The 128th's battalion was directed toward Beatenhof. The forward battalions followed on the heels of a 10-minute artillery onslaught and units of the 117th and 118th Corps quickly seized their first objectives; these attacks were so successful that General Gusev ordered the artillery preparation for the main forces shortened to 40 minutes, but this proved a mistake and caused the advance to slow later in the day. Overnight the German forces facing 21st and 4th Tank Armies were reinforced by the 10th Panzergrenadier and 19th Panzer Divisions and during March 16 the Soviet Armies had to repel numerous counterattacks. Despite this, elements of 118th Corps managed to advance up to 10km during the day.

The next day the 117th Corps' 120th Rifle Division, along with 10th Tank Corps, reached the Neisse in the Rothaus–Mansdorf area, completing the penetration of the German defenses, and on March 18 the 117th and 55th Corps advanced another 15km, capturing 55 towns and villages, and finally linking up with 59th Army near Neustadt, completing the encirclement. Over the next two days the pocket would be eliminated, while 118th Corps continued attacking with 6th Mechanized toward the line Münsterberg–Alt Patschkau–Kalkau. Attempts by the 20th Panzer, Hermann Göring Panzer, 10th Panzergrenadier, and 45th Infantry Divisions from Ottmachau to break through to the encirclement were beaten off by 118th Corps and 6th Mechanized. By the night of March 19/20 two divisions had been transferred to the Steinau area to reinforce 4th Guards Tanks.

With the conclusion of the encirclement battle the 21st and 4th Guards Tanks were ordered to continue advancing westward in the direction of the town of Neisse. Naumov was ordered to advance on a 20km-wide front and cover 10-20km to reach a line from Munsterberg to Ottmachauer Pond to outside Neisse, consolidate, and prepare to repel any infantry or armor attacks. Due to shortages of ammunition the attack began with just 10 minutes of artillery preparation. The attack began at 0810 hours on March 23, but failed, largely due to the lack of support. Meanwhile, the better-supported 117th and 55th Corps went ahead successfully, and the town was taken late the next day. On March 27, the Front command ordered Gusev to cease offensive operations and consolidate along the east bank of the Bila River. On April 26 the 533rd Rifle and 292nd Artillery Regiments would each receive the Order of Alexander Nevsky for their roles in the fighting for Neisse.

21st Army began advancing toward Prague on May 7 and the 128th reached as far as Jaroměř three days later when the fighting ended.

== Postwar ==
When the shooting stopped the men and women of the division shared the full title of 128th Rifle, Pskov, Order of the Red Banner Division. (Russian: 128-я Псковская Краснознамённая стрелковая дивизия.) According to STAVKA Order No. 11096 of May 29, part 8, 118th Corps and the 128th were listed as among those to be "disbanded in place". In accordance to this directive the division was disbanded in July.
