= 189th Rifle Division =

189th Rifle Division (March 14, 1941 - September 19, 1941) 189th Rifle Division (September 23, 1941 - 1946)
- Active: 1941–1946
- Country: Soviet Union
- Branch: Red Army
- Type: Infantry
- Size: Division
- Engagements: Operation Barbarossa; Battle of Uman; Leningrad strategic defensive Siege of Leningrad; Operation Iskra; Leningrad–Novgorod offensive Krasnoye Selo–Ropsha offensive Kingisepp–Gdov offensive Battle of Narva (1944); Baltic offensive Tartu offensive Riga offensive (1944)
- Decorations: Order of the Red Banner (2nd formation)
- Battle honours: Kingisepp (2nd formation)

Commanders
- Notable commanders: Kombrig Aleksandr Semyonovich Chichkanov; Col. Konstantin Akimovich Antonov; Col. Aleksandr Dmitrievich Kornilov; Col. Pavel Karpovich Loskutov; Maj. Gen. Pavel Andreevich Potapov; Col. Nikolai Vasilevich Simonov

The 189th Rifle Division was an infantry division of the Red Army, originally formed as part of the prewar buildup of forces, based on the shtat (table of organization and equipment) of September 13, 1939. It began forming just months before the German invasion in the Kiev Special Military District, where it was soon assigned to the 55th Rifle Corps in the reserves of Southwestern Front. It soon left this Corps, first coming under direct command of Southern Front, and then joining 17th Rifle Corps in 18th Army. As the retreat continued through western Ukraine in July the 189th was again reassigned, now to the ill-fated 6th Army. In early August it was encircled near Uman and destroyed.

A second 189th was created on September 23, with the redesignation of the 6th Leningrad Militia Division in 42nd Army. It would mostly remain in this Army into early 1944, defending the southern suburbs of Leningrad on a heavily fortified and largely static front. Beginning of January 15 it took part in the breakthrough of the thick defenses, and as Leningrad Front's forces advanced westward it was transferred to 2nd Shock Army, being awarded a battle honor at the start of February while under this command. After reaching Narva it forced a river crossing, but operations on this sector soon bogged down and the 189th remained on the defensive until early August. At this point it joined in the offensive into Estonia, winning the Order of the Red Banner for its part in the fighting for Tartu, and then being moved to 67th Army for the duration of the war. After the fall of Riga it was largely engaged in coastal watch on the east shore of the Gulf of Riga for the duration of the war. It was disbanded in early 1946.

== 1st Formation ==
The division began forming on March 14, 1941, in the Kiev Special Military District. As of June 22 it had the following order of battle:

- 864th Rifle Regiment
- 880th Rifle Regiment
- 891st Rifle Regiment
- 431st Artillery Regiment
- 433rd Howitzer Artillery Regiment
- 79th Antitank Battalion
- 89th Antiaircraft Battalion
- 269th Reconnaissance Battalion
- 366th Sapper Battalion
- 621st Signal Battalion
- 100th Medical/Sanitation Battalion
- 216th Chemical Defense (Anti-gas) Company
- 122nd Motor Transport Battalion
- 254th Motorized Field Bakery
- 727th Field Postal Station
- 536th Field Office of the State Bank

Kombrig Aleksandr Semyonovich Chichkanov took command of the division on the day it began forming. This officer had recently served as an adviser to the Mongolian People's Republic and as an instructor at the Frunze Military Academy, but for an unknown reason his rank had not been modernized. Although still far from complete on June 22, it concentrated at Shpykiv the next day. 55th Rifle Corps was in the reserves of Southwestern Front (as the Kiev District had been redesignated) and also contained the 130th and 169th Rifle Divisions. In a STAVKA directive dated June 24 the Corps was transferred to Southern Front, and by the start of July it was under command of 18th Army, although the 189th had been detached to Front reserves. As of July 10 it was part of 17th Rifle Corps, also in 18th Army.

== Battle of Uman ==
By this time, 17th Corps was falling back in front of Hungarian 8th Army Corps in the vicinity of Kamianets-Podilskyi, attempting to form a defense along the Dniestr River. As of around July 14 the Corps was located some 40km northwest of Mohyliv-Podilskyi. While the retreat continued the 189th was detached from the Corps and directed northeast in the general direction of Lypovets. In the process it was again transferred, now to 6th Army, in Southwestern Front, although as the situation deteriorated it would be moved to Southern Front. Operating under direct Army command it was assigned a sector southeast of Pohrebyshche, facing the German 68th Infantry Division by July 23.

The German encirclement operation, which would eventually trap both the 6th and 12th Armies, was now underway. The 189th, which was very deep in the pocket, had no realistic chance of escape, and by about August 11 it had been destroyed, although it was not officially removed from the Red Army order of battle until September 19.

The further career of Kombrig Chichkanov was unusual. He evaded capture, and lived behind enemy lines until March 1943. At this time he was arrested by the Soviet authorities, and would remain in prison until August 21, 1952. On this date he was finally officially condemned to a further sentence of 10 years. However, on July 23, 1953, following Stalin's death, he was released, and within weeks he had been rehabilitated and reinstated in the Soviet Army with the rank of colonel. He retired on September 29, 1959.

== 6th Leningrad Militia Division ==
This division of Narodnoe Opolcheniye formed in the period from September 4-16, 1941, based on the Worker's Battalion militia of the Oktyabirskaya and Leningradskoi Districts of Leningrad. It was under the command of Col. Konstantin Akimovich Antonov. Its rudimentary order of battle was as follows:

- 1st Militia Rifle Regiment - total 2,225 men
- 2nd Militia Rifle Regiment - total 1,794 men
- 3rd Militia Rifle Regiment - total 2,328 men
- (Militia) Artillery Regiment - total 651 men
- Sapper Battalion - total 58 men
- Signal Battalion - total 82 men
- Medical Battalion - total 55 men

On September 14 the division had 8,189 men assigned, including 654 Communist Party members and 286 Komsomols. Since Army Group North was pushing toward the last-ditch positions of 42nd Army behind Pulkovo, Army Gen. G. K. Zhukov, the commander of Leningrad's defense, ordered Antonov to occupy that defensive line by 0900 hours on September 17, threatening that if his division was not there on time he would stand the officers responsible "against the wall of the Smolny and shoot them there as traitors." Antonov and his men got there on time, and on September 23 the 6th Militia was redesignated as the 189th Rifle Division.

== Siege of Leningrad ==
Once it was redesignated the new 189th had much the same order of battle as the previous formation:

- 864th Rifle Regiment
- 880th Rifle Regiment
- 891st Rifle Regiment
- 431st Artillery Regiment
- 79th Antitank Battalion
- 269th Reconnaissance Company
- 366th Sapper Battalion
- 621st Signal Battalion (later 910th Signal Company)
- 100th Medical/Sanitation Battalion
- 216th Chemical Defense (Anti-gas) Company
- 122nd Motor Transport Company
- 353rd Field Bakery
- 277th Divisional Veterinary Hospital
- 551st Field Postal Station
- 802nd Field Office of the State Bank

Colonel Antonov remained in command. The 189th would largely remain in the lines in the Pulkovo area into January 1944, forming a linchpin of the Soviet defenses on the city's southern outskirts. As of October 1, the 42nd Army, under command of Maj. Gen. I. I. Fedyuninskii, was defending a 17km-wide sector from Ligovo to Pulkovo with five rifle divisions and two brigades, supported by the Baltic Fleet. By November 1, the division had taken up a position from the church in Pulkovo to the intersection of the Vitebskaya and Kolpinskaya railroads. It was under command of Komdiv Vasilii Grigorevich Klementov from October 18 to November 28, 1941, when he was replaced by Col. Aleksandr Dmitrievich Kornilov. This officer would remain in command until July 6, 1943.

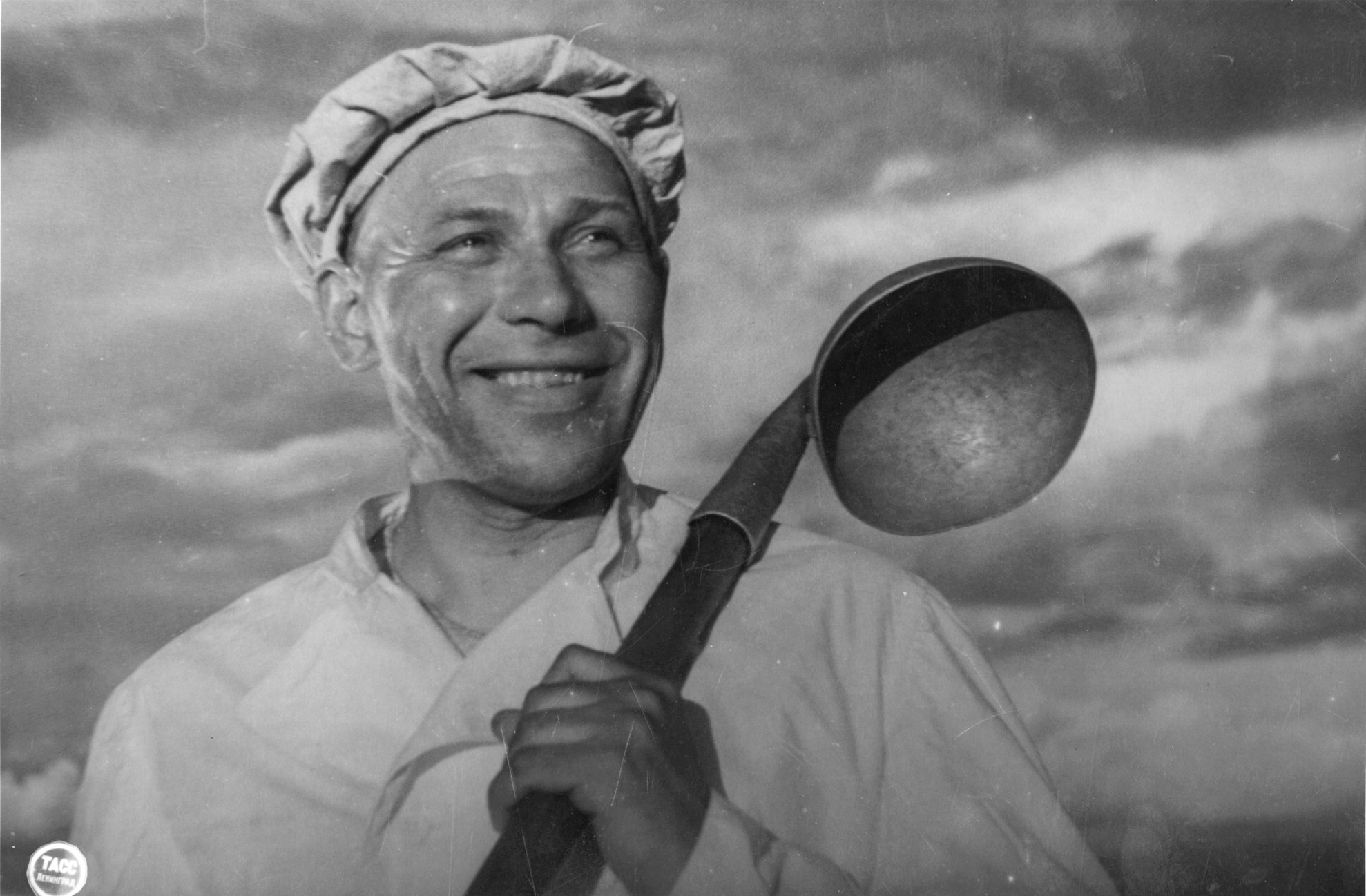
Yefreytor Sergey Andreyevich Dorogov, cook of the 891st Rifle Regiment in June 1943. Dorogov was killed in action on 16 November.

By late November 1942, the pending defeat of the German 6th Army at Stalingrad led the STAVKA to exploit the victory by breaking the siege of Leningrad. Operation Iskra (Spark) was in planning from late November with the objective of forcing a corridor across the Shlisselburg–Sinyavino bottleneck east of the city by linking up the 67th Army from the west with the 2nd Shock Army from the east. The 189th was accordingly reassigned to the 67th in January 1943. The offensive began early on January 12, with a massive two-and-a-half hour artillery preparation against positions held by elements of German 18th Army. The Soviet armies eventually linked up south of Lake Ladoga on January 18, restoring land communications to Leningrad. It is unclear if the 189th played any combat role in the fighting. It remained in 67th Army into March, and was then moved to 55th Army, before returning to its previous role and positions in 42nd Army in April.

== Leningrad-Novgorod Offensive ==
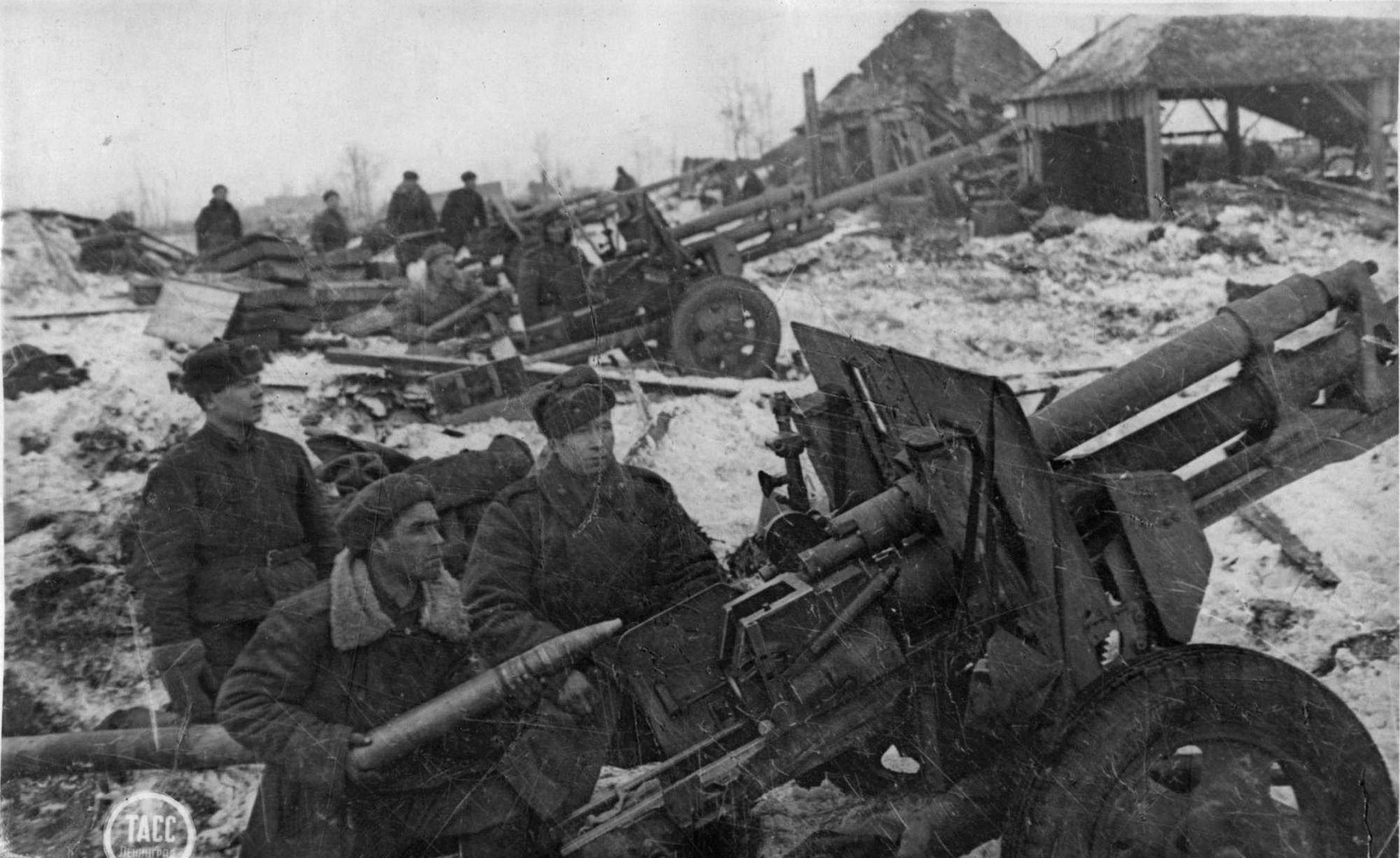
76.2 mm ZiS-3 guns from Lieutenant Ivan Zubar's platoon of the division's 431st Artillery Regiment on 17 January

Col. Pavel Karpovich Loskutov took over command of the division on July 7. It remained in 42nd Army into January 1944, at which time it joined the 109th Rifle Corps, under command of Maj. Gen. I. P. Alferov. Prior to the start of the winter offensive the division had organized its own ski battalion.

=== Krasnoye Selo-Ropsha Offensive ===
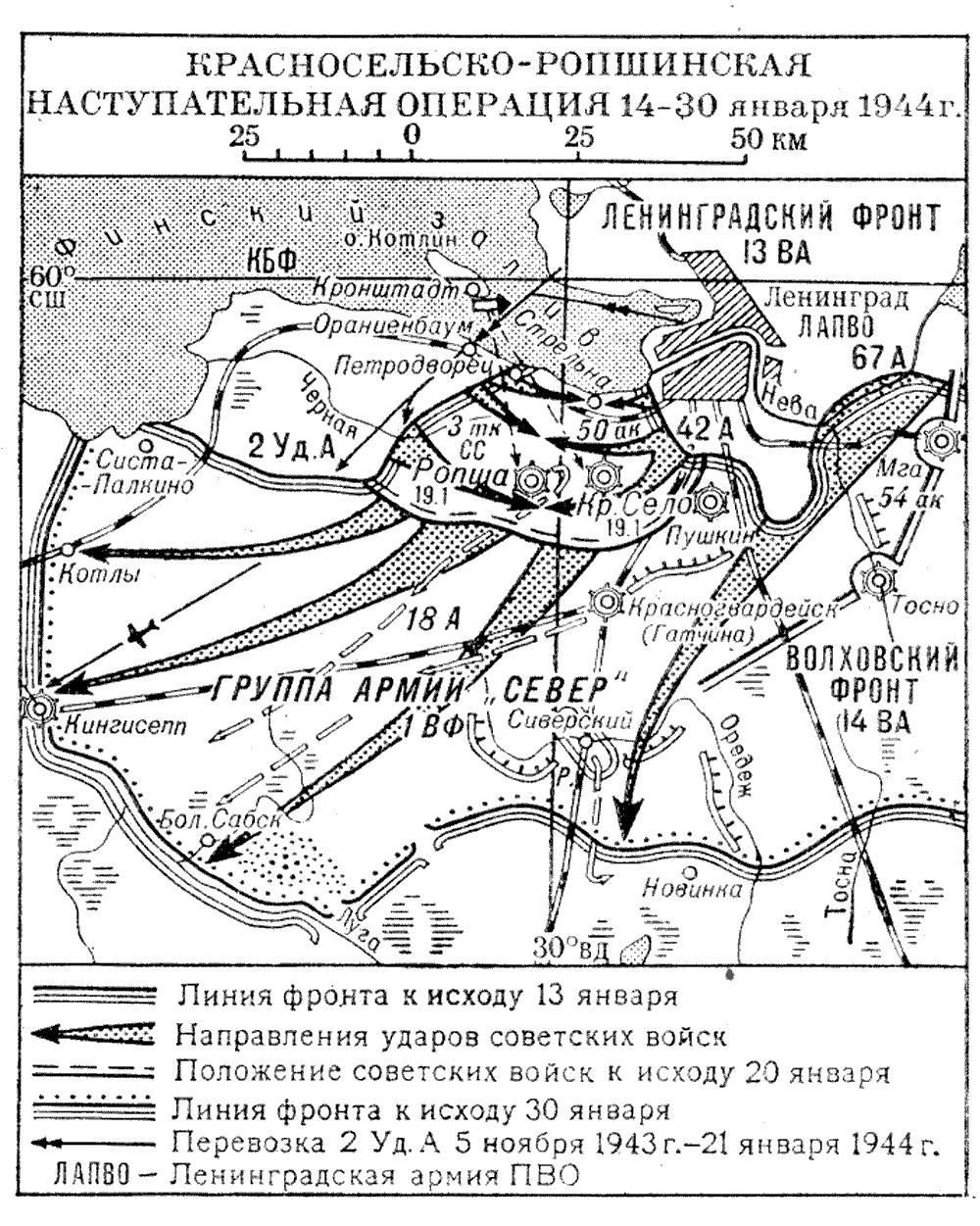
Krasnoye Selo-Ropsha Offensive. Note positions of 42nd and 2nd Shock Armies.

The offensive which finally drove Army Group away from Leningrad began with a powerful artillery preparation at 0935 hours on January 14. The heaviest fire from 42nd Army came from Pulkovo, but this was mainly intended to tie down the defenders. The next morning an even heavier bombardment, totaling of more than 220,000 shells, also began at 0935. The infantry assault stepped off at 1100 against three divisions of the German L Army Corps. On this second day the 30th Guards Rifle Corps in the center penetrated to a depth of 4km on a 5km front, but the 109th and 110th Rifle Corps on its flanks were less successful, gaining only about 1.5km, gnawing their way through heavy defenses in costly successive assaults. Colonel Loskutov was wounded, and he was replaced the next day by Col. Pavel Andreevich Potapov. This officer had previously led the 267th, 191st, and 128th Rifle Divisions and would be promoted to the rank of major general on June 3.

During January 16 the 42nd Army painfully advanced another 3-4km, mainly on the sector of the 30th Guards Corps. By the end of the next day the German forces were being threatened with encirclement as only about 18km separated 42nd Army from 2nd Shock Army attacking from the Oranienbaum Bridgehead west of Leningrad. In the evening of January 19 the two Armies linked up at Russko-Vysotskoye after capturing Krasnoye Selo and Ropsha respectively. The next day the 189th was engaged in fighting right back at the foot of Pulkovo Heights near Ligovo Station. Within days 109th Corps was transferred to 2nd Shock Army.

=== Advance on Kingisepp ===
By January 23 the westward offensive toward Kingisepp was developing across a broad front. The commander of Army Group North was desperately asking for permission to withdraw at least to the Luga Defense Line, but this was denied. During January 25-26 the 109th Corps, in cooperation with 43rd Rifle Corps, advanced up to 16km. After reaching the Kingisepp–Krasnogvardeysk railroad on January 27, 2nd Shock wheeled to the west and began pursuing XXVI Army Corps toward Kingisepp. When the town was liberated the 189th was rewarded by receiving its name as an honorific:

KINGISEPP... 189th Rifle Division (Colonel Potapov, Pavel Andreevich)... The troops that participated in the liberation of Kingisepp, by the order of the Supreme High Command on 1 February 1944, and by a commendation in Moscow, are given a salute of 12 artillery salvoes from 124 guns.

=== Battle of Narva ===
The offensive continued to develop in the direction of the city of Narva. On February 10 the 189th came under command of 30th Guards Corps. It forced a crossing of the Narva River in the region of Krivaya Luka and then took up a firm defense on the left flank of 2nd Shock. Within days it occupied temporary defenses in the Sirgala and Putki sectors. On February 18 it was shifted to the 122nd Rifle Corps of 59th Army. During its operations along the Kingisepp–Narva axis the division was credited with killing 1,200 enemy troops and wounding 2,700, while also taking 230 prisoners. At the same time it captured 96 guns and mortars, 104 machine guns, and 265 vehicles.

All this was accomplished at considerable cost. By late winter the division's front-line strength was down to about 50 percent of authorization. As an example, in March the 864th Rifle Regiment had only 1,203 personnel total, in three rifle battalions of three 60-man companies, one heavy machine gun company, one mortar company, and one platoon of antitank rifles. The regiment itself still had its support elements, with batteries of 45mm antitank and 76mm regimental guns, 120mm mortars, a company each of submachine gunners and antitank riflemen, plus reconnaissance and sapper platoons. To replace its losses, in the period from January 21 and June 14 the 189th received 10,589 enlisted personnel and non-commissioned officers as replacements. Until the latter date it remained on the defensive, In March it moved with 122nd Corps to 8th Army, where it remained into July, when it returned to 2nd Shock.

== Baltic Offensives ==
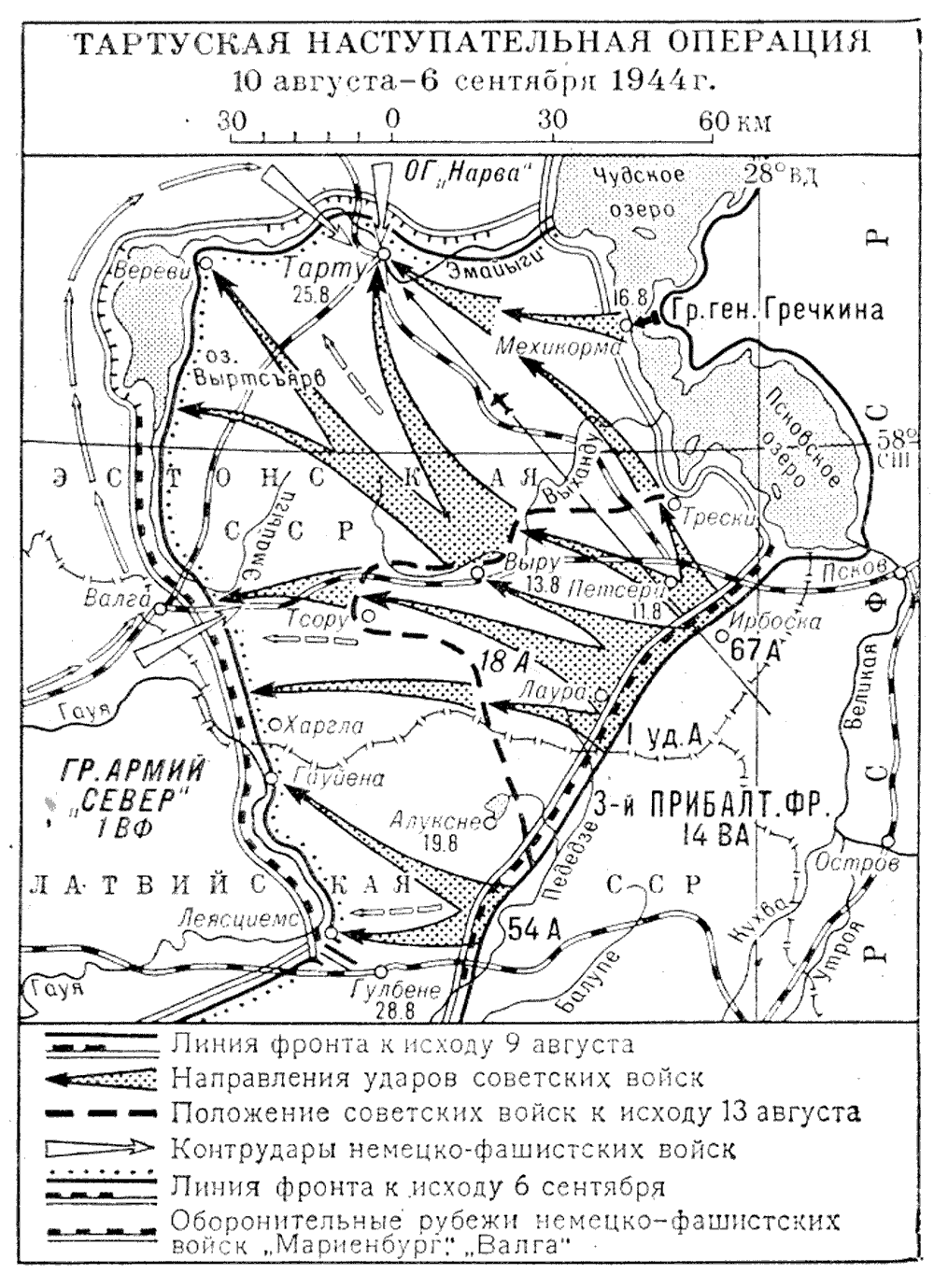
Tartu Offensive

By August 5 the 189th had been shifted to the Pskov area, prior to a new offensive to defeat the German forces occupying the Panther Line. Following the breakthrough the division entered Estonia, advancing on Tartu, when it came under counterattack from German panzer forces on August 24 west of Lake Peipus. At 0830 hours a panzer regiment attacked and penetrated the division's defenses in an effort to encircle the western part of 122nd Corps and reach the rear area of 116th Rifle Corps and then exploit to the southeast in the direction of Lake Pakedi-Iarb. In the course of an eight-hour battle the division inflicted significant losses on the German force, held its positions, and the next morning captured the town of Elva. The divisional staff played a leading role in the repulse of this counterattack. Command and control remained effective despite extraordinarily difficult conditions. The staff formed special mobile groups and detachments to combat the penetrating tanks and infantry, which often led to hand-to-hand combat. In the course of one such fight against panzers on August 24, General Potapov was killed in action. During the failed counterattack the division accounted for 20 tanks and armored personnel carriers and up to 200 German soldiers killed. Potapov would be temporarily buried at Tartu before being moved to the Preobrazhensky Cemetery in Moscow. He was replaced by Maj. Gen. Dmitrii Akimovich Lukyanov from August 25-29, who was in turn replaced by Maj. Gen. Nester Dmitrievich Kozin. Tartu was taken on August 25, and for its role the 189th would be awarded the Order of the Red Banner on September 7. Before the end of August the division, along with 122nd Corps, would be transferred to 67th Army, now in 3rd Baltic Front. The 189th would remain in this Army into the postwar.

=== Riga Offensive ===
By the second week of September the division was located near Antsla in southern Estonia, On September 24, General Kozin left the division, being replaced by Col. Nikolai Vasilevich Simonov; this officer would remain in command for the duration. At about the same time the division was transferred to the 112th Rifle Corps. By the first week of October the Army had reached the Gulf of Riga in the vicinity of Salacgrīva, Latvia, before moving south toward the Latvian capital. After Riga fell on October 13, the 3rd Baltic was disbanded and 67th Army returned to Leningrad Front, while the 189th was moved to 111th Rifle Corps, joining the 196th Rifle Division. It remained in this Corps for the duration of the war, doing coastal watch along the east coast of the Gulf in the unlikely event of the German forces trapped in the Courland Pocket making some sort of landing attempt.

== Postwar ==
When the shooting stopped, the men and women of the 189th shared the full title of 189th Rifle, Kingisepp, Order of the Red Banner Division. (Russian: 189-я стрелковая Кингисеппская Краснознамённая дивизия.) In the summer of 1945 it was transported to the Voronezh Oblast. The next year it was transferred, along with the 196th Division, to the Kiev Military District, where it was disbanded.
