= III Luftwaffe Field Corps =

German military unit

III Luftwaffe Field Corps (III. Luftwaffen-Feld-Corps)
- Active: 1942–1943
- Country: Nazi Germany
- Branch: Luftwaffe
- Type: Infantry
- Size: Corps
- Engagements: World War II; Eastern Front; Oranienbaum Bridgehead; Krasnoye Selo–Ropsha offensive

The III Luftwaffe Field Corps (German: III.Luftwaffen-Feld-Corps) was an infantry Corps of the Luftwaffe branch of the Wehrmacht that fought in World War II. Formed in early 1943 to command Luftwaffe Field Division's that were intended to serve as infantry, its personnel were largely drawn from surplus Luftwaffe ground crew. This was done as a response by Hermann Goring to the request from the Ostheer, that surplus ground & aircrew no longer needed could serve as infantry in the Wehrmacht. This he said, was to preserve their 'fervent National Socialist Values', as all Luftwaffe personnel had undergone 'Nazi' ideology Indoctrination. Something which had not been done in the Wehrmacht and it was seen by the Nazis as 'Elitist' and had class values which emanated from the days of the Kaiser.

During its existence it was under the command of Job Odebrecht and it was part of Georg Lindemann's 18th Army in Army Group North, it had under its command the 9th and 10th Luftwaffe Divisions. Posted to a sector at the Oranienbaum Bridgehead near Leningrad, it defended its frontlines for 11 months. In November 1943, responsibility for the Luftwaffe Field divisions was transferred to the Army and the Corps was disbanded.

== Commanders ==
- General der Flakartillerie Job Odebrecht

== Notes ==
Footnotes

Citations
