= Taimbet Komekbaev =

Soviet Kazakh Red Army sergeant major (1896–1987)

- Тәйімбет Көмекбаев
- Born: 1896; Zhosaly, Syr-Darya Oblast, Russian Empire
- Died: 13 February 1987 (aged 90–91); Zhosaly, Karmakshy District, Kyzylorda Region, Soviet Union
- Military career
- Allegiance: Soviet Union
- Branch: Red Army
- Service years: 1941–1945
- Rank: Sergeant major/ Starshina
- Unit: 128th Rifle Division
- Conflicts: World War II; Vistula-Oder Offensive
- Awards: Hero of the Soviet Union; Order of Lenin; Order of the Patriotic War, 1st class; Medal for Battle Merit

Taimbet Komekbaev (Kazakh: Тәйімбет Көмекбаев; 1896 – 13 February 1987) was a Kazakh starshina in World War II. He was awarded the title Hero of the Soviet Union and the Order of Lenin for his actions in the Sandomierz–Silesian Offensive.

== Early life ==
Komekbaev was born in 1896 in the village of Zhosaly (now in Kazakhstan's Kyzylorda Region). His family were peasants. Komekbaev graduated from the village school. After graduation, he worked in a coal warehouse. Komekbaev reportedly spent his spare time hunting.

== World War II ==
In November 1941, Komekbaev was drafted into the Red Army. He was sent to the Leningrad Front and served with the 128th Rifle Division. Komekbaev conducted reconnaissance missions. In early 1943, Komekbaev helped capture 14 German military personnel during a raid on their headquarters. By January 1945, he was a squad leader in the 5th Rifle Company of the 533rd Rifle Regiment in the 128th Rifle Division. During the capture of Gleiwitz between 23 and 25 January, machine gun fire from Komekbaev's squad destroyed three German machine guns. Komekbaev reportedly was among the first to break into Gleiwitz and killed a German sniper. For his actions, Komekbaev was awarded the Medal for Battle Merit on 10 February.

On 27 January, Komekbaev fought in the battle for Ruda Śląska. Komekbaev threw grenades and destroyed a German machine gun that was blocking the Soviet advance. On 6 February, Komekbaev crossed the Oder with his unit and helped create a bridgehead in the Eyhirind municipality. During the capture of Brzeg, Komekbaev repulsed five counterattacks with his machine gun, reportedly killing 18 German soldiers. On the outskirts of the city, Komekbaev found a German machine gun and killed the crew with a grenade. During the capture of Brzeg, Komekbaev reportedly killed 60 German soldiers and captured 12, who were brought to battalion headquarters. On 8 February, German forces with artillery support counterattacked, attempting to push Soviet units out of Wannsee. During these battles, Komekbaev reportedly repulsed seven counterattacks and killed 25 German soldiers. By this point, he had reportedly killed a total of 103 German soldiers. On 10 April, Komekbaev was awarded the title Hero of the Soviet Union and the Order of Lenin for his achievements. At age 49, he was the oldest Kazakh Red Army soldier to receive the award.

== Postwar ==
Komekbaev participated in the Moscow Victory Parade of 1945. He was demobilized soon after with the rank of senior sergeant. He returned to Zhosaly and worked in the coal industry. On 11 March 1985, he was awarded the Order of the Patriotic War 1st class on the 40th anniversary of the end of World War II. Komekbaev died on 13 February 1987.

== See also ==
- List of Kazakh Heroes of the Soviet Union
