= 314th Rifle Division =

314th Rifle Division (July 15, 1941 – May 29, 1945)
- Maj. Gen. Ivan Mikhailovich Aliev
- Active: 1941–1945
- Country: Soviet Union
- Branch: Red Army
- Type: Infantry
- Size: Division
- Engagements: Continuation War; Siege of Leningrad; Sinyavino Offensive (1942); Operation Iskra; Leningrad-Novgorod Offensive; Kingisepp–Gdov Offensive; Narva Offensive; Vyborg-Petrozavodsk Offensive; Vistula-Oder Offensive; Upper Silesian Offensive
- Decorations: Order of Kutuzov
- Battle honours: Kingisepp

Commanders
- Notable commanders: Maj. Gen. Afanasii Dmitrievich Shemenkov; Col. Dmitrii Ivanovich Stankevskii; Lt. Col. Aleksei Andreevich Zaitsev; Maj. Gen. Ivan Mikhailovich Aliev; Col. Mikhail Sergeevich Elshinov; Col. Pyotr Filimanovich Efimenko

The 314th Rifle Division was a standard Red Army rifle division formed on July 15, 1941 at Petropavlovsk in northern Kazakhstan, before being sent to the vicinity of Leningrad, in the 7th Separate Army east of Lake Ladoga, facing the Finnish Army in East Karelia for more than a year. In consequence the division saw relatively uneventful service on this mostly quiet front until the autumn of 1942, when it was moved south to face German Army Group North, and took a leading role in Operation Iskra, which finally drove a land corridor through to besieged Leningrad in January 1943; a year later it also served prominently in the offensive that broke the enemy siege for good. During the summer the division played a role in the offensive that drove Finland out of the war. Following this, the 314th spent a few months fighting in the Baltic States, before being reassigned southwards to 1st Ukrainian Front to take the fight into Poland and then into the German heartland in the winter and spring of 1945. It ended the war in Czechoslovakia with a distinguished record of service.

== Formation ==
The 314th began forming on July 15, 1941 at Petropavlovsk in the Central Asia Military District. It was under the command of Maj. Gen. Afanasii Dmitrievich Shemenkov from its formation until the middle of October. Its order of battle was as follows:

- 1074th Rifle Regiment
- 1076th Rifle Regiment
- 1078th Rifle Regiment
- 858th Artillery Regiment
- 202nd Reconnaissance Battalion

In August, while still forming up, the division was being moved by railway towards Leningrad, and by September 8 it was arriving in the area assigned to the 7th Army east of Lake Ladoga. On paper, the division was assigned to the 52nd Army, and then to the 54th Army when that army was first formed on September 2, but in fact it remained where it offloaded, and by the end of the month it was back in 7th Army where it remained, facing the Finnish Army, until September 1942. Command was held briefly by Col. Ivan Viktorovich Kovalev until it was handed over to Col. Dmitrii Ivanovich Stankevskii on November 28. He was in turn replaced by Lt. Col. Aleksei Andreevich Zaitsev on May 5, 1942. Zaitsev would remain in this post until August 18, a remarkably long time for an officer of his rank to hold command of a division. He was succeeded on that date by Col. Ivan Mikhailovich Aliev. Aliev would be promoted to Major General on September 25, 1943, and would remain in command until March 20, 1944.

== Breaking the Siege ==
The 314th first saw brief action on an active front near the end of the Third Siniavino Offensive. In August 1942, the 8th and 2nd Shock Armies of Volkhov Front had partially penetrated the German front east of Leningrad and advanced halfway through the neck of land south of Lake Ladoga that divided them from the city. However, the attack had been stalled by German reinforcements that had been intended for their Operation Northern Lights. In a last-ditch attempt to restart the offensive, the "completely fresh" 314th, plus the 256th Rifle Division and the 73rd Rifle Brigade, were ordered to be redeployed to the area on September 21, but this plan took a turn when German forces encircled the two Soviet armies on September 25. Thereafter the division was engaged in a rescue mission to give the pocketed units some means to escape, and while many did, the 2nd Shock was effectively destroyed for the second time that year.

During Operation Iskra, in January 1943, the 314th served as an assault division in the rebuilt 2nd Shock Army. When the offensive began it was on the Army's extreme left flank, attacking between the villages of Gaitolovo and Gontovaia Lipta, making some progress towards Siniavino, although that strongpoint continued to hold out. In February the division moved to Leningrad Front for the first time, back to Volkhov Front in March, then again to Leningrad Front in April, where it would remain until November 1944. In June it was assigned to 43rd Rifle Corps, and that corps was moved to 67th Army in July. On September 15, 67th Army launched the sixth and final offensive on Siniavino. Following a revised artillery firing plan, the ruined village was taken in 30 minutes by the 30th Guards Rifle Corps, backed by the rest of 67th Army, although further efforts bogged down and the offensive was halted on the 18th.

In the buildup to the Leningrad–Novgorod Offensive, the 314th was transferred first to the 108th Rifle Corps in December 1943, then to the 122nd Rifle Corps in January, back in the 2nd Shock Army, which was moved to the Oranienbaum Bridgehead before the offensive. During the winter battles to come the rifle regiments in the division were each organized with two rifle battalions and one ski battalion. The ski battalion was reorganized as a regular rifle battalion in spring when the snow melted. Each of these rifle battalions, by March 1944, had the following composition:

- 3 rifle companies, each with nine LMGs, one HMG, two 50mm mortars; each company had one platoon of SMGs, the rest with rifles
- 1 MG Company with nine HMGs
- 1 Mortar Company with six 82mm mortars
- 1 Antitank rifle platoon with six antitank rifles.

On January 14, 1944, 2nd Shock attacked out of the bridgehead as part of the offensive that finally drove Army Group North back from the gates of Leningrad for good. 122nd Corps was directed to attack eastward towards Leningrad, to capture Ropsha, link up with the 42nd Army coming from the city, and help destroy the German forces in the Krasnoye Selo and Ropsha regions. In the event, after a crushing artillery preparation, the assault of the 122nd and the 43rd Rifle Corps shattered the 10th German Air Force Division and advanced 6 km on the first day. On January 19, 122nd Corps liberated Ropsha, and hours later 2nd Shock and 42nd Armies linked up, encircling the remaining enemy forces to the north, which were soon destroyed.

Following this success, 2nd Shock was redirected westward, in the direction of Kingisepp. On January 27, 122nd Rifle Corps was transferred to 42nd Army, but the 314th was retained in 2nd Shock as part of 109th Rifle Corps. When Kingisepp was liberated on February 1, the 314th was rewarded by receiving its name as an honorific:

"KINGISEPP"...314 Rifle Division (Major General Aliev, Ivan Mikhailovich)... The troops who participated in the liberation of Kingisepp, by the order of the Supreme High Command on February 1, 1944, and by a commendation in Moscow, are given a salute of 12 artillery salvoes from 124 guns.

Following this success the 2nd Shock Army advanced to Narva, and the division got swept up into the confused fighting there, first in the bridgehead battle southwest of the city, beginning on February 11, when it advanced with its corps as much as 12 km in five days before being halted by elements of the III SS Panzer Corps. In March the division was transferred for a short period to 14th Rifle Corps in 59th Army. On March 20 General Aliev handed his command to Col. Mikhail Sergeevich Elshinov, who would lead the division for the next six months.

== Karelian Offensive ==
In April, STAVKA's attention turned to completing the war with Finland. In May, the 314th was assigned to the 23rd Army in the eastern sector of the Soviet-Finnish front in the Isthmus of Karelia, giving it a chance to rest and recuperate after the previous campaign. It was now assigned to the 115th Rifle Corps, where it would remain until just before the start of the new campaign, when it was reassigned to the 108th Rifle Corps, in the Leningrad Front reserves. The offensive opened on June 10 with a massive artillery preparation and overwhelming strength in men and equipment, and by the 14th the Finns were back in their second line. At this point the 108th Corps was transferred to 21st Army. The Corps launched an attack on the Finnish 1st Cavalry Brigade's defenses at Vankhasakha and Metsiakiulia that day, but was unsuccessful. After getting armor support and an artillery preparation, a new attack the next day succeeded. By this time, the 314th had reached the neck of land between Vammel'-iarvi and Riesk-iarvi. On June 20, the division, along with its running-mate from the same Corps, 90th Rifle Division, and the 372nd Rifle Division of 97th Rifle Corps, occupied Vyborg, which the Finns had evacuated. The 314th saw some limited additional fighting in the Battle of Tali-Ihantala, after which it was reassigned once again to 59th Army, where it would remain until the end of the war. On September 17, Colonel Elshinov passed his command to Col. Nikolai Ignatevich Goncharuk. That officer held the post for less than a month before being replaced by Col. Pyotr Filimanovich Efimenko, who would remain in command for the duration of the war.

== Into Germany ==
With Finland out of the war there was no need for major forces in the Leningrad area, so in November the 59th Army was assigned to the Reserve of the Supreme High Command, while the 314th was once again assigned to 43rd Rifle Corps, where it would remain for the duration. These formations were all moved south by rail that month to join the 1st Ukrainian Front in preparation for the Vistula-Oder Offensive. While engaged in this winter fighting, the division once again organized a divisional ski battalion from its own rifle regiments to act as the division's mobile reserve.

In the initial phase of the offensive, 59th Army was held in reserve. The main part played by the 314th was during the Upper Silesian Offensive in March 1945. This operation was designed to drive the German forces out of this key industrial area while leaving the industries intact, so far as possible. When it began on March 15, the division was in the Oppeln - Ritterfere sector, and was tasked to launch a supporting attack to roll up the enemy's defense along the left bank of the Oder to the north. On March 16, the division had advanced 3 – 9 km, reaching the area north of Reinsdorf. On the 19th the division was pulled into the army commander's reserve in case of enemy counterattacks. On March 22, the second phase of the operation began, and the division was ordered to attack in the direction of Kroizendorf, but due to shortages of shells, the artillery preparation was weak and the division made little progress. In spite of this, someone in the STAVKA must have noticed that this hard-fighting division had only a battle honor and no collective decoration, so on April 5 the 314th Rifle Division was awarded the Order of Kutuzov, 2nd degree, for the successful conquest of the Dombrowski coalfield and the southern industrial area of southern Silesia, and for displaying valor and courage.

When the shooting stopped the division was officially designated as the 314th Rifle, Kingisepp, Order of Kutuzov Division (Russian: 314-я стрелковая Кингисеппская ордена Кутузова дивизия).

== Postwar ==
According to STAVKA Order No. 11096 of May 29, 1945, part 7, the 314th is listed as one of the rifle divisions to be "disbanded in place". It was disbanded during the summer in the Central Group of Forces.
