= 314th Division =

314th Division may refer to:

- 314th Rifle Division, Soviet Union
- 314th Air Division, United States

== See also ==
- List of military divisions by number
