= Hermann von Wedel =

German general (1893–1944)

- Born: 27 July 1893; Magdeburg, German Empire
- Died: 5 February 1944 (aged 50); Dorpat, Generalbezirk Estland, Reichskommissariat Ostland
- Military career
- Allegiance: German Empire; Weimar Republic; Nazi Germany
- Branch: Army
- Service years: 1911–1919; 1935–1944
- Rank: Generalmajor
- Commands: 10. Feld-Division (L)
- Conflicts: World War I World War II
- Awards: Knight's Cross of the Iron Cross
- Other work: Police officer

Hermann von Wedel (27 July 1893 – 5 February 1944) was a German general (Generalmajor) in the Wehrmacht during World War II. He was a recipient of the Knight's Cross of the Iron Cross of Nazi Germany. Wedel was wounded during the Battle of Narva and died in hospital in Dorpat, Estonia on 5 February 1944.

== Awards ==
- Knight's Cross of the Iron Cross on 8 June 1943 as Oberst and commander of Grenadier-Regiment 590
