= 9th Luftwaffe Field Division =

- Active: 1942–1944
- Country: Nazi Germany
- Branch: Luftwaffe
- Type: Infantry
- Size: Division
- Engagements: World War II; Eastern Front; Oranienbaum Bridgehead; Krasnoye Selo–Ropsha offensive

The 9th Luftwaffe Field Division (German: 9.Luftwaffen-Feld-Division) was an infantry division of the Luftwaffe branch of the Wehrmacht that fought in World War II. It was formed in October 1942 in Eastern Prussia, in the Arys Troop Maneuver Area, under the command of Oberst (Note: The rank of oberst is equivalent to that of colonel in the United States Army.) Hans Erdmann. (Note: Another source has the Division being organized at Troop Training Ground Mielau (Mlawa) in Poland.) Intended to serve as infantry, its personnel were largely drawn from the Luftwaffes 62nd Air Regiment. According to Official records this Division was the first to be formed employing two Regimental Headquarters (Jager Regiments 17 (L) & 18 (L)). It had Six Jager Battalions instead of the usual Four. This meant that both regiments had a complement of three infantry battalions apiece. The Artillery Regiment was supposed to contain three artillery battalions but strangely there was only two. The I Artillery Battalion was composed of three Batteries of 122 mm howitzer M1938 (M-30) Towed (by the Raupenschlepper Ost, Opel Blitz or Sd.Kfz. 8 vehicles). The II Artillery Battalion was composed of three batteries of 76 mm divisional gun M1936 (F-22) guns towed (by the Sd.Kfz. 6 halftrack). The Panzer-Jager Battalion contained two companies of Towed 7.5 cm Pak 40 Anti Tank Guns. A Fusilier Battalion of four companies, which acted as the Divisions Reconnaissance. And a Pioneer battalion which contained only one company the third.

== Operational history ==
The 9th Luftwaffe Field Division, one of several such divisions of the Luftwaffe (German Air Force), was formed in October 1942 in Eastern Prussia, in the Arys Troop Maneuver Area. It served as part of Army Group North on the Eastern Front from late 1942 to June 1944. From February 1943, along with the 10th Luftwaffe Field Division it was partly responsible for holding the Oranienbaum Bridgehead as part of the newly established III Luftwaffe Field Corps. In December 1942, it was assigned to Georg Lindemanns 18th Army (Wehrmacht) and part of Army Group North on the Eastern Front. Posted to a sector at the Oranienbaum Bridgehead near Leningrad, it defended its frontlines for over 12 months. On 4 December 1943 SS-Pioneer-Battalion 11 and the engineer companies of SS-Regiment-Norge and SS-Regiment-Danmark (which had been subordinated to SS-Pioneer-Battalion 11) arrived at Klopitsy as part of the III (Germanic) SS Panzer Corps and assumed new mine laden defensive positions from Field Division 10 (L), on the boundary between it, and the Field Division 9 (L) at the Oranienbaum Bridgehead. The Soviet Krasnoye Selo–Ropsha offensive began on the night of the 13/14 January 1944 and after a 65 minute barrage, Field Division 9 (L) was attacked by Six Russian Divisions. It fell apart leaving a gap through which the Red Army poured with tanks and infantry. The SS-Pioneer-Battalion 11, which had been stationed between the two Luftwaffe units was quickly surrounded and had to fight its way out of a sea of Red Army tanks & infantry. The Nordland units which had been deployed in the vicinity of the Luftwaffe Field Divisions suffered most on the first day of the offensive. Whilst absorbing the full force of the initial Soviet assault, parts of the battalion held on to their positions in vicious hand to hand fighting. 2 Kompanie SS-Pioneer-Battalion 11 lost over 100 men killed & wounded on 14 January 1944 alone, as they doggedly held on.

The Division was destroyed between 14 & 18 January during the Soviet offensive of January 1944 Krasnoye Selo–Ropsha offensive near Leningrad. Remnants of the Division were distributed to the 61st Infantry Division, the 225th Infantry Division (Note: One source states that the Panzer-Jager Battalion was redesignated as the Panzer-Jager Battalion for the 225th Infantry Division. But this must be the remnants as there were only fifteen anti-tank Guns to begin with.) Hans Erdmann. (Note: Another source has the Division being organized at Troop Training Ground Mielau (Mlawa) in Poland.) & the 227th Infantry Division. The Division was Officially Disbanded & struck from the records in July 1944 but had long since ceased to exist by that stage.

== Commanders ==
- Generalmajor Hans Erdmann ( 8 October 1942 – 11 August 1943); (Note: The rank of generalmajor is equivalent to that of a brigadier general in the United States Army.)
- Oberst Heinrich Geerkens (12 August 1943 – 25 August 1943)
- Oberst Anton-Carl Longin (26 August–November 1943);
- Generalleutnant (Note: The rank of generalleutnant is equivalent to that of major general in the United States Army.) Paul Winter (November 1943);
- Oberst Ernst Michael (November 1943–January 1944) †;
- Oberst Heinrich Geerkens (January 1944) †. (Note: Ranks stated are those at the time of taking command.)
- Generalleutnant Hans-Kurt Hocker (February 1944-28 June 1944)

== Notes ==
Footnotes

Citations
