= Karmakshy District =

Coordinates: 45°21′36″N 63°19′12″E

Karmakshy
- District
- Қармақшы ауданы
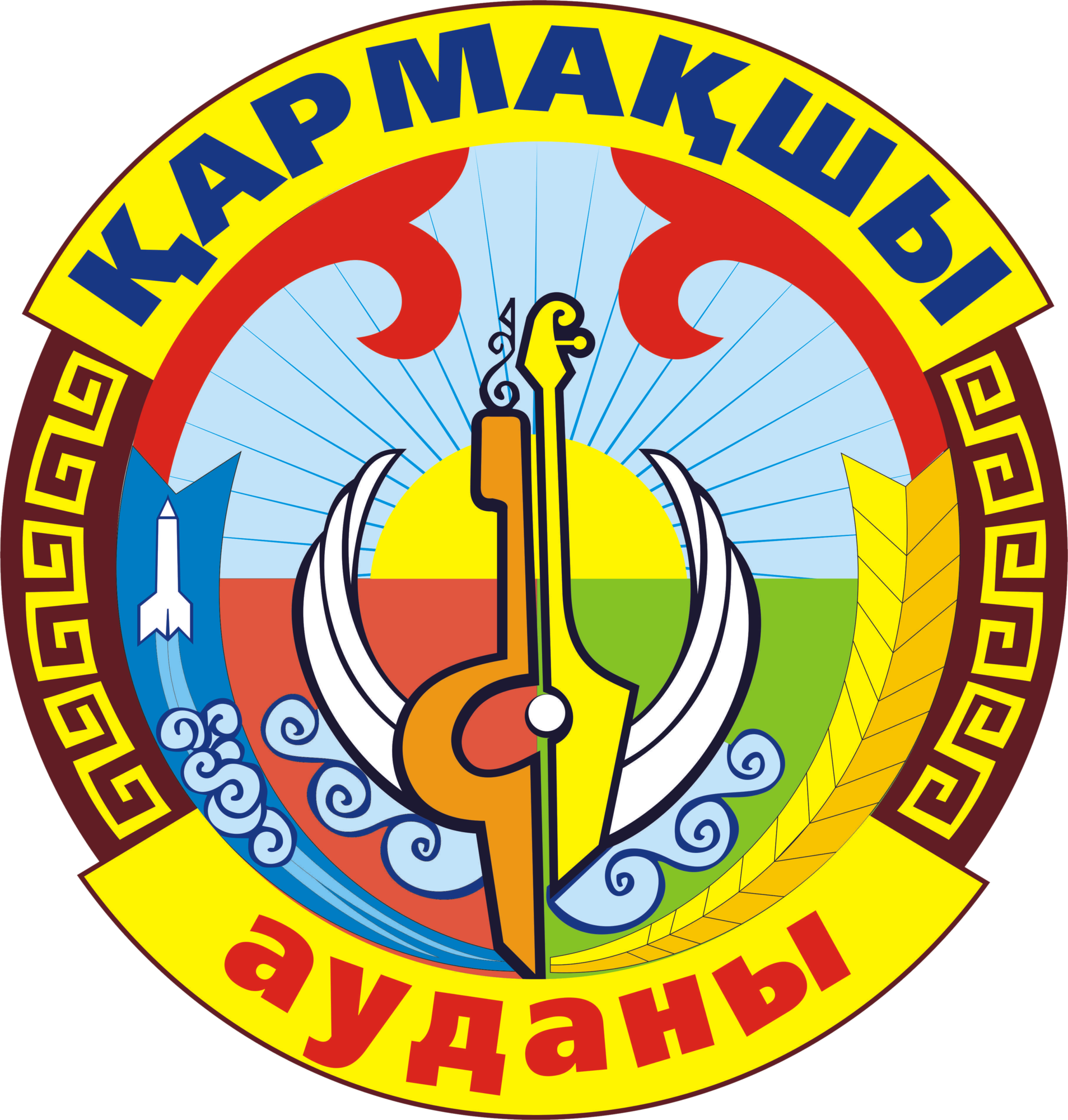
- Seal

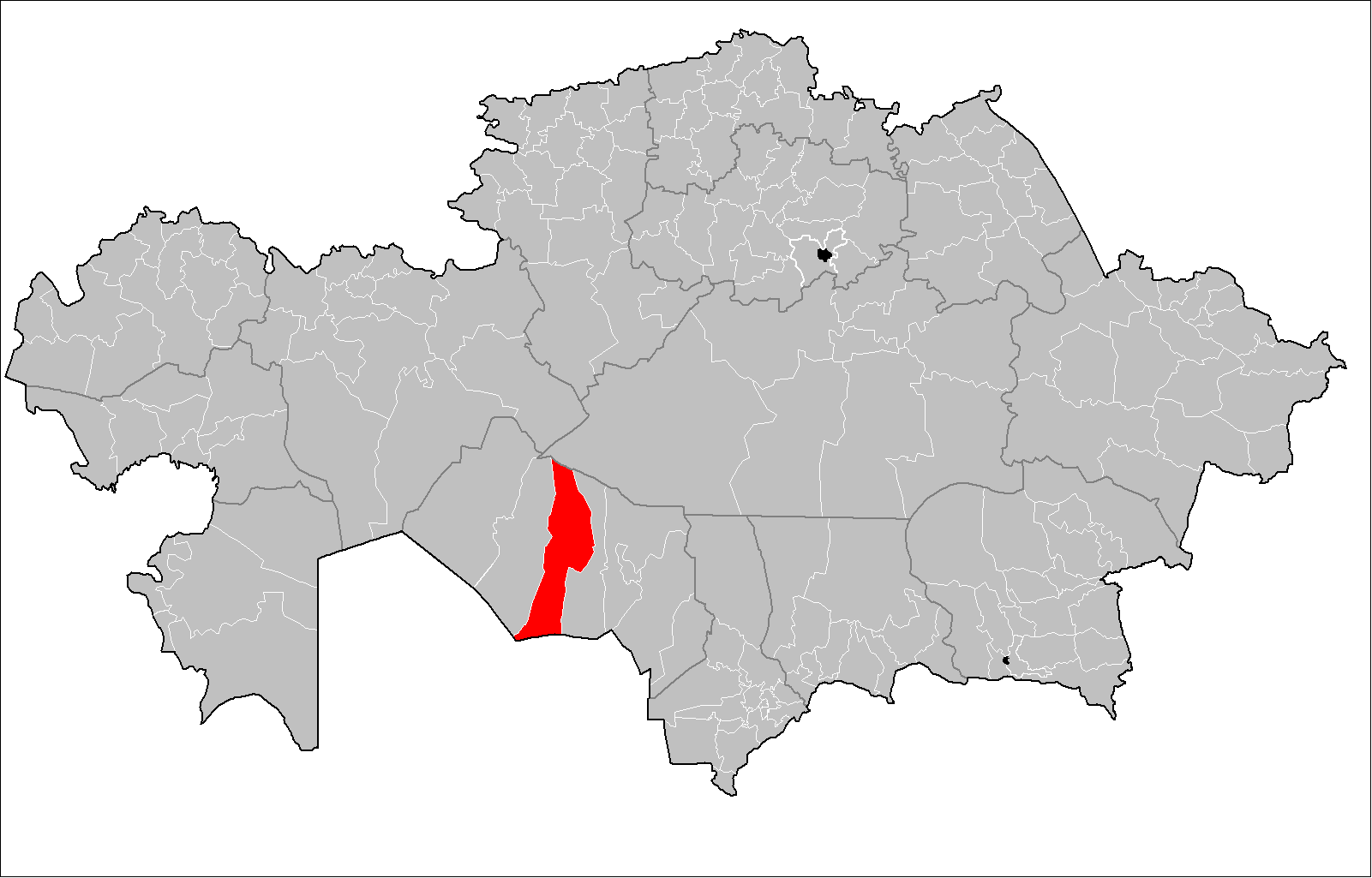
- Country: Kazakhstan
- Region: Kyzylorda Region
- Administrative center: Zhosaly

Government
  - Akim: Zhandos Erkinbek

Population (2013)
  - Total: 52,699
- Time zone: UTC+6 (East)

Karmakshy (Kazakh: Қармақшы ауданы, Qarmaqşy audany, قارماقشى اۋدانى) is a district of Kyzylorda Region in southern Kazakhstan. The administrative center of the district is the urban-type settlement of Zhosaly. Population: 52,699 (2013 estimate); 50,106 (2009 census results); 45,355 (1999 census results).

It is a closed area and for travelers, a special permission is required to visit the town.
