= Josaly =

Josaly Жосалы
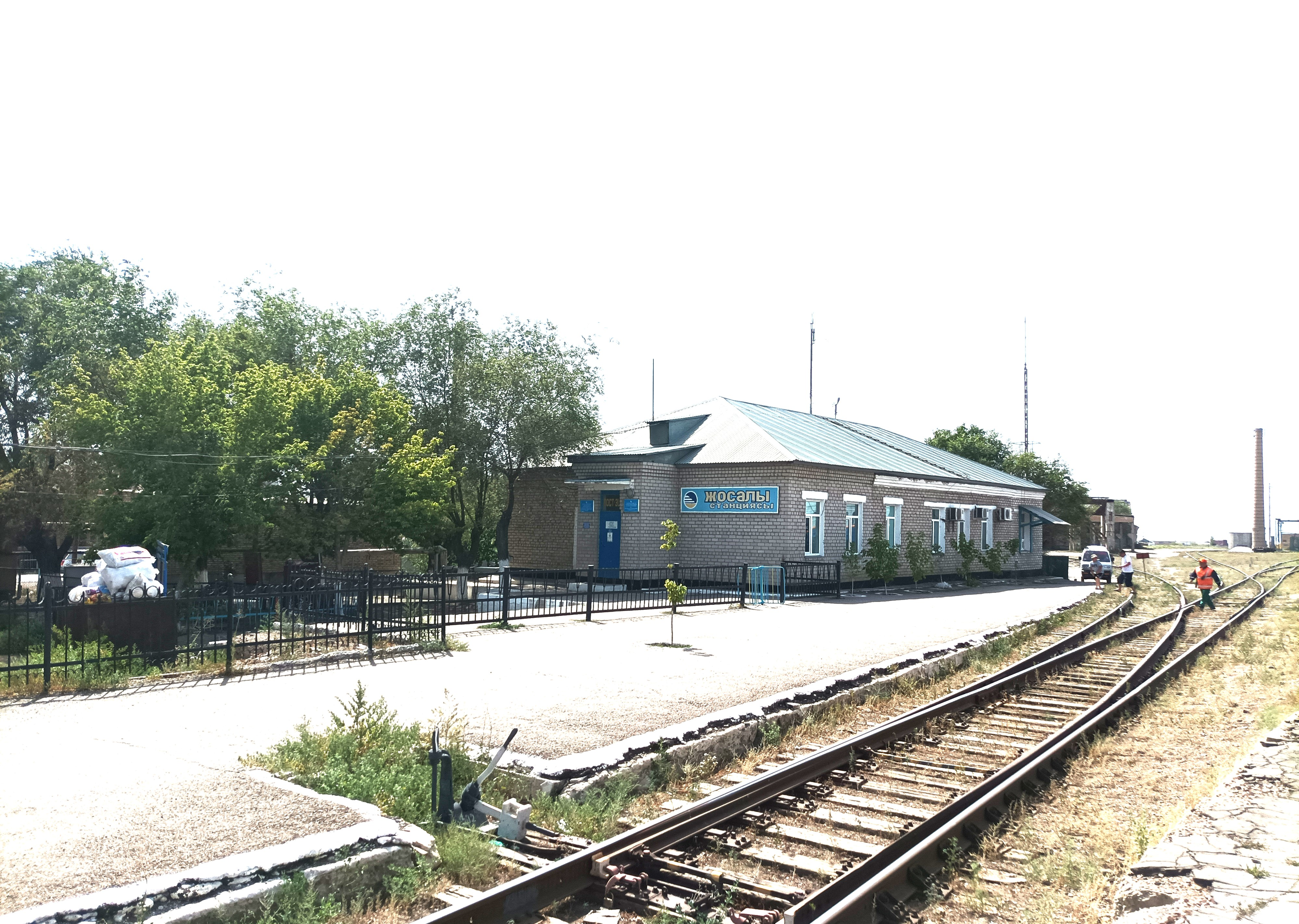
- View of the railway station

- Location in Kazakhstan
- Coordinates: 45.4893°N 64.0915°E
- Country: Kazakhstan
- Region: Kyzylorda Region
- District: Karmakshy District

Population (2019)
  - Total: 18,563
- Time zone: UTC+5
- Postcode: 120500, 120501, 120502

Josaly or Zhosaly (Kazakh: Жосалы) is an urban-type settlement in the Kyzylorda Region, Kazakhstan. It is the administrative center of Karmakshy District (KATO code - 434630100). Population: 18,983 (2009 census results); 18,997 (1999 census results).

== Geography ==
Josaly is located on the right bank of the Syr Darya river, close to the western limit of the Daryalyktakyr plain. Zhosaly (formerly Dzhusaly) railway station, built in 1905, is located in the northern part of the town, 160 kilometers (99 mi) northwest of Kyzylorda.

=== Climate ===
Josaly has a continental desert climate (Köppen: BWk), characterized by very cold winters and very hot summers.

Climate data for Josaly (1991–2020)
Month	Jan	Feb	Mar	Apr	May	Jun	Jul	Aug	Sep	Oct	Nov	Dec	Year
Mean daily maximum °C (°F)	−4.8 (23.4)	−1.7 (28.9)	8.4 (47.1)	20.0 (68.0)	27.7 (81.9)	33.7 (92.7)	35.2 (95.4)	33.4 (92.1)	26.2 (79.2)	17.2 (63.0)	5.6 (42.1)	−2.3 (27.9)	16.6 (61.9)
Daily mean °C (°F)	−9.1 (15.6)	−7.0 (19.4)	2.0 (35.6)	12.6 (54.7)	20.2 (68.4)	26.3 (79.3)	28.1 (82.6)	26.0 (78.8)	18.3 (64.9)	9.4 (48.9)	0.3 (32.5)	−6.6 (20.1)	10.0 (50.0)
Mean daily minimum °C (°F)	−12.9 (8.8)	−11.3 (11.7)	−2.9 (26.8)	5.9 (42.6)	12.5 (54.5)	18.1 (64.6)	20.2 (68.4)	18.1 (64.6)	10.7 (51.3)	2.8 (37.0)	−4.0 (24.8)	−10.2 (13.6)	3.9 (39.0)
Average precipitation mm (inches)	12.2 (0.48)	12.4 (0.49)	12.9 (0.51)	15.6 (0.61)	13.6 (0.54)	9.4 (0.37)	6.4 (0.25)	4.4 (0.17)	2.5 (0.10)	9.3 (0.37)	13.4 (0.53)	15.5 (0.61)	127.6 (5.02)
Average precipitation days (≥ 1.0 mm)	4.0	3.7	3.4	3.1	3.2	1.9	1.1	0.9	0.6	1.7	3.0	4.2	30.8
Source: NOAA
