= Krasnoye Selo–Ropsha offensive =

- Part of Eastern Front (World War II)
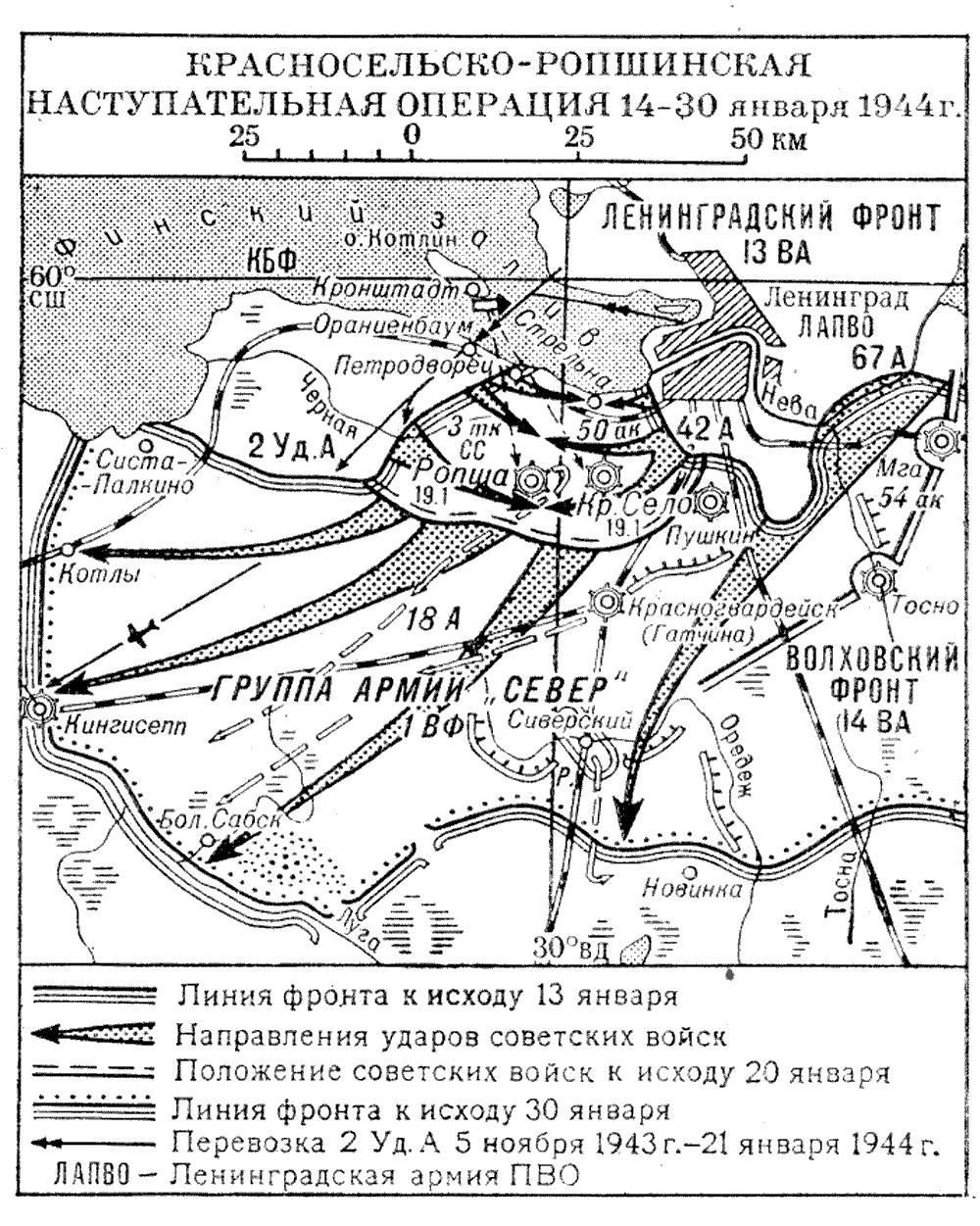
- Soviet map of operations
Date	14–30 January 1944
Location	Leningrad Oblast, Soviet Union
Result	Soviet victory

Belligerents
(Nazi Germany) Germany	Soviet Union

Commanders and leaders
Georg von Küchler	Leonid Govorov

Strength
One army 110 armoured vehicles	Three armies 681 armoured vehicles 1200 artillery

Casualties and losses
21,000 all causes 85 artillery	

The Krasnoye Selo–Ropsha offensive, also known as Operation January Thunder and Neva-2, was a campaign between the Soviet Leningrad Front and the German 18th Army fought for the western approaches of Leningrad in 14–30 January 1944.

== Background ==
The 2nd Shock Army was moved from Leningrad and Lisiy Nos to the Oranienbaum Bridgehead during a number of nights starting from November 1943. At daytime, the barges returned, disguised as committing an evacuation of the bridgehead. In charge of the bridgehead, Lieutenant General B.Z. Romanovskiy was replaced with Lieutenant General Ivan Fedyuninsky.

== Design ==
=== Soviet ===
As a part of the Leningrad–Novgorod Strategic offensive, due to commence on 14 January 1944, the Soviet Volkhov and Leningrad Fronts designed the Krasnoye Selo–Ropsha offensive aimed at forcing the German Generalfeldmarschall Georg von Küchler's Army Group North back from its positions near Oranienbaum. In the process, the attack was expected to encircle Generaloberst Georg Lindemann's 18th Army.

=== German ===
The situation of the German Army Group North at the end of 1943 had deteriorated to a critical point. The Blue Division and three German divisions had been withdrawn by October, while the Army Group had acquired sixty miles of additional frontage from Army Group Center during the same period. As replacements, Field Marshal Georg von Küchler received the Blue Legion and three divisions of SS troops. In such a weakened state, the Army Group staff planned a new position to its rear that would shorten the front lines by twenty-five percent and remove the Soviet threats posed in many salients on the current lines. The plan, Operation "Blue," called for a January withdrawal of over 150 miles to the natural defensive barrier formed by the Narva and Velikaya Rivers and Lakes Peipus and Pskov. This position, the so-called "Panther Line", was buttressed by fortifications that had been constructed since September. The retreat would be carried out in stages, using intermediate defensive positions, the most important of which was the Rollbahn Line formed on the October Railway running through Tosno, Lyuban and Chudovo. There the two most exposed army corps, the XXVI and XXVIII, would regroup before proceeding farther back to their positions in the Panther Line.

The fate of Army Group North turned for the worse in the new year, for Hitler rejected all proposals for an early withdrawal into the "Panther" position, insisting that the Soviet forces be kept as far as possible from Germany and that they be forced to pay dearly for each meter of ground. Finally, Hitler transferred three more first-rate infantry divisions out of Army Group North to reinforce Erich von Manstein's Army Group South as it reeled back from the Dnieper River under continuous Soviet assault. Field Marshal von Küchler now held an extremely precarious position, and could only await events on the Leningrad and Volkhov Fronts with great pessimism.

== Combat activity ==
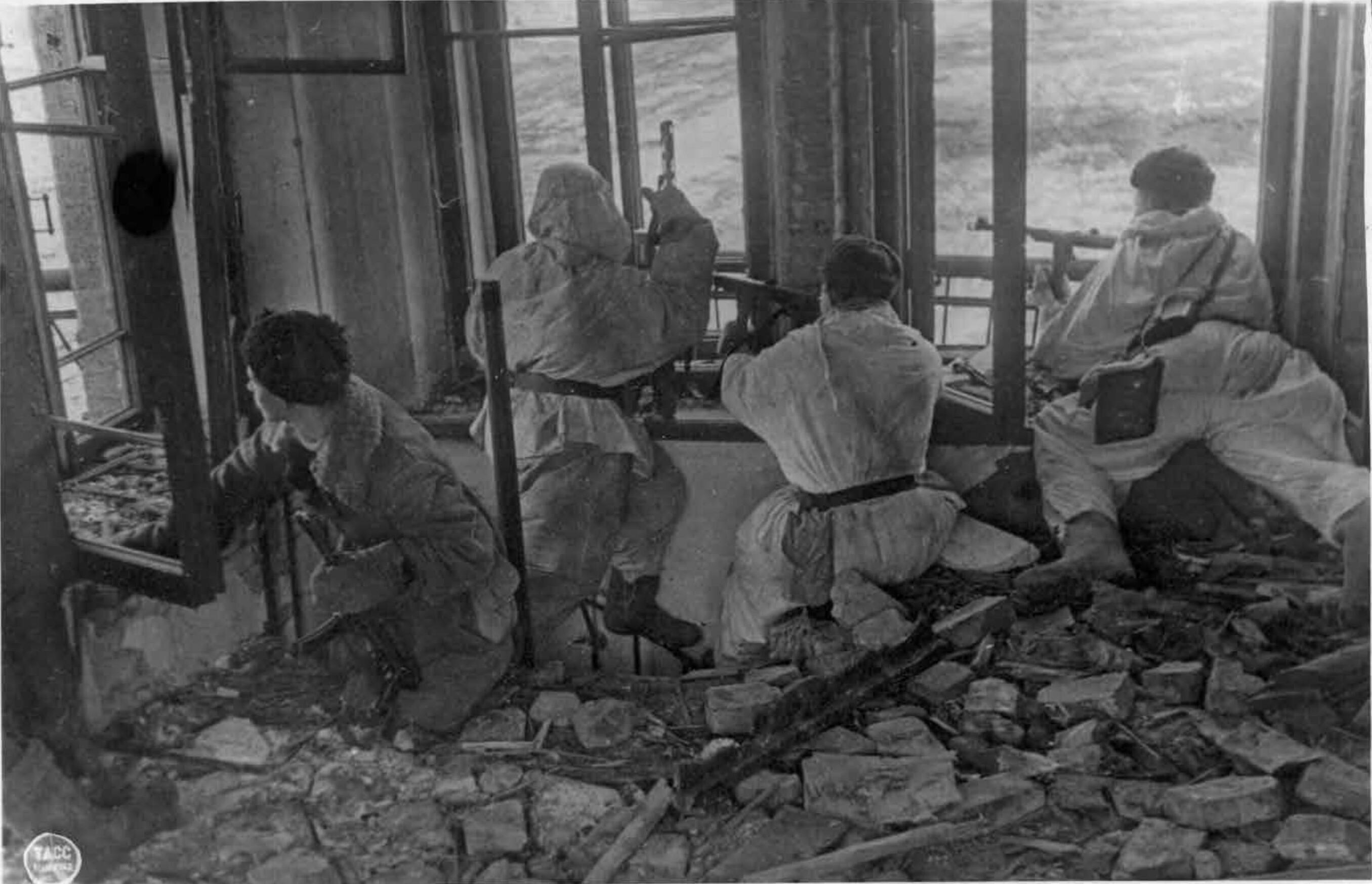
Soviet submachine gunners firing from a building in Krasnoye Selo at retreating German troops, January 1944

Fedyuninsky's 2nd Shock Army and General Ivan Maslennikov's 42nd Army fell on the sector of Obergruppenführer Felix Steiner's III (Germanic) SS Panzer Corps, hitting the area of the 9th and 10th Luftwaffe Field Divisions. By the third day of the offensive, the 2nd Shock Army broke through the German lines with a penetration 23 kilometers wide. The Luftwaffe units crumbled quickly, and Army Group North fell back to new positions along the Narva river in Estonia. In a key Soviet assault on January 19, the 63rd Guards Rifle Division seized German positions to the front of Krasnoye Selo. On January 19, the 2nd Shock Army took Ropša and the 42nd Army liberated Krasnoye Selo.

== Aftermath ==
By January 30, the Soviet attacks by the 2nd Shock and 42nd Armies cost the German forces around 21,000 casualties, captured 85 artillery pieces ranging in caliber from 15 cm to 40 cm, and pushed them back by between 60 and 100 kilometers. The Krasnoye Selo–Ropsha offensive was part of the operations of the Volkhov and Leningrad fronts that broke the Siege of Leningrad concluding an almost 900-day battle. Launching the Kingisepp–Gdov offensive on 1 February, the 2nd Shock Army's 109th Rifle Corps captured the town of Kingisepp.
