= 10th Luftwaffe Field Division =

- Active: 1942–1944
- Country: Nazi Germany
- Branch: Luftwaffe
- Type: Infantry
- Size: Division
- Engagements: World War II; Eastern Front; Oranienbaum Bridgehead; Battle of Krasny Bor; Krasnoye Selo–Ropsha offensive

The 10th Luftwaffe Field Division (German: 10. Luftwaffen-Feld-Division) was an infantry division of the Luftwaffe branch of the Wehrmacht that fought in World War II. Fliegerregiment 72 originally led by Oberst Herbert Pfeiffer and stationed in the town of Detmold, Westphalia, was the cadre unit used to create 10th Luftwaffe Field Division between October and December 1942. The division was organized around two Jager Regiments: Luftwaffen-Jager-Regiment 19 and Luftwaffen-Jager-Regiment 20, with three battalions each. The Divisional Artillery Regiment was larger than normal and comprised four artillery battalions instead of the usual two or three. This was done by completely outfitting the unit with Luftwaffe Equipment. IV Artillerie-Battalion was the heavy unit being equipped with three batteries of the deadly Flak 36 8.8 cm Flak 18/36/37/41 Guns. I Artillerie-Battalion contained two light artillery batteries made up of twelve type 40 10 cm Nebelwerfer 40 rocket launchers towed by the Opel Blitz vehicles and two batteries armed with captured Russian 76 mm divisional gun M1936 (F-22) guns towed (by the Opel Blitz vehicles). II Artillerie-Battalion contained two batteries armed with towed Czech made Škoda 75 mm Model 15 mountain guns with four guns each. III Artillerie-Battalion had two batteries of Flak 38 2 cm Flak 30, Flak 38 and Flakvierling 38 and one battery of Flak 37 3.7 cm Flak 18/36/37 flak guns. The rest of the division consisted of a Panzer-Jager battalion of two batteries of 7.5 cm Pak 40 anti tank guns and two batteries of Russian 76 mm divisional gun M1942 (ZiS-3) anti tank guns, plus engineer, signals and supply companies. There was also a Luftwaffen-Radfer-Aufklarungs-Kompanie or bicycle reconnaissance company which served as the unit's eyes.

== Operational history ==
The division was formed in October 1942 from surplus ground crew Luftwaffe personnel in western Germany and was used on the German-Soviet front from December 1942, where it was assigned to Georg Lindemann's 18th Army (Wehrmacht) and part of Army Group North on the Eastern Front, where it took up positions along with the 9th Luftwaffe Field Division for holding the Oranienbaum Bridgehead as part of the newly established III Luftwaffe Field Corps. At that time, it was stationed in front of the Oranienbaum Bridgehead in northern Russia near Leningrad. It was posted to a sector where it defended its frontlines for over 12 months. In early January 1943 two battalions of its Jager Infantry were sent as part of a Kampfgruppe to reinforce the 250th Infantry Division Blue Division and took part in the Battle of Krasny Bor just south of Kolopino.

On 1 November 1943, the division was transferred to the Wehrmacht and renamed Field Division 10 (L). On 4 December 1943 SS-Pioneer-Battalion 11 and the engineer companies of SS-Regiment-Norge and SS-Regiment-Danmark (which had been subordinated to SS-Pioneer-Battalion 11) arrived at Klopitsy as part of the III (Germanic) SS Panzer Corps and assumed new mine laden defensive positions from Field Division 10 (L), on the boundary between it, and the Field Division 9 (L) at the Oranienbaum Bridgehead. The Soviet offensive began on the night of the 13/14 January 1944 and after a 65 minute barrage, Field Division 10 (L) was attacked by six Russian divisions. It fell apart, leaving a gap through which the Red Army poured with tanks and infantry. Some parts of the Division resisted but were like small breakwaters. 2 Kompanie SS-Pioneer-Battalion 11 lost over 100 men, killed and wounded, on 14 January 1944 as they doggedly held on. The division was crushed by the 17th of January as its remnants withdrew to Narva. Often as part of a kampfgruppe such as Kampfgruppe Helling, it was composed of SS-Pioneer-Battalion 1 and survivors of Field Division 10 (L). The division was disbanded on 3 February 1944 and the remnants of the division were incorporated into the 170th Infantry Division. Munoz states "Taking into account that Felddivision 10 (L) had the support of elements of 11th SS Volunteer Panzergrenadier Division Nordland and SS Volunteer Panzergrenadier Regiment 48 General Seyffardt in order to stiffen defenses and help contain the Soviet attack, Felddivision 10 (L) performed slightly below the mediocre standards of its sister unit Felddivision 9 (L). "

== Commanders ==
- Generalmajor Walter Wadehn, (25 September 1942 - 5 November 1943)
- Generalmajor Hermann von Wedel (5 November 1943 - 29 January 1944)

== Notes ==
Footnotes

Citations

== Sources ==
- Lexikon der Wehrmacht Luftwaffen-Felddivision 10
- Lexikon der Wehrmacht 10. Feld-Division (L)
