= Oranienbaum Bridgehead =

Aspect of the siege of Leningrad

The front on 21 September 1941

The Oranienbaum Bridgehead (Ораниенбаумский плацдарм in Russian) was an isolated portion of the Leningrad Oblast in Russia, which was retained under Soviet control during the siege of Leningrad in World War II. It played a significant role in protecting the city.

== History ==
The area is located near the town of Lomonosov (formerly Oranienbaum) and centred on the Krasnaya Gorka Fort complex. The Germans approached Leningrad in early September 1941 and reached the Gulf of Finland on 7 September, isolating an area 65 km (40 mi) long and up to 25 km (16 mi) deep along the Baltic coast. This area was fortified and defended by the soldiers of the Red Army and sailors of the Baltic Fleet. An attempt to link up with the main Soviet forces around Leningrad, the Strelna Peterhof operation (ru) was mounted from 5 to 10 October but failed. On 2 November 1941, the 19th Rifle Corps was reorganised as the 2nd Neva Operations Group, then quickly the Coastal Operations Group, of the Leningrad Front to defend the pocket. It initially included the 48th Rifle Division and the 2nd and 5th Naval Rifle Brigades, under the former commander of the 19th Rifle Corps, General Antonov.

Later the garrison included the 48th Rifle Division, the 98th Rifle Division, the 168th Rifle Division and parts of the Baltic Fleet which provided gunfire support and supply. The commander between 1942 and 1943 was General Vladimir Romanovsky. He was replaced by Ivan Fedyuninsky in December 1943. In November 1943, the 2nd Shock Army was sent into the bridgehead. A component of the Leningrad–Novgorod Offensive was the Krasnoye Selo–Ropsha Offensive which helped break the Siege of Leningrad. On 14 January 1944, the 2nd Shock Army attacked from the bridgehead and linked with Soviet forces attacking from Leningrad.

== Monuments ==
Several monuments from the Green Belt of Glory are located within the former bridgehead.
