= 13th Light Tank Brigade =

13th Light Tank Brigade (1938–1940); 31st Mechanized Brigade (1932–1938)
- Active: 1932–1940
- Country: Soviet Union
- Branch: Red Army
- Type: Armor
- Size: 256 tanks (1939)
- Garrison: Stary Petergof (1932–1938); Porkhov (1938–1940)
- Equipment: T-26, BT-7
- Engagements: Winter War; Invasion of Estonia
- Decorations: Order of the Red Banner (1940)
- Battle honours: named for Uritsky (1934–1938)

Commanders
- Notable commanders: Ivan Korchagin; Viktor Baranov

The 13th Light Tank Brigade (Russian: 13-я лёгкая танковая бригада (13 лтбр)) was an armored brigade of the Red Army that fought in the Winter War. It was formed as the 31st Uritsky Mechanized Brigade in 1932 at Stary Petergof near Leningrad, assigned to the 11th Mechanized Corps, one of the first armored units of the Red Army. Two years later, the brigade became part of the new 7th Mechanized Corps, and it sent crews to fight in the Spanish Civil War. When the corps was redesignated as the 10th Tank Corps, the brigade became the 13th Light Tank Brigade in 1938. In late 1939, it and the corps participated in the massing of forces on the Estonian and Latvian borders to force their governments to agree to Soviet demands.

After Finland refused Soviet demands to cede territory, the brigade and its parent corps were committed to the invasion that began the Winter War. An ambitious plan for the employment of the 10th Tank Corps to encircle Finnish troops in the Karelian Isthmus at the beginning of the war in December quickly failed due to the unexpected strength of Finnish anti-tank defenses, and instead it was tasked with exploiting an anticipated infantry breakthrough in the Battle of Summa. This did not materialize, although the brigade lost several tanks to Finnish artillery while waiting to go into action. It was withdrawn from combat and served as an independent unit from late December, training intensively for the breakthrough of the Mannerheim Line. When Soviet infantry assaults supported by other tank units accomplished the latter in mid-February 1940, the brigade was sent into the breach. However, unfavorable terrain and Finnish resistance limited its advance and it suffered heavy losses. In the final weeks of the war, the brigade participated in the steady Soviet advance on Vyborg (Viipuri). Awarded the Order of the Red Banner for its actions in the war, the brigade was used to form the 3rd Tank Division in mid-1940 after participating in the invasion of Estonia.

== Prewar period ==
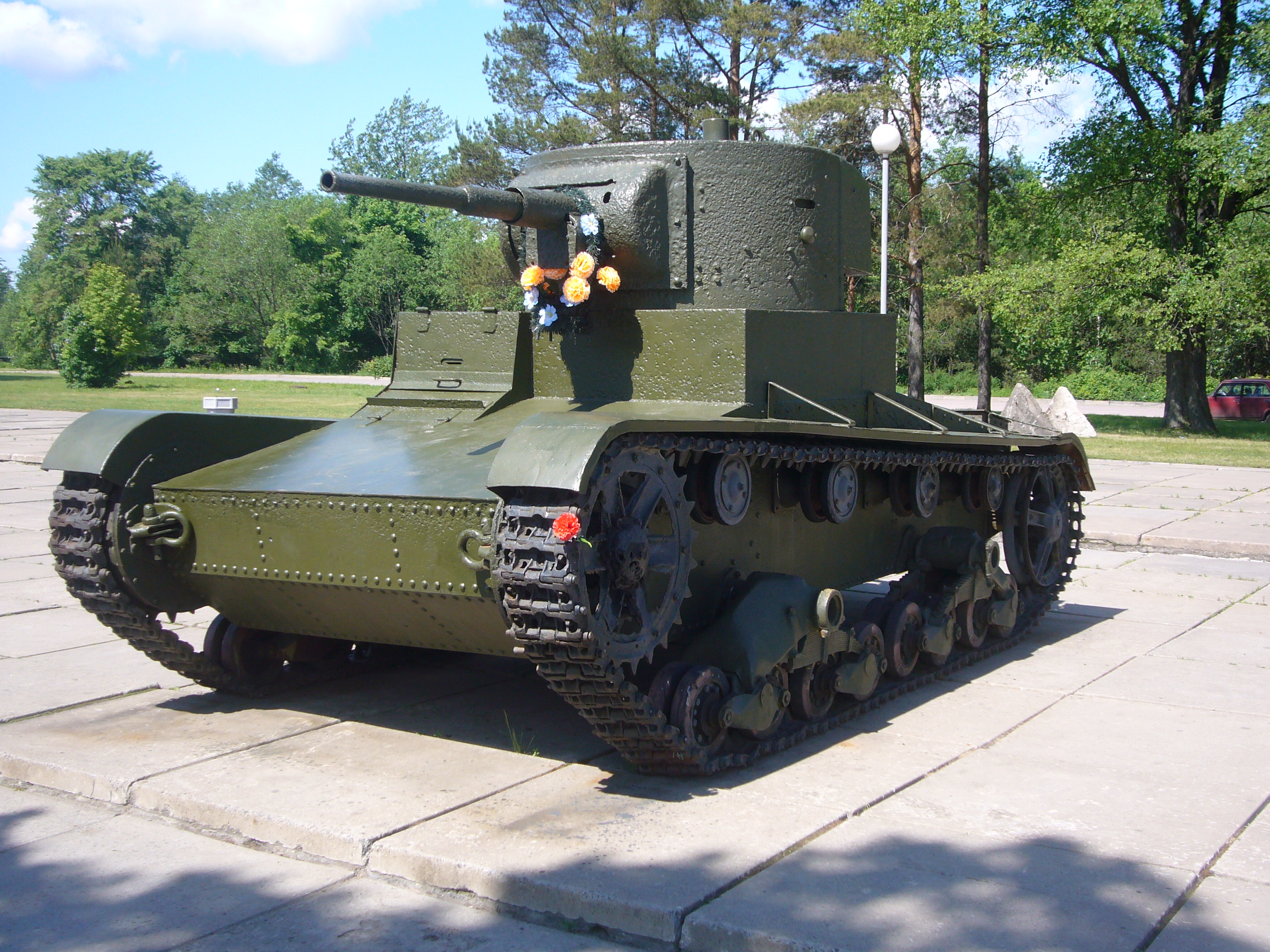
A T-26 of the type operated by the brigade

The 31st Mechanized Brigade was formed from the 11th Rifle Division's 32nd Volodarsky Rifle Regiment between May and September 1932 as part of the 11th Mechanized Corps in the Leningrad Military District at Stary Petergof near Leningrad. It was commanded by Alexey Skulachenko from its formation until early 1935. One of the two original mechanized corps of the Red Army, the 11th was formed as a result of a massive expansion in Soviet tank production. Equipped with T-26 light tanks, the brigade had an authorized strength of 220 tanks, 56 armored cars, and 27 guns among its three tank battalions (the 1st, 2nd, and 3rd), a tank training battalion, a rifle battalion, an artillery battalion, and support units. To perpetuate the traditions of the 11th Rifle Division, the brigades of the corps received the honorifics of the former's regiments on 16 January 1934, with the 31st becoming the 31st Uritsky Mechanized Brigade after the 31st Rifle Regiment despite actually having been formed from the 32nd Rifle Regiment. The brigade inherited the honorific of the 31st Regiment, named in honor of assassinated Bolshevik leader Moisei Uritsky. During that year, the headquarters of the 11th Mechanized Corps and another of its brigades were relocated to the Transbaikal Military District as a result of rising tensions with Japan. The 31st was left behind in the Leningrad Military District and became part of the new 7th Mechanized Corps.

Colonel Vladimir Gorev became brigade commander in February 1935 and after he was sent to assist the Spanish Republican Army in their civil war, Colonel Ivan Korchagin took command in November 1936. Korchagin was arrested in August 1937 during the Great Purge, which also claimed six other brigade officers, including the commissar and the chief of engineers. Three Red Army men were also among those imprisoned, one being sentenced to six years on charges of discrediting the government by "speaking hostilely about the forms and methods of Soviet art". Succeeding Korchagin, Kombrig (brigade commander) Pyotr Kotov commanded the brigade until early 1938, when Colonel Viktor Baranov took over. Baranov, the final brigade commander, was another of the Soviet tankers who had been sent to support the Spanish Republican Army, among them personnel from the 31st Brigade. When the Red Army armor doctrine shifted to concentrating tanks in tank corps, in June 1938 the 7th Mechanized Corps became the 10th Tank Corps, and shortly afterwards the 31st Mechanized Brigade became the 13th Light Tank Brigade. At this time, the brigade was also relocated to Porkhov in northwestern Russia.

The reorganization into a light tank brigade resulted in its battalions becoming individually numbered separate battalions. The reorganized brigade included the 6th, 9th, 13th, and 15th Tank Battalions, the 205th Reconnaissance Battalion, the 158th Motorized Machine Gun Battalion, the 254th Repair Battalion, the 566th Auto Transport Battalion, the 8th Combat Support Company, the 52nd Communications Company, and the 35th Sapper Company. As a light tank brigade, the brigade was almost entirely equipped with BT-7 light tanks, fielding 151 BT-7s of all types on 5 July 1938, slightly over half of its authorized peacetime strength of 270 BT-7s. In addition, the brigade included all of its authorized ten T-26 BKhM-3 flamethrower tanks.

To threaten Estonia into signing a treaty that allowed the establishment of Soviet bases on its territory, the brigade and its corps were assigned to the 8th Army of the Leningrad Military District in September and by 27 September was concentrated on the Estonian border in the vicinity of Pskov. The threat of an invasion by the 134,000 troops on their border forced the Estonian government into accepting the Soviet ultimatum, and on 2 October the corps moved south with the 8th Army to the vicinity of Ostrov in a repetition of the same tactic against Latvia. The Latvian government similarly gave in to the threat of the 255,000 troops on their border, and on 13 October the corps left the 8th Army to return to the Leningrad region.

== Winter War ==
Finland was also faced with demands to cede territory and allow the establishment of Soviet bases, but refused and negotiations broke down. As a result, the Soviets opted for war and the Leningrad Military District concentrated its forces between 15 and 20 November. The corps was halted at Luga rather than returning to its bases and was relocated to the Finnish border as the tank corps assigned to support the 7th Army, tasked with the main Soviet attack on the Karelian Isthmus at the beginning of the Winter War. The plans of the 7th Army envisioned a role of deep penetration for the corps: it was to turn west after reaching Kiviniemi and crossing the Vuoksi River in order to surround the Finnish troops on the isthmus. When the invasion began on 30 November, the 13th Light Tank Brigade fielded 246 BT-7s and 10 T-26s. By the beginning of the Winter War, the personnel of the corps, which also included the 1st Light Tank Brigade and the 15th Motor Rifle and Machine Gun Brigade, were well trained, but their tanks were worn out by the long road marches to the Estonian and Latvian borders and then to the Finnish border, which covered a total distance of 300 kilometers (190 mi).

=== December battles and interlude ===
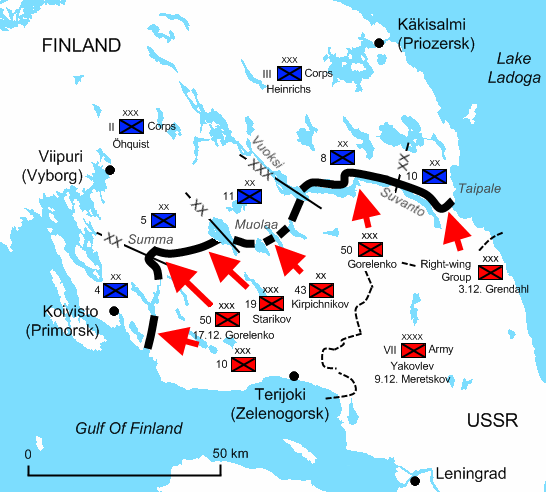
Soviet attacks during the Winter War, December 1939

The brigade was reinforced by a rifle and machine gun battalion from the 15th Motor Rifle and Machine Gun Brigade for the advance. The corps began advancing towards Kiviniemi behind infantry units on 1 December, having to overcome the strong Finnish anti-tank defenses, which included seven anti-tank ditches and seventeen rows of dragon's teeth between the border and Kiviniemi. The 9th Tank Battalion and infantry captured Riikola on the next day after an artillery preparation and approached Suurporkku, where the infantry were stopped by machine gun fire and the tanks by dragon's teeth and a ditch. After making gaps in the defenses by the morning of 3 December, the 13th Tank Battalion, 205th Reconnaissance Battalion, and 158th Rifle and Machine Gun Battalion attacked Suurporkku, which they captured by the end of the day before moving to Rautu. The 15th Battalion reached the village of Suokas on 4 December, but lost one tank destroyed by a mine and two by anti-tank guns while trying to cross an anti-tank ditch. These obstacles slowed the advance of the corps so that they did not reach Kiviniemi until 5 December, and the planned decisive breakthrough of the corps failed as Finnish troops covering the border retreated to the fortified Mannerheim Line and blew up the bridges over the Vuoksi before the corps could capture them. The 1st and 13th Light Tank Brigades came under fire from the line before the corps was withdrawn to the army reserve on 6 December. As a result of these operations, the Red Army command concluded that independent massed tank operations were impossible in Karelia.

Instead, the corps was shifted to the western part of the isthmus to exploit the planned breakthrough of the 50th Rifle Corps along the Vyborg (Viipuri) road in the Battle of Summa. By 16 December, after a series of marches, the brigade concentrated in the village of Peinola, tasked with exploiting the breakthrough of the 123rd Rifle Division by advancing towards the railway stations of Lähde and Kämärä and capturing the Tali railway station. The brigade moved up to the frontline on 17 December, with the 205th Reconnaissance Battalion in the first echelon. A detachment from the battalion consisting of a tank company, three flamethrower tanks, a rifle platoon and two artillery tanks was tasked with capturing the Tali station. Behind the 205th, the 9th Tank Battalion with three flamethrower tanks attached was assigned to capture the Kämärä railway station, supported by the 13th Tank Battalion. The 6th Tank Battalion stood ready to exploit an anticipated breakthrough at Yläsäiniö. The Soviet forces making the initial attack on that day, a regiment of the 123rd Rifle Division and a battalion of the 20th Tank Brigade, were faced by one battalion of the Finnish 15th Infantry Regiment. The tanks from the 20th reached the Finnish rear, but the infantry refused to move farther than the first Finnish trench line, forcing the former to retreat at nightfall.

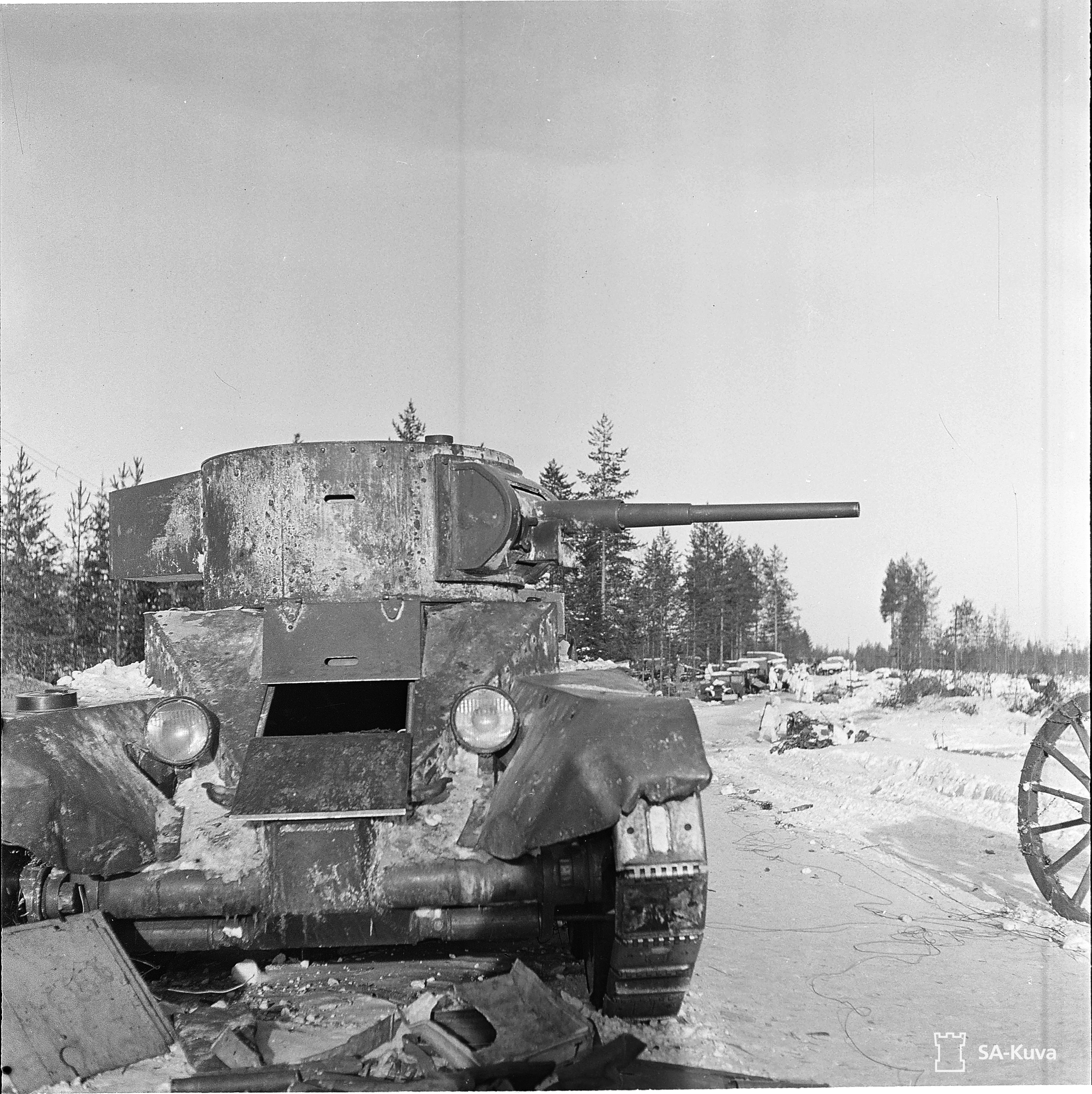
A wrecked BT tank, 1940

Meanwhile, corps commander Komdiv (division commander) Prokofy Romanenko personally ordered the 9th Tank Battalion to attack at 13:00, claiming that the 123rd had broken through and the 1st Light Tank Brigade was already going into action. Two hours later, the battalion moved forward but the breakthrough had in fact not materialized and it was stopped by the first line of dragon's teeth, where a flamethrower tank from the 8th Combat Support Company was set on fire by a direct hit from an artillery shell, killing its driver. When the T-28 medium tanks of the 20th Tank Brigade returned from their attack, one of them ran over a BT-7 from the 205th, disabling it. The 13th Brigade remained on the frontline exposed to heavy shelling until they were ordered to pull back on 13:00 on 18 December, losing two tanks burned out and eight disabled with the loss of six tankers killed and twelve wounded. After this defeat, it was withdrawn to the rear in the area of Bobochino.

=== Interlude ===
The corps headquarters was disbanded in late December and the brigade became an independent unit under direct 7th Army control. Near Bobochino, from 23 December, the brigade conducted intensive training, preparing for the breakthrough of the Mannerheim Line. Soviet tank tactics fundamentally changed: instead of racing ahead of the infantry and exposing themselves to being picked off at close range by grenades and Molotov cocktails while crossing trenches, tanks were now to be positioned in front of the Finnish trenches beyond small arms range and systematically demolish the defensive positions with their guns. They were only to cross trenches under the cover of other tanks to keep the heads of the defenders down.

Picked crews were sent to inform the infantrymen about operations with tanks. Spurs for their tank tracks were produced to increase the cross-country mobility of the BT-7 in winter conditions. They practiced firing at dragon's teeth, finding that a 45 mm armor-piercing shell hit would destroy the obstacle, a method later used in combat, in addition to towing armored sleds carrying infantrymen to resolve the problem of deep snow slowing down the foot soldiers. During this period, there were severe frosts that required a large amount of fuel and lubricants to maintain tanks in operating condition, which necessitated the development of dugouts to heat the tanks.

=== Breakthrough of the Mannerheim Line ===
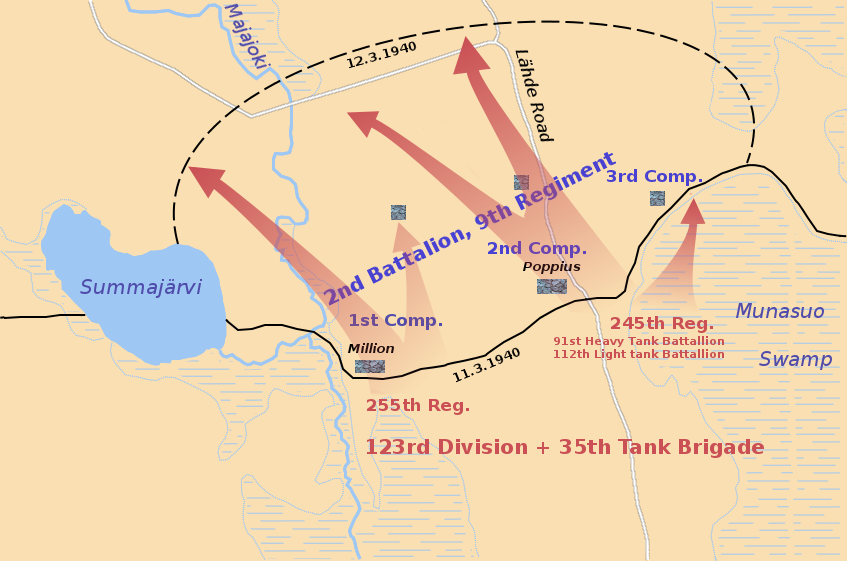
Soviet advance in the Summa sector

The Soviet offensive began on 11 February with the attack again concentrated along the Vyborg road and within two days the 123rd had broken through the Finnish defenses with tank support. To pursue the retreating Finnish troops and develop the attack on Vyborg, on 14 February, three mobile groups were created in the 7th Army, which included infantry riding on the tanks. They were committed to the breakthrough on the same day. Moving to the front on crowded roads, they were delayed for hours: the chief of staff of the 13th Brigade recalled that vehicles stood as many as five rows deep. The Soviet senior commanders assumed that Finnish resistance would swiftly collapse, but were quickly proven wrong. The 6th Tank Battalion of the brigade and a battalion from the 15th Motor Rifle and Machine Gun Brigade, forming the group of Kombrig Boris Vershinin tasked with capturing the Leipäsuo station, ran into anti-tank obstacles and defenses held by the Finnish 3rd Infantry Brigade and the 9th Infantry Regiment from the 3rd Infantry Division. Group Vershinin took three days to accomplish their objective; by then, just seven out of the initial 46 tanks remained operational. Meanwhile, Baranov commanded a group consisting of the remainder of the 13th and 15th Brigades, supported by a detachment from the 1st Light Tank Brigade, tasked with capturing the Kämärä railway station in order to exploit the success of the 123rd. Lähde was quickly taken on 14 February. In the fighting, flamethrower tanks proved effective against Finnish infantry.

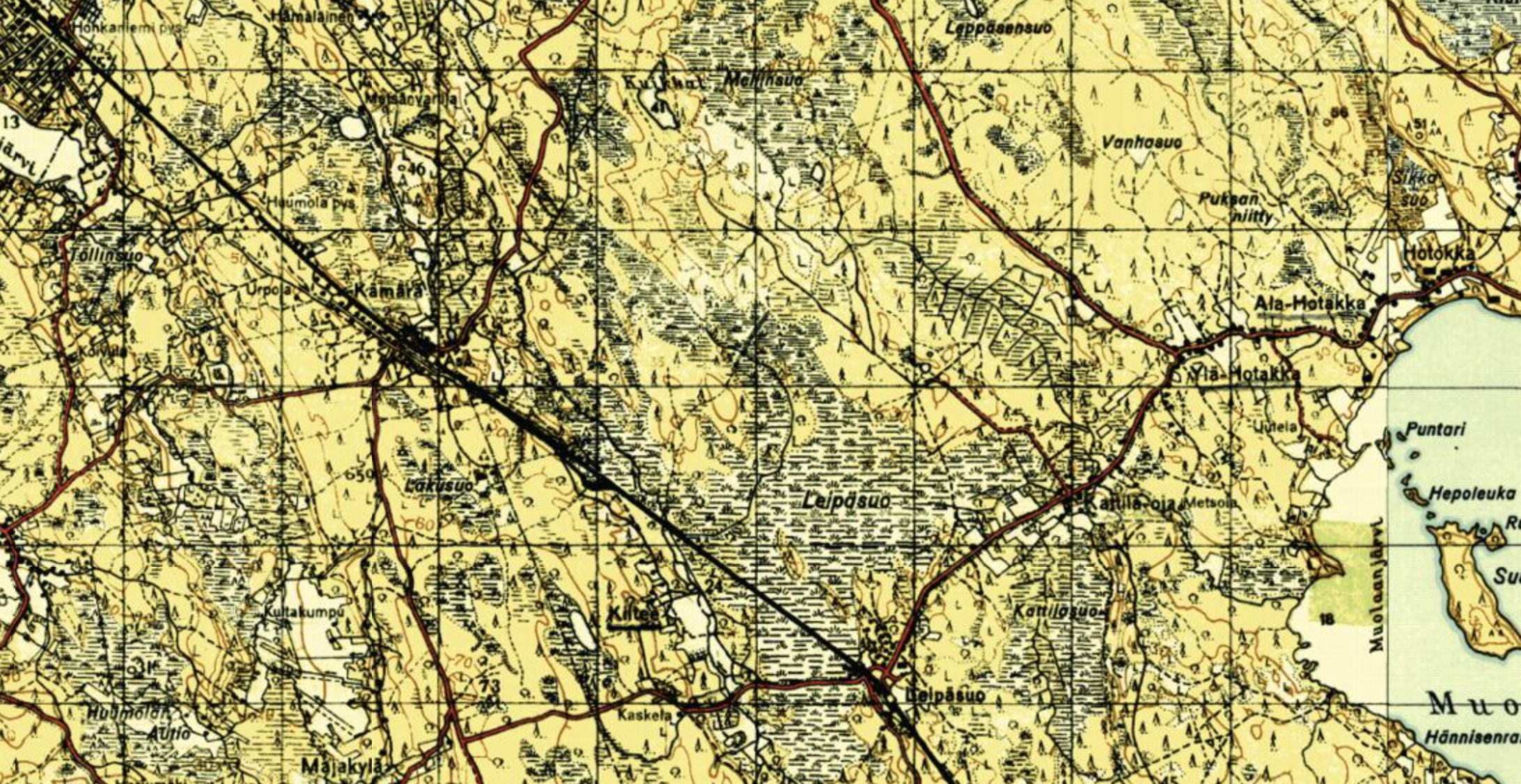
Kämärä and Leipäsuo before 1939

During this and subsequent operations, the 13th operated both as an entire brigade and as single battalions. On 15 February the Finnish defenders began withdrawing to the intermediate line of defense, which only included sparse field fortifications. By the evening of 15 February, Group Baranov reached Kämärä, which was captured in fierce fighting on the next day. At Kämärä, five Finnish Renault FT and three Vickers tanks were captured, as well as 120 Finnish soldiers, in return for a loss of ten of the 13th's tanks. North of Kämärä station, the group was halted by prepared Finnish defenses on the heights above Lake Mustalampi held by the 3rd Battalion of the 61st Infantry Regiment. The 1st Light Tank Brigade detachment attacked on 18 February towards Hill 45.0 with elements of the 84th Rifle Division and reached the southern slopes of the hill, but had to retreat at nightfall to avoid being overrun by Finnish infantry because the infantry from the 84th refused to advance. By this point, Group Baranov was moving forward from Kämärä to support the detachment.

A battle group from the 1st Light Tank Brigade detachment commanded by Senior Lieutenant Boris Kolessa captured Hill 45.0 on 19 February, but their advance was stopped when Finnish infantry blew up the road bridge near Pien-Pero. Kolessa's battle group was encircled in the evening when the road that they advanced from was cut off by the Finnish troops, the 84th again having failed to advance. Though Kolessa was encircled, his presence in the Finnish rear blocking the Hotakka-Vyborg road sowed panic. Group Baranov broke through on the Mustalampi heights on 20 February, and by the end of the day the 13th Tank Battalion, a company of the 15th Tank Battalion, the 205th Reconnaissance Battalion and a battalion of the 201st Rifle Regiment of the 84th had reached the southwestern outskirts of Pien-Pero. This advance allowed Kolessa to successfully break out to the Kämärä station area towards the end of the day.

Due to the slow advance of the infantry, Baranov used a company of the 15th Tank Battalion to carry up to one and half battalions of infantry to the Pien-Pero area on the night of 20–21 February. At 10:30 on the next day, the road between Mustalampi and Pienperio was cut, isolating Group Baranov, Kolessa's detachment, and elements of the 84th Rifle Division with its commander, and Hill 45.0 was retaken by the Finnish. These Finnish successes stalled Group Baranov's attack, preventing any further forward movements against Vyborg for the next six days. The 6th and 9th Tank Battalions and the 153rd Motor Rifle and Machine Gun Battalion attacked the hill on 22 February, recapturing its southern slopes although losing six tanks from the 6th Battalion.

A simultaneous attack on the hill by the 15th Tank Battalion from the north and the 163rd Motor Rifle and Machine Gun Battalion, the 84th's 344th Regiment, the 6th Battalion, and 13 tanks from the 9th Battalion on the next day failed when the artillery of the 84th Rifle Division mistakenly shelled the tanks of the 15th Tank Battalion, destroying two. Flares and radio messages did not stop the firing and only after the brigade chief of staff personally went to the 84th's command post did it cease. The 6th Tank Battalion lost two tanks destroyed by Finnish fire and the 13th two damaged that day.

The rest of the 84th and the 51st Rifle Division slowly arrived at Hill 45.0 between 24 and 27 February, while the brigade lost two tanks on the 24th and a planned attack slated for the 26th could not be conducted because the 84th could not quickly organize artillery preparation. The failure of the tank brigades to achieve their objectives in this period was due to the difficult terrain being unsuitable for tank operations and Finnish fortifications that complicated the employment of brigades and often even battalions. A postwar NKVD report faulted the brigade command for not coordinating with neighboring units in order to create a continuous line and for insufficient aggressiveness during this period.

=== Advance on Vyborg ===
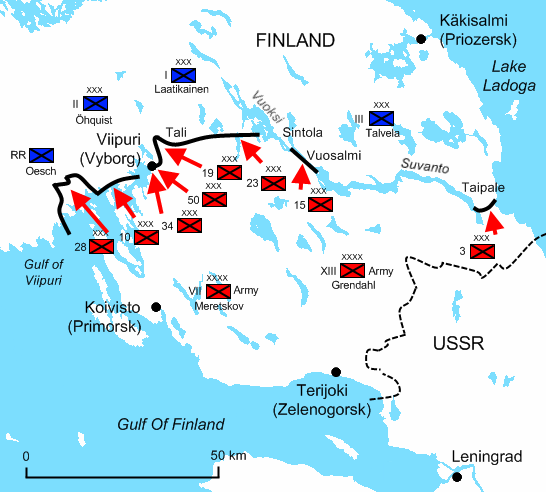
Troop positions at the end of the war on 13 March

The Finnish troops began retreating to their rear defensive line on 28 February. On that day, the 13th Tank Battalion captured the outskirts of Pien-Pero and moved on Lintula before occupying the Pero station after the hurried retreat of its defenders, who failed to blow up the bridge there. The 9th and 15th Tank Battalions with the 348th Regiment of the 51st Division moved along the route from Pillula-Pero and Suur-Pero towards Repola, slowed down by felled trees and landmines in the area of Hill 50.2. On 5 March, the 15th Tank Battalion began fighting for Mannikkala and Tali, defended by the Finnish 62nd Infantry Regiment. The battalion captured Manikkala on 8 March, losing six tanks burned out and two damaged. This occurred despite the narrowing of the advance by flooded land on both sides of the road and the Finnish anti-tank obstacles. Repola was taken on 10 March by the 348th Regiment and 9th Tank Battalion, and on 12 March and the night of the 12th and 13th the 9th Tank Battalion captured Nurmilampi in the face of stubborn Finnish resistance. After Soviet troops cut the road between Vyborg and Helsinki, the Finnish were forced to concede and the war ended on 13 March with a cease-fire following the signing of the Moscow Peace Treaty.

Throughout the war, the brigade carried its supplies on its tanks as the lack of roads precluded using wheeled vehicles. From the beginning of the war, the brigade only had two Komintern tractors that proved unequal to the task of evacuating damaged tanks, and as a result most of these tanks had to be evacuated by other tanks. During the war, it received 67 BT-7s, two BT-2s, and five T-26s from factories, and suffered heavy losses of 122 BT-7s and two T-26s to artillery fire, 63 BT-7s and a T-26 to landmines, and 52 BT-7s and two T-26s burned out. The burned out tanks were total losses while 84 others were sent back for factory rebuilding, leaving the brigade with 227 operational tanks at the end of the war. The 13th suffered casualties of 234 killed, 484 wounded, and 23 missing. The brigade was awarded the Order of the Red Banner on 11 April 1940 for "breaking through the Mannerheim Line". Of its personnel, 353 were decorated for their actions in the war, including eleven awarded the title Hero of the Soviet Union, among them Baranov, while 14 received the Order of Lenin, 103 the Order of the Red Banner, 72 the Order of the Red Star, and 153 the Medals "For Courage" or "For Battle Merit".

== Invasion of Estonia and reorganization ==
After the end of the Winter War, the brigade returned to Porkhov. It was selected to be stationed in Estonia in a plan to rotate out Soviet troops in the country and on 23 April the Leningrad Military District was directed to increase the units selected for the deployment to Estonia to wartime strength by 15 May, which for the 13th Brigade entailed expansion to 2,887 personnel.

Following the success of massed German tank units in the Battle of France, Stalin decided once again to reestablish mechanized corps on 9 June 1940. The Leningrad Military District was directed to form the 1st Mechanized Corps from the 20th Heavy Tank Brigade, the 1st and 13th Light Tank Brigades, the 25th Cavalry Division, and the 163rd Rifle Division. The formation of the corps was to be completed by 30 June, but the reorganization was interrupted by the Soviet invasion of Estonia. For the latter, the brigade moved to Pskov by 13 June, assigned to the 8th Army.

On 17 June, the brigade was sent into Estonia to occupy the town of Puka as a replacement for the T-26-equipped 35th Light Tank Brigade, rejected for the mission by army commander Lieutenant General Konstantin Pyadyshev due to his belief that its obsolete tanks would not awe Estonian civilians with a display of Soviet strength. Lieutenant General Prokofy Romanenko, commanding the 1st Mechanized Corps, emphasized in an order that the brigade's movement was to be conducted at high speed and that in Estonia members of the brigade should not converse with civilians or "turn to them for anything," conducting themselves like victors.

The brigade crossed the border at 7:00, entered Izborsk at 8:08, passed Takhnu at 12:05, and entered Puka at 18:30; it did not meet armed resistance as the Estonian military had been ordered to surrender by their government. However, its vehicles stretched out along the road for 50 kilometers (31 mi) due to breakdowns and fuel exhaustion. On the next day the brigade remained at Puka repairing and gathering the straggling vehicles, including 32 tanks. It sent the 15th Tank Battalion onward to occupy the town of Valga. At Puka, the brigade was assigned to the 19th Rifle Corps by 21 June before it returned to Porkhov and the 1st Mechanized Corps by 22 July.

The 13th Brigade was used to form the 3rd Tank Division of the corps; the new division inherited the brigade's Order of the Red Banner. The brigade's 6th and 9th Tank Battalions were used to form the 5th Tank Regiment and the 13th and 15th Tank Battalions the 6th Tank Regiment. The period for the formation of the corps was lengthened on 23 June with the extension of the deadline for the completion of the process to 31 July. Despite these delays, the formation of the first new mechanized corps was completed by October and the 1st became one of the most well-manned and -equipped due to the number of units used to form it.
