= Medal "For the Victory over Germany in the Great Patriotic War 1941–1945" =

Medal "For the Victory Over Germany in the Great Patriotic War 1941–1945"
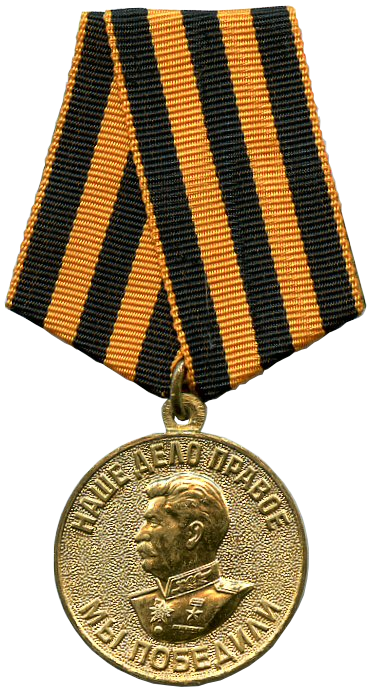
- Medal "For the Victory Over Germany in the Great Patriotic War 1941–1945" (obverse)
- Type: Campaign medal
- Awarded for: Service in the Soviet armed forces during World War II
- Presented by: USSR
- Eligibility: Citizens of the Soviet Union
- Status: No longer awarded
- Established: May 9, 1945

Highlights
- Total: 14,933,000
- Ribbon of the Medal "For the Victory Over Germany in the Great Patriotic War 1941–1945"

Precedence
- Next (higher): Medal "For the Defence of the Soviet Transarctic"

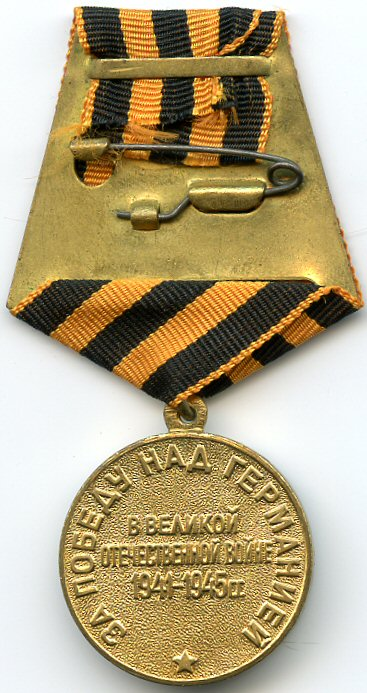
Reverse of the Medal "For the Victory Over Germany in the Great Patriotic War 1941–1945"

The Medal "For the Victory Over Germany in the Great Patriotic War 1941–1945" (Russian: Медаль «За победу над Германией в Великой Отечественной войне 1941—1945 гг.», romanized: Medal' «Za pobedu nad Germaniyey v Velikoy Otechestvennoy voyne 1941—1945 gg.») was a military decoration of the Soviet Union established on May 9, 1945, by decree of the Presidium of the Supreme Soviet of the USSR to denote military participation in the victory of the Soviet armed forces over Nazi Germany in the Great Patriotic War.

== Medal statute ==
The Medal "For the Victory over Germany in the Great Patriotic War 1941–1945" was awarded to all military and civilian personnel of the Red Army, of the Navy and of the troops of the NKVD who were directly involved on the different fronts of World War II and ensured victory through their work in the various military districts; to all military and civilian personnel who served during the Great Patriotic War in the ranks of the Red Army, of the Navy or of the NKVD destruction battalions, but who were released from military service due to injury or illness, as well as those transferred by decision of the state or Party organizations to tasks outside of the armed forces.

Award of the medal was made on behalf of the Presidium of the Supreme Soviet of the USSR on the basis of documents attesting to actual participation in the Great Patriotic War issued by unit commanders, the chiefs of military medical establishments or the executive committees of regional or city Soviets. Serving military personnel received the medal from their unit commander, retirees from military service received the medal from a regional, municipal or district military commissioner in the recipient's community.

The Medal "For the Victory over Germany in the Great Patriotic War 1941–1945" was worn on the left side of the chest and in the presence of other awards of the USSR, was located immediately after the Medal "For the Defence of the Soviet Transarctic". If worn in the presence of Orders or medals of the Russian Federation, the latter have precedence.

== Medal description ==
The Medal "For the Victory over Germany in the Great Patriotic War 1941–1945" was a 32mm in diameter circular brass medal with a raised rim on both sides. On its obverse, the left profile bust of Joseph Stalin in the uniform of a Marshal of the Soviet Union, along the upper circumference of the medal, the relief inscription "OUR CAUSE IS RIGHTEOUS" (Russian: НАШЕ ДЕЛО ПРАВОЕ; NASHE DELO PRAVOE), along the lower circumference of the medal, the relief inscription "WE ARE VICTORIOUS" (Russian: МЫ ПОБЕДИЛИ; MI POBEDILI). On the reverse, at the bottom, a small five pointed star, along the medal circumference, the relief inscription "FOR VICTORY OVER GERMANY" (Russian: «ЗА ПОБЕДУ НАД ГЕРМАНИЕЙ»; «ZA POBEDU NAD GERMANIEY»), in the center, the relief inscription on three rows "IN THE GREAT PATRIOTIC WAR OF 1941–45 (Russian: «В ВЕЛИКОЙ ОТЕЧЕСТВЕННОЙ ВОЙНЕ 1941—1945 ГГ.»; «V VELIKOY OTECHESTVENNOY VOYNE 1941-1945 GG.»).

The Medal "For the Victory over Germany in the Great Patriotic War 1941–1945" was secured by a ring through the medal suspension loop to a standard Soviet pentagonal mount covered by a 24mm wide silk moiré Ribbon of St. George.

== Notable recipients ==
The individuals below were all recipients of the Medal "For the Victory over Germany in the Great Patriotic War 1941–1945".

=== Soviets ===
- Politician in charge of the defence of Leningrad, Andrei Alexandrovich Zhdanov
- Marshal of the Soviet Union Konstantin Rokossovskiy
- People's Artist of the USSR Yuri Vladimirovich Nikulin
- Tank battalion commander Arseny Nikiforovich Semionov
- Lieutenant Vsevolod Andreevich Bazhenov
- Colonel Baurzhan Momyshuly
- Lieutenant Colonel Fatyh Zaripovich Sharipov
- Major Raul–Yuri Georgievich Ervier
- Reichstag attacker Lieutenant Alexei Berest
- Reichstag flag raiser Sergeant Meliton Varlamovich Kantaria
- Reichstag flag raiser Sergeant Mikhail Alekseevich Yegorov
- Lieutenant Vasil Uładzimiravič Bykaŭ
- Admiral Filipp Sergeyevich Oktyabrskiy
- Captain Mariya Ivanivna Dolina
- Major Natalya Fyodorovna Meklin
- Army General Yakov Grigorevich Kreizer
- Admiral of the Fleet Alexei Ivanovich Sorokin
- Lieutenant General Vasily Mikhaylovich Badanov
- Artilleryman Rostislav Ivanovich Vovkushevsky
- Marshal of Artillery Vasily Ivanovich Kazakov
- Marshal of the Soviet Union Fyodor Ivanovich Tolbukhin
- Lieutenant Colonel Petras Ciunis
- Captain Shovkat Salimova
- Lyudmila Mikhailovna Pavlichenko
- Alexey Afanasyevich Dobryden

=== Foreign nationals ===
- General in command of the 1st Czechoslovak Army Corps, Ludvík Svoboda (Czechoslovakia)
- Marshal of Poland Marian "Marek" Spychalski (Poland)
- General and President Wojciech Witold Jaruzelski (Poland)
- Brigadier General Mieczysław Cygan (Poland)
- Sailor Asbjørn Edvin Sunde (Norway)
- General Vasile Atanasiu (Romania)
- Major Roland Paulze d'Ivoy de la Poype (France)
- Lieutenant Colonel Pierre Pouyade (France)
- Joseph Beyrle (United States)

== See also ==
- Great Patriotic War 1941–45
- Joseph Stalin
- Medal "For Valiant Labour in the Great Patriotic War 1941–1945"
- Moscow Victory Parade of 1945
- Operation Barbarossa
- Ribbon of Saint George
