= General Baranov =

General Baranov may refer to:

- Aleksandr Baranov (general) (born 1946), Russian Army general
- Valery Baranov (soldier) (born 1948), Internal Troops of Russia colonel general
- Viktor Ilyich Baranov (1906–1996), Soviet Army lieutenant general
- Viktor Kirillovich Baranov (1901–1970), Soviet Army lieutenant general
