= Pyotr Shchetinkin =

Soviet partisan (1884–1927)

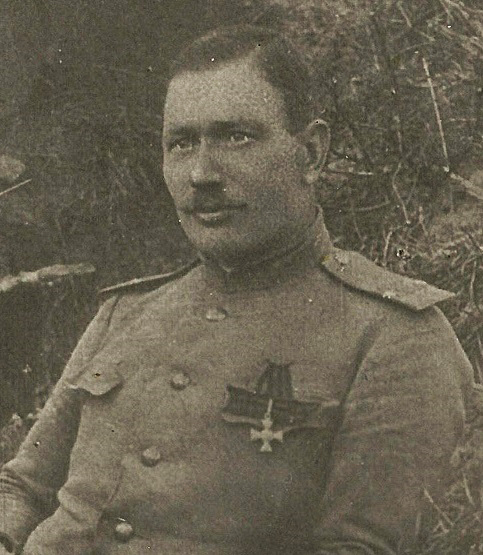
- Native name: Пётр Ефимович Щетинкин
- Born: December 21, 1884 village of Chufilovo, in what is now Spas-Klepiki Raion, Riazan’ Oblast
- Died: September 30, 1927 (aged 42) Ulaanbaatar, Mongolia
- Buried: Novosibirsk, in the Square of Heroes of the Revolution
- Allegiance: Russian Empire; Soviet Union
- Service years: 1906–1909, 1911–1917 (Russian Empire); 1917–1927 (Soviet Union)
- Commands: 35th Rifle Division
- Conflicts: World War I Russian Civil War; Mongolian Revolution

Pyotr Efimovich Shchetinkin (Russian: Пётр Ефимович Щетинкин; December 21, 1884 (or January 2, 1885) – September 30, 1927) was a Russian staff captain who became one of the leaders of the Soviet partisan movement in Siberia during the Russian Civil War.

== Early life ==
Shchetinkin was born to a peasant family in 1884 in Chufilovo Village, present day Spas-Klepiki, Ryazan Oblast. His mother died when he was young and he was raised by his sister. As a young man he worked as a carpenter with his father. In 1900 Shchetinkin moved with his father to Moscow, where he studied construction contracting.

== Career ==
=== Military ===
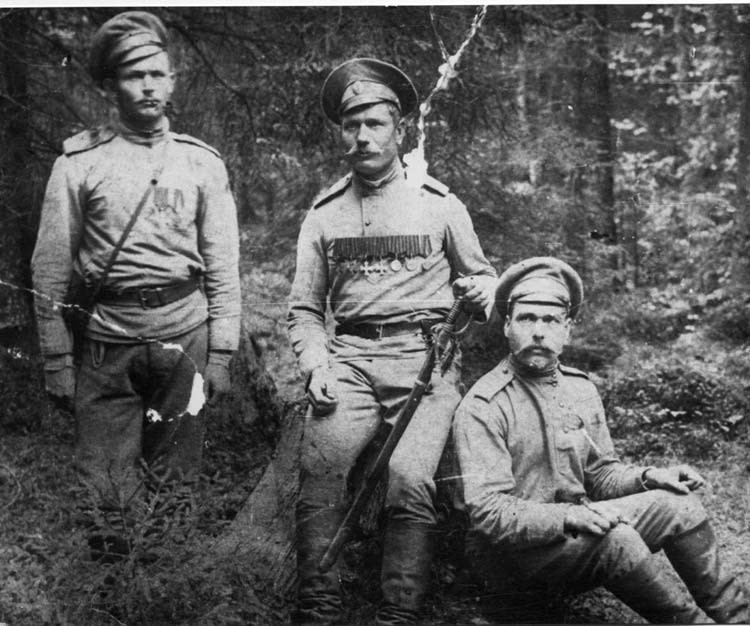
Shchetinkin (middle) in 1915

In 1906 he was drafted into the army and served in the 29th Siberian Rifle Regiment in Achinsk. Transferred to the reserves in 1909, he reassumed his work as a carpenter in Krasnovka Achy County. In 1911 re-enlisted with his regiment and in 1913 was promoted to sergeant major. He was awarded four Crosses of St. George and two French orders during World War I and, as a bearer of all four classes of the Cross of St. George, was promoted to ensign. In December 1916, Shchetinkin was sent to Siberia and appointed head of the training team of the 59th Siberian Rifle Regiment. In 1917 he became a staff captain.

=== Guerrilla activity in the Civil War ===
After the October Revolution of 1917, Shchetinkin played an active role in supporting Red Army movements in Achinsk and served as chief of the Criminal Investigation Department and head of the Operations Department in Achinsk. He joined the Russian Communist Party in March 1918. In late May 1918 he assumed command of a Red Guard detachment assigned to fight the Czechoslovak Legion and White Guards.

After the fall of Achinsk to White Russian forces, Shchetinkin went underground and directed the formation of partisan detachments. In late 1918 he led a combined detachment that routed an enemy punitive detachment. After joining A. D. Kravchenko’s partisan detachment in Yeniseysk Province in early 1919, Shchetinkin became chief of staff of the partisan army. Later that year Schetinkin's forces took Minusinsk.

Shchetinkin served in 1920 as a member of the Extraordinary Revolutionary Tribunal that interrogated and ordered the execution of White Russian Commander Alexander Kolchak and Prime Minister Viktor Pepelyayev in Irkutsk. Later that year he became deputy chairman of the Achinsk district executive committee and a member of the district party committee while also serving in a detachment of partisans and volunteers that fought against General Pyotr Nikolayevich Wrangel.

=== Mongolia ===
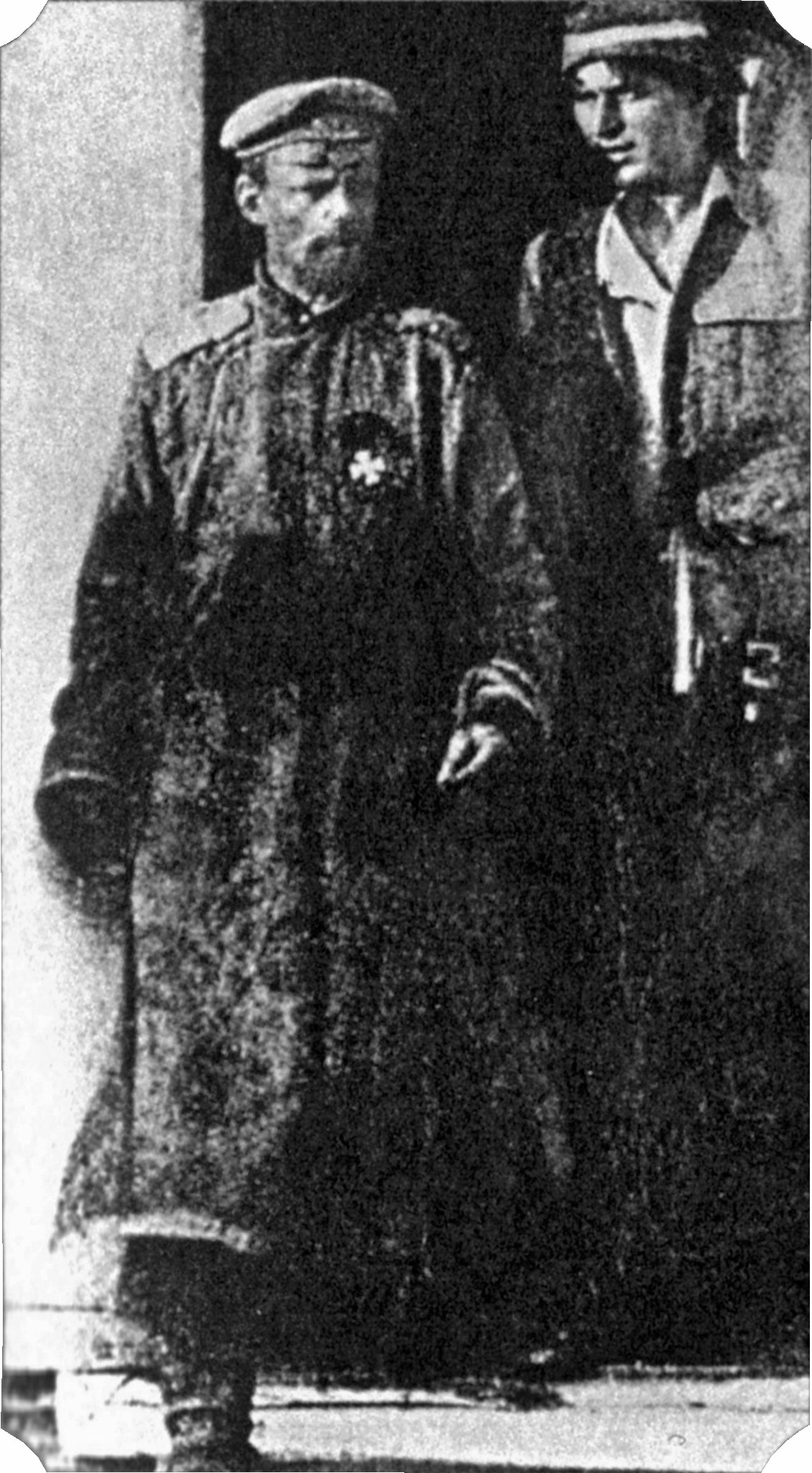
Shchetinkin and the captured Ungern

In 1921 Shchetinkin commanded the Red Army expeditionary detachment that, along with Mongolian partisans under Damdin Sükhbaatar, invaded newly independent Mongolia to defeat the anti-Bolshevik Lieutenant General Baron Roman von Ungern-Sternberg whose Asiatic Cavalry Division had wrested control of Outer Mongolia from occupying Chinese forces earlier that year. Shchetinkin's forces captured Ungern on August 20 (or 22), 1921.

=== Later career ===
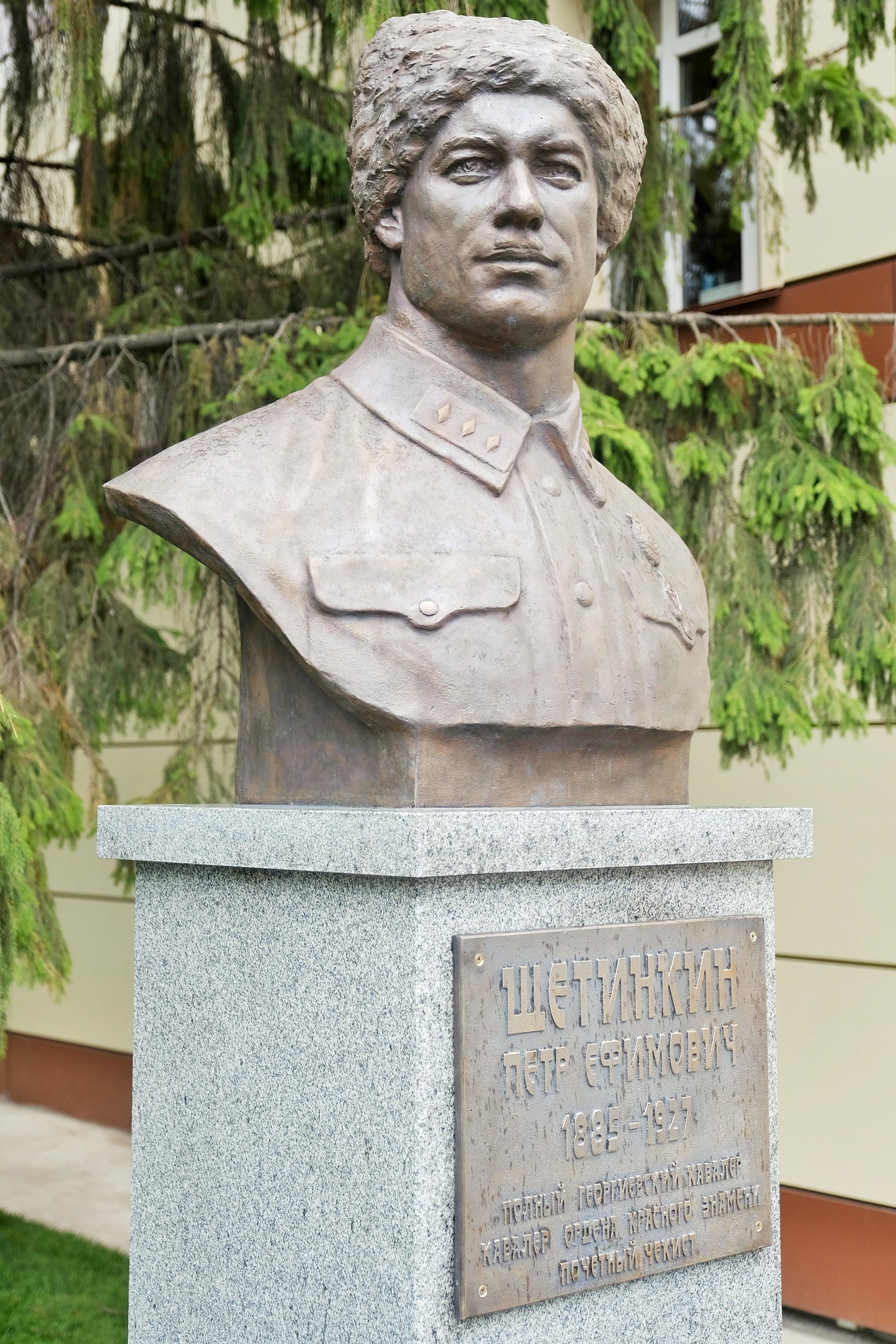
Monument to Pyotr Shchetinkin in Novosibirsk

In 1922 he studied military-academic courses and became chief of the regional department of the Joint State Political Directorate (OGPU) plenipotentiary representative in Siberia. From October 1925 - July 1926 he underwent training for higher command of the Red Army. In 1926 he returned to Mongolia as a consultant in the State Internal Security Bureau and worked as an instructor in the State of Mongolia military protection. In Mongolia he became known as Timur Bator – Iron hero. A monument to Shchetinkin stands in one of Ulaanbaatar's main streets.

He died 30 September 1927 in Ulaanbaatar. Sources differ on his cause of death, some saying he died from either heart failure, others say his death was the result of unclear circumstances. He was buried on October 11, 1927, in Novosibirsk, in the square of Heroes of the Revolution.

Preceded by Yan Gaylit	Commander of the 35th Rifle Division; October–December 1921	Succeeded by Kasyan Chaykovsky
