= Viktor Ilyich Baranov =

Soviet Army lieutenant general (1906–1996)

- Baranov, c. 1945
- Born: 4 January 1906; Tula, Tula Governorate, Russian Empire
- Died: 26 October 1996 (aged 90); Moscow, Russian Federation
- Military career
- Allegiance: Soviet Union
- Branch: Red Army (later Soviet Army)
- Service years: 1923–1961
- Rank: Lieutenant general
- Commands: 31st Mechanized Brigade (became 13th Light Tank Brigade); 1st Tank Division (became 123rd Tank Brigade)
- Conflicts: Spanish Civil War; World War II
- Awards: Hero of the Soviet Union; Order of Lenin (2); Order of the Red Banner (5); Order of Kutuzov, 1st class; Order of the Patriotic War, 1st class (2); Order of the Red Star

Viktor Ilyich Baranov (Russian: Ви́ктор Ильи́ч Бара́нов; 4 January 1906 – 26 October 1996) was a Soviet Army lieutenant general and a Hero of the Soviet Union.

Baranov joined the Red Army in the early 1920s, fighting in the suppression of uprisings in the North Caucasus. He transferred to the emerging mechanized forces in the early 1930s and was decorated for his command of tank units in the Spanish Civil War. For his leadership of the 13th Light Tank Brigade during the breakthrough of the Mannerheim Line during the Winter War, Baranov was made a Hero of the Soviet Union. He commanded the 1st Tank Division in the Leningrad Strategic Defensive Operation, and finished the war as commander of the armored and mechanized forces of the Leningrad Front. Baranov held the latter position at district and army level postwar and retired in the early 1960s.

== Early life and prewar service ==
Born to a working-class family on 4 January 1906 in Tula, Baranov graduated from primary school and the Tula Technical School before becoming a factory worker. He joined the Red Army on 15 September 1923, entering the 17th Tula Infantry School, which became the Vladikavkaz Infantry School in 1924. As a cadet, he participated in the suppression of guerrillas in Chechnya. After graduating from the school in October 1925, Baranov became a platoon commander in the 64th Rifle Regiment of the 22nd Rifle Division of the North Caucasus Military District, stationed in Armavir. With his unit, he fought in the suppression of uprisings in the Khasavyurtovsky District of Dagestan and in Mikoyan-Shakhar, Karachay Oblast during 1926. Baranov became a member of the Communist Party in 1929.

After becoming a platoon commander of the regimental school in June 1931, Baranov transferred to the Separate Mechanized Brigade of the Moscow Military District in February 1932, serving as a platoon commander and machine gun company commander of the 6th Machine Gun Battalion. After studying at the Moscow Improvement Courses for commanders of the Motorized and Mechanized Forces of the Red Army between January and October 1933, Baranov returned to his previous post. He was appointed commander of a tank company of the 3rd Tank Battalion of the 13th Mechanized Brigade of the 5th Mechanized Corps, stationed in Naro-Fominsk, in September 1934. He served as assistant chief of staff of the battalion between February 1935 and June 1936.

Baranov, then a captain, fought in the Spanish Civil War between October 1936 and November 1937, initially commanding a tank company. After a group of Soviet tankers with T-26 tanks and BA-6 and FAI armored cars, led by Kombrig Dmitry Pavlov, began to arrive in Spain in early December 1936, the 1st Republican Tank Brigade began forming from the group, and Baranov became commander of its 1st Tank Battalion. When the Nationalist drive on Madrid resumed on 3 January 1937, the brigade was sent to the front, arriving three days later to participate in the Republican counteroffensive. Baranov's battalion fought in defensive battles alongside Republican troops between 6 and 10 January, during which its BA-6s knocked out several Nationalist tanks. In February, Baranov and the brigade were involved in the Battle of Jarama, repulsing Nationalist infantry attacks, but the battle ended in stalemate.

For his courage in battle, he was awarded the Order of the Red Star on 2 January 1937 and the Order of the Red Banner on 24 October of that year. Baranov also received a promotion to major in 1937. After returning to the Soviet Union, he was placed at the disposal of the Red Army Personnel Directorate, and in April 1938 appointed commander of the 31st Mechanized Brigade of the Leningrad Military District in Stary Petergof, being promoted to colonel that year. A few months later, the brigade was reorganized as the 13th Light Tank Brigade of the 10th Tank Corps.

== World War II ==
=== Winter War ===
Baranov commanded the brigade during the Winter War. In February 1940, he commanded a mobile group of the 7th Army that included his brigade and the 15th Motor Rifle and Machine Gun Brigade during the Soviet breakthrough of the Mannerheim Line. The group, in cooperation with the 123rd Rifle Division, broke through Finnish defenses in the area of Kämärä. During the capture of the fortified position of Pienpiro, Baranov demonstrated "high organizational ability, courage and bravery." For his performance, he was awarded the title Hero of the Soviet Union and the Order of Lenin on 21 March 1940, receiving a simultaneous promotion to the rank of kombrig.

Hero of the Soviet Union citation

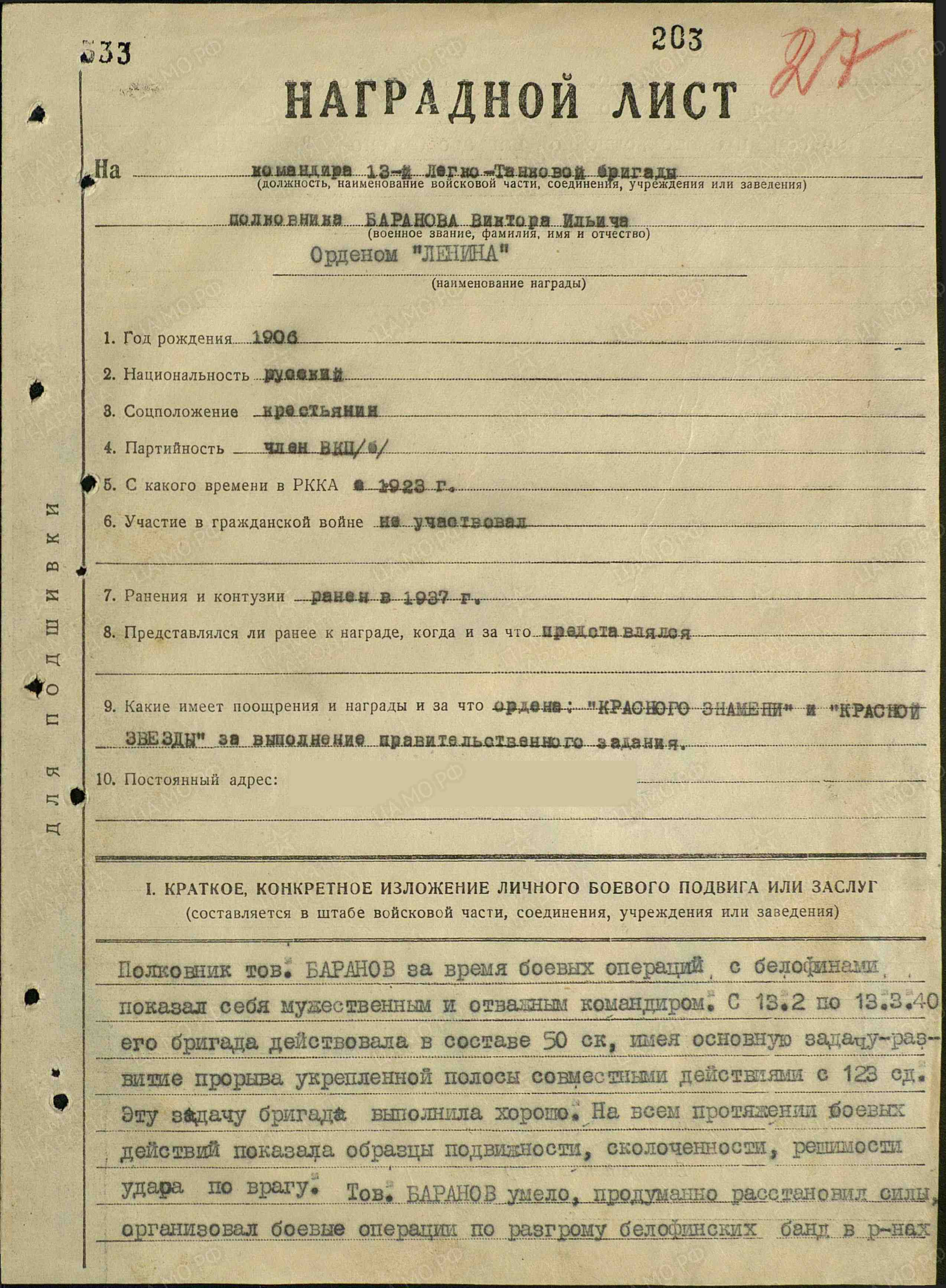
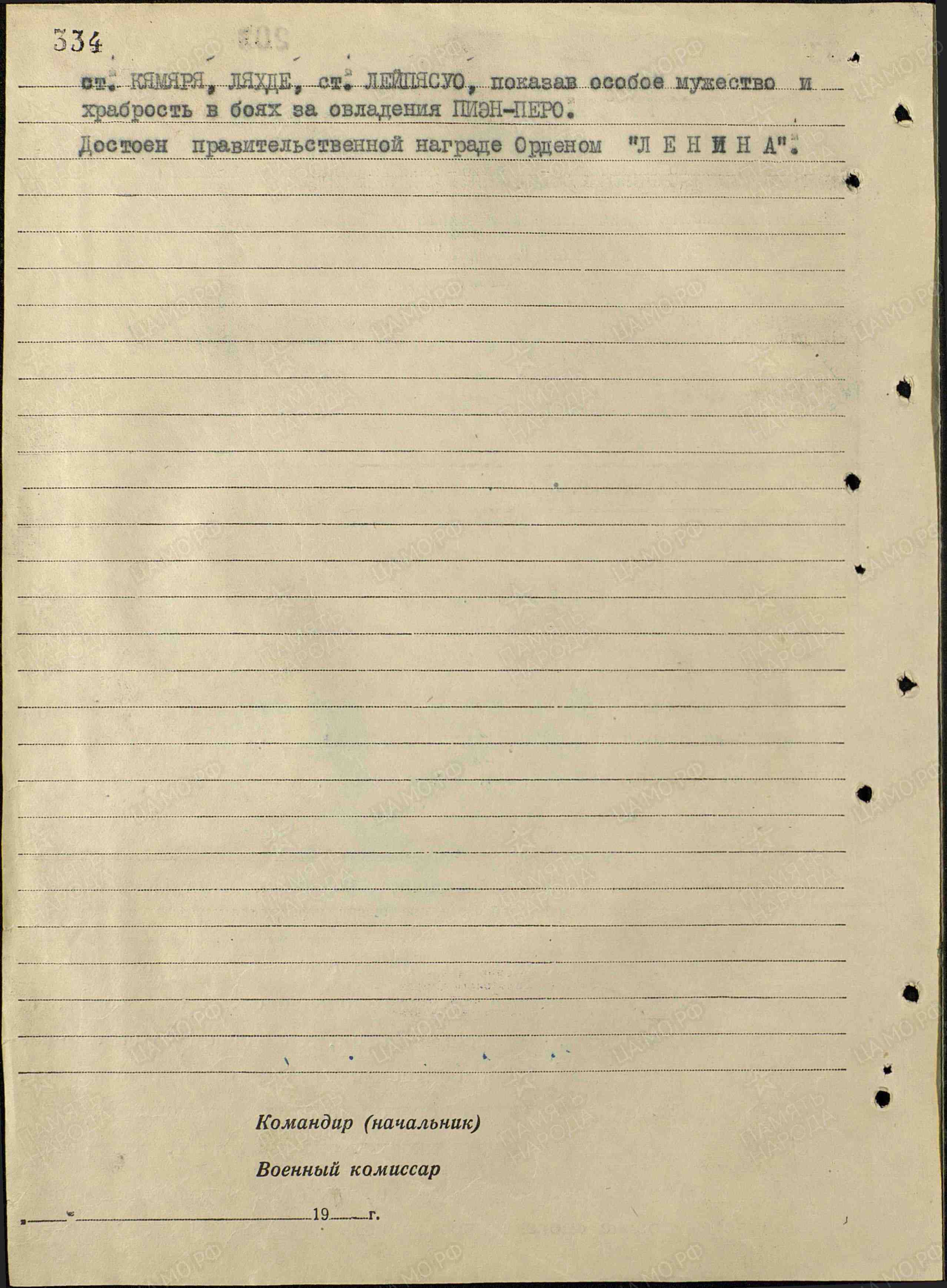
Recommendation for the award of the Order of Lenin to Baranov, upgraded to Hero of the Soviet Union

During operations against the White Finns, Comrade Colonel Baranov proved himself a courageous and brave commander. From 13 February to 13 March 1940, his brigade, as part of the 50th Rifle Corps, had the primary task of developing a breakthrough in the fortified sector in cooperation with the 123rd Rifle Division. The brigade performed this task well. Throughout the fighting, [it] was an exemplar of mobility, cohesion, and determination to strike the enemy. Comrade Baranov skilfully and carefully deployed [his] forces, organized military operations to defeat White Finnish bandits in the areas of the [railway] stations of Kämärä, Lähde, and Leipäsuo, [and] displayed especial courage and gallantry in the battles for the capture of Pienpiro. [He is] worthy of [the] Order of Lenin state award.

=== Eastern Front ===
Baranov, who received the rank of major general on 4 June, was appointed commander of the 1st Tank Division of the 1st Mechanized Corps in June 1940. He underwent retraining at the Courses of Improvement for Higher Officers (KUVNAS) of the Frunze Military Academy between November 1940 and May 1941, then returned to his command. From the beginning of Operation Barbarossa, Baranov led the division as part of the 14th Army in the Kandalaksha sector. From 30 June it was attempting to halt the Finnish advance under the command of the Northern Front. After the German advance from Luga and Kingisepp the division was relocated to the Krasnogvardeysk area. Subsequently, the 1st Tank Division fought in defense of the line of Volosovo, Lake Ilmen, Krasnoye Selo, Taytsy, Gatchino, and Pushkin, temporarily halting the German advance. The German advance split the division into two parts, with one defending in the Pushkin area and the other at Oranienbaum. In late September, the division was reorganized into the 123rd Tank Brigade, which Baranov continued to command. He led it as part of the 54th Army during September and October in failed offensives in the area of Mga towards Nevskoy Dubrovki.

Appointed deputy commander-in-chief for armored forces of the 54th Army in April 1942, Baranov became deputy commander-in-chief for tank forces of the Leningrad Front in June 1942 and commander-in-chief of the Armored and Mechanized Forces of the front in January 1943. In this position, he participated in Operation Iskra, the Leningrad–Novgorod Offensive, Krasnoye Selo–Ropsha Offensive, Vyborg–Petrozavodsk Offensive, Baltic Offensive, Tartu Offensive, and Narva Offensive. Promoted to lieutenant general on 15 December 1943, Baranov was sent the study at the Voroshilov Higher Military Academy in April 1945.

== Postwar ==
After graduating from accelerated courses at the academy in January 1946, Baranov was placed at the disposal of the commander-in-chief of the Red Army armored and mechanized forces. Appointed commander-in-chief of the Armored and Mechanized Forces of the Leningrad Military District in June 1946, he transferred to hold the same position with the Far Eastern Military District in late May 1950 and the 15th Army in August 1953. Having completed the one-year Higher Academic Courses of the Voroshilov Academy in November 1954, Baranov became senior military advisor to the commander of the armored and mechanized forces of the Czechoslovak People's Army in February 1955. From January 1957, he was Inspector General for Armored and Mechanized Forces of the headquarters of the Unified Armed Forces of the Warsaw Treaty Organization and the 10th Directorate of the Soviet General Staff. Transferred to the reserve on 25 February 1961, Baranov lived in Moscow, where he died on 26 October 1996. He was buried in the Golovinskoye Cemetery.

== Awards and honors ==
Baranov was a recipient of the following awards and decorations:

- Hero of the Soviet Union
- Order of Lenin (2)
- Order of the Red Banner (5)
- Order of Kutuzov, 1st class
- Order of the Patriotic War, 1st class (2)
- Order of the Red Star
