= Alexey Skulachenko =

- Born: 13 June 1895; Mikulino, Smolensk Governorate, Russian Empire
- Died: 6 October 1937 (aged 42)
- Allegiance: Russian Empire; RSFSR; Soviet Union
- Branch: Imperial Russian Army; Red Army
- Service years: 1916–1918; 1918–1937
- Rank: Kombrig
- Commands: 31st Mechanized Brigade
- Conflicts: World War I; Russian Civil War

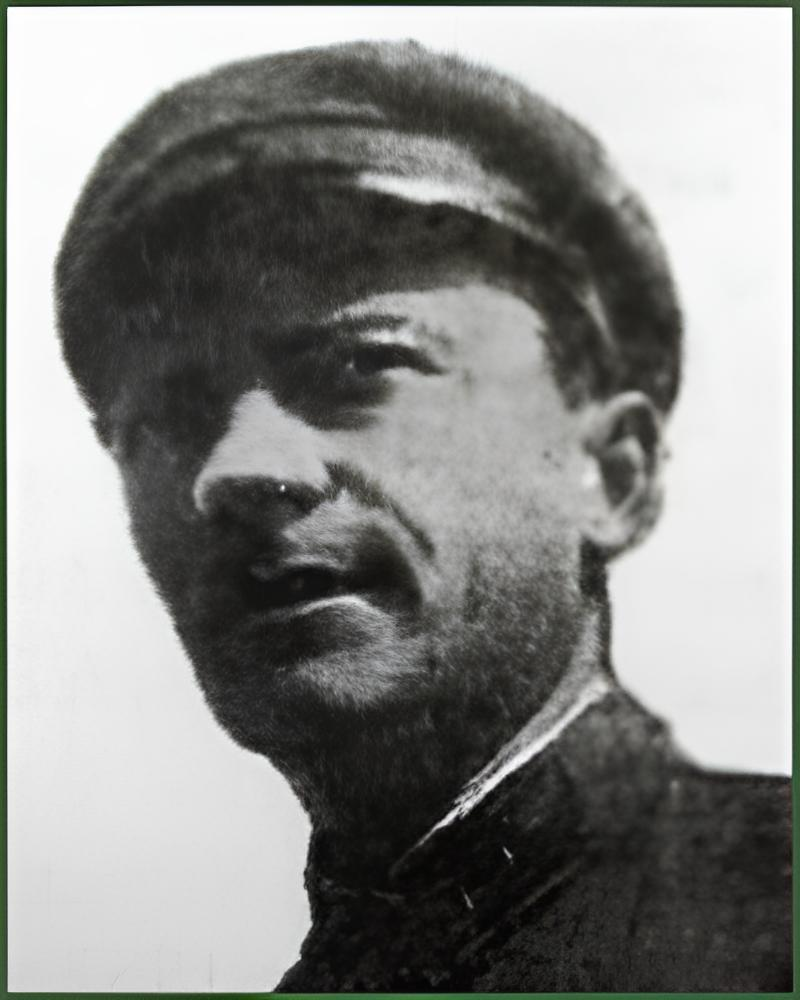
Brigadier General Oleksiy Skulachenko. Kharkiv, 1935.

Alexey Yerofeyevich Skulachenko (Russian: Алексей Ерофеевич Скулаченко; 13 June 1895 – 6 October 1937) was a Red Army kombrig executed during the Great Purge.

Skulachenko served with armored car units of the Imperial Russian Army during World War I and commanded them during the Russian Civil War. He served in staff and command positions during the 1920s and 1930s, and commanded the 31st Mechanized Brigade during the early 1930s. His last post before being arrested was commander of the armored and mechanized forces of the Kharkov Military District.

== Early life, World War I, and Russian Civil War ==
Variously described as of either Russian or Ukrainian ethnicity in documents, Skulachenko was born to a peasant family on 13 June 1895 in the village of Mikulino in Smolensk Governorate. He graduated from the village school in 1907, three grades of a four-grade vocational school in 1910, and a technical school in 1912, working as a lathe operator.

Drafted into the Imperial Russian Army in January 1916, Skulachenko graduated from a training detachment and became a senior uniter-ofitser in the 1st Anti-Aircraft Auto Company, fighting in the Caucasus campaign, and was wounded in action in 1917. Joining the Communist Party that year, Skulachenko distributed Bolshevik leaflets after the February Revolution. He served as chief of a truck platoon of the 1st Reserve Auto Company in Petrograd from 6 August of that year. In September, Skulachenko became commander of the 3rd Armored Car Detachment, and was wounded during the October Revolution. His unit guarded the Smolny Institute in October.

As the Russian Civil War began, Skulachenko joined the Red Army in January 1918, becoming commander of the 2nd Caucasian Auto Company. He fought in the war on the Eastern, Southern, and Caucasian Fronts and was twice wounded and concussed. After commanding the international company of the Petrograd military commissariat between September and December 1918, Skulachenko studied at the Military-Political Course for Agitators and Instructors, which he completed in March 1919. Assigned as an agitator in the 11th Army upon graduation, Skulachenko became political commissar of the 1st Artillery Battalion in the same month. For a week in January 1920 he served as an auto mechanic at the Arkhangelsk Military Port before becoming commissar of the 4th Artillery Battalion. In May, he became commissar of the armored car detachment of the 11th Army, then commander and commissar of the 55th Armored Detachment.

== Interwar period ==
After serving as acting commissar of the engineering depot of the supply department of the 11th Army from January 1921, Skulachenko was sent to study at the Military Academy of the Red Army in November of that year. After graduating from the academy, he was posted to the North Caucasus Military District as a company commander in October 1925 to gain practical experience. In the district, Skulachenko became chief of staff of the 221st Rifle Regiment of the 74th Rifle Division in November 1926 before transferring to the Leningrad Military District to serve as chief of the operational section of the staff of the 43rd Rifle Division in March 1928.

In December 1929, Skulachenko briefly served as assistant chief of the 4th department of the 2nd Directorate of the Staff of the Red Army, but in January 1930 returned to the Leningrad Military District as commander and commissar of the motorized armored detachment of the 11th Rifle Division. A year later, he took command of the Mechanized Regiment of the OGPU Troops, and in May 1932 returned to the army as commander and commissar of a mechanized brigade of the Leningrad Mechanized Corps (reorganized from the 11th Rifle Division), which became the 31st Mechanized Brigade.

Briefly at the disposal of the Personnel Directorate from February 1935, Skulachenko became chief of the armored forces of the Kharkov Military District in June of that year, being promoted to kombrig when the Red Army introduced personal military ranks that year. In April 1937 he was placed at the disposal of the Personnel Directorate and transferred to the reserve on 29 July for "political unreliability" before being arrested on 3 August. Sentenced to death on 5 October for participating in a nonexistent "military conspiracy", Skulachenko was specifically charged with carrying out an act of sabotage (a 'diversionary act') in an armor depot of the district in late 1936 and preparing to burn a repair workshop in February 1937. Skulachenko was executed on the next day. He was posthumously rehabilitated on 13 June 1956 under De-Stalinization.
