= 11th Rifle Division (Soviet Union) =

- Active: 1918–1945
- Country: Soviet Union
- Branch: Red Army
- Type: Infantry
- Size: Division
- Engagements: Russian Civil War; Kronstadt rebellion; Polish-Soviet War; Battle of Warsaw (1920); Winter War; World War II; Baltic Operation; Leningrad Strategic Defensive; Lyuban Offensive Operation; Operation Iskra; Leningrad-Novgorod Offensive; Baltic Offensive; Courland Pocket
- Decorations: Honorary Revolutionary Red Banner
- Battle honours: Leningrad; Valga

The 11th Rifle Division (Russian: 11-я стрелковая дивизия; 11 RD) was a military formation (Infantry Division) of the Soviet Union's Red Army. Its personnel were involved in the protection of the demarcation line in Pskov (March – May 1918), defensive battles against the Army of the Southern Front in Krasnov Novohopersk - Borisoglebsk (October - December 1918), against the army and the forces of Estonia, Bulak Balakhovich in Marienburg (April 1919) in defense of Petrograd and as the offensive against Yudenich's troops in Pskov (August 1919) the Luga-Gdov, Yamburg, Narva, Dvina-Rezhitsk directions (October–December 1919 – January–February 1920), the Polish-Soviet war of 1920 (in the July (4–23 July) and Warsaw (July 23 – August 25) operations (fighting in the area of the rivers Narew, Vistula)), in the suppression of the Kronstadt uprising (March 1921) participated in the Soviet-Finnish War (January – March 1940) and World War II.

On 22 June 1941 it was part of 11th Rifle Corps, 8th Army, Baltic Special Military District, which rapidly became Northwestern Front.

During August 1945, the division moved to Dnipropetrovsk and disbanded there by February 1946.

== Russian Civil War ==
By order of the Petrograd Defense region and the Northern Screen on 14 March 1918, the Pskov detachments created to repulse the advance of German troops in February 1918 joined the Luga district and reorganized as part of the Novoselskaya department of the district. Between March and May it guarded the demarcation line in the area of Pskov. The district was renamed the Novgorod sector on 1 April 1918, and on 21 April the formation of the Pskov Infantry Division from units of the Luga District and a cadre from the Novgorod Infantry Division of the Imperial Army. The Pskov Division was renamed the Luga Infantry Division on 17 May and on 9 June the headquarters of the Novgorod Sector merged with that of the Luga Infantry Division. The existence of the latter proved brief, however, as on 31 May it was renamed the 4th Petrograd Infantry Division. The division was transferred to the Yaroslavl Military District in July and then to the Volga Military District in September.

The division joined the 5th Army of the Southern Front in October and fought in defensive battles against the Don Army in the area of Novokhopyorsk and Borisoglebsk until December. By an order of the Southern Front on 21 January 1919, the division was merged with elements of the 11th (the former 1st) Nizhny Novgorod Rifle Division to become the Consolidated Rifle Division. Briefly transferred to the 9th Army in January 1919, the 11th was relocated to the Western Front in February, where it was redesignated as the 11th Rifle Division on 1 March. The 11th fought against Estonian troops and the forces of Stanisław Bułak-Bałachowicz in the area of Marienburg in April, serving as the headquarters of the Marienburg Group of Forces. In May the division became part of the Army of Soviet Latvia, which was redesignated as the 15th Army on 9 June. The division was renamed the 11th Petrograd Rifle Division on 7 August 1919. During that month it fought in the defense of Petrograd and the offensive against the Northwestern Army in the Pskov area, then on the Luga–Gdov, Yamburg, Narva, and Dvinsk–Rezhitsa sectors between October and December and January and February 1920.

The 11th then fought against Polish troops in the area of Lake Ssho, Kamen, and Ushachy, and in the May Offensive. The division fought in the July Offensive during the Polish–Soviet War between 4 and 23 July and then in the Battle of Warsaw, fighting in the area of the Narew and the Vistula, retreating into Belarus after the Red defeat in the Battle of Warsaw. The 15th Army was disbanded in December and the division joined the Petrograd Military District. It fought in the suppression of the Kronstadt rebellion in March 1921 as part of the 7th Army.

== Interwar period ==
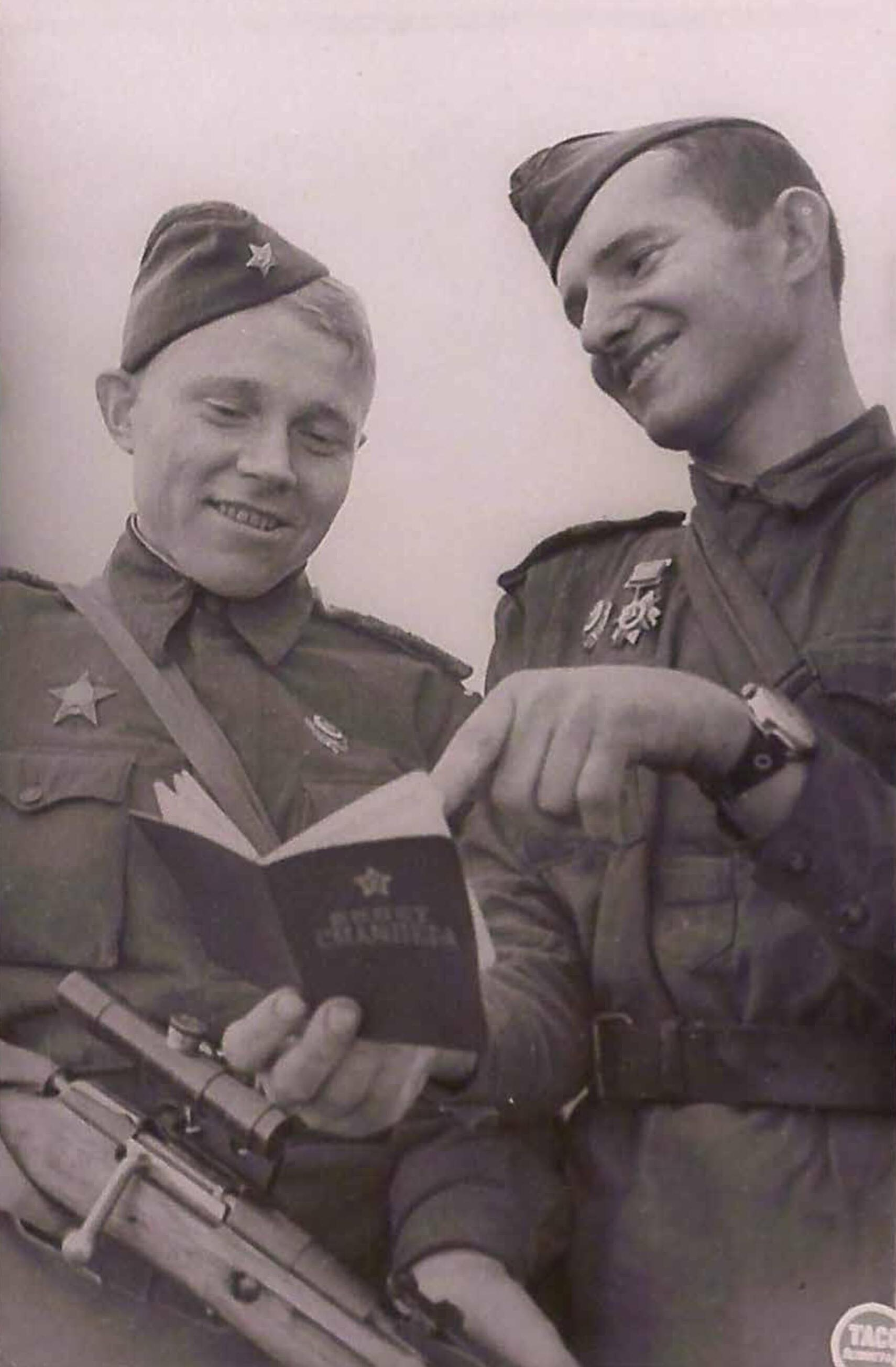
Sergeants Mikhail Makarovich Yakovlev (left) and Matvey Mikhailovich Zvegintsev, snipers of the division's 163rd Rifle Regiment, June 1943

The division's title Petrograd was changed to Leningrad in February 1924 after the city was renamed, becoming the 11th Leningrad Rifle Division. At the same time, the Petrograd Military District became the Leningrad Military District. The division was awarded the Honorary Revolutionary Red Banner in 1928 in recognition of its actions during the Russian Civil War.

The 31st Mechanized Brigade was formed from the 11th Rifle Division's 32nd Volodarsky Rifle Regiment between May and September 1932 as part of the 11th Mechanized Corps in the Leningrad Military District at Stary Petergof near Leningrad. It was commanded by Alexey Skulachenko from its formation until early 1935. It later became the 13th Light Tank Brigade.

The division fought in the Winter War between January and March 1940, and was part of the 65th Rifle Corps of the Baltic Special Military District between August and October of that year.

== Commanders ==
- K.I. Sheremetyev (3 May–9 June 1918)
- B.V. Malyutin (9–13 June 1918)
- Ye.N. Martynov (13 June–3 August 1918)
- A.G. Keppen (3–20 August 1918)
- M.A. Polikarpov (acting, 20 August–2 October 1918)
- M.S. Lyubushkin (2 October 1918–10 April 1919)
- A.G. Skorobogach (10 April–19 June 1919)
- G.G Mangul (19 June–17 July 1919)
- G.M. Rodenko (15–24 July 1919)
- A.G. Natsvalov (24 July 1919–12 February 1920)
- M.K. Simonov (acting, 12 February–19 August 1920)
- V.P. Mariinsky (19 August 1920–15 July 1921)
- Ivan Smolin: 1921–1924
- Semyon Turovsky: 1927–1928
- Kasyan Chaykovsky: 1931–1932
- Fyodor Bakunin: 1938–1939
- Vladimir Ivanovich Shcherbakov: 1941–1942
