= 1st Light Tank Brigade =

The 1st Light Tank Brigade (Russian: 1-я лёгкая танковая бригада (1 лтбр)) was an armored brigade of the Red Army that fought in the Winter War.

The brigade was formed as the 19th Mechanized Brigade in 1934 and was one of the units combined to form the 1st Tank Division in 1940.

== History ==
The 19th Mechanized Brigade was formed in May 1934 in Detskoye Selo, part of the 7th Mechanized Corps of the Leningrad Military District. The brigade was relocated to Pushkin by 1938. The brigade was reorganized as the 1st Light Tank Brigade in 1938. The brigade took part in the Winter War as part of the 10th Tank Corps, which it rejoined on 13 October 1939. After the disbandment of the corps headquarters the brigade was assigned to the 7th Army as a separate tank brigade. By the beginning of the Winter War, the brigade fielded 178 tanks and 23 armored cars. After the end of the Winter War, the brigade returned to Pushkin.

Its headquarters and three tank battalions were used to form the 1st Red Banner Tank Division of the 1st Mechanized Corps, a process completed by the end of July 1940. The division was formed in camps near Strugi Krasnye, and the 1st Tank Battalion of the brigade was one of the units that formed the division's 1st Tank Regiment. The 4th and 8th Tank Battalions of the brigade were among the units forming the division's 2nd Tank Regiment. The 19th Tank Battalion was one of the tank units used to form the 5th Tank Regiment of the 1st Mechanized Corps' 3rd Tank Division.
