= Konstantin Neumann =

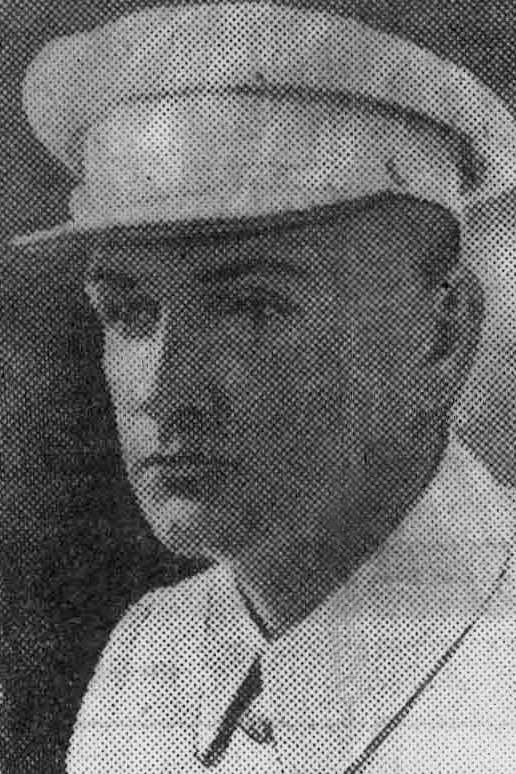
- Born: January 28, 1897; Mitau, Russian Empire
- Died: November 5, 1937 (aged 40)
- Allegiance: Russian Empire; Soviet Union
- Branch: Imperial Russian Army; Soviet Red Army
- Service years: 1918–1937 (Soviet Union)
- Rank: Komkor
- Commands: 35th Rifle Division
- Conflicts: World War I Russian Civil War

Konstantin Avgustovich Neumann (Russian: Константин Августович Нейман; January 28, 1897 – November 5, 1937) was a Soviet revolutionary born in what is now Jelgava, Latvia.

== Russian Civil War ==
Before his military service, Neumann was engaged in writing. He participated in the First World War and, in 1916, graduated from the school of ensigns as an ensign.

In 1917, he joined the Russian Social Democratic Labour Party (RSDLP), and in 1918 became a member of the All-Union Communist Party (Bolsheviks).

During the Civil War, he initially served as the head of the Butyrka Military Commissariat of Moscow.

He was then sent to the Eastern Front, where he was appointed senior adjutant of the headquarters of the Left-Bank Group of the 5th Army. From 22 August 1918, he commanded the 3rd Separate Brigade of the Red Latvian Riflemen subordinate to the commander of the 5th Army. The brigade distinguished itself in the Belebey, Ufa, and Chelyabinsk operations.

During the Petropavlovsk operation, Neumann, with a detachment hastily organized from wagon trains, reached the surrounded 35th Rifle Division and on 20 September 1919 assumed command. After organizing a breakout, he led the division to the Ishim River by 29 October and subsequently participated in the capture of Petropavlovsk, with the 26th and 27th divisions helping to hold the city.

He later commanded other rifle divisions: from 21 April 1920 the Transbaikal, from 26 April 1920 the 2nd Irkutsk, and from mid-May 1920 to August 1921 again the 35th, simultaneously serving as its military commissar.

== Mongolian Revolution ==
Neumann participated with his division in the Mongolian operation, during which he was appointed commander of the expeditionary corps. During the operation, detachments of Baron Roman von Ungern-Sternberg were defeated and the baron himself was captured.

== Interwar period and later life ==
In the interwar period, Neumann commanded the 5th Rifle Division from 1921, the 4th Rifle Corps from 1924, and the 17th Rifle Corps from 1928. He later served as a senior lecturer at the Frunze Military Academy.

From 1930 to 1934, he was in the reserve of the Revolutionary Military Council of the USSR, holding posts including assistant to the head of the Military-Industrial Directorate of the Supreme Economic Council of the USSR and head of the Special Mashtrust of the People's Commissariat of Commerce of the USSR.

In 1934, he was transferred to the reserve of the Red Army and appointed head of the 8th Main Directorate of the People's Commissariat of Commerce of the USSR. On 31 May 1936, he was awarded the rank of corps commander (Komkor).

He was arrested on 21 July 1937, sentenced to death by the Military Collegium of the Supreme Court of the USSR on 5 November 1937, and executed on the same day. He was posthumously rehabilitated on 29 October 1955.

In December 1937, his wife, Marianna Veniaminovna Neumann (born 1894), was declared a family member of a traitor to the Motherland and sentenced to eight years in a labor camp.

| Preceded by | Commander of the 35th Rifle Division; September 28, 1919 – July 13, 1920 | Succeeded by |
| Preceded by | Commander of the 35th Rifle Division; August 29, 1920 – August 19, 1921 | Succeeded by Yan Gaylit |
