= 1st Leningrad Tank Brigade =

- Active: 1941–1944
- Country: Soviet Union
- Branch: Red Army
- Type: Armored
- Engagements: World War II
- Battle honours: Order of the Red Banner; Order of Suvorov, 2nd class

The 1st Leningrad Tank Red Banner and Order of Suvorov Brigade was a tank brigade of the Red Army during World War II. The brigade was in the lines during 30 September 1941 to 8 December 1944.

== History ==
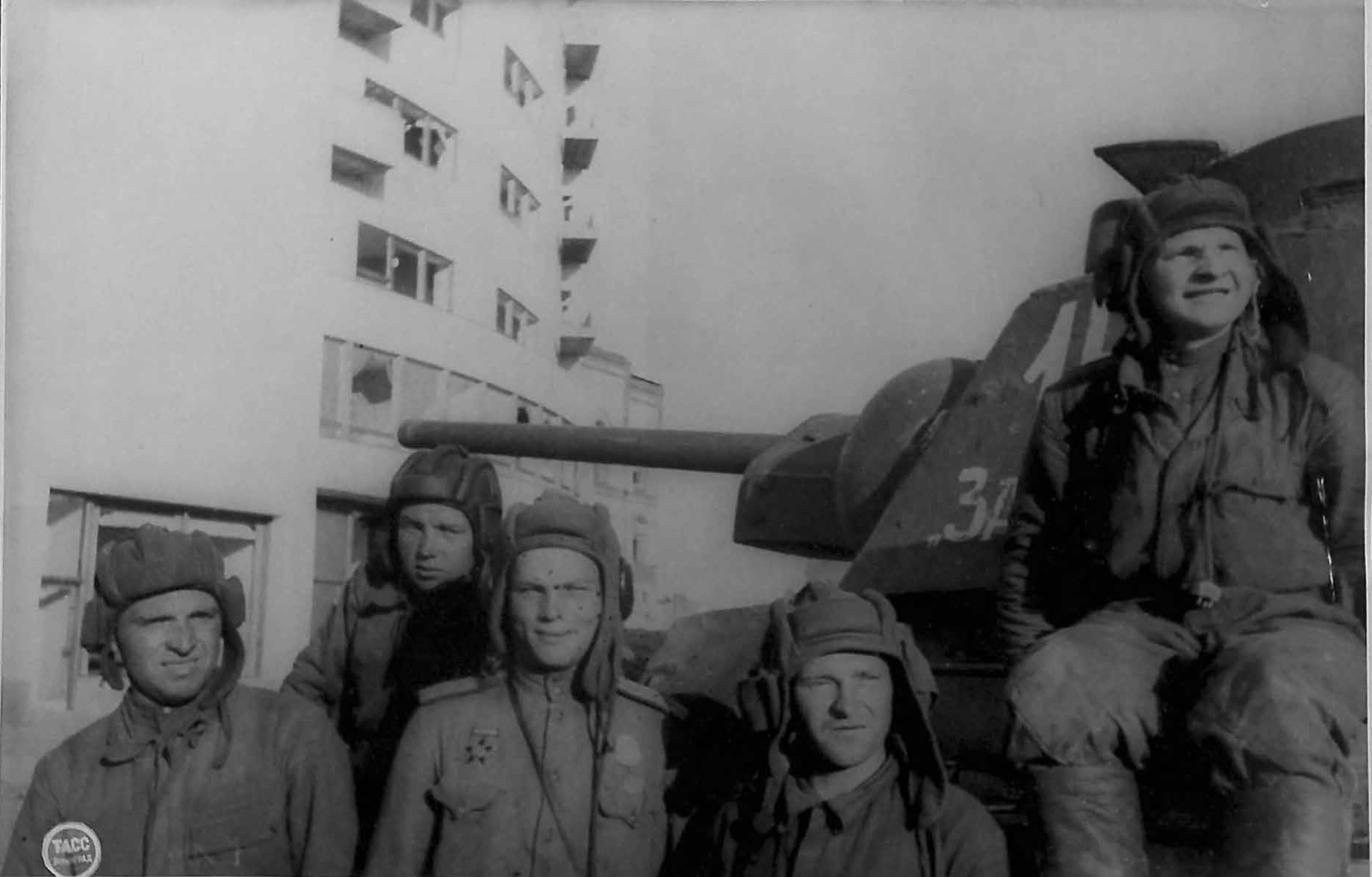
Technician Lieutenant Grigory Petrovich Naumenko's T-34 tank crew from the brigade's 2nd Battalion, one of the first to enter Vyborg on 20 June 1944

The 1st Leningrad Tank Brigade was formed on 26 September 1941 in Leningrad as the 123rd Red Banner Tank Brigade from the disbanded 1st Tank Division (1st formation). When formed, the brigade had 43 KV-1s, 2 T-34s, 26 BA-10s and 3 BA-20s.

From November 1941, the brigade fought near Leningrad, among other part of brigade had fought on the Nevsky Pyatachok. 7 May 1942 123rd Tank Red Banner Brigade was renamed to 1st Leningrad Tank Red Banner Brigade. During 1942-1944 the Brigade proceeded to fight in the vicinity of Leningrad. In June 1944 the brigade fought in the Vyborg–Petrozavodsk Offensive, during which it advanced from Leningrad to Vyborg. During August 1944, the brigade fought in the advance into Estonia.

The brigade was reorganized as the 207th Self-Propelled Artillery Brigade on 8 December.

== Order of battle ==
Since 30 September 1941:

- Staff;
- Staff company;
- 123rd Reconnaissance company;
- 123rd Tank Regiment (two battalions);
- 123rd Motorized rifle-machinegun battalion;
- 123rd Air-defence battalion;
- 123rd Repair company;
- 123rd Motor transport company;
- 123rd Medical platoon

Since 10 February 1942:

- Staff;
- Staff company;
- Reconnaissance company;
- 1st Tank Battalion;
- 2nd Tank Battalion;
- Motorized rifle-machinegun battalion;
- Repair company;
- Motor transport company;
- Medical platoon

Since 10 May 1942:

- Staff;
- Staff company;
- 1st Tank Battalion;
- 2nd Tank Battalion;
- Motorized rifle-machinegun battalion;
- Antiarmour battery;
- Air-defence battery;
- Equipment support company;
- Medical platoon
- Armored self-propelled gun battery

Since 7 July 1944:

- Staff;
- Staff company;
- 1st Tank Battalion;
- 2nd Tank Battalion;
- 3rd Tank Battalion;
- Motorized submachine battalion;
- Air-defence submachine company;
- Equipment support company;
- Medical platoon

== Unit Relation ==
- 10.1941 — 7.1942: Leningrad Front
- 8.1942: 42nd Army, Leningrad Front
- 9.1942: Leningrad Front
- 10.1942 — 1.1943: 42nd Army, Leningrad Front
- 2.1943: 67th Army, Leningrad Front
- 3.1943 — 4.1943: Leningrad Front
- 5.1943 — 1.1944: 42nd Army, Leningrad Front
- 2.1944 — 12.1944: Leningrad Front

== Honors and honorifics ==
- Leningrad (a regional designation, not an honorific)
- Order of Red Banner (inherited from 1st Tank Division)
- Order of Suvorov (22 October 1944, for capture of Pärnu)

== References and notes ==
- Boevoi sostav Sovetskoi armii, chast' 1 (iiun'-dekabr' 1941 goda) [The combat composition of the Soviet Army, part 1 (June–December 1941)]. Moscow: Voroshilov Academy of the General Staff, 1963. Classified secret.
- Boevoi sostav Sovetskoi armii, chast' 2 (ianvar'-dekabr' 1942 goda) [The combat composition of the Soviet Army, part 2 (January–December 1942)].Moscow: Voenizdat, 1966. Classified secret.
- Pokrovsky, Alexander (1956). "Перечень № 7. XXI. Управления танковых бригад бригад" [List (Perechen) No. 7 Part IX. Tank Brigades] (in Russian). Moscow: Voenizdat. Archived from the original on 6 October 2019.
