= 35th Rifle Division =

- Active: April 1919–late 1945
- Country: Soviet Union
- Branch: Red Army
- Type: Infantry
- Size: Division
- Engagements: Russian Civil War Sino-Soviet conflict (1929); World War II: Soviet invasion of Manchuria
- Decorations: Order of the Red Star; Honorary Revolutionary Red Banner
- Battle honours: Siberian

The 35th Rifle Division was a division of the Red Army that fought in the Russian Civil War and the Soviet invasion of Manchuria.

== History ==
=== Russian Civil War ===
The history of the 35th Rifle Division's first formation began in August 1918 when the Kamyshin front troops of the North Caucasus Military District were formed. On 2 September, it was renamed the North Tsaritsyn–Kamyshin front. On 4 October, the front was reorganized into the 1st Kamyshin Rifle Division, part of the 10th Army, fighting on the Southern Front of the Russian Civil War. The division fought in battles against the Don Army north of Tsaritsyn in the area of Burluk and Krasny Yar during the Battle of Tsaritsyn between October and December 1918. Between February and March 1919 the division headquarters, the 2nd Rifle Brigade, and other division units were transferred to the Northern Front, where they became part of the 6th Army. The rest of the division joined the 14th Rifle Division. On the Northern Front, the division fought against White and Allied intervention forces in the area of Plesetsk and Onega. On 23 March, the division staff was given responsibility over the Onega–Arkhangelsk railway direction.

In April, the division headquarters was transferred to the Eastern Front after the remainder of the division was disbanded. On 4 April, the 35th Rifle Division began forming in the Volga Military District at Kazan from parts of the brigades of the poor and railway defense regiments. On 17 April, the arriving 1st Kamyshin Rifle Division headquarters was renamed the headquarters of the 35th Rifle Division. The 35th Division's original headquarters was merged into the 1st Brigade headquarters on 24 April. In June, the division was sent to the front as part of the 5th Separate Army, fighting against Alexander Kolchak's White Army in a campaign known as the Counteroffensive of Eastern Front, which captured the Ural region from the White Army. Between 24 June and 13 July, it fought in the Zlatoust Operation, withdrawing to the Ufa River and advancing towards Zlatoust along the Ay River and the Bol River. The division then withdrew to the line of Kusinsky Zavod and participated in the breakthrough of White defenses in the Zlatoust area.

From 17 July to 4 August, the 35th Division fought in the Chelyabinsk Operation, participating in offensive and defensive battles and the elimination of a White breakthrough on the outskirts of Chelyabinsk. It fought in the Petropavlovsk Operation from 20 August to 4 November. The division covered the southern flank of the 5th Army's strike group as it advanced on Petropavlovsk, and participated in the recapture of the city. From 4 to 16 November, the 35th fought in the Omsk Operation, advancing on Omsk along the Trans-Siberian railway. It then fought in the Novonikolaevsk Operation between 20 November and 16 December, capturing the Medvedovskaya station and cutting the Barnaul–Novonikolayevsk railway line. During the Krasnoyarsk Operation from 18 December to 7 January 1920, the division continued to pursue the retreating White troops east and encircled and captured a large White group in the Balakhtinsky area while attacking Krasnoyarsk from the southwest. On 13 December, the division was awarded the honorific "Siberian".

In May and June 1921, the division defended Soviet territory against Roman von Ungern-Sternberg's incursion from Mongolia, then crossed the border in the Mongolian operation from June to August. In July, the division's 104th Rifle Regiment defeated von Ungern-Sternberg's army at the battle of Lake Gusinoye. The operation ended with the capture and execution of von Ungern-Sternberg, and the 35th returned to Soviet territory.

=== Interwar period ===
The division became part of the East Siberian Military District in September 1921 and soon after transferred to the West Siberian Military District. In June 1922, the 35th was reduced to peacetime strength, with its 104th and 105th Brigades being used to form the 1st Pacific and 36th Rifle Divisions, respectively, on 14 June. The division became part of the Siberian Military District in June 1924. In 1928, it was awarded the Honorary Revolutionary Red Banner. The division was part of the 18th Rifle Corps in 1929. In 1929, the division (alongside the 36th Rifle Division) and its corps became part of the Special Red Banner Far Eastern Army, with which it fought in the 1929 Sino-Soviet conflict over the Chinese Eastern Railway. Between April 1931 and October 1935, the 35th was a territorial unit. In 1938, it became part of the 2nd Red Banner Army.

=== World War II ===
On 22 June 1941, when Operation Barbarossa, the German invasion of the Soviet Union, began, the division was part of the Far Eastern Front. The 35th included the 183rd, 196th, and the 352nd Rifle Regiment, as well as the 119th Light Artillery Regiment and the 177th Howitzer Regiment. In July, the division became part of the newly formed 35th Army, covering the Ussuri River border. In January 1942, the 177th Howitzer Regiment was withdrawn from the division, which was reorganized according to the December 1941 tables of organization. On 30 August 1943, the 35th was awarded the Order of the Red Star in commemoration of its 25th anniversary for "outstanding success in combat and political training, and direct participation in the battles for the Motherland". In August 1945, just before the Soviet invasion of Manchuria, the 35th was part of the 5th Separate Rifle Corps, directly subordinated to the 2nd Far Eastern Front. When the invasion began on 9 August, the division attacked across the Ussuri into the Raohe Fortified Region in the corps' second echelon. It advanced to Boli in eastern Manchuria in eleven days of combat from 9 to 19 August. The division disbanded in the fall of 1945.

== Commanders ==
The following officers are known to have commanded the division:

- Fyodor Kuznetsov (22 April–27 June 1919)
- Leonid Verman (27 June–20 September 1919)
- Nikolay Tatarintsev (acting; 20–28 September 1919)
- Konstantin Neumann (28 September 1919–19 April 1921)
- Yan Gaylit: August-October 1921
- Petr Efimovich Shchetinkin: October-December 1921
- Kasyan Chaykovsky: December 1921-August 1922
- Eduard Lepin (18 August 1924–13 November 1925)
- Anatoly Ivanovich Tarasov (November 1925–1927)
- Kombrig Yulius Martynovich Shtal (8 August 1937–24 February 1938)
- Mikhail Andrianovich Popov (October 1938–July 1939)
- Colonel Fyodor Zakharovich Borisov (17 February 1939–7 February 1942, major general 9 November 1941)
- Colonel Georgy Alekseyevich Vasilyevich (8 February 1942–after 3 September 1945, major general 16 October 1943)
