= Yan Gaylit =

Yan Petrovich Gaylit
- Born: May 25, 1894; Wolmar, Governorate of Livonia, Russian Empire
- Died: August 1, 1938 (aged 44) Moscow, Soviet Union
- Allegiance: Russian Empire; Soviet Union
- Branch: Imperial Russian Army; Soviet Red Army
- Service years: 1915–1917 (Russian Empire); 1918–1937 (Soviet Union)
- Rank: Komkor
- Commands: 35th Rifle Division; Siberian Military District
- Conflicts: World War I Russian Civil War

Yan Petrovich Gaylit (Russian: Ян Петро́вич Га́йлит, Latvian: Jānis Gailītis; May 25, 1894 – August 1, 1938) was a Soviet komkor of Latvian ethnicity. He fought in the Imperial Russian Army in World War I before going over to the Bolsheviks in the subsequent civil war. He was a recipient of the Order of the Red Banner. During the Great Purge, as a part of the so-called "Latvian Operation", Gaylit was arrested by the NKVD on August 15, 1937, and executed the following year. He was rehabilitated in 1956.

== Biography ==
Working as a farm laborer in his youth, he became a land surveyor after attending the Wolmar City School. In 1915 he was drafted into the army, rising from the rank of private to second lieutenant after graduating from the school of warrant officers. He fought in the 1st World War as a member of the 10th Little Russian Grenadier Regiment, second lieutenant.

In 1918 he joined the RCP(b), joining the Red Army in March 1918, In May 1918 he was promoted to commander of the 1st Latvian combat detachment, then in June 1918 became commander of the Penza Group of Forces on the Eastern Front, and in July 1918 served as head of the Penza division. Since In November 1918, he was made chief of staff of the 2nd Infantry Brigade, after which in January 1919, he became commander of the 1st Infantry Brigade of the 26th Infantry Division. He held the. rank of head of the 26th Infantry Division from March 26, 1919 to April 16, 1919 and from November 25, 1919 to October 26, 1921. He was awarded the Order of the Red Banner in 1920.

After the war he pursued higher education. He became the commander of the 10th Rifle Corps in Siberia, then assistant to the commander of the West Siberian Military District. In 1928 he became assistant to the commander of the North Caucasus Military District, and from 1930 deputy chief of the Main Directorate of the Red Army Headquarters.

During 1933-1937 he was commander of the troops of the Siberian Military District. Beginning in 1936 he was a member of the Military Council under the People's Commissar of Defense of the USSR. In May 1937, he was transferred to the post of commander of the Ural Military District.

On August 15, 1937 he was arrested. On August 1, 1938, he was sentenced to death by the Military Collegium of the Supreme Court of the USSR for espionage and participation in a counter-revolutionary organization. Shot on the same day. On November 28, 1956 he was rehabilitated.

== Family ==
His wife, Cleopatra Nikiforovna Gailit (b. 1896), a journalist, was arrested at the end of August 1937 and sentenced in December 1938 to five years in the camps as a member of the family of a traitor to the Motherland. She died in the camp. The children, son Georgy (born 1922) and daughter Valentina (born 1926), were sent to orphanages.

Preceded by Konstantin Neumann	Commander of the 35th Rifle Division; August–October 1921	Succeeded by Petr Efimovich Shchetinkin
Preceded by	Commander of the Siberian Military District; 1923–1924	Succeeded by Robert Eideman
Preceded by Mikhail Lewandowski	Commander of the Siberian Military District; 1933–1937	Succeeded by Pavel Dybenko

== Sources ==
- Латышские стрелки

== Bibliography ==
- Коллектив авторов, главный редактор С. С. Хромов (1983). Гражданская война и военная интервенция в СССР. М.: Советская Энциклопедия. p. 139.
- Черушев Н. С.; Черушев Ю. Н. (2012), Расстрелянная элита РККА (командармы 1-го и 2-го рангов, комкоры, комдивы и им равные): 1937—1941. Биографический словарь [Shot elite of the Red Army (commanders of the 1st and 2nd ranks, comkors, divisional commanders and their equal): 1937-1941. Biographical Dictionary], Moscow: Kuchkovo field; Metropolis [Кучково поле; Мегаполис], pp. 66–67, ISBN 978-5-9950-0217-8
