= Alexander Kravchenko (revolutionary) =

Russian revolutionary, agronomist, and partisan

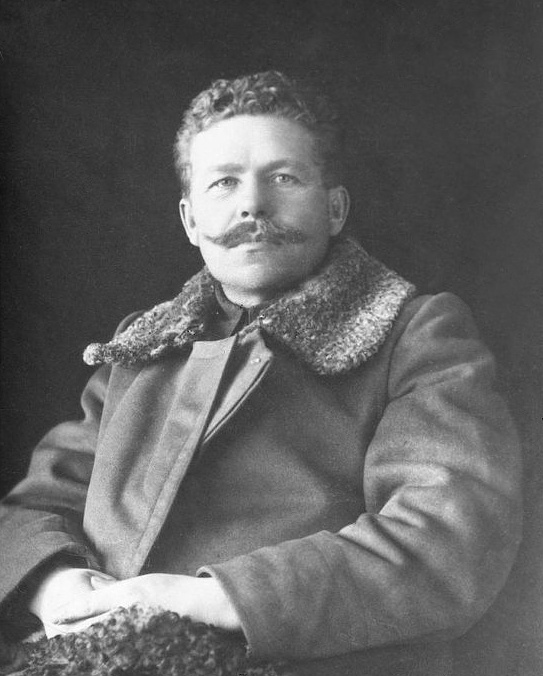
A portrait of Kravchenko taken c. 1918–1920.

Alexander Diomidovich Kravchenko (Russian: Александр Диомидович Кравченко; 3 September 1880 - 21 November 1923) was a Russian revolutionary, agronomist and partisan who fought against Admiral Kolchak's White forces in Siberia in 1919 during the Russian Civil War.

== Biography ==
He was born on 3 September 1880 on a farmstead located within the Ostrogozhsky Uyezd, which was then part of the Russian Empire. Born to a peasant family, Kravchenko was initially a Socialist Revolutionary. Since 1907 he worked as an agronomist in the village of Shushenskoye, in the Minusinsk district in Siberia. After the February Revolution in 1917, Kravchenko served as a member of the Achinsk Soviet. With the advent of Admiral Alexander Kolchak's forces in 1918, Kravchenko established a guerrilla army to combat Kolchak's forces. In April 1919, following a peasant uprising in the Khemchik district, Kravchenko allied with Peter Efimovich Schetinkin's forces. Kravchenko's forces defeated Kolchak's in August and in September Schetinkin's forces took Minusinsk. By November Kravchenko's forces were eight-thousand strong.

In 1920 Kravchenko joined the Russian Communist Party and after the civil war worked in Narkomzeme, and served as Governor of Pyatigorsk in 1922. He died on 21 November 1923 in the city of Rostov-on-Don from pulmonary tuberculosis. His memoirs were published in 1962. Streets were named after him in Abakan, Achinsk, Krasnoyarsk and Minusinsk.
