= Leypyasuo =

Rural locality in Vyborgsky District, Russia

Coordinates: 60°33′25″N 29°09′00″E

Leypyasuo (Russian: Лейпясуо; Finnish: Leipäsuo) is a rural locality (a settlement) in Vyborgsky District of Leningrad Oblast, and a station of the Saint Petersburg–Vyborg railway, located on the Karelian Isthmus. Within the framework of municipal divisions, it is a part of Krasnoselskoye Rural Settlement in Vyborgsky Municipal District.

== History ==
Before the Winter War it was a village of the Muolaa municipality of the Viipuri Province of Finland.
