= 11th Mechanized Corps =

- Active: I Formation: 1932–1938 II Formation: 1941
- Country: Soviet Union
- Branch: Red Army
- Type: Mechanized corps
- Engagements: World War II: Battle of Białystok–Minsk
- Battle honours: Leningrad (1st formation)

Commanders
- Notable commanders: Dmitry Mostovenko

The 11th Mechanized Corps was a mechanized corps of the Red Army, formed twice. The corps was first formed as one of the original two Red Army mechanized corps from the 11th Rifle Division in Leningrad. In 1934 it was transferred to the Transbaikal Military District and in 1938 became the 20th Tank Corps. The corps was reformed in March 1941 in western Belarus. After the German invasion of the Soviet Union, the understrength corps was destroyed in the Battle of Białystok–Minsk.

== History ==
=== First Formation ===
The 11th Mechanized Corps was formed from March to September 1932 from the 11th Rifle Division in Leningrad, one of the first two Red Army mechanized corps. The corps was commanded by division commander Komkor Kasyan Chaykovsky and its chief of staff was Mikhail Bakshi. The 31st Mechanized Brigade was formed from the 32nd Rifle Regiment named for Volodarsky, the 32nd Mechanized Brigade from the 33rd Rifle Regiment named for Voskov, the 33rd Rifle and Machine Gun Brigade from the 31st Rifle Regiment named for Uritsky. The 31st Brigade was equipped with the T-26 and the 32nd Brigade was equipped with the BT-2. Each brigade had a total of 220 tanks. On 1 January 1933 the 83rd Aviation Group was attached the corps, and was later reformed into the Motor-Mechanized Squadron. By March of that year the brigades were based in Tsarskoye Selo, Slutsk, and Stary Peterhof, while the corps headquarters and rear units were still in Leningrad. In December, the 32nd Brigade's 1st Tank Battalion was transferred to the 6th Mechanized Brigade in the Special Red Banner Far Eastern Army. On 16 January 1934 the corps received the honorific "Leningrad", the 31st Brigade received the honorific "named for Uritsky", the 32nd Brigade the honorific "named for Volodarsky", and the 33rd Brigade the honorific "named for Voskov".

On 4 May 1934, the separate anti-aircraft battalion was removed from the corps. As a replacement, an anti-aircraft machine gun battalion was formed. On 1 August, the 33rd Rifle and Machine Gun Brigade was transferred to the newly formed 7th Mechanized Corps. In September, the Motor-Mechanized Squadron was removed from the corps. In 1934, the corps headquarters and the 32nd Brigade redeployed to Borzya. The 31st Brigade stayed in the Leningrad Military District and became part of the 7th Mechanized Corps. On 21 October the T-26 equipped 6th Mechanized Brigade became part of the corps at Chita. The corps headquarters and the 32nd Brigade were deployed to Crossing 76 and the 6th Brigade was at Crossing 77. In February 1935, the reconnaissance, chemical, and anti-aircraft machine gun battalions were disbanded. The mechanized brigades were reequipped with BT tanks. In May 1935 the corps became part of the Transbaikal Military District. In February 1936, Chaykovsky was replaced by district deputy commander Komdiv Yakov Davidovsky. After the signing of a Soviet-Mongolian mutual assistance treaty, units of the corps were deployed to Mongolia in March. On 8 June 1937 Davidovsky was arrested. On 19 August 1937 the 32nd Brigade became part of the 57th Special Rifle Corps as the Special Mechanized Brigade. By 11 September, the 5th Mechanized Corps' 13th Mechanized Brigade became part of the corps at Crossing 76. On 19 March 1938 Komdiv Boris Sheremetov became corps commander. The corps was shortly afterwards converted into the 20th Tank Corps.

=== Second Formation ===
The corps (Military Unit Number 7455) was formed in March 1941 in the Western Special Military District at Vawkavysk, part of the 3rd Army. The corps was commanded by Major General Dmitry Mostovenko. Its deputy commander was Pyotr Makarov, the chief of staff was Colonel Semyon Mukhin, and the artillery commander was Nikolai Mikhailovich Starostin. The corps' 29th Tank Division was formed from the 25th Tank Brigade in Grodno. The 33rd Tank Division was formed from the 15th Tank Brigade (Second Formation) in Sokółka. The 204th Motorized Division was formed from the 9th Motorized Brigade in Vawkavysk. By 22 June, when the German invasion of the Soviet Union began, the corps had 241 tanks, including three KV tanks, 28 T-34s, 44 BT tanks, and 141 T-26 tanks. The corps had less than half of its authorized strength.

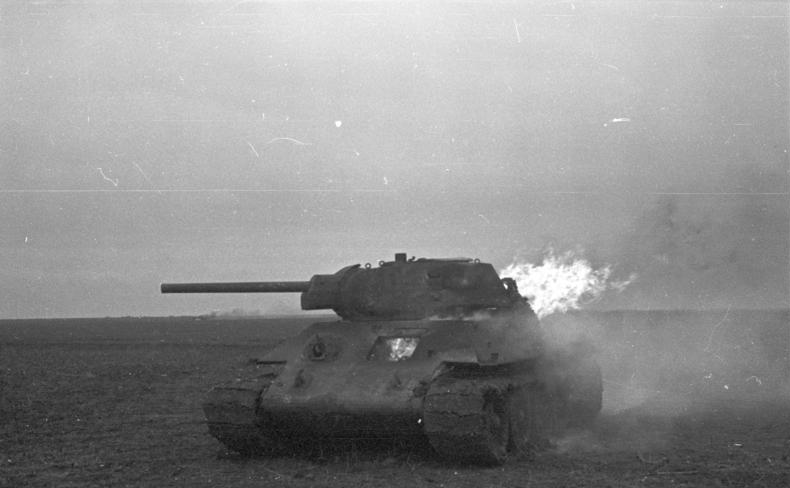
Burning T-34 tank of the type used by the corps

The corps was ordered to counterattack German troops from the 8th Infantry Division advancing near Grodno. Two tank regiments of the 29th Tank Division attacked a kampfgruppe from Infantry-Regiment 84 and assault guns of Sturmgeschutz-Abeiltung 184. Division commander Studnev mistakenly identified the assault guns as tanks and halted the advance, allowing German air support and artillery to disable about half of the two regiments' tanks. The two regiments retreated after four hours. About fifty casualties were suffered by the 8th Infantry Division in the fighting. On 24 June the corps renewed the counterattacks, but was unable to help the 6th Mechanized Corps due to a lack of radio communications. During these attacks, the 11th Mechanized Corps lost a large number of its remaining tanks to air attacks and fuel shortages. On the next day, the 6th and 11th Corps were ordered to retreat east towards Slonim to prevent German forces from cutting the Minsk-Warsaw Highway. The retreat became a rout, which resulted in the loss of substantial numbers of equipment.

Mostovenko was able to restore order and organized the corps into several combat groups by gathering remaining fuel and vehicles. The corps retreated east near Vawkavysk through the forest, running into the German 29th Infantry Division at Zelva and losing several tanks. Crossing the Shchara River on 27 June, the corps ran into German positions at Klepachi and Ozernitsa. The 29th Tank Division's 57th Tank Regiment commander Major Iosif Cheryapkin led ten tanks out of the encirclement while wounded. On 28 June, Mostovenko held a meeting with his subordinates, ordering a retreat in small groups through Novogrudok, Korelichi, and Mir. Mostovenko and 33rd Tank Division commander Mikhail Panov also escaped. Starostin and Makarov were both captured and executed, the former in late 1941 and the latter in October 1943.
