= Fatyh Sharipov =

Fatyh Zaripovich Sharipov
- Born: 20 January 1921; Bairyaki-Tamak village, Bavly district, Tatar ASSR
- Died: 4 June 1996 (aged 75); Saint Peterburg, Russia
- Military career
- Allegiance: Soviet Union; Russia
- Branch: Soviet Army
- Service years: 1940–1951
- Rank: Podpolkovnik
- Commands: tank company of 183rd tank brigade
- Conflicts: World War II; Eastern Front; Battle of Voronezh; Battle of Kursk; Lower Dnieper Offensive
- Awards: Hero of the Soviet Union; Order of Lenin; Order of the Patriotic War, 1st Class; Order of the Red Star (twice)
- Other work: The mathematics teacher at rural school, The teacher in military high schools of the USSR, The teacher of military science in the Leningrad seaworthy school

Fatyh Zaripovich Sharipov (Tatar: Fatyjh Zarif uly Shəripov; 20 January 1921 – 4 June 1996) was a participant of the Second World War, the starshiy Leytenant, the Hero of Soviet Union.

== Biography ==
Sharipov was born in a country family of Tatar nationality. He completed Bugulminsky normal school, then worked some years as the mathematics teacher at a rural school, however in 1940 entered the Kazan tank school which he successfully completed in May 1942, and entered the CPSU the same year. In May 1942, he was assigned as an officer to a unit at the front. He passed a baptism of fire on July 25, 1942 as the commander of a tank company of 183rd tank brigade of 10th Tank Corps, 40th Army of the Voronezh Front. Participated in the Battle of Kursk.

== Heroism ==
On the night of 23 September 1943 Sharipov's tank company proceeded to Dneeper around the village of Balyk in the Kagarlyksky region of the Kiev Oblast and fought to occupy the area. Expecting the arrival of the basic forces in three days, a company under Sharipov's command repulsed German counterattacks. During the course of action, a company under Sharipov's command seized and kept important heights until the arrival of the basic forces.

Указом Президиума Верховного Совета СССР от 10 января 1944 года за умелые действия при переправе через Днепр, захват плацдарма, за мужество, смелость и героизм, старшему лейтенанту Шарипову Фатыху Зариповичу присвоено звание Героя Советского Союза с вручением ордена Ленина и медали «Золотая Звезда» (№ 2360)

The decree of Presidium of the Supreme body of the USSR from January 10, 1944 for skillful actions at a crossing through Dnieper, base capture, for courage, boldness and heroism, to the starshiy leytenant Sharipov Fatyhu Zaripovichu appropriates a rank of the Hero of Soviet Union with delivery of an award of the Order of Lenin and a medal «Gold Star» (№ 2360)

== After the war ==
Upon the conclusion of the war, in 1946 has ended the Leningrad higher school of the armored and mechanized armies then has returned to teaching activity and began to teach military science in the higher military educational institutions. In 1951 the Podpolkovnik has retired in a rank. Later Sharipov moved the city of Leningrad where long time worked in the Leningrad seaworthy school on various posts. He died in June 1996 in Saint Petersburg where has been buried.
