= Kasyan Chaykovsky =

Soviet military officer and Red Army Komkor

- Native name: Касьян Александрович Чайковский
- Born: February 1893; Tambov, Russian Empire
- Died: 23 April 1938 (aged 45) Chita, Soviet Union
- Allegiance: Russian Empire; Soviet Union
- Branch: Imperial Russian Army; Red Army
- Service years: 1914–1917; 1918–1937
- Rank: Komkor
- Commands: 35th Rifle Division; 5th Army; 12th Rifle Corps; 11th Rifle Division; 11th Mechanized Corps
- Conflicts: First Balkan War; World War I; Russian Civil War
- Awards: Order of the Red Banner

Kasyan Alexandrovich Chaykovsky (Russian: Касьян Александрович Чайковский; February 1893 – 23 April 1938) was a Soviet military officer and Red Army Komkor. Born in the family of a lawyer, Chaykovsky became a law student at Moscow State University. He volunteered for the First Balkan War and fought with the Serbian Army. Chaykovsky was wounded twice and returned to the university in January 1913. He volunteered for the Imperial Russian Army after World War I began and became an officer. He was seriously wounded and captured by German troops in 1915. Chaykovsky remained in a POW camp until October 1918, when he joined the Red Army. He became a commissar and then a VOHR officer in the Russian Civil War.

After the end of the war, he led the 35th Rifle Division, was acting commander of the 5th Army, and commanded the 12th Rifle Corps. Chaykovsky led a cavalry brigade in the suppression of the August Uprising. He taught at the Frunze Military Academy from 1929 to 1931, when he became commander of the 11th Rifle Division. The division became the 11th Mechanized Corps a year later with Chaykovsky still commanding. In February 1936 he became deputy head of the 2nd Department (Organization and Mobilization) of the Red Army General Staff. Three months later Chaykovsky became deputy head of combat training. He was arrested during the Great Purge and died in prison. He was posthumously pardoned in 1956.

== Early life and World War I ==
Chaykovsky was born in February 1893 in Tambov in the family of a lawyer of the nobility. In 1911, he graduated from a Gymnasium in Moscow and became a law student at Moscow State University. In 1912, he volunteered for the First Balkan War and fought with the Serbian Army. Chaykovsky was wounded twice and returned to Moscow in January 1913. He continued his studies at the university. In July 1914, Chaykovsky volunteered for the Russian Imperial Army as a private. He graduated from an accelerated course at a military school in January 1915 and became an officer. He fought in World War I, serving with the 211th Nikolskoye Infantry Regiment as a Praporshchik and company commander. Chaykovsky was wounded five times and concussed once. In February 1915 he was seriously wounded and captured by German troops. He attempted to escape six times and was repatriated in October 1918.

== Russian Civil War ==
Chaykovsky served in the Red Army from December 1918. He became chief of the prisoners and refugees echelon and commissar of the military-sanitary institutions on the Alexandrovsky Railway. In January 1919, he became a board member, head of supply, and chairman of the Smolensk Provincial Committee of Prisoners and Refugees. Chaykovsky became a Russian Communist Party (b) member in February 1919. In July, he became commissar of the 28th Separate Rifle Battalion and then the 41st Separate Rifle Brigade. In October, he became the assistant chief and then chief of the Western Sector of the Internal Security Forces (VOHR). Chaykovsky held this position until August 1920.

== Interwar years and death ==
In January 1921, Chaykovsky became head of the combat troops in Tambov Governorate. In August 1921, he became assistant commander of troops in the Minsk region. In 1921, Chaykovsky was awarded the Order of the Red Banner. Between October 1921 and January 1923, he led the 35th Rifle Division. Chaykovsky became acting commander of the 5th Army and the East Siberian Military District in August 1922. He led the 12th Rifle Corps between January and September 1923. He studied at the Higher Academic Courses at the Military Academy of the Red Army from September 1923. Between July and September 1924 Chaykovsky led the 2nd Separate Caucasian Cavalry Brigade in the suppression of the August Uprising. In October he became inspector of cavalry of the Red Banner Caucasus Army. Chaykovsky was placed at the disposal of the Main Directorate of the Red Army in November 1926. He went to America to buy horses in 1928. From January 1929 he was an Adjunct professor at the Frunze Military Academy. At the same time, he was acting head of the training department and assistant chief of the Evening Military Academy of the Red Army. In June 1931 he became the deputy head of the Department of Mechanization and Motorization at the academy.

In July 1931, Chaykovsky was appointed commander of the 11th Rifle Division in the Leningrad Military District. In 1932, the 11th Mechanized Corps was formed from the division. In the fall of 1934, the corps was relocated to the Transbaikal Group. On 20 November 1935, he was promoted to Komkor. In February 1936, he became deputy head of the 2nd department (Organization and Mobilization) of the General Staff of the Red Army. In April 1936, he was appointed deputy head of Red Army combat training. Chaykovsky was arrested on 21 May 1937 at his dacha in the Pokrovskoye-Streshnevo District after suffering a heart attack, during the Great Purge. He died during the investigation at the Chita prison hospital on 23 April 1938. He was posthumously pardoned on 24 September 1956.
