= Snegiryovka, Leningrad Oblast =

Village in Leningrad Oblast, Russia

Snegiryovka Снегирёвка
- Village
- Location within Leningrad Oblast Location within Russia
- Coordinates: 60°33′14″N 30°17′48″E
- Country: Russia
- Region: Leningrad Oblast
- District: Priozersky District
- Time zone: UTC+3:00

Snegiryovka (before 1948 Suur-Porkku, Suopporku) is a village in Sosnovsky selsoviet of Priozersky District, Leningrad Oblast.

== Names ==
The village was renamed Snigeryovka by decision of a mass meeting of the kolkhoz imeni Kirova. The renaming was confirmed by a decree of the Presidium of the Supreme Soviet of the Russian Soviet Federative Socialist Republic on 13 January 1949.

== History ==
In 1918, a school with room for 100 students opened.

Until 1939, the village of Suur-Porkku was part of Rautu parish in Viipuri Province of Finland, and there were 43 houses in the village. The population of the village numbered 153 people. It had its own sawmill, mill and store. The residents of the village engaged in agriculture. In the last years before the Winter War there were good harvests of sugar beets. Beyond agriculture, the village residents engaged in trade and animal husbandry. There was a forge in the village.
