= Zamostye, Priozersky District =

Rural locality in Priozersky District, Russia

Coordinates: 60°31′52″N 30°23′10″E

Zamostye (Russian: Замостье, before 1948 Riikola) is a village in Zaporozhskoye village council of Priozersky District, Leningrad Oblast.

The toponym Riikola originated from the Russian name Grigory. The village was officially renamed Zamostye on 13 January 1949.
