= 10th Tank Corps =

Tank corps of the Soviet military

- Active: 1st formation: 1938–1940; 2nd formation: 1942–1945
- Country: Soviet Union
- Branch: Red Army
- Type: Armor
- Engagements: World War II: Operation Gallop; Battle of Kursk; Belgorod-Kharkov Offensive Operation; Battle of the Dnieper; Battle of Kiev (1943); East Prussian Offensive
- Decorations: Order of Suvorov 2nd class
- Battle honours: Dnieper

Commanders
- Notable commanders: Vasily Mikhailovich Alexeyev; Alexey Panfilov; Matvey Shaposhnikov

The 10th Tank Corps was a tank corps of the Red Army, formed twice.

== First Formation ==
In May–June 1938, the 7th Mechanized Corps headquarters was relocated from Novy Petergof to Luga and converted into the 10th Tank Corps when the Red Army mechanized forces transitioned from a mechanized corps structure to a tank corps structure. On 4 August 1938, the 107th Separate Air Liaison Flight was formed as part of the corps at Luga. On 27 September 1939, the corps was relocated to the Pskov area on the Estonian border, to back up threats of force against that country. On 2 October it was moved to the Latvian border to threaten Latvia as well. Both of these movements were made to force the two Baltic states into signing the Soviet–Estonian Mutual Assistance Treaty and the Soviet–Latvian Mutual Assistance Treaty, respectively, which established Soviet military bases on the territory of both countries. On 10 October, the 18th Light Tank Brigade was transferred to another unit and replaced by the 1st Light Tank Brigade. The corps' other brigades were the 13th Light Tank Brigade and the 15th Motor Rifle and Machine Gun Brigade.

On 13 October the corps was transferred back to the Leningrad Military District from the 8th Army and returned to Luga. By 30 November, in preparation for the Winter War, the Soviet attack on Finland, the 10th was relocated to the Finnish border as part of the 7th Army. On 30 November, the corps crossed the border at the beginning of the invasion, with its headquarters in the Korkiamyaki area, then at Rautu and Liipua. Between 13 and 16 December the 10th Tank Corps was transferred to advance towards Vyborg, concentrating in the Baboshino area. Its units were pulled out of combat and moved to Baboshin, with the headquarters at Tomilla by 20 December.

The Red Army command considered the performance of the large tank corps to be unsatisfactory and ordered all of them, including the 10th, disbanded in January 1940 by an order dated 17 January. The corps headquarters was moved to Kingisepp to be used to form an army group under the command of Dmitry Pavlov.

== Second Formation ==
The corps was reformed in April 1942 and was part of Steppe Front for the Battle of Kursk. Fatyh Zaripovich Sharipov appears to have won the Hero of the Soviet Union while operating with the corps.

10th Tank Corps was subsequently assigned to the 5th Guards Tank Army, but by April 1945 during the Battle of Berlin, the 10th Tank Corps was part of the Reserve of the Supreme High Command (RVGK). It comprised the 178th, 183rd, and 186th Tank Brigades, and the 11th Motor Rifle Brigade.

It should not be confused with 30th Tank Corps, which became 10th Guards Tank Corps.

Postwar it became the 10th Tank Division. On 30 April 1957, it became the 34th Heavy Tank Division. In March 1965, it became the 34th Tank Division. On 20 March 1992, it was taken over by Belarus. The division became the 34th Weapons and Equipment Storage Base, part of North Western Operational Command.
