= 1st Tank Division (Soviet Union) =

Tank division of the Soviet military

1st Tank Division (July 1940 – September 1941) 1st Insterburgskaya Red Banner Tank Division (July 1945 – 2008)
- Active: 1940–1941; 1942–1944; 1945–2008
- Country: Soviet Union
- Branch: Red Army / Soviet Army
- Type: Armoured
- Size: Division
- Part of: 11th Guards Army (1945–1993)
- Garrison/HQ: First: Leningrad; Last: Kaliningrad

The 1st Tank Division was a Division sized unit of the Red Army that existed from 1940–42. It was later reformed, from a separate formation, with a different lineage. Within the Soviet Ground Forces it existed as a second line ready division from 1945–2008, at Kaliningrad in the Baltic Military District.

== First formation ==
The division was first formed in July 1940 and had the following structure:

- Headquarters under Colonel Vasiliy Ivanovich Ivanov
  - 1st Tank Regiment
  - 2nd Tank Regiment
  - 1st Motorized Rifle Regiment
  - 1st Motorized Howitzer Regiment
  - 1st Reconnaissance Battalion
  - 1st Motorized Anti-Aircraft Artillery Battalion
  - 1st Motorized Pontoon Battalion
  - 63rd Field Post Office
  - 204th State Bank Field Officer

When under the control of the Leningrad Military District the division was assigned to the 1st Mechanized Corps where it remained until its disbandment. When the division was disbanded the division was broken up and used to create the new 122nd, 123rd, and 124th Tank Brigades. Before disbandment the division contained the following units:

- Headquarters under Major General Yakov Grigorevich Kreizer
  - 1st Tank Regiment
  - 2nd Tank Regiment
  - 1st Howitzer Artillery Regiment
  - 1st Separate Anti-Aircraft Artillery Battalion
  - 1st Reconnaissance Battalion
  - 1st Pontoon Battalion
  - 1st Signals Battalion
  - 1st Field Hospital Battalion
  - 1st Motor Transport Battalion
  - 1st Maintenance (Repair and Recovery) Battalion
  - 1st Chemical Defense Company
  - 1st Field Bakery
  - 63rd Field Post Station
  - 204th Field Ticket Officer of the State Bank

== Second formation ==
The Division was re-formed for its second time on 18 August 1941 from the 1st Motor Rifle Division. The division had the following formation upon creation:

- Headquarters
  - 12th Tank Regiment
  - 6th Motorized Rifle Regiment
  - 175th Motorized Rifle Regiment
  - 13th Artillery Regiment
  - 300th Separate Anti-Aircraft Artillery Battalion
  - Mortar Battalion
  - 93rd Reconnaissance Battalion
  - 28th Separate Signals Battalion
  - 87th Medical Battalion
  - 45th Motor Transport Battalion
  - 54th Repair and Recovery Company
  - 22nd Engineer Company
  - 30th Field Bakery
  - 218th Field Post Station
  - 63rd Field Ticket Officer of the State Bank

== Insterburgskaya Tank Division ==
The division was established 4 July 1945 in Kaliningrad, Kaliningrad Oblast, from the 1st Tank Corps.

After the end of the war the division was stationed in Kaliningrad and had the following structure:

- Headquarters
  - 89th Tank Regiment
  - 117th Tank Regiment
  - 159th Tank Regiment
  - 44th Motorized Rifle Regiment
  - 98th Guards Heavy Self-Propelled Artillery Regiment
  - 108th Mortar Regiment
  - 1720th Anti-Aircraft Artillery Regiment
  - Independent Howitzer Artillery Battalion
  - 10th Independent Guards Mortar Battalion
  - 86th Independent Motorcycle Battalion
  - 183rd Independent Sapper Battalion
  - 767th Independent Signals Battalion
  - 190th Independent Medical Battalion
  - Independent Auto-Transport Battalion
  - 72nd Independent Tank Training Battalion

== Early 1950s ==
After force reductions in early 1953, Soviet divisions were re-organized and most were drawn down to just cadre brigades, including the 1st Tank Division. The reforms mostly were because of the draw-down after the end of the Second World War and the changes were mostly organized by Nikita Khrushchev and his cabinet. The "division" had the following structure after the re-forms:

- Headquarters at Kaliningrad
  - 89th Tank Regiment
  - 117th Tank Regiment
  - 159th Tank Regiment
  - 127th Mechanized Rifle Regiment
  - 886th Artillery Regiment
  - 98th Guards Heavy Self-Propelled Artillery Regiment
  - 1720th Anti-Aircraft Artillery Regiment (1955 re-named to 1043rd Anti-Aircraft Artillery Regiment)
  - 10th Independent Guards Mortar Battalion
  - 86th Independent Reconnaissance Battalion
  - 183rd Independent Sapper Battalion
  - 767th Independent Signals Battalion
  - 190th Independent Medical Battalion
  - Independent Auto-Transport Battalion
  - Independent Chemical Defense Company
  - 72nd Independent Tank Training Battalion

Later in June 1957 the division was re-organized yet again including:

- 159th Tank Regiment - disbanded
- 98th Guards Heavy Self-Propelled Artillery Regiment – re-named 98th Guards Heavy Tank Regiment
- 127th Mechanized Rifle Regiment – renamed to 290th Motorized Rifle Regiment

Just three years later in 1960, the 72nd Independent Tank Training Battalion was disbanded.

== Structure in 1990 ==
After many years the Soviet Ground Forces had a major re-fit under Dmitry Yazov including the 1st Tank Division. In 1990 the division consisted of the following just before its major re-organization:

- Headquarters - Kaliningrad
  - 89th Tank Regiment - Kornevo
  - 117th Tank Regiment - Kornevo
  - 501st Independent Guard and Service Battalion - Mamonovo
  - 79th Guards Motorized Rifle Regiment - Kaliningrad
  - 886th Self-Propelled Artillery Regiment - Kaliningrad
  - 1043rd Anti-Aircraft Missile Regiment - Kaliningrad
  - 79th Independent Reconnaissance Battalion - Kornevo
  - 218th Independent Missile Battalion - Kaliningrad
  - 183rd Independent Engineer-Sapper Battalion - Kaliningrad
  - 767th Independent Communications Battalion - Kaliningrad
  - 140th Independent Maintenance Battalion - Kaliningrad
  - Independent Chemical Defense Company - Kaliningrad
  - 190th Independent Medical Battalion - Kaliningrad
  - 1037th Independent Supply Battalion - Kaliningrad

In 1993 the 1st Tank Division was reduced in status to the 2nd Independent Tank Brigade. Finally, in 1998 the brigade was re-organized and became the 385th Weapons and Equipment Storage Base. The base was finally disbanded in 2008 as a result of the 2008 Russian military reform.
