= Ściborzyce =

Ściborzyce can refer to following locations in Poland:

- Ściborzyce, Lesser Poland Voivodeship
- Ściborzyce Małe
- Ściborzyce Wielkie
