= Sudice =

Sudice may refer to places in the Czech Republic:

- Sudice (Blansko District), a municipality and village in the South Moravian Region
- Sudice (Opava District), a municipality and village in the Moravian-Silesian Region
- Sudice (Třebíč District), a municipality and village in the Vysočina Region

== See also ==
- Deities and fairies of fate in Slavic mythology
