= Hněvošice =

- Municipality
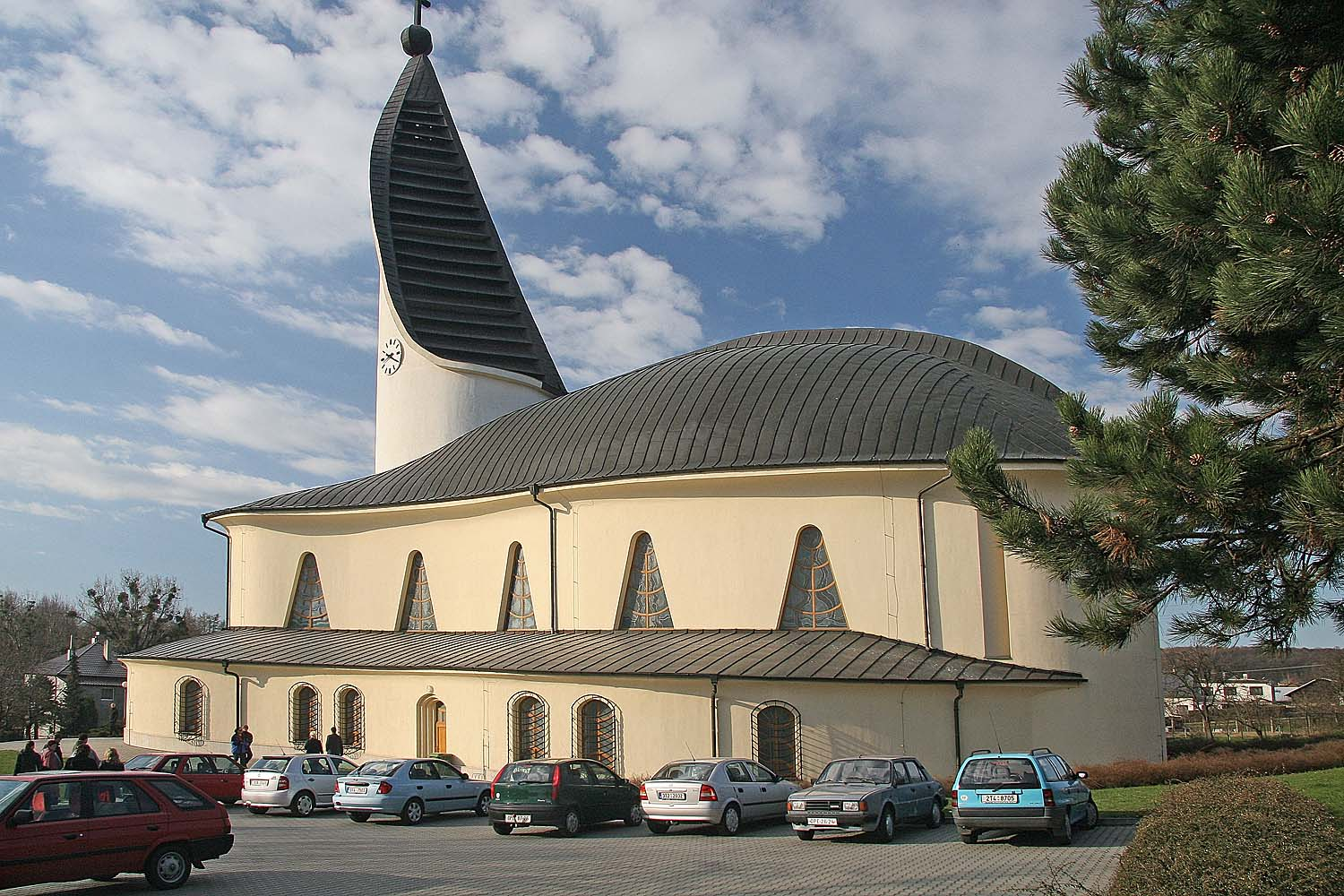
- Church of Christ the Good Shepherd

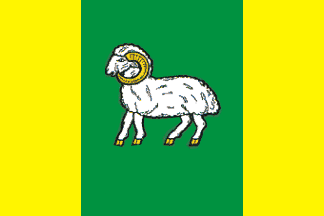
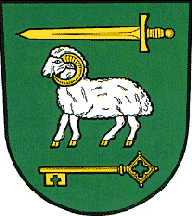
- Flag Coat of arms

- Location in the Czech Republic
- Coordinates: 50°0′11″N 18°0′30″E
- Country: Czech Republic
- Region: Moravian-Silesian
- District: Opava
- First mentioned: 1349

Area
  - Total: 6.16 km^{2} (2.38 sq mi)
- Elevation: 253 m (830 ft)

Population (2026-01-01)
  - Total: 987
  - Density: 160/km^{2} (415/sq mi)
- Time zone: UTC+1 (CET)
  - Summer (DST): UTC+2 (CEST)
- Postal code: 747 35
- Website: www.hnevosice.cz

Hněvošice (German: Schreibersdorf, Polish: Gniewoszyce) is a municipality and village in Opava District in the Moravian-Silesian Region of the Czech Republic. It has about 1,000 inhabitants. It is part of the historic Hlučín Region.

== Etymology ==
The name is probably derived from the personal name Hněvoš. The German name originated in 1630. After 1736, the folk name Něboščice also appeared.

== Geography ==
Hněvošice is located about 9 kilometres (6 mi) northeast of Opava, on the border with Poland. It lies in the Opava Hilly Land. The highest point is at 315 m (1,033 ft) above sea level.

The forest in the western part of the municipality is protected as the Hněvošický háj Nature Reserve with an area of 70.7 ha (175 acres).

== History ==
The first written mention of Hněvošice is from 1288, when the brothers Trutvín and Vítek were the owners of Hněvošice. They built a courtyard and a fortress. The courtyard was destroyed by fire at the beginning of the 18th century.

From 1742 to 1918, after Empress Maria Theresa had been defeated, the village belonged to Prussia. In 1920, the municipality was annexed to Czechoslovakia and incorporated into the district of Hlučín. In 1928, it was changed to the Opava District.

== Demographics ==
Historical population

Year	Pop.	±%
1869	528	—
1880	555	+5.1%
1890	580	+4.5%
1900	663	+14.3%
1910	621	−6.3%

Year	Pop.	±%
1921	629	+1.3%
1930	694	+10.3%
1950	658	−5.2%
1961	875	+33.0%
1970	842	−3.8%

Year	Pop.	±%
1980	873	+3.7%
1991	957	+9.6%
2001	1,024	+7.0%
2011	1,000	−2.3%
2021	961	−3.9%

Source: Censuses

== Transport ==
On the Czech–Polish border is the road border crossing Hněvošice / Ściborzyce Wielkie. The I/46 road from Opava to the Czech-Polish border in Sudice runs through Hněvošice.

== Sights ==
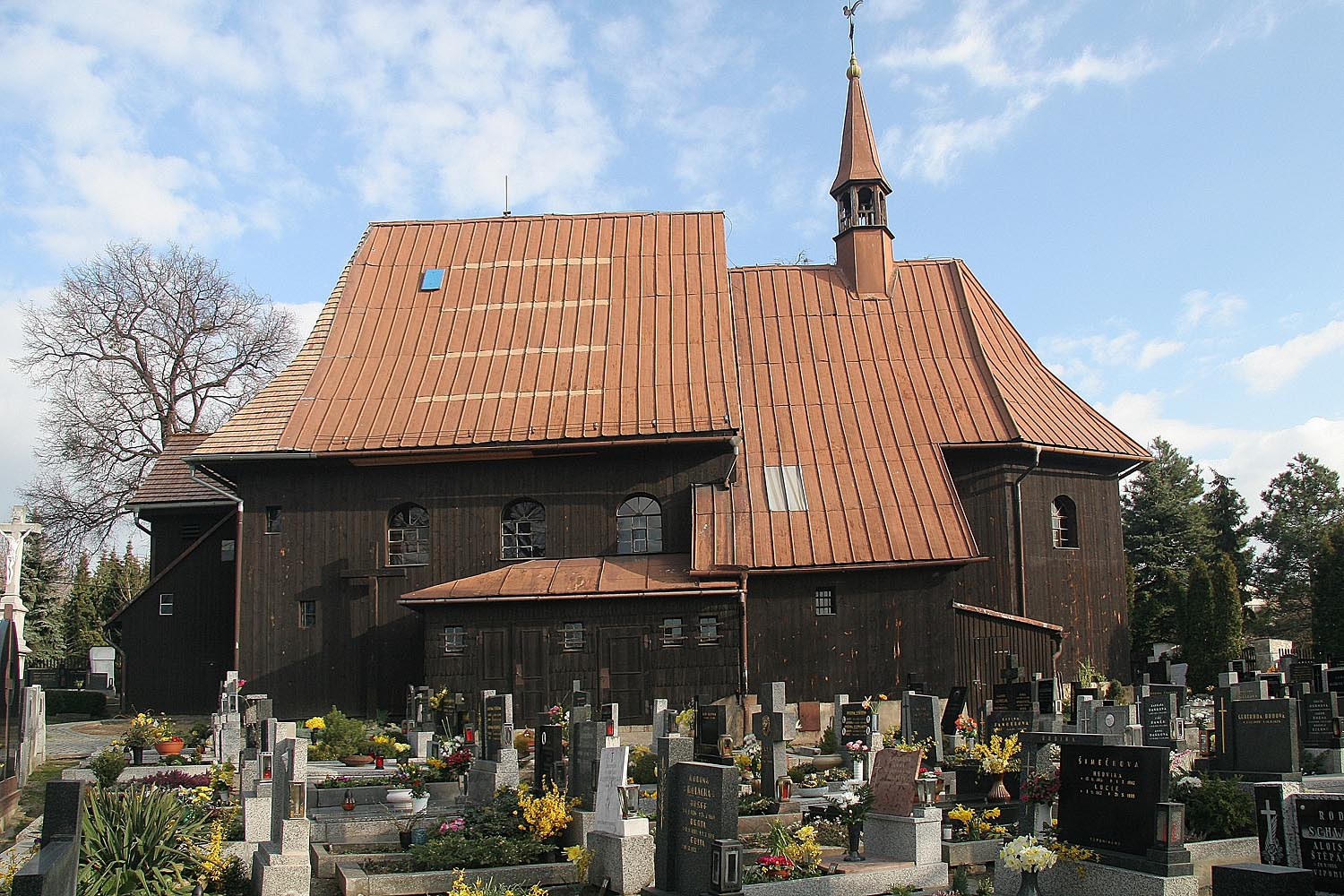
Church of Saints Peter and Paul

The most valuable building is the Church of Saints Peter and Paul. It is the only still standing wooden church in the Hlučín Region and has been protected as a cultural monument. It has preserved original interior. The church was built in the Baroque style in 1730 and restored in 1842. It was funded by Johann Rudolf Žarovský from Žarov.

A landmark is the Church of Christ the Good Shepherd. It is a modern church, built in 1996.
