= 310th Division =

310th Division may refer to:

- 310th Rifle Division, Soviet Union
- 310th Air Division, United States

== See also ==
- List of military divisions by number
