= Michał Stachowicz =

Polish painter and graphic artist

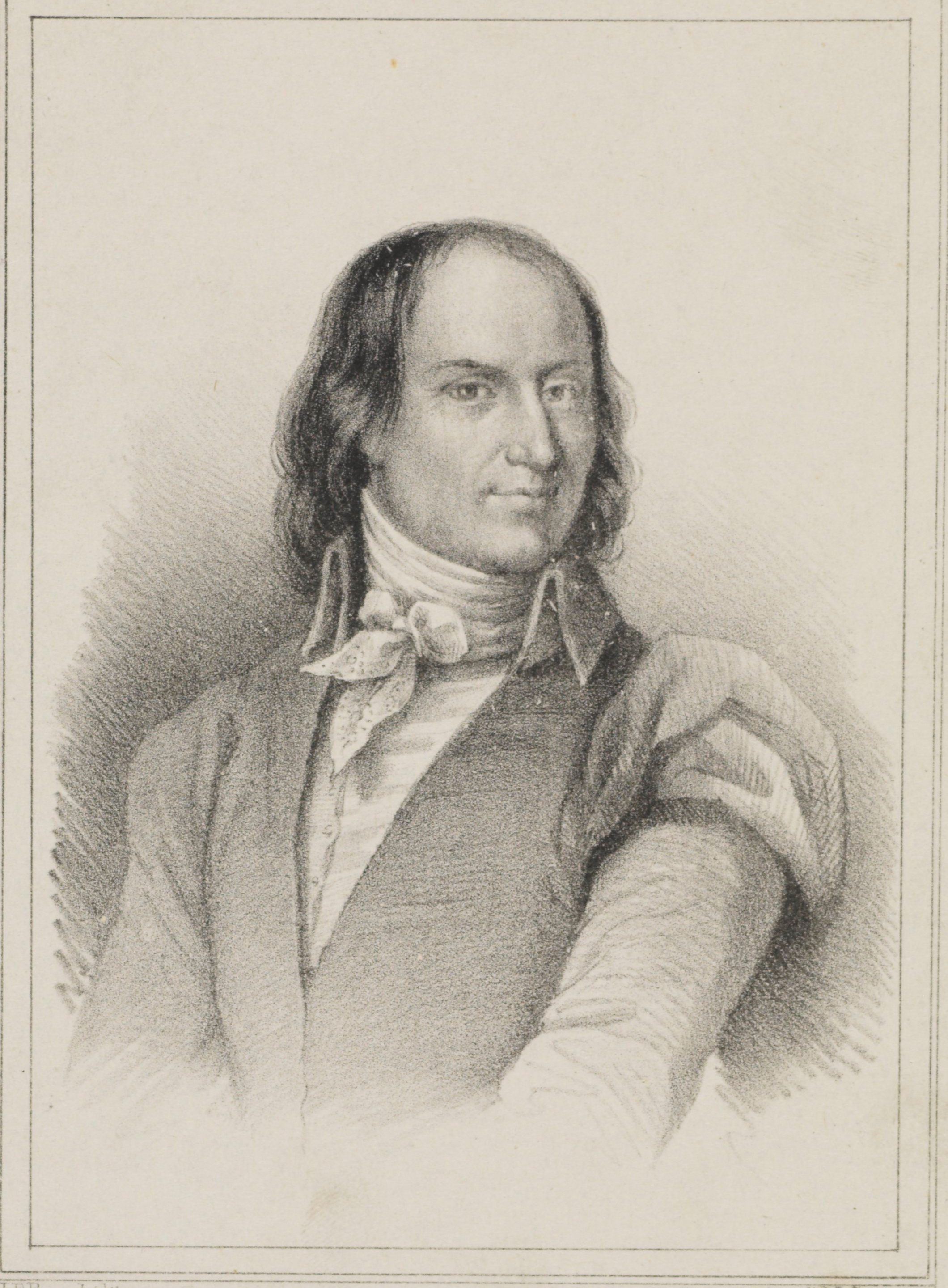
Michał Stachowicz by an unknown artist, after a self-portrait.

Michał Stachowicz (14 August 1768, in Kraków – 26 March 1825, in Kraków) was a Polish painter and graphic artist in the Romantic style.

== Biography ==
His father was a printer, bookbinder and bookseller. In 1782, he was enrolled in classes at the Painter's Guild, where he studied with Franciszek Ignacy Molitor, a Czech painter working at the Royal Court, and Kazimierz Mołodziński (?–1795), a religious painter. In 1787, he became a Master in the guild. From 1817 until his death, he was a teacher at Saint Barbara's gymnasium and, for many years, was a member of the Kraków Scientific Society. He died at his home and was buried at Rakowicki Cemetery.

In 1816, he received a major commission from Bishop Jan Paweł Woronicz to do wall paintings at the Bishop's Palace, which took two years to complete. Only thirty-two years later, they were destroyed by a fire. In 1820, he was given another major commission from the architect, Sebastian Sierakowski, to paint a mural at the Collegium Maius depicting the history of the Jagiellonian University.

His best known works depicted contemporary historical events, many of which he witnessed, such as "Kościuszko's Oath on the Market Square" and "The Entrance of Prince Józef Poniatowski into Kraków". He also did genre scenes, portraits, and religious paintings; notably the Stations of the Cross at the Church of St. Casimir the Prince and images for two side altars at the church in Jangrot. He also worked as a lithographer and illustrated the Monumenta regum Poloniae Cracoviensia (Tombs of the Kings of Poland in Kraków).

== Selected paintings ==
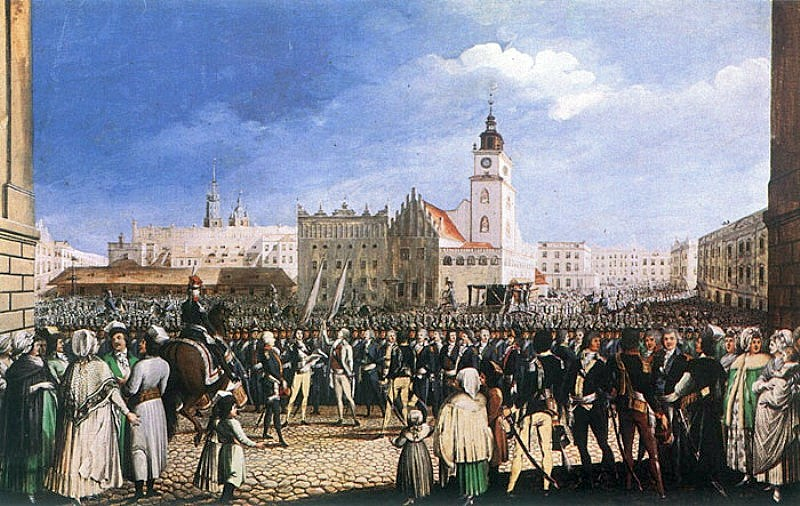
Kościuszko's Oath
at the Market Square

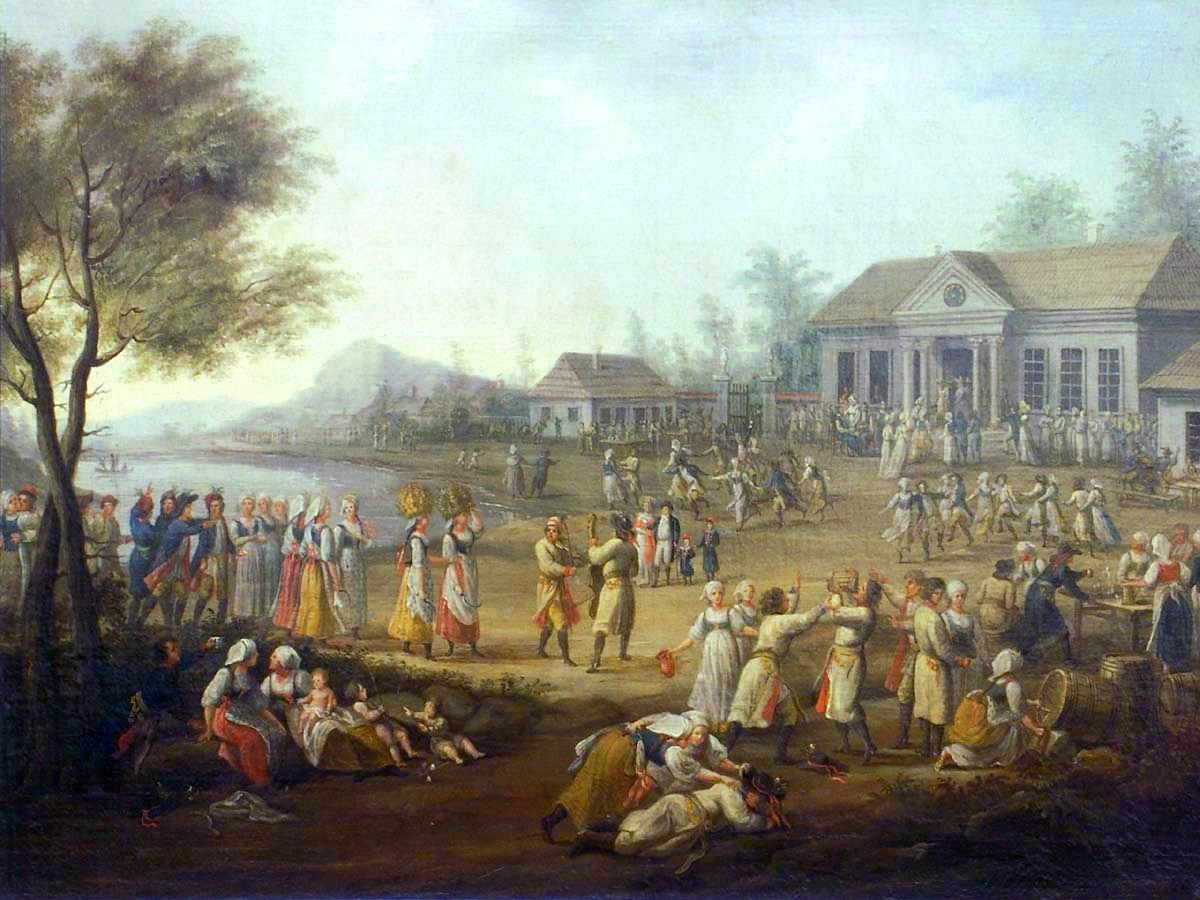
Dożynki

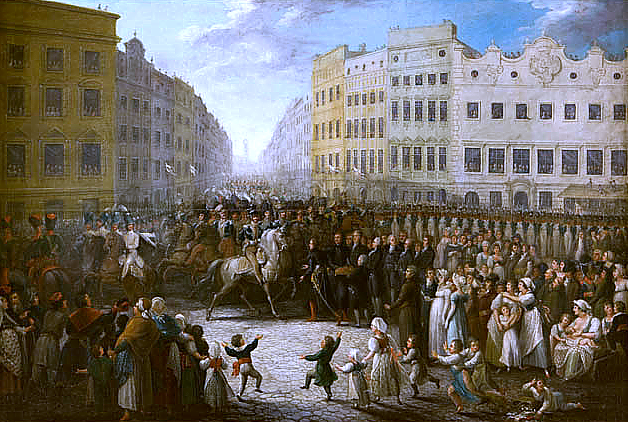
Poniatowski's Entrance into Kraków
