= 6th Rifle Corps =

6th Rifle Corps 6-й стрелковый корпус
- Active: 1st formation: June 1922–July 1941; 2nd formation: c. August 1942–April 1943; 3rd formation: May 1943–1957
- Country: Soviet Union
- Branch: Red Army (Soviet Army from 1946)
- Engagements: Soviet invasion of Poland; Eastern Front of World War II

Commanders
- Notable commanders: Pavel Dybenko; Gaspar Voskanyan; Konstantin Avksentevsky; Ivan Gryaznov; Anton Lopatin; Stepan Povetkin; Semyon Kurkotkin

The 6th Rifle Corps (Russian: 6-й стрелковый корпус) was a rifle corps of the Soviet Union's Red Army and later the Soviet Army, formed three different times.

The corps was first formed in 1922, and spent most of the interwar period headquartered at Odessa. It fought in the Soviet invasion of Poland in September 1939, moving into what became western Ukraine. Stationed on the border when Operation Barbarossa, the German invasion of the Soviet Union, began on 22 June 1941, the corps was destroyed in the first weeks of the war. Reformed in mid-1942, the corps' second formation was converted into the 19th Guards Rifle Corps in April 1943. The corps' third formation was formed in May of that year, and fought in the Continuation War. Postwar it was relocated to the North Caucasus, renamed the 6th Army Corps in 1957 before being disbanded in 1960.

== History ==
=== Interwar period ===
The 6th Rifle Corps was first formed in Kiev in June 1922, in accordance with an order of the Commander of the Armed Forces of Ukraine and Crimea on 23 May 1922, to be formed from units formerly part of the Kiev and Kharkov Military Districts. The corps was not headquartered in Kiev for long, however, and moved to Yelizavetgrad in the month of its formation. It became part of the Ukrainian Military District upon its formation, and relocated south to Odessa in March 1923. In May 1935 the corps joined the Kharkov Military District when the Ukrainian Military District was split, but it transferred back to the Kiev Military District in 1937.

On 26 July 1938, the Kiev Military District was converted to the Kiev Special Military District (KOVO), and army groups were formed. The headquarters of the Odessa Army Group (ODAGA) was formed on the basis of HQ 6th RC in Odessa.

A new headquarters was formed for the corps in Odessa. On 16 September 1939 the corps joined the Ukrainian Front, fighting in the Soviet invasion of Poland. It advanced into what was annexed to the Soviet Union as western Ukraine, and its headquarters was established at Yavorov at the conclusion of the operation.

At that time the corps consisted of 41st, 97th, and 159th Rifle Divisions, and was a part of 6th Army of the Kiev Special Military District on 22 June 1941. The corps was part of the "operational army" from 22 June to 25 September.

=== Operation Barbarossa ===
On 22 June, the German invasion of the Soviet Union, Operation Barbarossa, began. The 41st Rifle Division maintained the defence in the 6th Fortified Region (Rava-Ruska) and kept the defence there, where they managed to halt the German attack until 23 June. Moreover, part of the 41st Rifle Division not only held the area, but also entered the territory occupied by Germany, more than three kilometers away. The 159th Rifle Division had to be moved from the area of Nemirov Mageruv on 22 June. On 23 June the German troops attacked the junction between the 159th and 97th Division, endangering the army. By the evening of 24 June the gap between the corps' divisions reached 40 kilometers, and was exploited by the German troops, who captured Nemirov by the end of the same day.

On 25 June, the 41st Rifle Division and the 159th Rifle Division held defensive positions; the 97th Rifle Division, in conjunction with the 3rd Cavalry Division and parts of the 4th Mechanized Corps, was tasked to restore the position on the flank of the German units, advancing along the highway to reach the Drogomysl–Swidnica–Morantse line. Although the divisions held fortified area, the morale of the troops dwindled. From 22 to 25 June, there were large numbers of deserters, many of whom were shot.

The 97th Division was unsuccessful in securing the corps' flank, and although 41st Rifle Division and the 159th Rifle Division still defended the area, they were forced to leave the position and started a planned withdrawal. The disorganized and battered 97th Rifle Division was meanwhile concentrated in the area of the Stazhiska highway and the forest to the south.

On 8 July the corps, supported by the 186th Anti-Tank Regiment, the 109th and 229th corps artillery regiments, and 30 tanks of the 12th Tank Division, went on the offensive. Providing the right flank of 26th Army's assault group, they advanced a few dozen kilometers. However, the troops were forced to retreat to the north, in the direction of Kiev, on the flank of the enemy troops. After this onset the corps as a combat unit ceased to exist. That is, the corps' individual units were directly subordinated to the army. The corps officially ceased to exist by late July. The corps headquarters was officially disbanded on 25 September 1941, after being destroyed during the initial phase of Operation Barbarossa.

=== Second Formation ===
The corps' second formation was formed in summer 1942.

150th Rifle Division was reformed in July 1942. Within two weeks it was assigned to the 6th "Siberian Volunteer" Rifle Corps and began moving by rail to camps near Moscow where it received the last of its support troops and transport. On September 30, the 150th Rifle Division set out on a 170 km road march to join the 22nd Army near Belyi, part of the Kalinin Front.

During the Second Rzhev-Sychevka Offensive (Operation Mars) the 150th Division and the 6th Rifle Corps were referred to as "Stalin" units and were regarded as an elite force.

The corps became 19th Guards Rifle Corps on 19 April 1943.

=== Third Formation ===
The corps' third formation was established in May 1943, and fought through the rest of the war. On 1 Jan 1944, the corps was in the 59th Army and was under command of Maj. Gen. S.P. Mikil'sky, and consisted of the 65th, 239th and 310th Rifle Divisions.

The corps fought in the Continuation War with Finland. During the Battle of Tali-Ihantala, in addition to the losses of the Soviet 21st Army, the 6th Rifle Corps of the 23rd Army that attacked east of the 21st Army closer to the Vuoksi waterway suffered 7905 casualties, of which 1458 were killed in action (KIA) and 288 missing in action (MIA), without taking the losses of its supporting formations into account.

==== Postwar ====
The corps headquarters was moved from Latvia to the North Caucasus, and was established at Stalingrad in August 1945. In October 1945 the corps comprised the 10th, 109th, and 327th Rifle Divisions, the first two in the vicinity of what was then still Stalingrad and the third possibly at Kamyshin. On 4 February 1946 it came under the control of the North Caucasus Military District and at the same time all three divisions became independent rifle brigades: the 15th, 18th, and 46th. However, the 15th Ind. Rifle Brigade disbanded in 1947. On 22 August 1949 the corps came again under the command of the reformed Don Military District with its two brigades located at Stalingrad (18th) and Uryupinsk (46th). In October 1953 the brigades were expanded into divisions and became the 68th Mechanised Division at Stalingrad and the 372nd Rifle Division at Uryupinsk. The 372nd Rifle Division was redesignated as the 68th Rifle Division in June 1955.

On 10 June 1957 both the divisions and the corps headquarters was redesignated, the corps becoming the 6th Army Corps which consisted of the 68th Motor Rifle Division (Uryupinsk) and 117th Motor Rifle Division (Stalingrad). The corps was disbanded in 1960.
