= 239th Division =

239th Division may refer to:

- 239th Infantry Division (Wehrmacht), Germany
- 239th Fighter Aviation Division, Russia/Soviet Union
- 239th Rifle Division, Soviet Union

== See also ==
- List of military divisions by number
