= Zadroże =

- Village
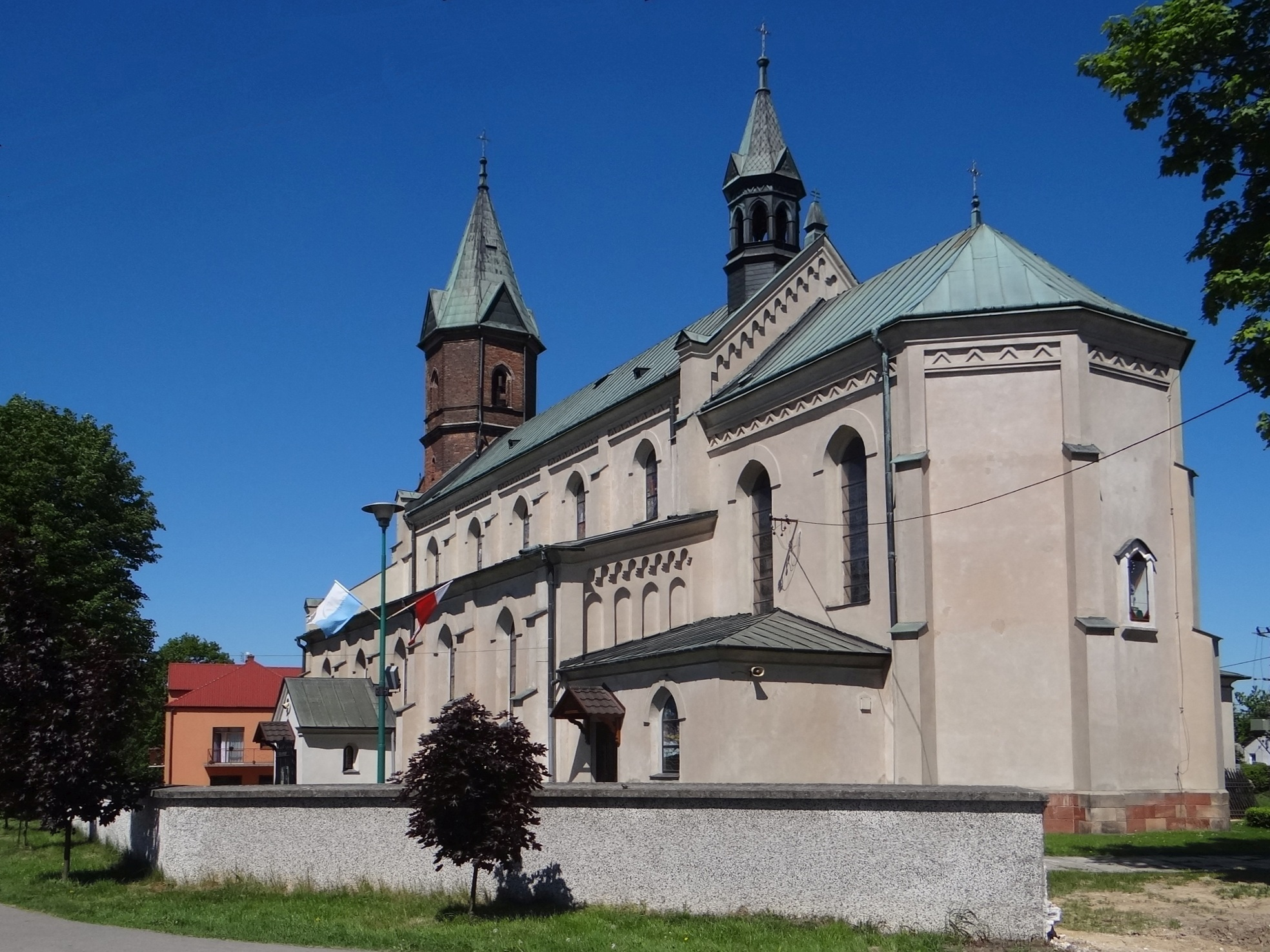
- Catholic church

- Location within Poland
- Coordinates: 50°18′N 19°48′E
- Country: Poland
- Voivodeship: Lesser Poland
- County: Olkusz
- Gmina: Trzyciąż

Zadroże [zaˈdrɔʐɛ] is a village in the administrative district of Gmina Trzyciąż, within Olkusz County, Lesser Poland Voivodeship, in southern Poland. In local baptism records from 1792, the town is called Zadroz.
