= Michałówka, Lesser Poland Voivodeship =

Michałówka
- Location within Poland
- Coordinates: 50°18′34″N 19°41′04″E
- Country: Poland
- Voivodeship: Lesser Poland
- County: Olkusz
- Gmina: Trzyciąż
- Time zone: UTC+1 (CET)
  - Summer (DST): UTC+2 (CEST)
- Area code: +48 12
- Car plates: KOL

Michałówka [mixaˈwufka] is a village in Poland located in Lesser Poland Voivodeship, in Olkusz County, in Gmina Trzyciąż. It had a population of 500 in 2005.
