= Dłubnia Landscape Park =

Protected area in Poland

Coordinates: 50.2842°N 19.8897°E

- Dłubniański Park Krajobrazowy
- IUCN category V (protected landscape/seascape)
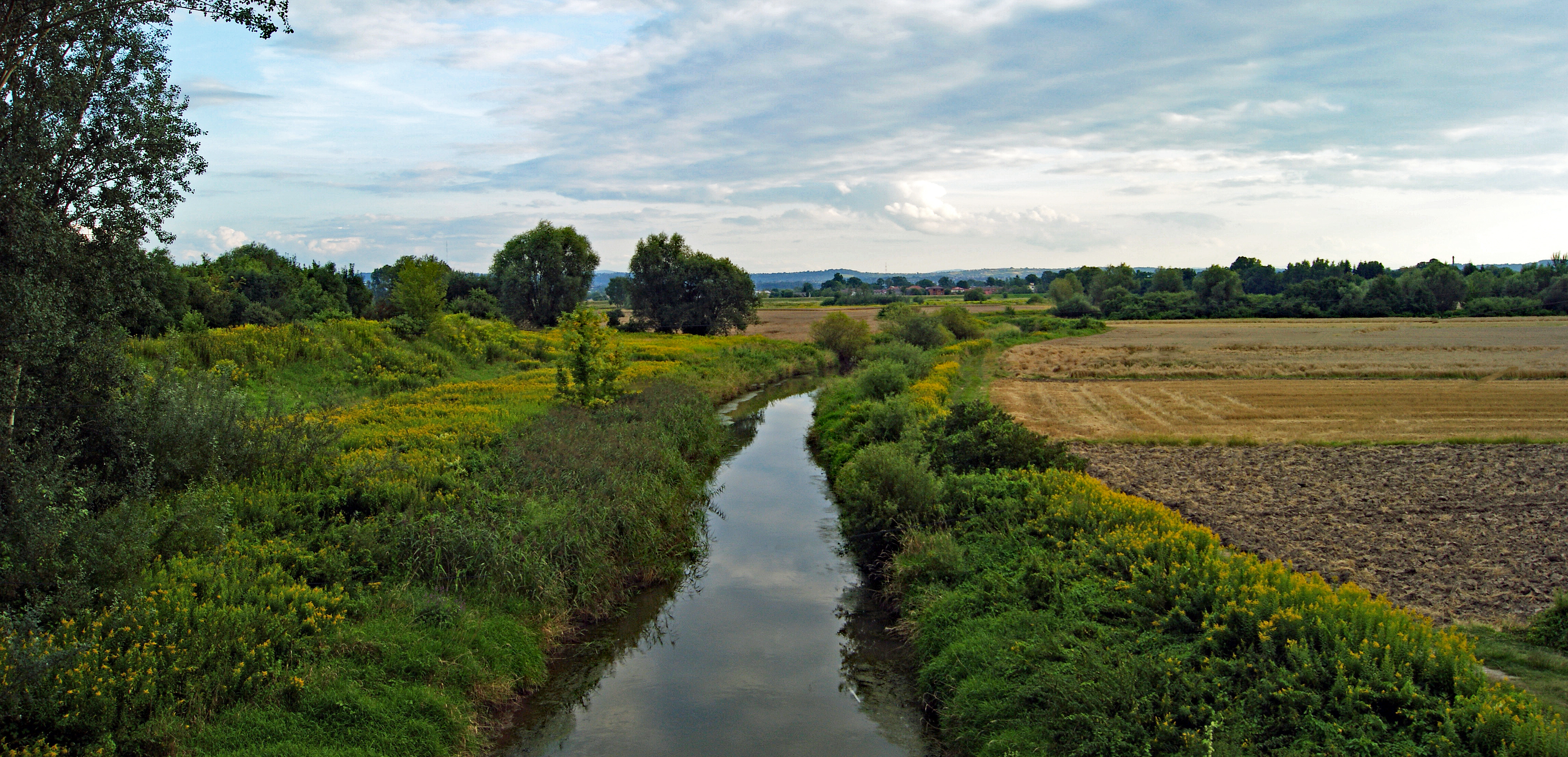
- Dłubnia river valley near Nowa Huta
- Interactive map of Dłubnia Landscape Park
- Location: Lesser Poland Voivodeship
- Area: 109.37 km^{2} (42.23 sq mi)
- Established: 1981

Dłubnia Landscape Park (Dłubniański Park Krajobrazowy) is a protected area (Landscape Park) in southern Poland. Established in 1981, the park covers an area of 109.37 square kilometres (42.23 sq mi). Within the Landscape Park are two nature reserves.

== Location ==
The park lies within the Lesser Poland Voivodeship: in Kraków County (Gmina Iwanowice, Gmina Michałowice, Gmina Skała, Gmina Zielonki), Miechów County (Gmina Gołcza) and in Olkusz County (Gmina Trzyciąż).

The park takes its name from the river Dłubnia, which eventually flows into the Vistula in the Mogiła neighbourhood of Nowa Huta, within the city of Kraków. There is also a neighbourhood – formerly a village – called Dłubnia, within the Wzgórza Krzesławickie district of the city.

== Notes and references ==
- Małopolskie (Lesser Poland) Voivodeship Official Website
- Agency for Regional Development of Lesser Poland - MARR
- General statistics
