= Imbramowice, Lesser Poland Voivodeship =

Imbramowice
- Village
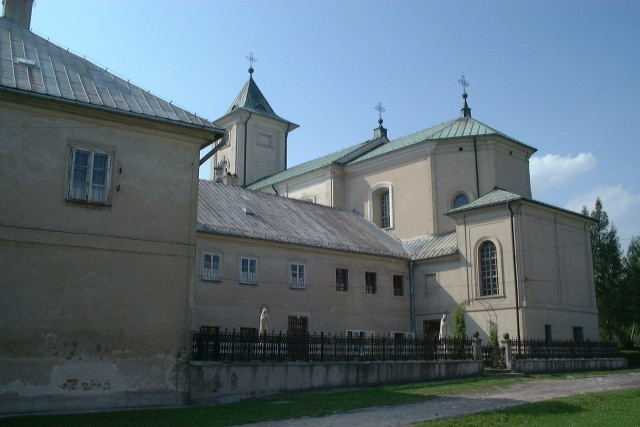
- Norbertine monastery

- Location within Poland
- Coordinates: 50°18′5″N 19°51′41″E
- Country: Poland
- Voivodeship: Lesser Poland
- County: Olkusz
- Gmina: Trzyciąż
- Population: 490
- Website: http://www.imbramowice.pl

Imbramowice [imbramɔˈvit͡sɛ] is a village in the administrative district of Gmina Trzyciąż, within Olkusz County, Lesser Poland Voivodeship, in southern Poland. Imbramowice is the site of a Premonstratensian (Norbertine) monastery.
