= Zagórowa =

- Village
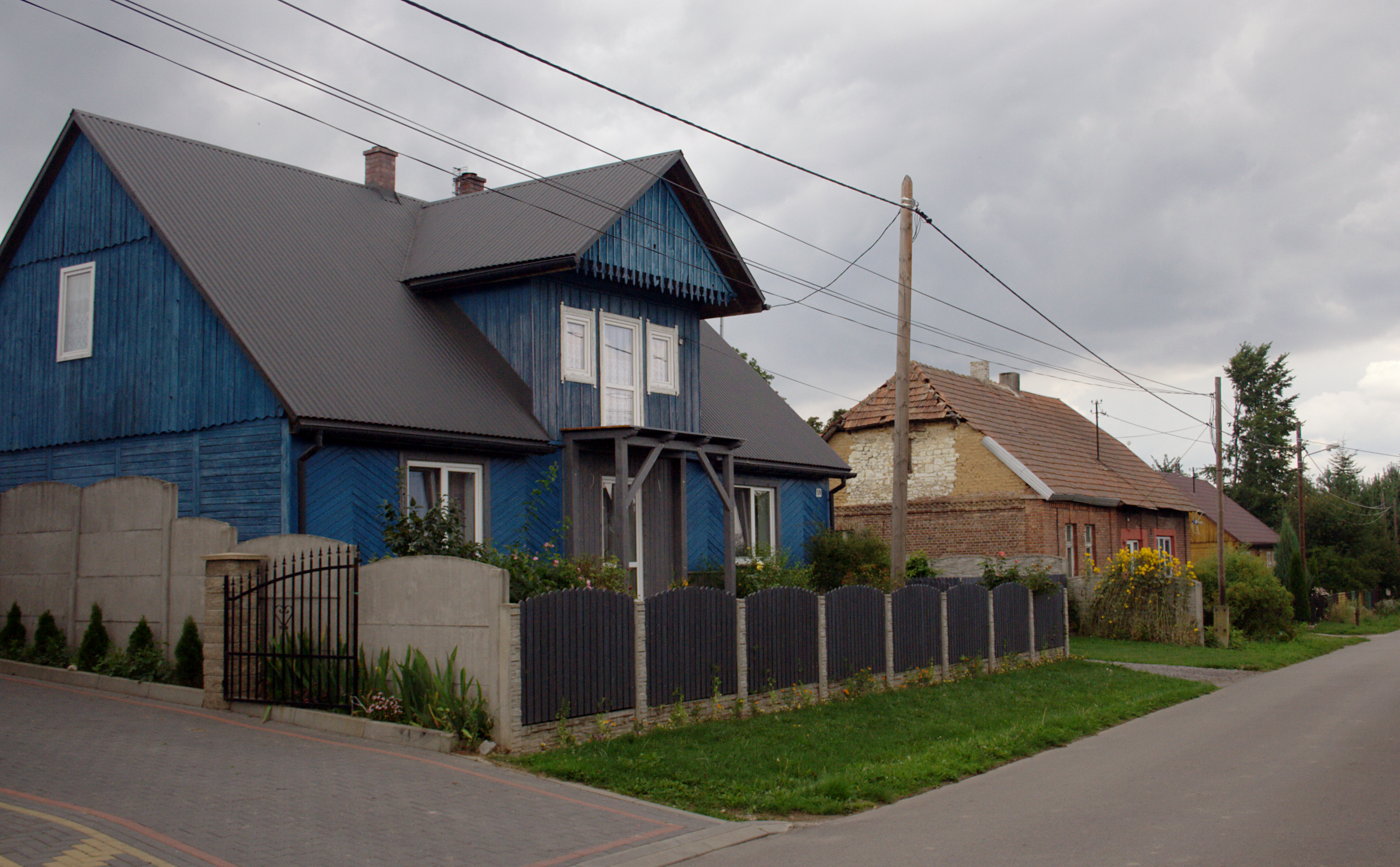

- Location within Poland
- Coordinates: 50°18′N 19°49′E
- Country: Poland
- Voivodeship: Lesser Poland
- County: Olkusz
- Gmina: Trzyciąż

Zagórowa [zaɡuˈrɔva] is a village in the administrative district of Gmina Trzyciąż, within Olkusz County, Lesser Poland Voivodeship, in southern Poland.
