= Milonki =

- Village
- Location within Poland
- Coordinates: 50°17′N 19°48′E
- Country: Poland
- Voivodeship: Lesser Poland
- County: Olkusz
- Gmina: Trzyciąż

Milonki [miˈlɔŋki] is a village in the administrative district of Gmina Trzyciąż, within Olkusz County, Lesser Poland Voivodeship, in southern Poland.
