= 112th Infantry Division (Wehrmacht) =

- 112. Infanterie-Division
- Divisional insignia of the 112th Infantry Division
- Active: 1940–43
- Country: Nazi Germany
- Branch: Army
- Type: Infantry
- Size: Division
- Engagements: World War II: Operation Barbarossa; Smolensk; Kiev; Moscow

The 112th Infantry Division (German: 112. Infanteriedivision) was a German Army infantry division active in World War II.

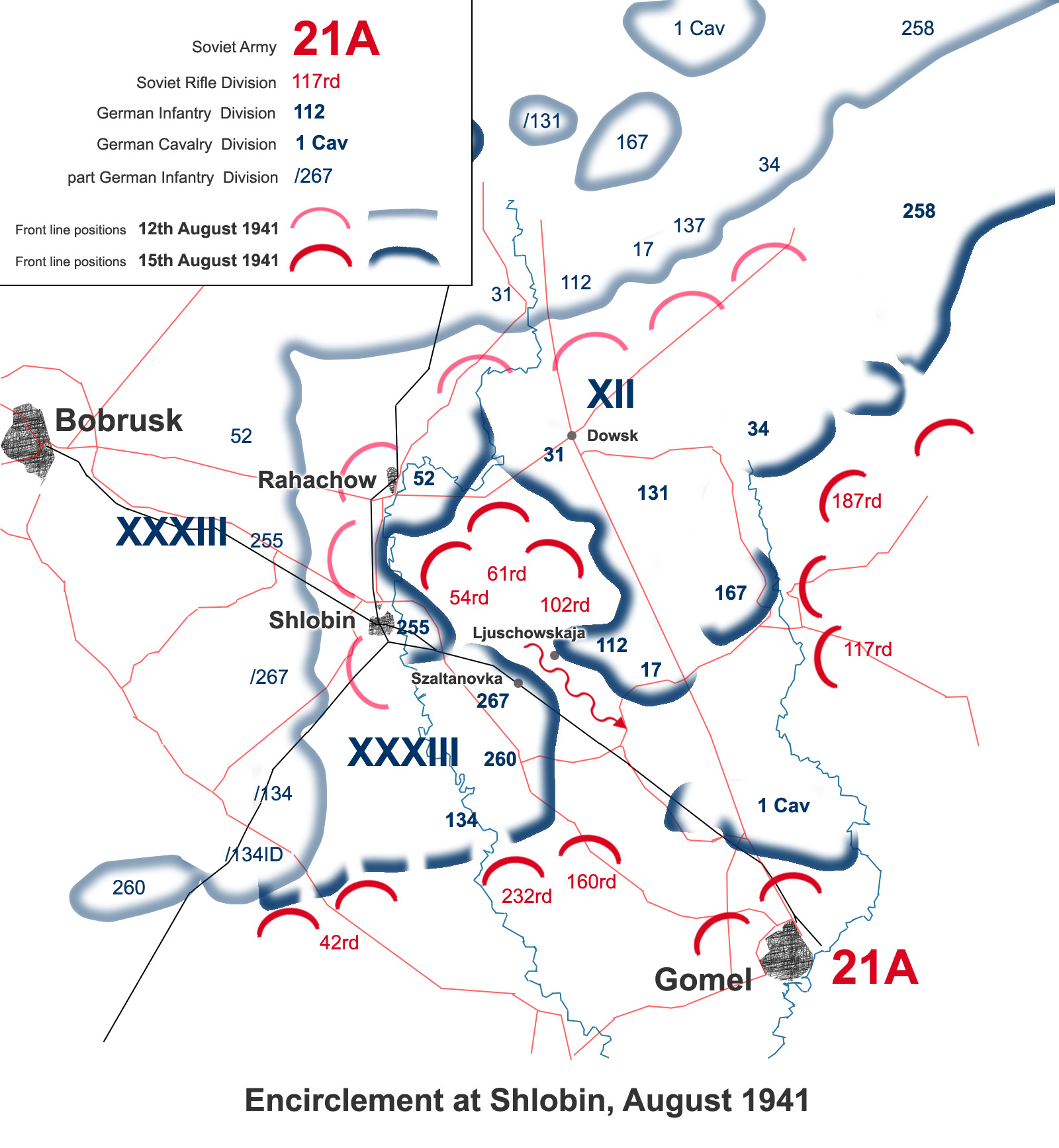
Encirclement battle at Zhlobin area, August 1941

== History ==
The division was formed in December 1940 from elements of 34th Infantry division and 33rd infantry division, as part of the 12th wave of German mobilization.

The 112th Infantry Division remained in OKH reserve during the opening phase of operation Barbarossa, and was committed to the southern wing in the second half of July during the battle of Smolensk. Here elements of the Soviet 21st Army had pushed back forward German elements and advanced up to 80 kilometers in to the German rear.

At the beginning of August, the 112th division was manning defensive positions on the Army group's southern flank, as part of 2nd Armies XII Corps. As Guderian's 2nd Panzer group started its wheel from Smolensk to the south on 8 August, 2nd Army, on its right flank, was slow to join in because of poor weather, ammunition shortages, and the hesitancy of General Weichs, its Army commander.

On 12 August the 2nd Army finally launched its attack south-east of Bobrusk. It broke through the defenses of the Soviet 21st Army, and in three days fighting, encircled the bulk of the soviet 63rd Rifle corps, in a pocket at Zhlobin.

Lacking in mobile units, the 112th division, still part of XII Army Corps, formed the eastern pincer of the attack; breaking through successive defensive lines and eventually linking up with 267th Infantry division coming from the other way, near the village of Ljuschowskaja and the Saltanovka railway station, on the Zhlobin - Gomel rail line. Stretching a thin barrier across the Soviet Corps escape route, the 112th Division spent the next 3 days fending off repeated, and increasingly desperate escape attempts. By 20 August General Feldt’s 1st Cavalry Division had captured Gormel, and 2nd army tallied its accomplishments, totalling 78,000 prisoners, 700 guns, and 144 tanks; many of these from the Shobin pocket.

By the tail end of October the encirclement battles around Briansk were over, the 112th crossed the Oka river south of Belev, inching its way forward slowly through the mud. However the advance was breaking down due to deteriorating road conditions and supply difficulties. The long eastern flank of 2 panzer group was a problem, and Generaloberst Guderian shifted the 112th division as part of the LIII corps to his right to shore up the protection there

The division, redeploying to the region south of Tula, met forces from the Soviet 13th Army near Teploye, who were attempting to drive on Tula from the east and disrupt the German armoured thrust towards Moscow. The Soviets using the superior mobility of their cavalry units, delayed the LIII corps mission so much that Guderian had to reinforce it with tanks, artillery and flak, a move which slowed the whole advance of the Panzer Grupe.

With the aid of the reinforcements, the 112th infantry division drove the 13th Army forces off to the east and advanced towards Stalinogorsk. Here it was attacked by newly arrived Siberian 239th Rifle Division, supported by tanks, suffered a severe reverse, and showed 'signs of panic'. Unprepared for the winter conditions, each infantry regiment had already lost 500 men to frostbite, and in the severe cold, machine guns often failed to fire. The division was now very weak and unable to advance further. On 2 November 1942 the division was disbanded. The remaining infantry were amalgamated and formed into the 112 divisional group (a regimental equivalent) and along with support elements from the division were used to build Corps Detachment B.

== Organization ==
1941

- 110 Infantry Regiment
- 256 Infantry Regiment
- 258 Infantry Regiment
- 86 Artillery Regiment
- 112 Anti-tank battalion
- 120 Reconnaissance battalion
- 112 Engineer battalion
- 112 Signals battalion
- 112 Division services

== Commanders ==
- General der Infanterie Friedrich Mieth (10 December 1940 – 10 November 1942)
- Generalmajor Albert Newiger (10 November 1942 – 20 Juni 1943)
- General der Artillerie Rolf Wuthmann (20 Juni – 3 September 1943)
- Generalleutnant Theobald Lieb (3 September 1943 – unknown)
