= 310th Rifle Division =

310th Rifle Division (July 15, 1941 – 1945)
- Maj. Gen. N. F. Zamirovski, first commander of the 310th
- Active: 1941–1945
- Country: Soviet Union
- Branch: Red Army
- Type: Infantry
- Size: Division
- Engagements: Siege of Leningrad; Lyuban Offensive Operation; Novgorod–Luga Offensive; Svir–Petrozavodsk Offensive; Vistula-Oder Offensive; East Pomeranian Offensive; Berlin Strategic Offensive
- Decorations: Order of Lenin; Order of the Red Banner
- Battle honours: Novgorod

Commanders
- Notable commanders: Maj. Gen. Nikifor Matveevich Zamirovski; Col. Mikhail Andreevich Orlov; Col. Nikolai Vasilevich Rogov

The 310th Rifle Division was a standard Red Army rifle division formed on July 15, 1941 in Kazakhstan before being sent to the vicinity of Leningrad, where it spent most of the war, sharing a similar combat path with its "sister", the 311th Rifle Division. The soldiers of the division fought until early 1944 to, first, hold open some sort of lifeline to the besieged city, then to break the siege and drive off the besieging German forces. They then participated in the offensive that drove Germany's Finnish allies out of the war. Finally, the division was redeployed to take the fight to the German heartland in the winter and spring of 1945. It ended the war north of Berlin with a very creditable combat record for any rifle division.

== Formation ==
The 310th began forming in mid July 1941 in Kazakhstan in the Akmolinsk region of the Central Asia Military District. The personnel of the division were mostly Kazakhs at this time. Its order of battle was as follows:

- 1080th Rifle Regiment
- 1082nd Rifle Regiment
- 1084th Rifle Regiment
- 860th Artillery Regiment

Col. Nikifor Matveevich Zamirovski was assigned to command on July 15, and he would hold this assignment until May 30, 1942, being promoted to Major General on January 22. The division was given about six weeks to form up before it was sent by rail all the way to the Northwestern Front, ending its journey in the Tikhvin area east of Leningrad. It was first assigned to the 52nd Army, but was reassigned to the 54th Army when that army was first formed on September 2.

== Battle of Leningrad ==
German forces cut off and isolated the city on September 8. The 310th took part in the First Sinyavino Offensive beginning on September 10; during the following 16 days of off-and-on heavy fighting the 54th Army advanced only 6 – 10 km, and even some of these gains were later retaken by the German XXXIX Motorized Corps. The offensive was judged a failure and led to the cashiering and court-martial of Marshal G.I. Kulik, but it benefited the Soviets overall by pulling German reserves away from the Moscow axis and also delaying the transfer of the XXXXI Motorized Corps to Army Group Center.

The 310th was earmarked for another offensive on Sinyavino in mid-October but this was preempted by the German offensive on Tikhvin. On October 23 the division was shifted to the 4th Army along with the 4th Guards Rifle Division. On November 8 Tikhvin fell, while another German thrust towards Volkhov was slowly forcing four rifle divisions back towards that city, driving a wedge between the 4th and 54th Armies. It was at this time that the 310th began operating alongside its "sister" 311th Rifle Division. A provisional battle group of the 8th Panzer Division tried to outflank the Soviet defenses east of Volkhov on the 8th, but a desperate counterattack by the 310th at Zelenets Station thwarted this. On the following day, the 54th Army commander, Maj. Gen. Ivan Ivanovich Fedyuninski, requested that STAVKA assign the 4th Army's Volkhov Operational Group, including both the 310th and 311th, to him, which was approved. By November 25 the main shock group of the 54th Army, the 3rd Guards, 310th and 311th Rifle Divisions, began their part of the Tikhvin counteroffensive with an attack on the 21st Infantry Division, driving it back several kilometres over the following days. The German 18th Army, vastly overextended, continued to fall back under pressure during December. On December 17 the division was transferred once again to the 4th Army, which was shortly afterwards assigned to the Volkhov Front; it would remain in that army until February 1943.

During the Lyuban Offensive Operation, the 310th played relatively minor roles. In January it was in the Kirishi area, tying down German forces in that salient. By May 1942, 4th Army was temporarily back under the Leningrad Front, and the division was earmarked for an offensive towards Chudovo in another attempt to reestablish firm communications with the 2nd Shock Army, but this was unsuccessful.

== Novgorod Offensive ==
General Zamirovski handed command of the division to Col. Mikhail Andreevich Orlov at the end of May 1942. In June, the 4th Army returned to the Volkhov Front, where the 310th would remain until February 1944, in the 52nd Army in the spring of 1943, then in the 59th Army for the duration of this period. In late December 1942, Colonel Orlov was replaced by Col. Nikolai Vasilevich Rogov, who would remain in command, with two brief interruptions, until the end of the war. In September 1943, the division spent a few weeks rebuilding in front reserves for the coming offensives, and was assigned to the 6th Rifle Corps on its return to the lines.

In late 1943, the Leningrad, Volkhov and 2nd Baltic Fronts began planning the operations that would finally drive the besiegers away from Leningrad and, if all went well, destroy one or both of the armies of German Army Group North. The assault began on January 14, 1944. The 6th Rifle Corps was in a bridgehead west of the Volkhov river on the front's right flank. The 310th was in the Corps' first echelon along with the 239th Rifle Division, with the 65th Rifle Division in reserve, the 2nd Rifle Division of the 112th Rifle Corps in flank support, and the 16th Tank Brigade awaiting orders. In total the army fired 133,000 artillery rounds in preparation, and the ground assault went in at 1050 hours. However, 6th Corps stalled after just 1km, in large part due to poor use of the infantry support tanks. Just to the south, however, two regiments of the 378th Rifle Division of the 14th Rifle Corps staged a premature and unauthorized attack which tore through the first two German trench lines, easing the way for 6th Corps. The following day, the corps attack was reinforced with the 16th and 29th Tank Brigades, 65th Rifle Division, and a self-propelled artillery regiment. This was sufficient to secure an advance of 7km against heavy resistance, encircling and defeating elements of the German 28th Light Infantry Division. By late on January 16, the division had helped to tear a 20km wide hole in main German defense belt.

The following day, despite bad weather, difficult terrain and lack of transport, the 59th Army was clearly threatening to encircle the German XXXVIII Army Corps at Novgorod. On the night of January 19 these forces got the order to break out along the last remaining route. The city was liberated on the morning of the 20th, and on the next day most of the survivors of the German corps were surrounded and soon destroyed by the 6th Rifle Corps and the 372nd Rifle Division. In recognition of this feat, the 310th Rifle Division was awarded the honorific title "Novgorod":

"NOVGOROD" - 310 Rifle Division (Colonel Rogov, Nikolai Vasilevich)... the troops who participated in the battles with the enemy, and the breakthrough and liberation of Novgorod, by the order of the Supreme High Command of 20 January 1944, and a commendation in Moscow, are given a salute of 20 artillery salvos from 224 guns.

As the offensive continued, the Volkhov Front was dissolved on February 13, and the division was reassigned to the Leningrad Front, first in the 67th Army and then in the 54th Army once again. In April it joined the 99th Rifle Corps in the 3rd Baltic Front until June.

== Svir–Petrozavodsk Offensive ==
Along with the 99th Rifle Corps, the 310th was transferred in June to the 7th Army of the Karelian Front for the final offensive against Finland, which began on this sector on June 20. The division played an undistinguished role in this secondary operation, and after the Finnish surrender was reassigned to the 4th Rifle Corps, which in November went into the 32nd Army in the Reserve of the Supreme High Command. In December the division was reassigned to the 134th Rifle Corps while still in reserve, while it was moved to Poland to become part of the 19th Army in the 2nd Belorussian Front in January 1945, ready for the assault on Germany. It remained in that corps, army and front for the duration of the war.

== Advance ==
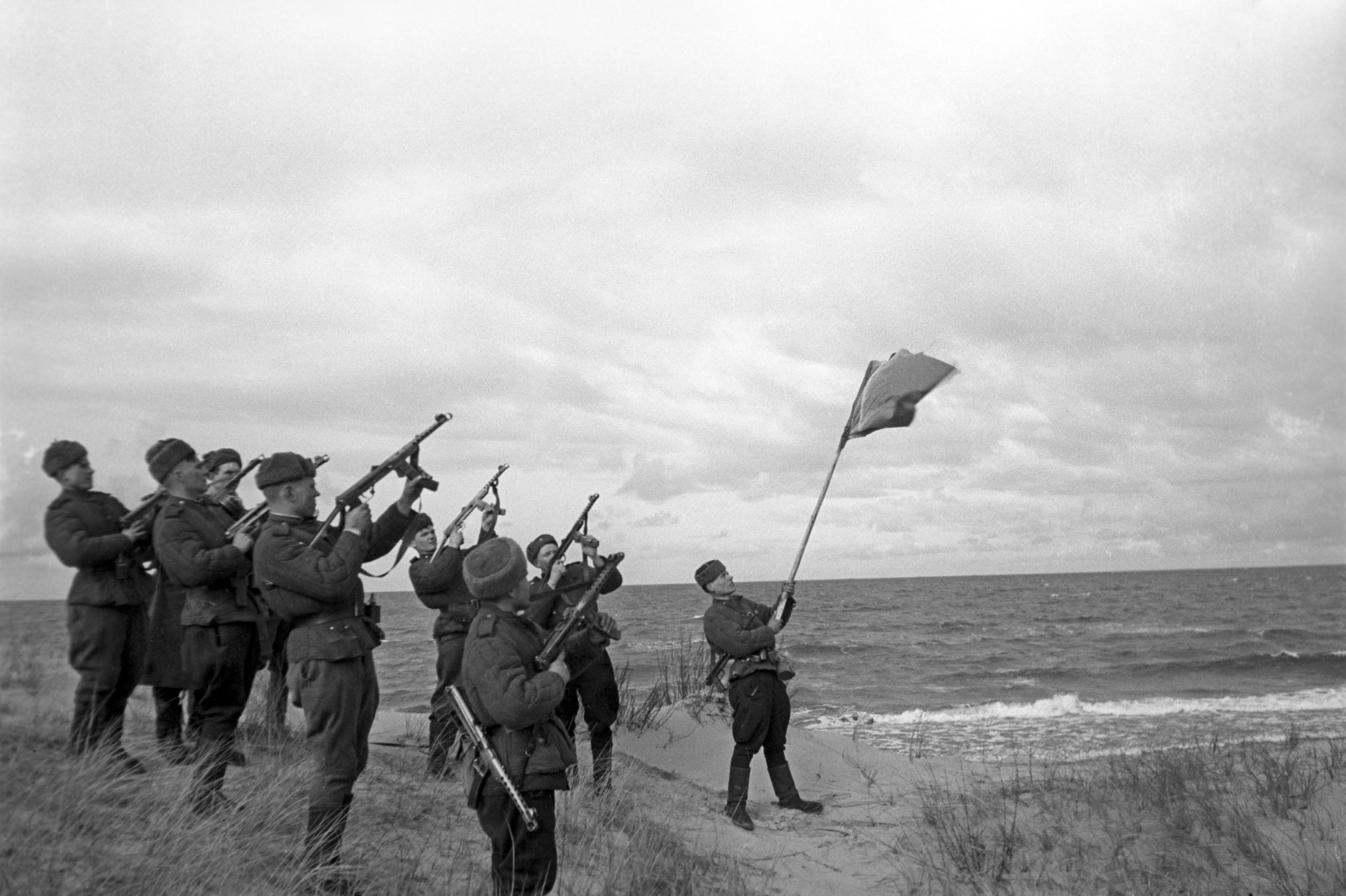
Scouts of the 310th saluting the raising of the Soviet flag at Koszalin on the Baltic Sea, 15 March 1945

During the advance into Germany, the 19th Army mostly played a secondary role in the fighting through East Prussia and Pomerania, and by Victory Day was in the vicinity of Swinemunde. At the end of the war, the official title of the division was 310th Rifle, Novgorod, Order of Lenin, Order of the Red Banner Division. (Russian: 310-я стрелковая Новгородская ордена Ленина Краснознамённая дивизия.)

== Postwar ==
The division was disbanded "in place" during the summer of 1945 with the Northern Group of Forces.
