= Sucha, Lesser Poland Voivodeship =

Sucha
- Village
- Location within Poland
- Coordinates: 50°19′N 19°46′E
- Country: Poland
- Voivodeship: Lesser Poland
- County: Olkusz
- Gmina: Trzyciąż

Sucha [ˈsuxa] is a village in the administrative district of Gmina Trzyciąż, within Olkusz County, Lesser Poland Voivodeship, in southern Poland.
