= Trzyciąż =

- Village
- Location within Poland
- Coordinates: 50°19′N 19°46′E
- Country: Poland
- Voivodeship: Lesser Poland
- County: Olkusz
- Gmina: Trzyciąż

Trzyciąż [ˈtʂɨt͡ɕɔ̃ʂ] is a village in Olkusz County, Lesser Poland Voivodeship, in southern Poland. It is the seat of the gmina (administrative district) called Gmina Trzyciąż.
