= Gmina Trzyciąż =

Gmina Trzyciąż Trzyciąż Commune
- Gmina
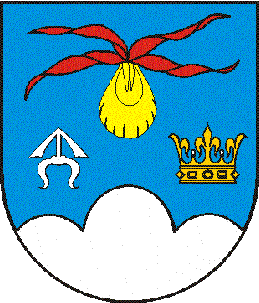
- Coat of arms

- Location within Lesser Poland Voivodeship Location within Poland
- Coordinates (Trzyciąż): 50°19′N 19°46′E
- Country: Poland
- Voivodeship: Lesser Poland
- County: Olkusz
- Seat: Trzyciąż

Area
  - Total: 96.56 km^{2} (37.28 sq mi)

Population (2006)
  - Total: 7,131
  - Density: 73.85/km^{2} (191.3/sq mi)
- Website: http://www.trzyciaz.ug.pl

Gmina Trzyciąż is a rural gmina (administrative district) in Olkusz County, Lesser Poland Voivodeship, in southern Poland. Its seat is the village of Trzyciąż, which lies approximately 15 kilometres (9 mi) east of Olkusz and 31 km (19 mi) north-west of the regional capital Kraków.

The gmina covers an area of 96.56 square kilometres (37.3 sq mi), and as of 2006 its total population is 7,131.

The gmina contains part of the protected area called Dłubnia Landscape Park.

== Villages ==
Gmina Trzyciąż contains the villages and settlements of Glanów, Imbramowice, Jangrot, Małyszyce, Michałówka, Milonki, Podchybie, Porąbka, Ściborzyce, Sucha, Trzyciąż, Zadroże and Zagórowa.

== Neighbouring gminas ==
Gmina Trzyciąż is bordered by the gminas of Gołcza, Olkusz, Skała, Sułoszowa and Wolbrom.
