= Glanów =

- Village
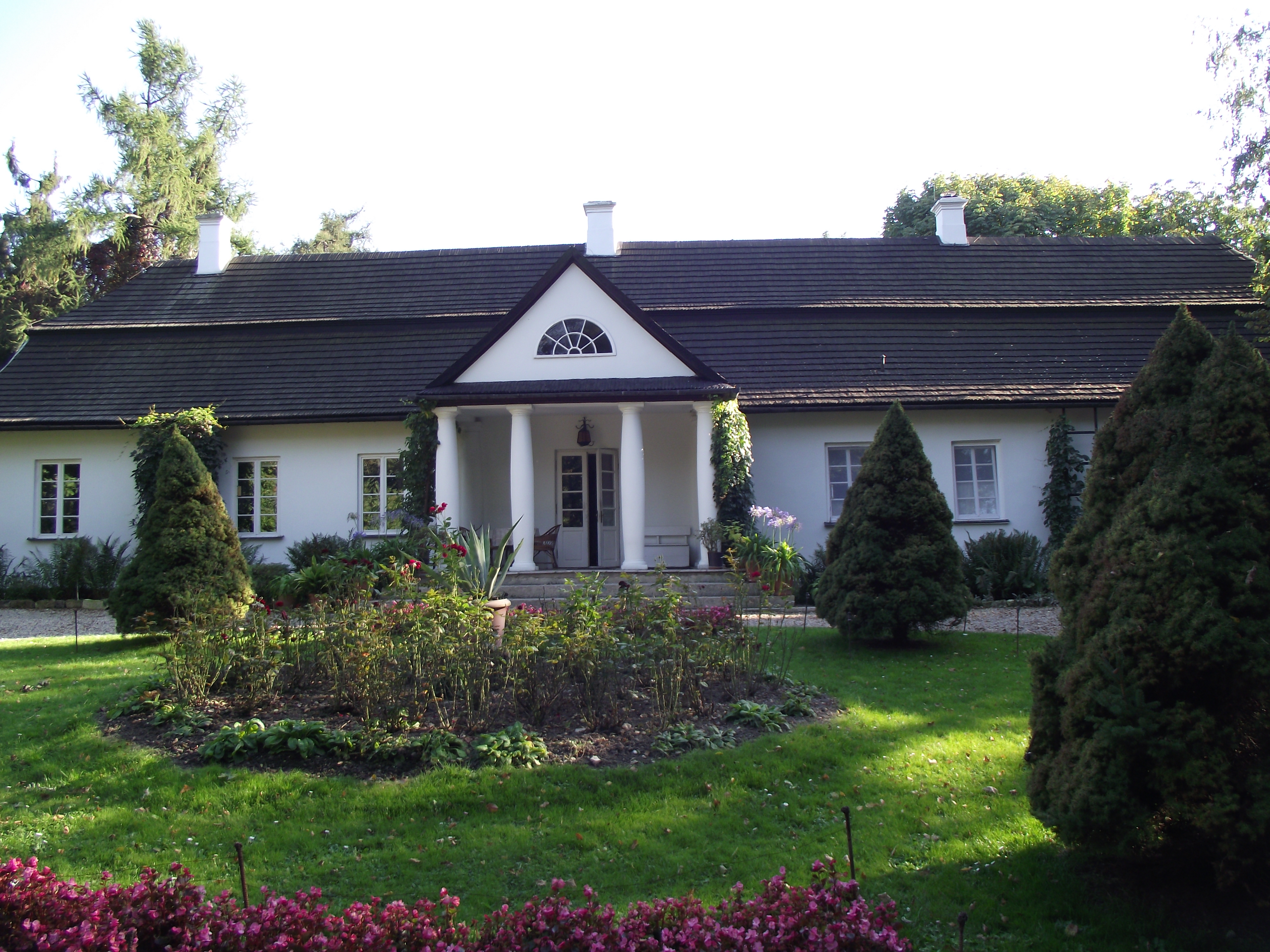
- Manor house

- Location within Poland
- Coordinates: 50°18′58″N 19°48′57″E
- Country: Poland
- Voivodeship: Lesser Poland
- County: Olkusz
- Gmina: Trzyciąż
- Population: 440

Glanów [ˈɡlanuf] is a village in the administrative district of Gmina Trzyciąż, within Olkusz County, Lesser Poland Voivodeship, in southern Poland.
