= Podchybie, Olkusz County =

Podchybie
- Village
- Location within Poland
- Coordinates: 50°20′N 19°46′E
- Country: Poland
- Voivodeship: Lesser Poland
- County: Olkusz
- Gmina: Trzyciąż
- Population (approx.): 160

Podchybie [pɔtˈxɨbjɛ] is a village in the administrative district of Gmina Trzyciąż, within Olkusz County, Lesser Poland Voivodeship, in southern Poland.

The village has an approximate population of 160.
