= Sudice (Blansko District) =

- Municipality
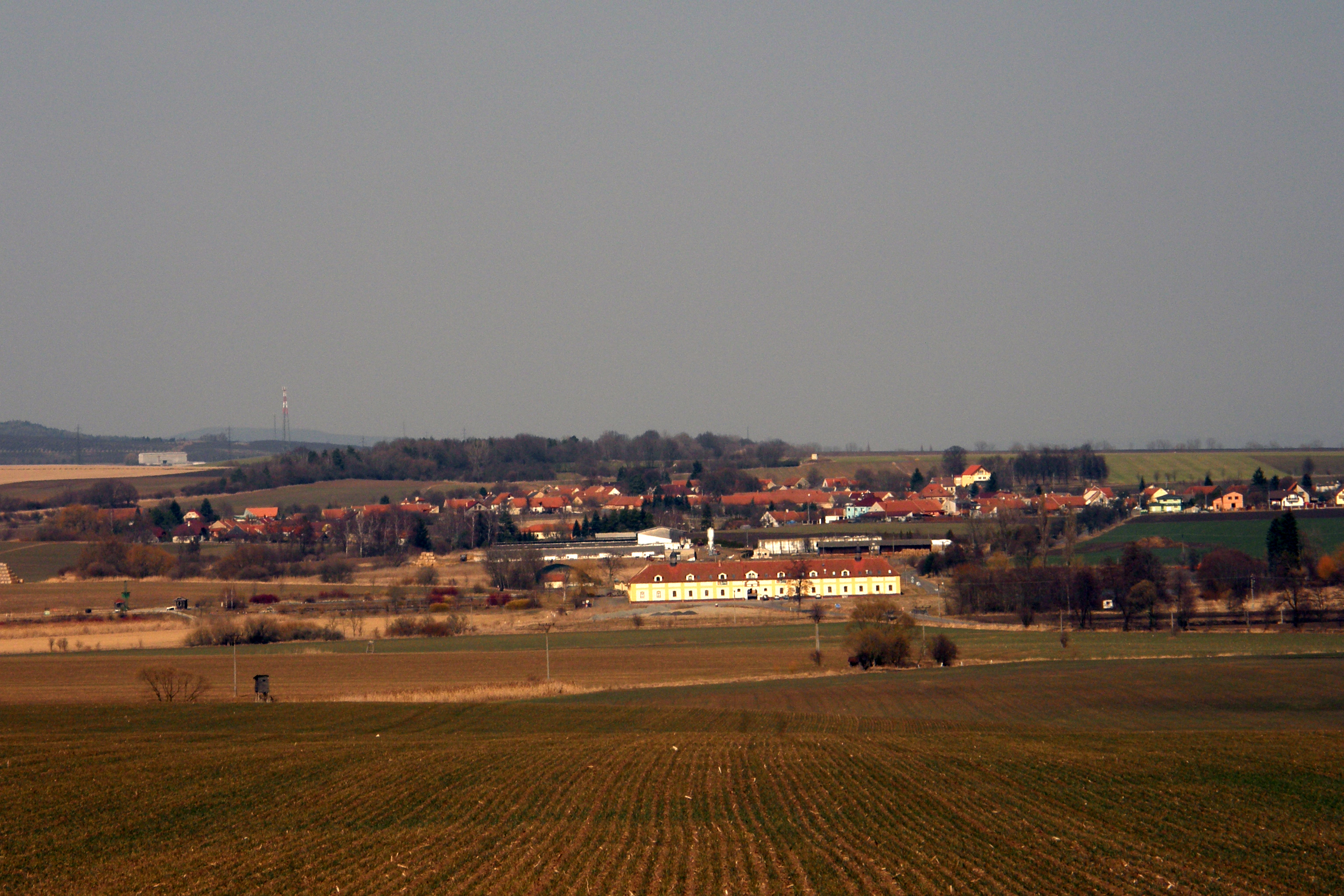
- View from the south

- Flag Coat of arms

- Location in the Czech Republic
- Coordinates: 49°31′48″N 16°40′7″E
- Country: Czech Republic
- Region: South Moravian
- District: Blansko
- First mentioned: 1238

Area
  - Total: 5.39 km^{2} (2.08 sq mi)
- Elevation: 363 m (1,191 ft)

Population (2026-01-01)
  - Total: 461
  - Density: 85.5/km^{2} (222/sq mi)
- Time zone: UTC+1 (CET)
  - Summer (DST): UTC+2 (CEST)
- Postal code: 680 01
- Website: sudice-bk.cz

Sudice is a municipality and village in Blansko District in the South Moravian Region of the Czech Republic. It has about 500 inhabitants.

Sudice lies approximately 18 kilometres (11 mi) north of Blansko, 37 km (23 mi) north of Brno, and 173 km (107 mi) east of Prague.

== Demographics ==
Historical population
Year	Pop.	±%
1869	436	—
1880	573	+31.4%
1890	575	+0.3%
1900	597	+3.8%
1910	667	+11.7%
1921	706	+5.8%
1930	599	−15.2%
1950	580	−3.2%
1961	574	−1.0%
1970	477	−16.9%
1980	442	−7.3%
1991	382	−13.6%
2001	397	+3.9%
2011	438	+10.3%
2021	472	+7.8%
Source: Censuses
