= Sudice (Třebíč District) =

- Municipality
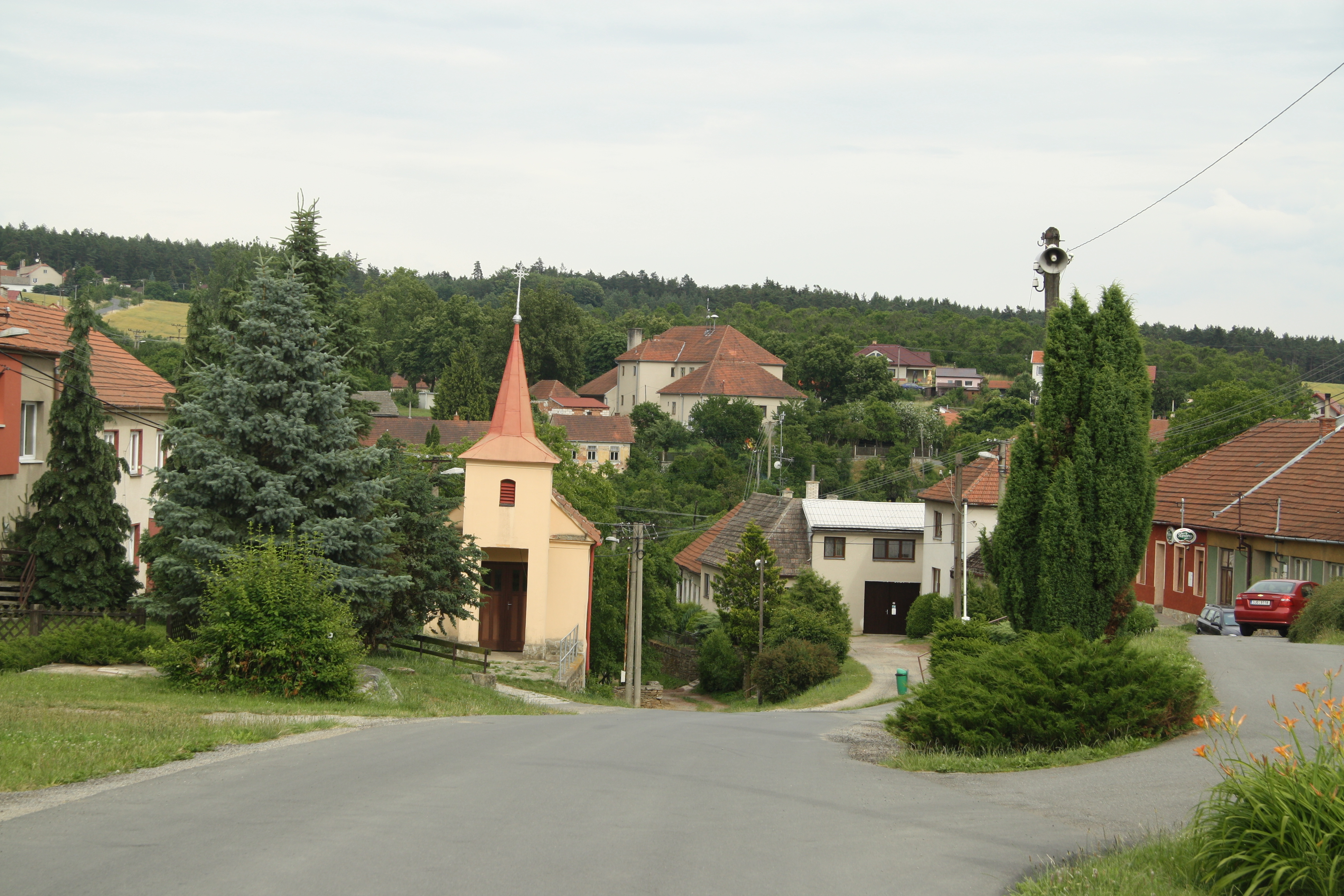
- Centre of Sudice with the Chapel of Saint Medardus

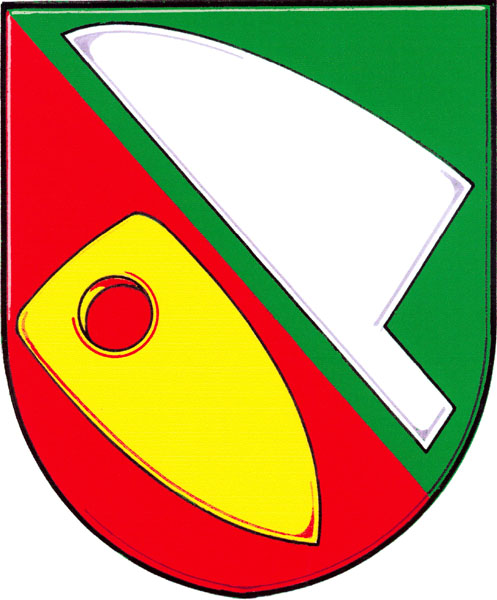
- Flag Coat of arms

- Location in the Czech Republic
- Coordinates: 49°10′55″N 16°14′18″E
- Country: Czech Republic
- Region: Vysočina
- District: Třebíč
- First mentioned: 1101

Area
  - Total: 6.12 km^{2} (2.36 sq mi)
- Elevation: 435 m (1,427 ft)

Population (2026-01-01)
  - Total: 352
  - Density: 57.5/km^{2} (149/sq mi)
- Time zone: UTC+1 (CET)
  - Summer (DST): UTC+2 (CEST)
- Postal code: 675 73
- Website: www.sudice.eu

Sudice (German: Suditz) is a municipality and village in Třebíč District in the Vysočina Region of the Czech Republic. It has about 400 inhabitants.

Sudice lies approximately 27 kilometres (17 mi) east of Třebíč, 53 km (33 mi) south-east of Jihlava, and 165 km (103 mi) south-east of Prague.

== Demographics ==
Historical population
Year	Pop.	±%
1869	359	—
1880	381	+6.1%
1890	388	+1.8%
1900	412	+6.2%
1910	462	+12.1%
1921	565	+22.3%
1930	541	−4.2%
1950	543	+0.4%
1961	568	+4.6%
1970	510	−10.2%
1980	425	−16.7%
1991	354	−16.7%
2001	327	−7.6%
2011	333	+1.8%
2021	343	+3.0%
Source: Censuses
