= Velmino =

Rural locality in Uzlovsky District, Tula Oblast, Russia

Coordinates: 53°55′N 38°13′E

Velmino (Russian: Ве́льмино) is a rural locality (a village) in Uzlovsky District of Tula Oblast, Russia.
