= Pomorzowice =

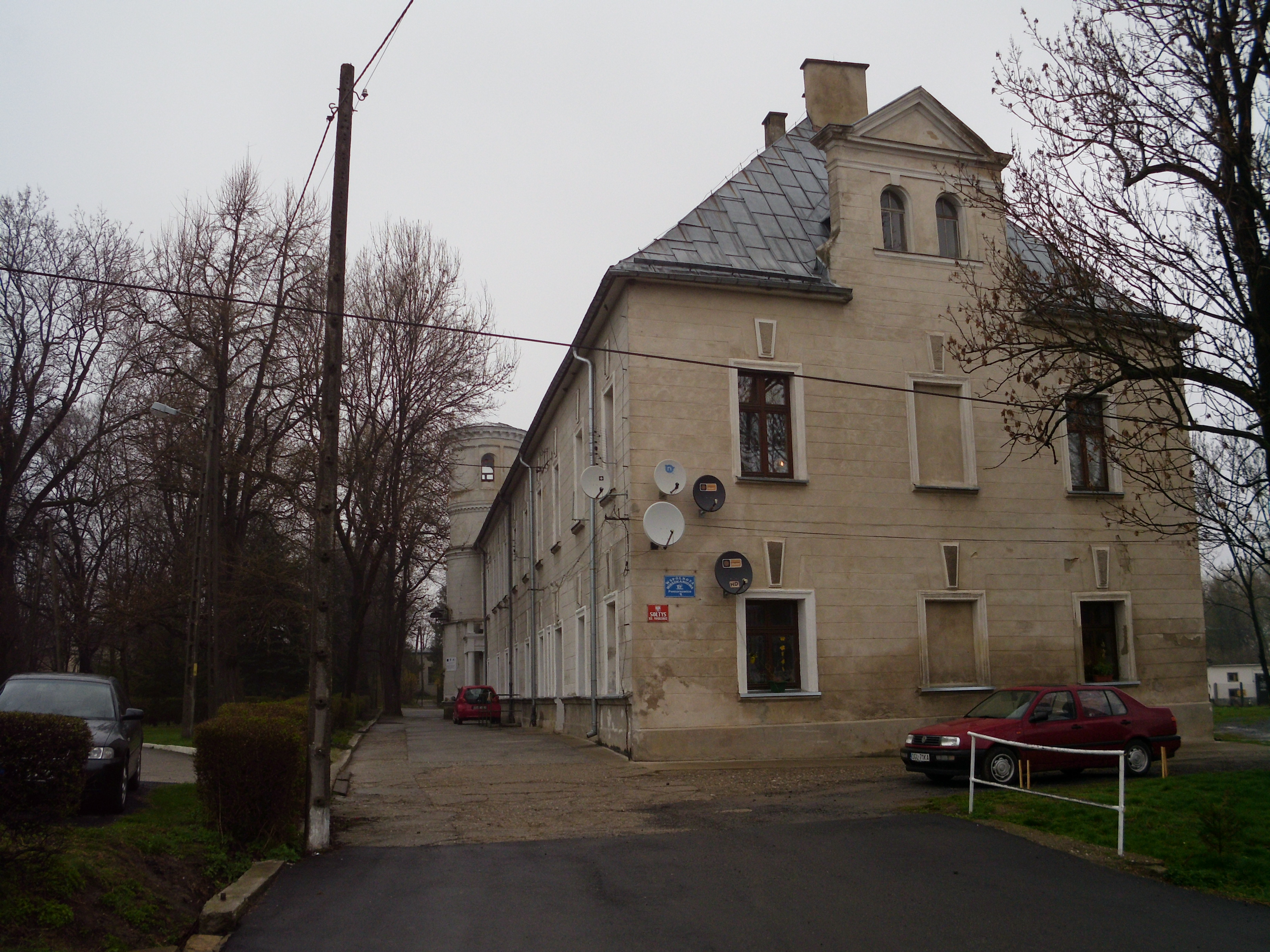
- Former palace in Pomorzowice converted into apartment complex

- Location within Poland
- Coordinates: 50°17′0″N 17°45′39″E
- Country: Poland
- Voivodeship: Opole
- Głubczycki: Głubczyce
- Gmina: Głubczyce
- Time zone: UTC+1 (CET)
  - Summer (DST): UTC+2 (CEST)
- Postal code: 48-100
- Area code: +48 77
- Car plates: OGL

Pomorzowice ([pɔmɔʐɔˈvit͡sɛ]; Czech: Pomorčovice; German: Pommerswitz) is a village located in Poland, in Opole Voivodeship, Głubczyce County and Gmina Głubczyce, near the border with the Czech Republic.
