= Ściborzyce, Lesser Poland Voivodeship =

Ściborzyce
- Location within Poland
- Coordinates: 50°18′N 19°55′E
- Country: Poland
- Voivodeship: Lesser Poland
- County: Olkusz
- Gmina: Trzyciąż
- Time zone: UTC+1 (CET)
  - Summer (DST): UTC+2 (CEST)
- Area code: +48 12
- Car plates: KOL

Ściborzyce [ɕt͡ɕibɔˈʐɨt͡sɛ] is a village located in the Lesser Poland Voivodeship, Olkusz County, Trzyciąż Commune in Poland.
