= Sudice (Opava District) =

- Municipality
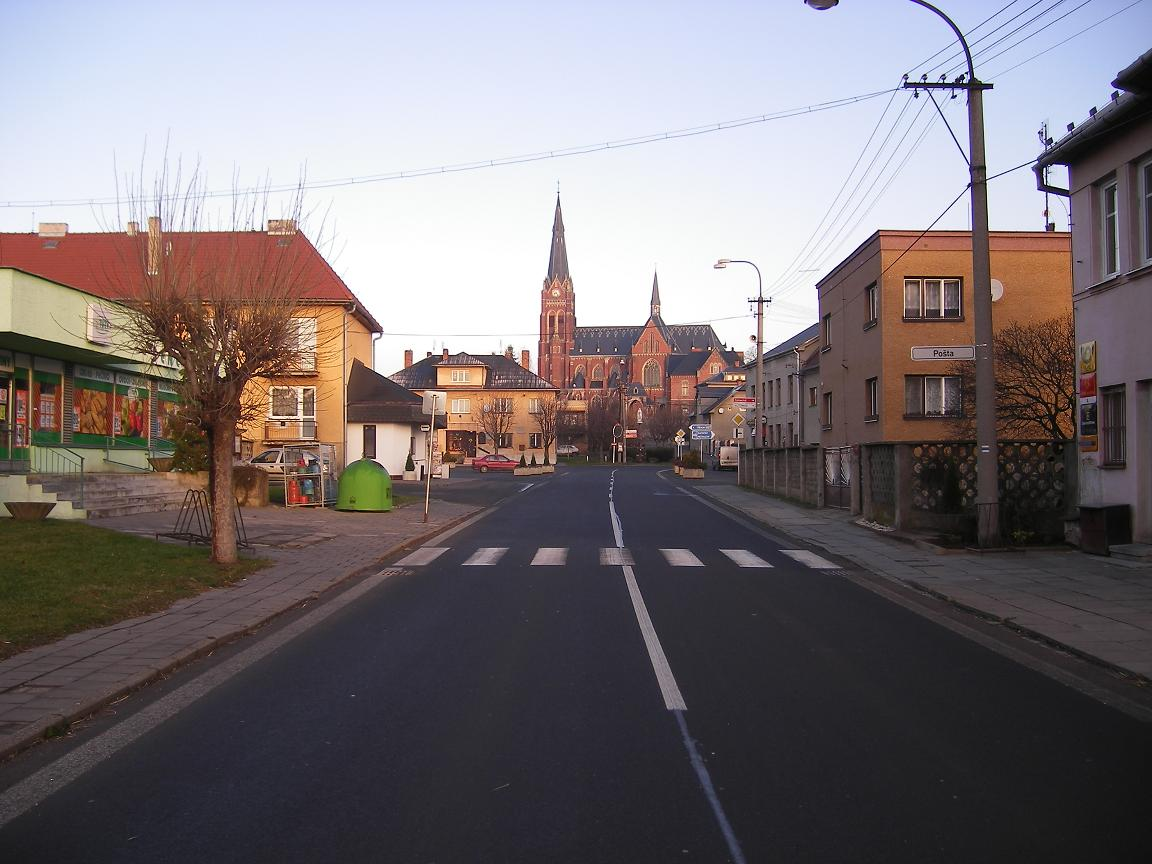
- Centre of Sudice

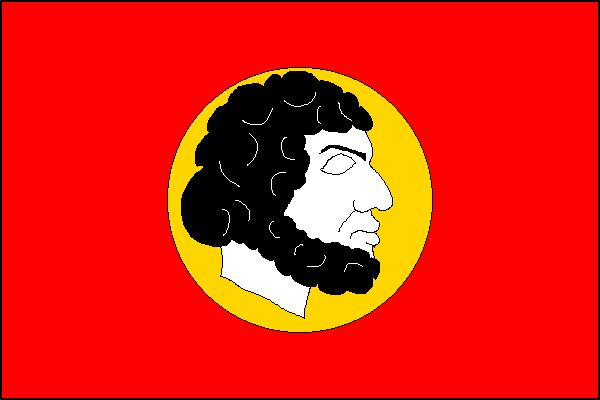
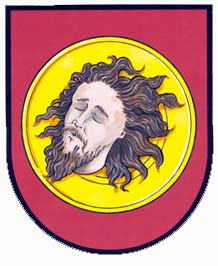
- Flag Coat of arms

- Location in the Czech Republic
- Coordinates: 50°1′54″N 18°4′6″E
- Country: Czech Republic
- Region: Moravian-Silesian Region
- District: Opava
- First mentioned: 1327

Area
  - Total: 9.43 km^{2} (3.64 sq mi)
- Elevation: 244 m (801 ft)

Population (2026-01-01)
  - Total: 635
  - Density: 67.3/km^{2} (174/sq mi)
- Time zone: UTC+1 (CET)
  - Summer (DST): UTC+2 (CEST)
- Postal code: 747 25
- Website: www.obecsudice.cz

Sudice (German: Zauditz, Polish: Sudzice) is a municipality and village in Opava District in the Moravian-Silesian Region of the Czech Republic. It has about 600 inhabitants. It is part of the historic Hlučín Region.

== Geography ==
Sudice is located about 15 kilometres (9 mi) northeast of Opava and 25 km (16 mi) northwest of Ostrava, on the border with Poland. It lies in a flat agricultural landscape in the Opava Hilly Land. The highest point is at 261 m (856 ft) above sea level.

== History ==
The first written mention of Sudice is from 1327, when it was part of the Duchy of Troppau and Duke Nicholas II sold Sudice to the Dominican monastery seated in nearby Racibórz. In the 14th century, a fortress was built.

In the first half of the 16th century, Sudice was promoted to a market town and divided into two parts. In 1557 Sudice was bought by the Oderský of Lidéřov family and reunited the two parts. The fortress was replaced by a Baroque castle in the second half of the 17th century. However, the Henneberk family, who were the next owners of Sudice, had the castle demolished in 1786.

From 1938 to 1945, the municipality was annexed by Nazi Germany. After World War II, the German population was expelled.

== Demographics ==
Historical population

Year	Pop.	±%
1869	1,206	—
1880	1,254	+4.0%
1890	1,192	−4.9%
1900	1,172	−1.7%
1910	1,142	−2.6%

Year	Pop.	±%
1921	1,005	−12.0%
1930	982	−2.3%
1950	588	−40.1%
1961	651	+10.7%
1970	590	−9.4%

Year	Pop.	±%
1980	644	+9.2%
1991	596	−7.5%
2001	661	+10.9%
2011	641	−3.0%
2021	604	−5.8%

Source: Censuses

== Transport ==
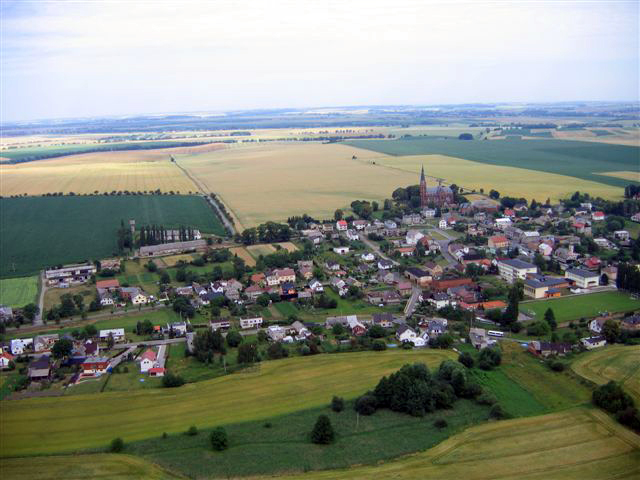
Aerial view

The I/46 road from the Czech–Polish border to Opava and Olomouc runs through the municipality. There are two road border crossings with Poland: Sudice / Pietraszyn and Sudice / Ściborzyce Wielkie.

== Sights ==
The main landmark of Sudice is the pseudo-Gothic Church of Saint John the Baptist from the early 20th century. The entire church complex is a cultural monument.
