= Ściborzyce Małe =

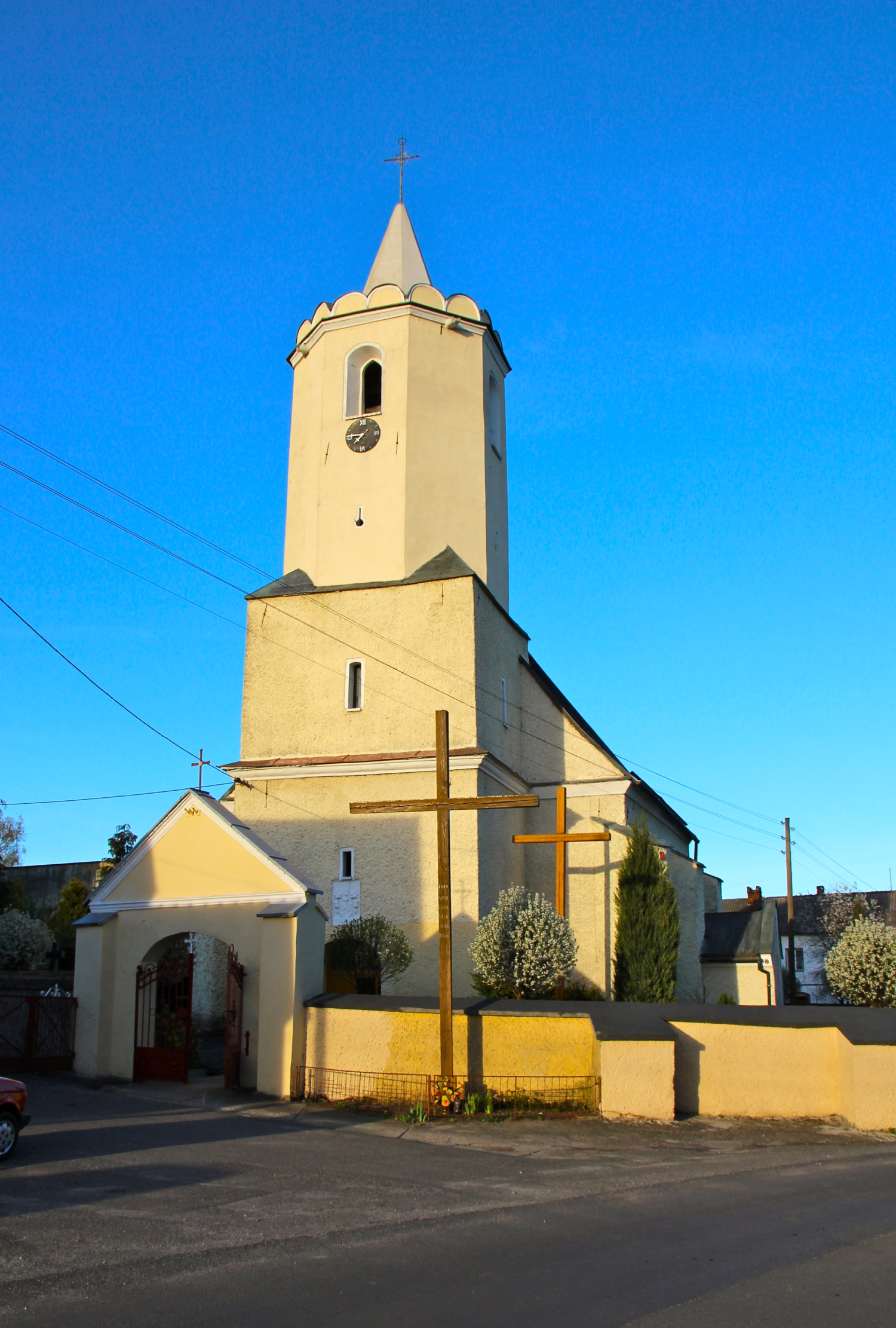

- Location within Poland
- Coordinates: 50°16′9″N 17°46′35″E
- Country: Poland
- Voivodeship: Opole
- County: Głubczyce
- Gmina: Głubczyce
- Time zone: UTC+1 (CET)
  - Summer (DST): UTC+2 (CEST)
- Area code: +48 77
- Car plates: OGL

Ściborzyce Małe [ɕt͡ɕibɔˈʐɨt͡sɛ ˈmawɛ] is a village located in the Opole Voivodeship (south-western Poland), near the border with the Czech Republic. It belongs to the Głubczyce County and Gmina Głubczyce.
