= Ściborzyce Wielkie =

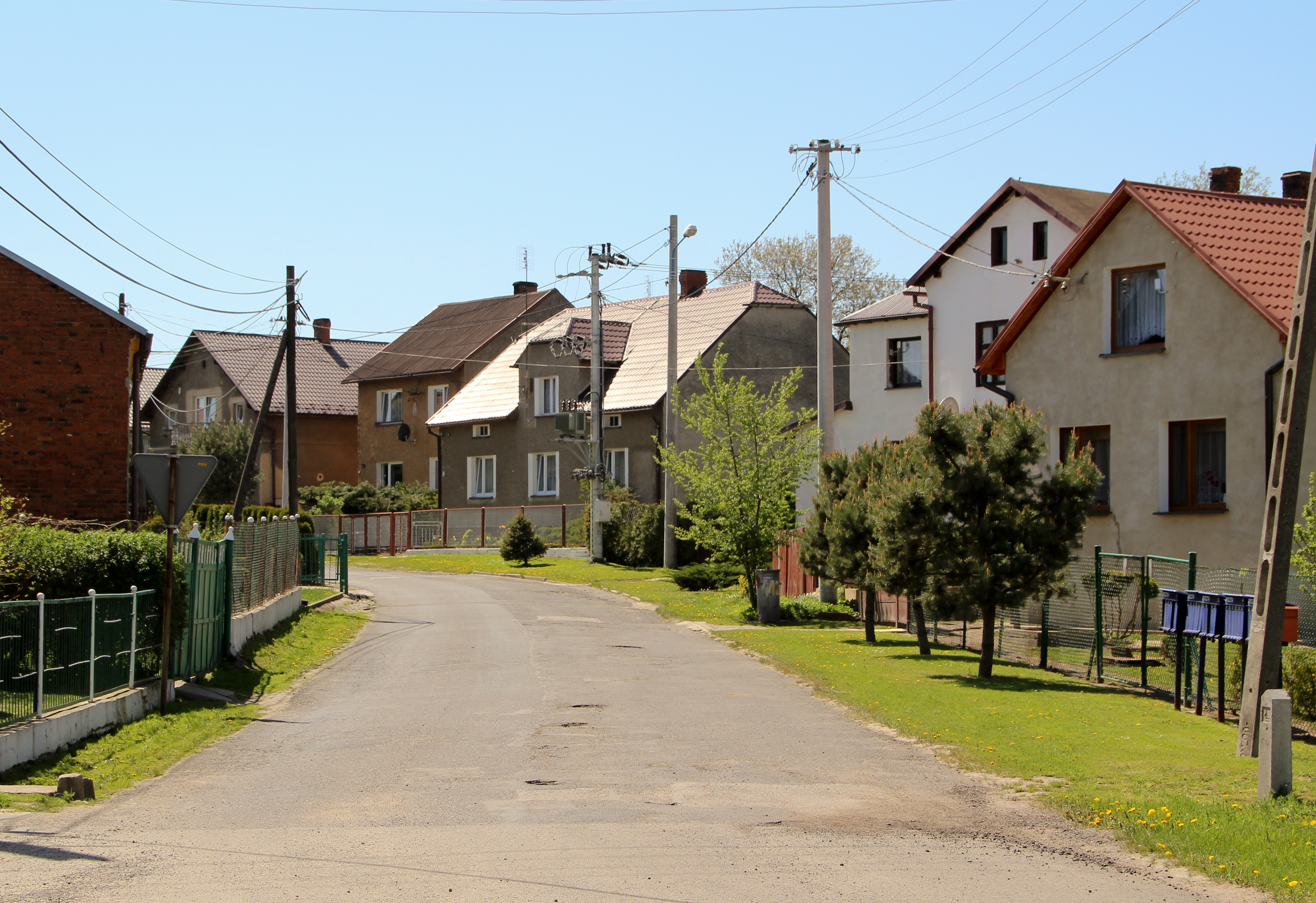
- Interactive map of Ściborzyce Wielkie
- Location within Poland
- Coordinates: 50°1′N 18°2′E
- Country: Poland
- Voivodeship: Opole Voivodeship
- County: Głubczyce
- Gmina: Kietrz

Population (2007)
  - Total: 506
- Time zone: UTC+1 (CET)
  - Summer (DST): UTC+2 (CEST)
- Area code: +48 77
- Car plates: OGL

Ściborzyce Wielkie [ɕt͡ɕibɔˈʐɨt͡sɛ ˈvjɛlkjɛ] is a village in the administrative district of Gmina Kietrz, within Głubczyce County, Opole Voivodeship, in south-western Poland, close to the Czech border.
