= 65th Rifle Division =

65th Rifle Division 102nd Guards Rifle Division
- Active: 1931–1944
- Country: Soviet Union
- Branch: Red Army
- Type: Infantry
- Engagements: World War II: Lyuban Offensive Operation; Leningrad-Novgorod Offensive; Vyborg-Petrozavodsk Offensive; Petsamo-Kirkenes Offensive; East Pomeranian Offensive
- Decorations: Order of the Red Banner; Order of Suvorov
- Battle honours: Novgorod

Commanders
- Notable commanders: Pyotr Koshevoy

The 65th Rifle Division was an infantry division of the Soviet Union's Red Army.

== Prewar service ==
The 65th Territorial Rifle Division was formed in May 1931, based in Tyumen, Kamyshlov, and Ishim. The division included the 193rd, 194th, and 195th Rifle Regiments, the 65th Artillery Regiment, a tank battalion, reconnaissance and sapper companies, and anti-aircraft and anti-tank batteries. The division headquarters was in Tyumen in a two-story house on Republic street, and the barracks of the 193rd Rifle Regiment in a former indoor market on the neighboring Lenin street. M. I. Glukhov was appointed first commander of the division, and was succeeded by Grigory F. Gavryushenko in May 1932. in January 1934 the best six skiers of the unit led by Gavryushenko skied from Tyumen to Moscow to report to the 17th Congress of the Communist Party, and a year later this route was repeated by the wives of the commanders of the division – the "daring five" as they were known in Tyumen.

During the expansion of the Red Army in 1939, the 193rd Rifle Regiment was used to form a new 65th Rifle Division in Tyumen during July 1939, in accordance with a 9 July directive of the Ural Military District. The 110th and 128th Rifle Divisions were formed from the other two rifle regiments of the 65th Territorial Rifle Division between July and September 1939.

From 13 July to 1 August 1939 the division was relocated to Transbaikalia, based northeast of the Matsievskaya station where the construction of dugouts was begun. The division became part of the 12th Rifle Corps of the Transbaikal Military District on 18 September. On 10 October the mobilized personnel began to be discharged and the division shifted to peacetime strength. The division was reorganized as the 65th Motorized Division on 25 January 1940 but again reverted to a rifle division on 26 April.

== World War II ==
When Operation Barbarossa began on 22 June 1941 the division was located in Chita Oblast at Matsievskaya station, then relocated to the Solovyovsk–Otpor area. Until October it remained in the Transbaikal Military District, which became the Transbaikal Front on 15 September. From 20 October the division began departing in echelons from Dauriya station, and on 30 October unloaded in Kuybyshev for the parade there on 7 November. After the parade, on the next day, 8 November, the division boarded trains again and was sent through Yaroslavl, Vologda, Cherepovets to the Tikhvin sector, where on 12 November it unloaded at the Bolshoy Dvor station and deployed on the southeast approaches to Tikhvin. Included in the 4th Separate Army, the division fought in positional battles near Tikhvin until mid-November, and from 19 November in the Tikhvin offensive. Having taken the outskirts of that city from the southeast, the division ran into strong defenses between 24 and 26 November. From 1 to 7 December the city was stormed and its liberation was declared on 9 December. The 65th formed the main force in the liberation of the city. For its "exemplary performance of combat objectives" during the offensive and its "courage and heroism," the division was awarded the Order of the Red Banner on 17 December.

Fought near Leningrad and in the Petsamo-Kirkenes Operation.

From 14 August to 6 October 1944 the division was in the army reserve, receiving reinforcements and conducting training. From 7 October the division fought in the Petsamo–Kirkenes offensive to liberate the Polar region as part of the 99th Rifle Corps. The 65th was part of the main attack for the breakthrough of strong German fortified defenses and strongpoints on the heights dominating and covering the main direction of the enemy towards Bolshoy Karikvayvish, Luostari, and Petsamo. On the first day of the offensive the division, operating on the right flank, broke through the German defenses. On the morning of the second day it captured the powerful strongpoint on the Bolshoy Karikvayvish mountain. Then it took six similar strongpoints on the dominating heights. By the morning of the third day of the offensive the division had penetrated German defenses to a depth of 5–6 kilometers, assault-crossed the Titovka river, and began the pursuit of defeated small German units. The division advanced 20 kilometers into the German rear by 12 October and captured Luostari airfield. During the operation the division defeated two battalions of the 137th Regiment of the German 2nd Mountain Division, inflicted heavy losses on the 111th Reserve Battalion, Bicycle Brigade Norway, the 111th Mountain Artillery Regiment and the support troops of the 2nd Mountain Division, capturing 97 soldiers and officers in addition to large quantities of equipment.

Became the 102nd Guards Rifle Division on 29 December 1944.

In January 1945, the division was transferred to the Grodno area and included in the 19th Army of the 2nd Belorussian Front. In February - early April, the division took part in the East Pomeranian Offensive, during which, in cooperation with other formations of the army, on February 26, it captured the town of Schlochau (Człuchów) and at the beginning of March reached the Baltic Sea near Koszalin.

In late March - early April, the division participated in the capture of the naval base and the port of Gdynia and liberation of the "Polish Corridor". Subsequently, until the beginning of May, the division conducted operations to block and destroy enemy troops on the western coast of the Danzig Bay.

In 1945-46, the division performed occupation duty on the demarcation line of the Mecklenburg province, and was disbanded in 1947.

== Components ==
The division included the following units.

- 38th Rifle Regiment
- 60th Rifle Regiment
- 311th Rifle Regiment
- 6th Guards Artillery Regiment (former 127th Artillery Regiment)
- 172nd Howitzer Artillery Regiment (to 28 January 1942)
- 167th Separate Anti-Tank Battalion
- 367th Anti-Aircraft Artillery Battery (former 350th Separate Anti-Aircraft Artillery Battalion)
- 23rd Reconnaissance Company
- Ski Battalion (from 13 October 1942 to 10 April 1943)
- 74th Sapper Battalion
- 104th Separate Communications Battalion (former 782nd Separate Communications Company)
- 54th Medical Battalion
- 210th Separate Chemical Defence Company
- 230th Motor Transport Company
- 163rd Field Bakery (former 95th Field Mobile Bakery)
- 199th Divisional Veterinary Hospital
- 41st Divisional Artillery Workshop
- 98th Field Post Office
- 281st Field Cash Office of the State Bank
