= Zygmunt Vogel =

Polish illustrator, educator, and painter (1764–1826)

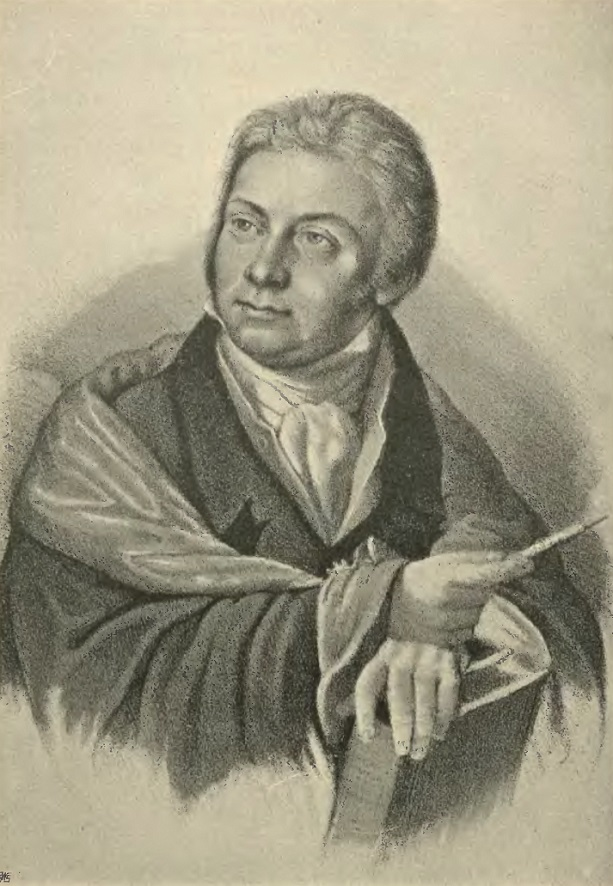
Zygmunt Vogel; portrait by Jan Feliks Piwarski

Zygmunt Vogel (15 June 1764 – 20 April 1826) was a Polish illustrator, educator, and painter in the classical style. He was sometimes called Ptaszek (Polish for "Bird"): a reference to his name (which means "bird" in German) and to the many years that he traveled almost continuously.

== Biography ==
His father was a chef for Prince Michał Fryderyk Czartoryski and died while Zygmunt was still a small child. After that, he and his mother came under the care of the Prince. When he was older, he was sent to Warsaw to study science with the aim of becoming an architect. At the age of sixteen, however, Stanisław Potocki (who had just returned from Rome and would later become a prominent art collector) introduced him to the works of Bernardo Bellotto.

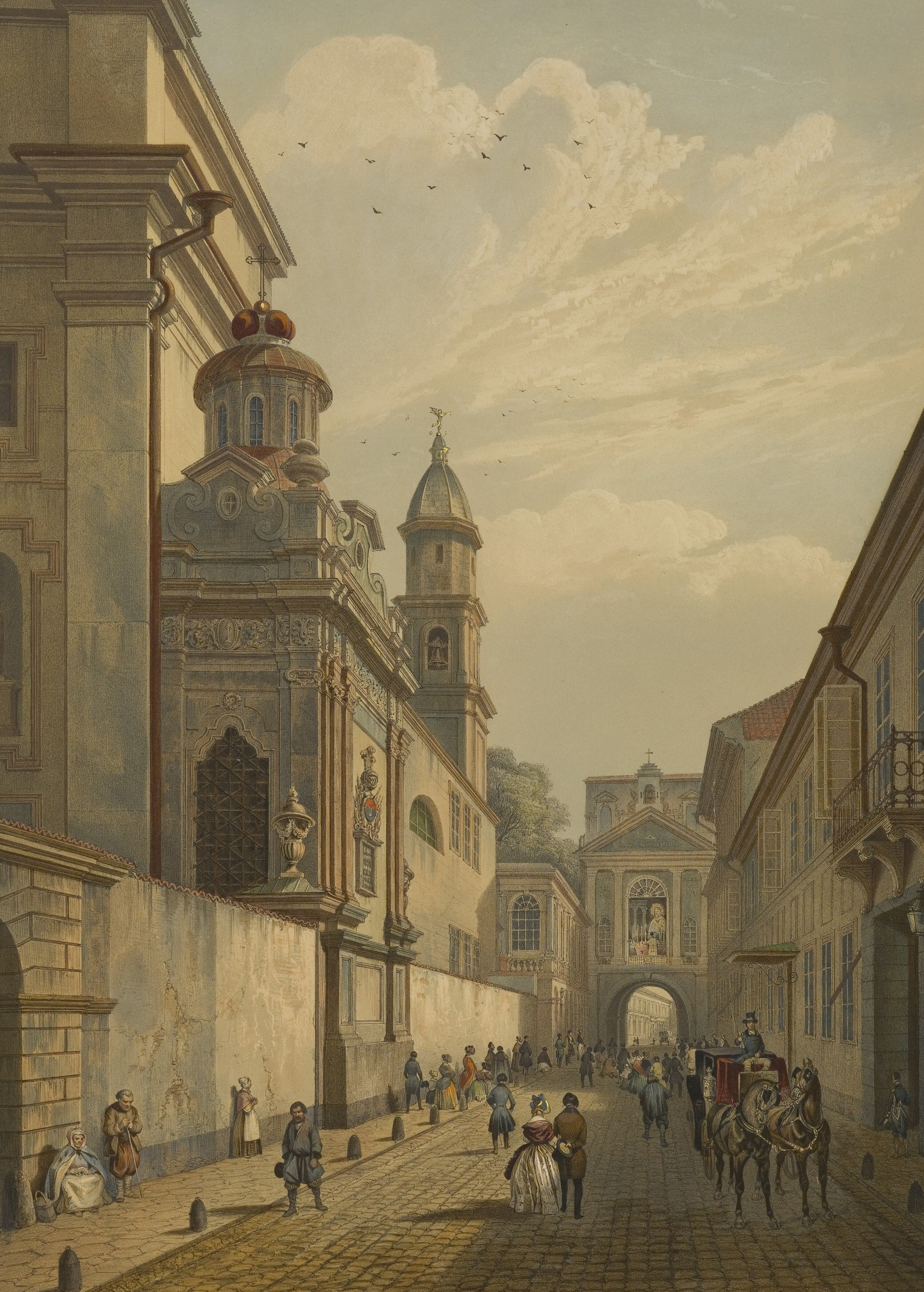
The East Gate in Wilno

Vogel decided that he would rather be a cityscape painter. He was admitted to the Royal School of Painting, under the direction of Marcello Bacciarelli. At first, he created works in Bellotto's style, on commission from Count Michał Jerzy Mniszech, but soon developed his own style to create scenes of Warsaw. Rather than using oils, he used watercolors, ink and pencil.

In 1787, he gained the patronage of King Stanisław II August. His first commission involved travelling to Krzeszowice, Alwernia, Olkusz, Rabsztyn, Pieskowa Skała and other locations to collect historical materials. Upon his return, he used his sketches to create an album of 63 drawings and watercolors, which were published in 1806 by Jan Zachariasz Frey (together with some of his own engravings, based on Vogel's drawings).

After that, he was dispatched to Danzig (now Gdańsk) and spent two years there, although few of his paintings from that period survive. In the following years, he traveled throughout the country, painting castles, towns and estates. His first cycle of ten works was commissioned by his old acquaintance, Potocki, for a new summer residence near Olesin. Despite his wanderings, he participated in the King's Thursday Dinners whenever possible.

After the King's abdication, Vogel was forced to seek regular employment. He began as a teacher at the Warsaw Lyceum. In 1817, he was named to the chair for perspective in the Department of Fine Arts at the University of Warsaw; a position he retained for the rest of his life. Among his best-known students were Aleksander Kokular and Franciszek Pfanhauser. In 1818, he was awarded the Order of Saint Stanislaus.

== Selected paintings ==
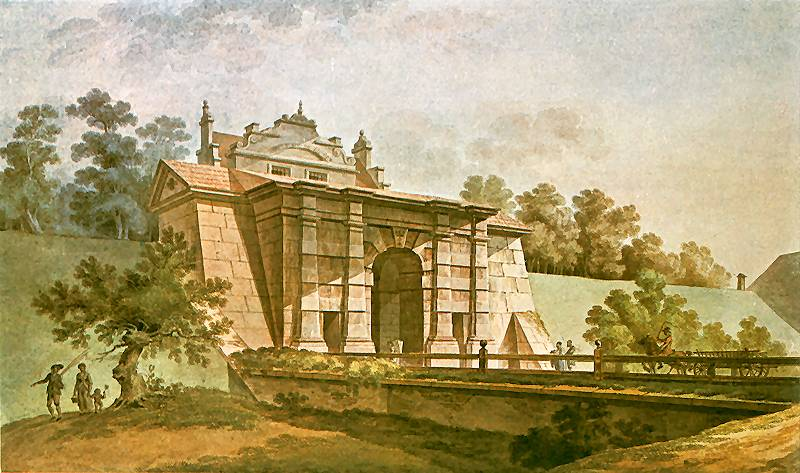
The Lowland Gate in Gdańsk

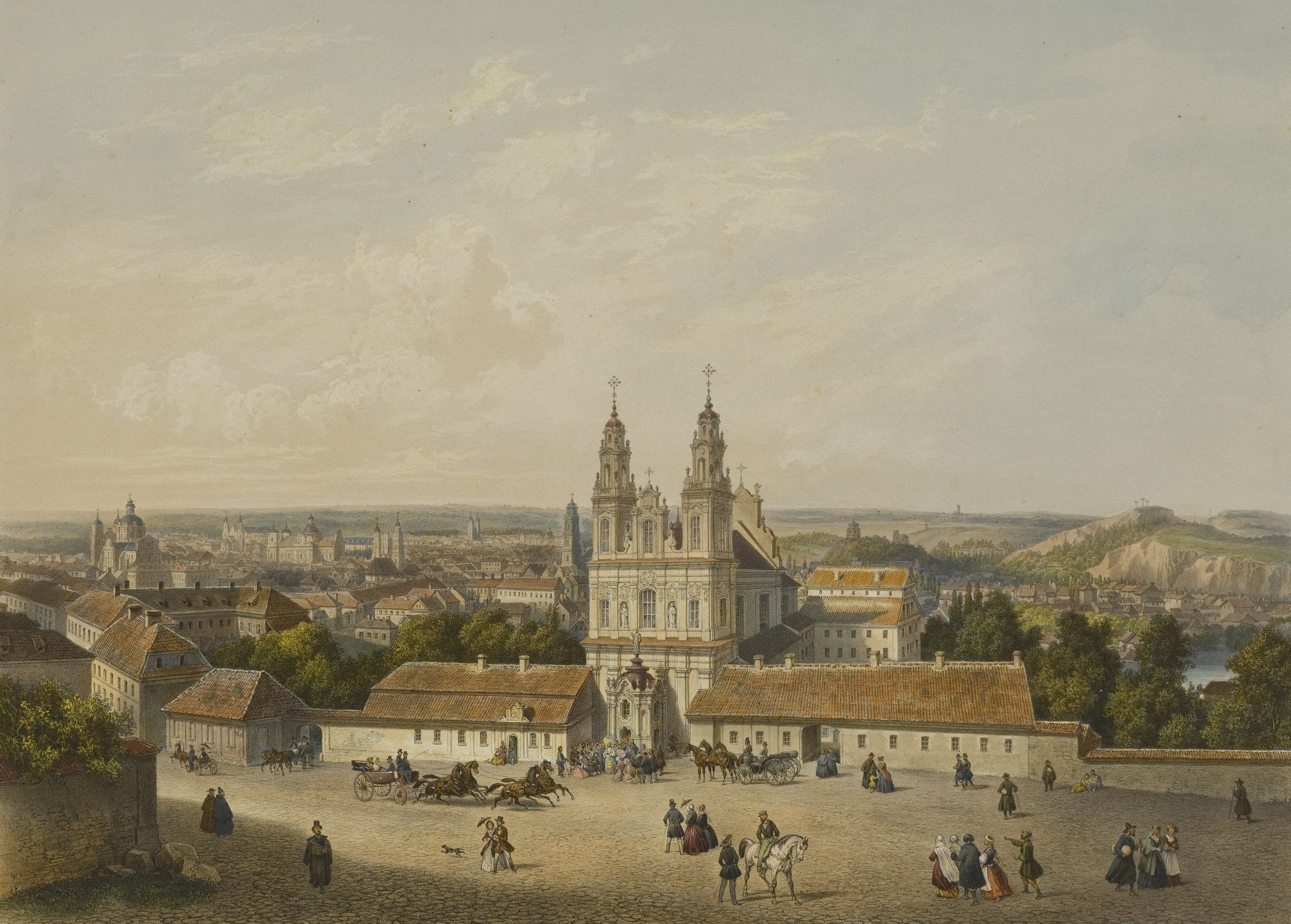
Church of the Ascension in Wilno

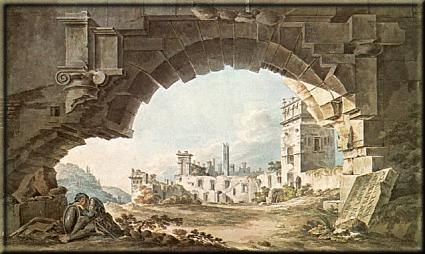
Castle in Kazimierz Dolny

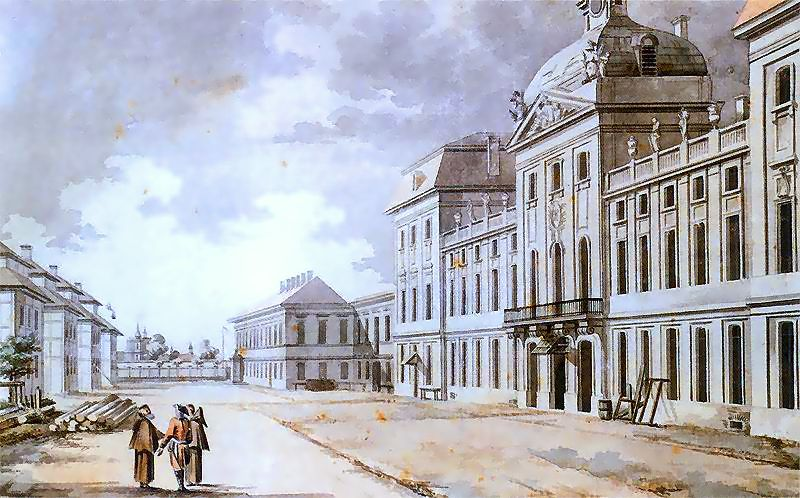
Corps of Cadets (Warsaw)
