= Olkusz Ghetto =

World Wars II Jewish ghetto

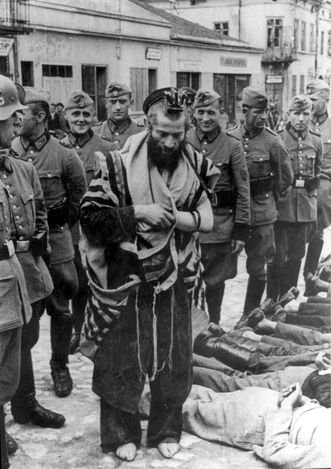
Rabbi Moshe Hagerman is attacked by German soldiers during "Bloody Monday", 31 July 1940

Olkusz Ghetto was a ghetto for the Jewish population that existed in Olkusz during the German occupation of Poland.

The ghetto was created in September 1941 and encompassed the north-eastern part of the city, as well as the nearby villages of Parczew, Sikorka and Słowiki. At the end of its existence, it had about 3.4 thousand residents. In June 1942, it was liquidated by the Germans, and most of its inhabitants were killed in gas chambers, most likely in the Auschwitz II Birkenau extermination camp.

== See also ==
- Bloody Wednesday of Olkusz
