= Witeradów =

- Village
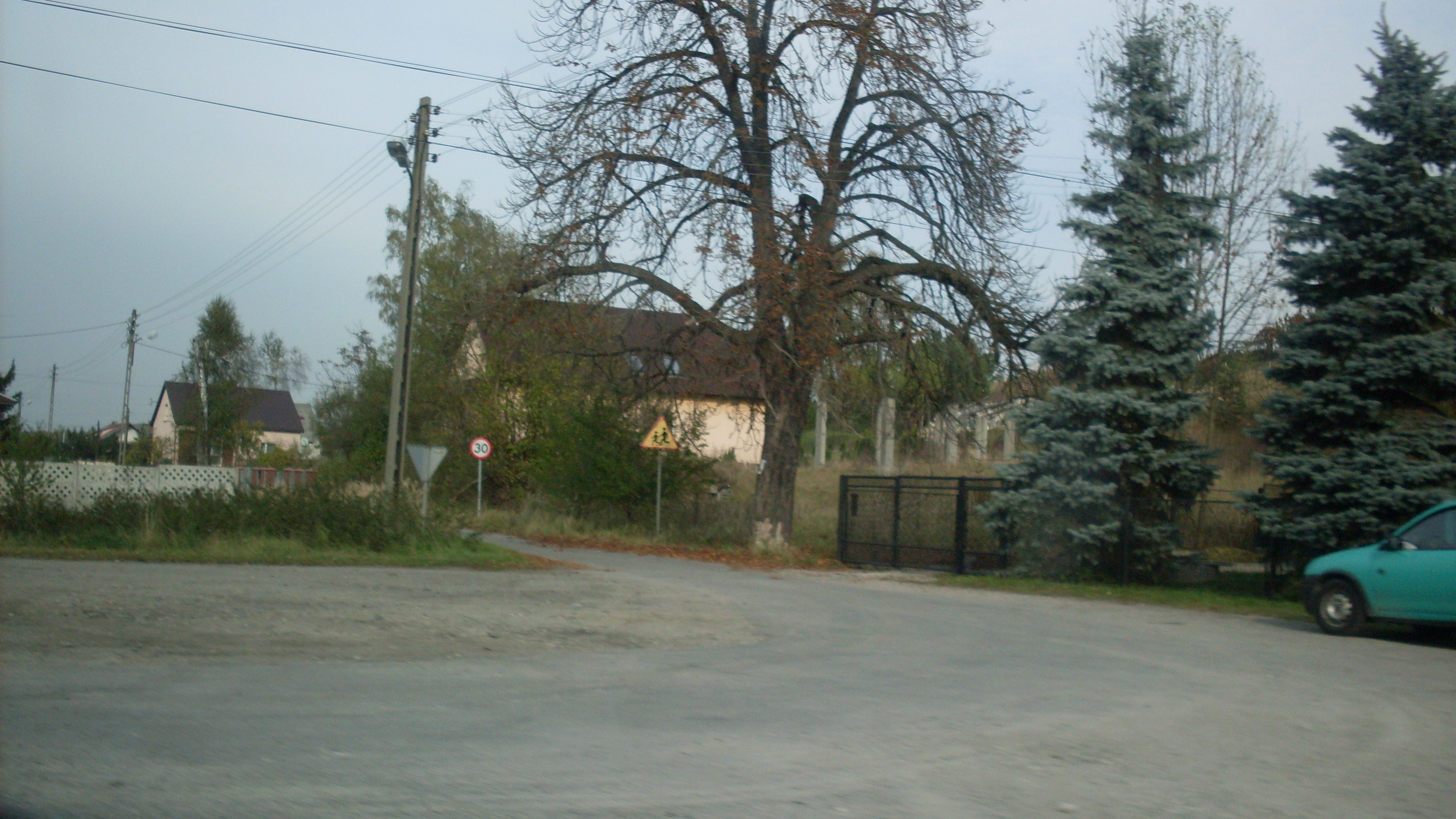

- Location within Poland
- Coordinates: 50°15′N 19°35′E
- Country: Poland
- Voivodeship: Lesser Poland
- County: Olkusz
- Gmina: Olkusz
- Time zone: UTC+1 (CET)
  - Summer (DST): UTC+2 (CEST)
- Vehicle registration: KOL

Witeradów [vitɛˈraduf] is a village in the administrative district of Gmina Olkusz, within Olkusz County, Lesser Poland Voivodeship, in southern Poland.

In 1973, a part of the village was separated and included within the town limits of Olkusz.
