= Niesułowice =

Niesułowice may refer to the following places in Poland:

- Niesułowice, Lower Silesian Voivodeship (south-west Poland)
- Niesułowice, Lesser Poland Voivodeship (south Poland)
