= Braciejówka =

- Village
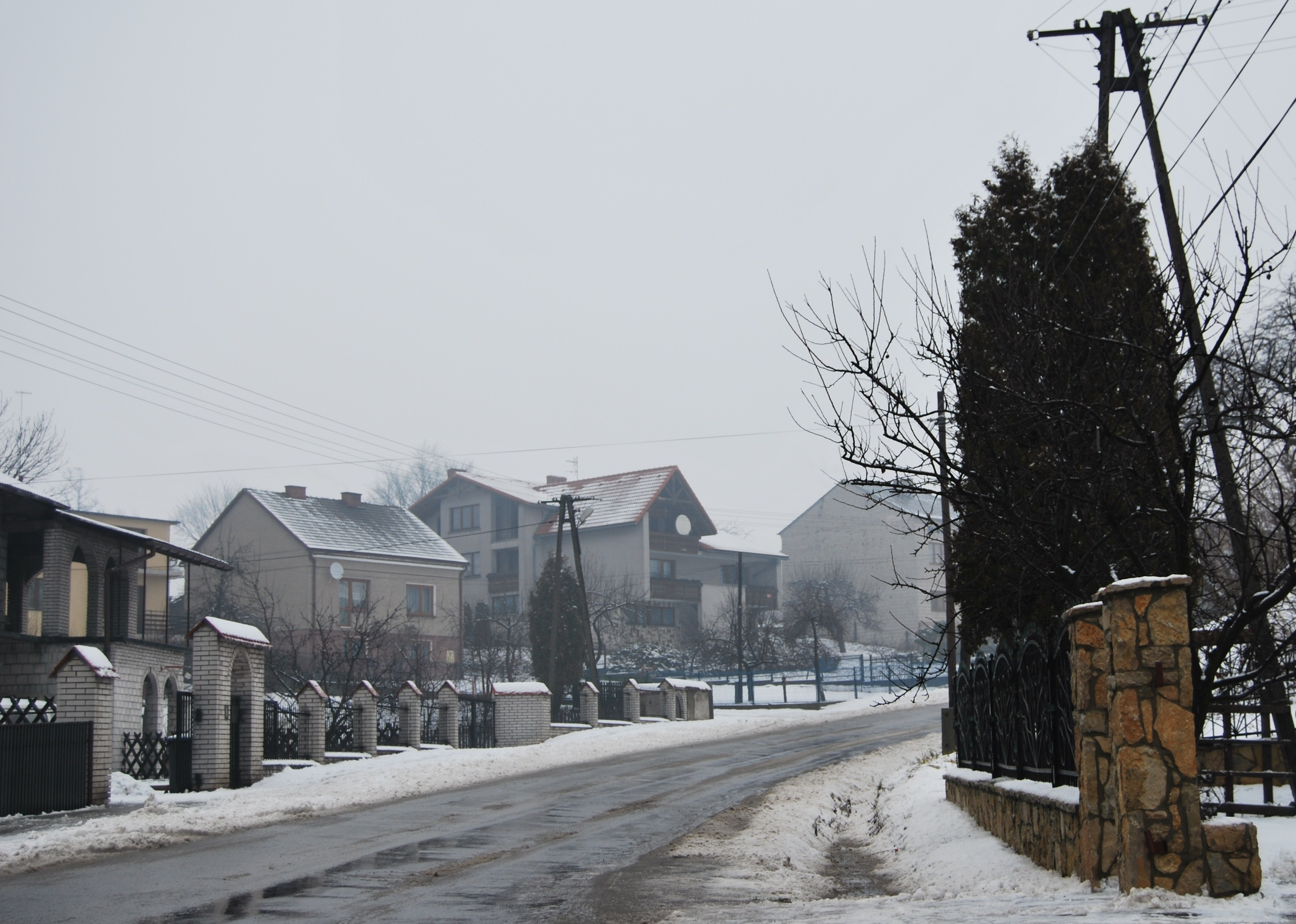

- Location within Poland
- Coordinates: 50°19′N 19°40′E
- Country: Poland
- Voivodeship: Lesser Poland
- County: Olkusz
- Gmina: Olkusz

Braciejówka [brat͡ɕɛˈjufka] is a village in the administrative district of Gmina Olkusz, within Olkusz County, Lesser Poland Voivodeship, in southern Poland.
