= Zederman =

- Village
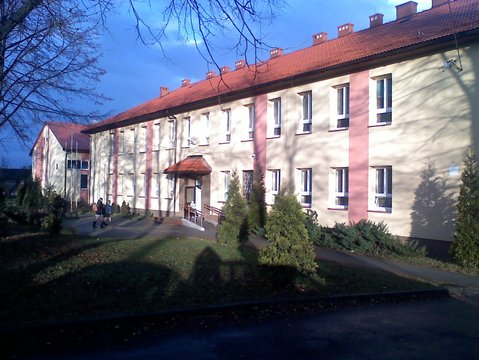
- School

- Location within Poland
- Coordinates: 50°15′N 19°41′E
- Country: Poland
- Voivodeship: Lesser Poland
- County: Olkusz
- Gmina: Olkusz
- Population: 1,300

Zederman [zɛˈdɛrman] is a village in the administrative district of Gmina Olkusz, within Olkusz County, Lesser Poland Voivodeship, in southern Poland.
