= Franciszek Pfanhauser =

Polish painter, teacher, art collector and restorer (1796–1865)

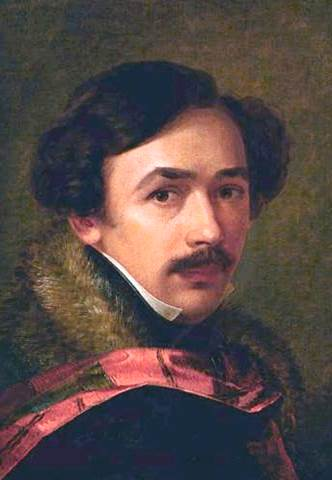
Self-portrait (c.1825/30)

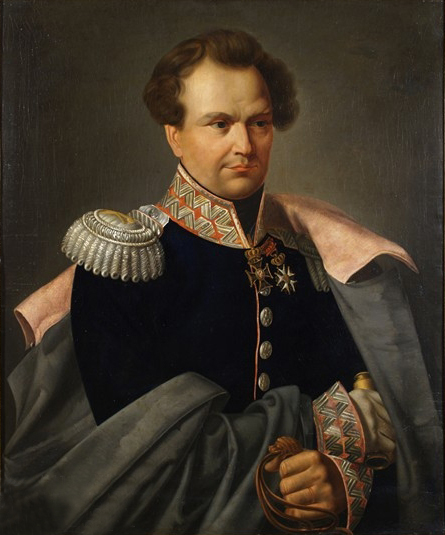
Portrait of General Skrzynecki

Franciszek Pfanhauser (27 December 1796 – 1865) was a Polish painter, teacher, art collector and restorer, known mostly for his portraits.

== Biography ==
He was born in Warsaw. His father was a well-to-do craftsman who had emigrated from Austria. He began his art studies at the Warsaw Lyceum with Zygmunt Vogel and Marcello Bacciarelli. In 1817, he enrolled with the Faculty of Fine Arts at the University of Warsaw. Later, he received government scholarships that enabled him to study in Vienna and Rome; sending back paintings for exhibitions in Warsaw. Initially, he sent copies of works by Titian and Correggio but, by 1825, was sending original compositions, including renditions of Władysław Jagiełło marrying Jadwiga and the blind Oedipus being led by Antigone.

After his scholarships expired in 1830, he remained in Rome at his own expense. He returned to Poland in 1834 and, three years later, married a painter named Amelia Lepigé, who he had met at an art auction. At that time, he began to specialize in portraits. Some of his notable sitters included Maria Szymanowska and General Jan Zygmunt Skrzynecki.

Later, he also painted religious works; notably an "Adoration of the Magi" for St. John's Archcathedral (destroyed in 1944). Many of his works were, in fact, lost or destroyed during the Second World War.

In the late 1830s, he did restorative work at the gallery in Łazienki Palace. He was also an avid art collector and owned works by Raphael, Rubens and Rembrandt. In 1844, a major exhibit of his collection took place in Saint Petersburg. In 1836, he established his own art school, which he operated until 1848, when he and his wife emigrated to Italy in the wake of the Greater Poland Uprising. After that, he apparently cut off all ties with Poland and seems to have focused on collecting art and antiquities, rather than painting. He died in 1865 in Florence.
