= Gmina Olkusz =

Gmina Olkusz Olkusz Commune
- Gmina
- Coat of arms
- Interactive map of Gmina Olkusz
- Coordinates (Olkusz): 50°17′N 19°34′E
- Country: Poland
- Voivodeship: Lesser Poland
- County: Olkusz
- Seat: Olkusz

Area
  - Total: 150.66 km^{2} (58.17 sq mi)

Population (2006)
  - Total: 50,289
  - Density: 333.79/km^{2} (864.52/sq mi)
  - Urban: 37,552
  - Rural: 12,737
- Website: http://www.umig.olkusz.pl/

Gmina Olkusz is an urban-rural gmina (administrative district) in Olkusz County, Lesser Poland Voivodeship, in southern Poland. Its seat is the town of Olkusz, which lies approximately 37 kilometres (23 mi) north-west of the regional capital Kraków.

The gmina covers an area of 150.66 square kilometres (58.2 sq mi), and as of 2006 its total population is 50,289 (out of which the population of Olkusz amounts to 37,552, and the population of the rural part of the gmina is 12,737).

The gmina contains part of the protected area called Kraków Valleys Landscape Park.

== Villages ==
Apart from the town of Olkusz, Gmina Olkusz contains the villages and settlements of Bogucin Mały, Braciejówka, Gorenice, Kogutek Kosmołowski, Kosmolów, Niesułowice, Olewin, Osiek, Pazurek, Podlesie, Rabsztyn, Sieniczno, Troks, Wiśliczka, Witeradów, Zawada, Zederman, Zimnodół and Żurada.

== Neighbouring gminas ==
Gmina Olkusz is bordered by the town of Bukowno and by the gminas of Bolesław, Jerzmanowice-Przeginia, Klucze, Krzeszowice, Sułoszowa, Trzebinia, Trzyciąż and Wolbrom.
