= Gorenice =

- Village
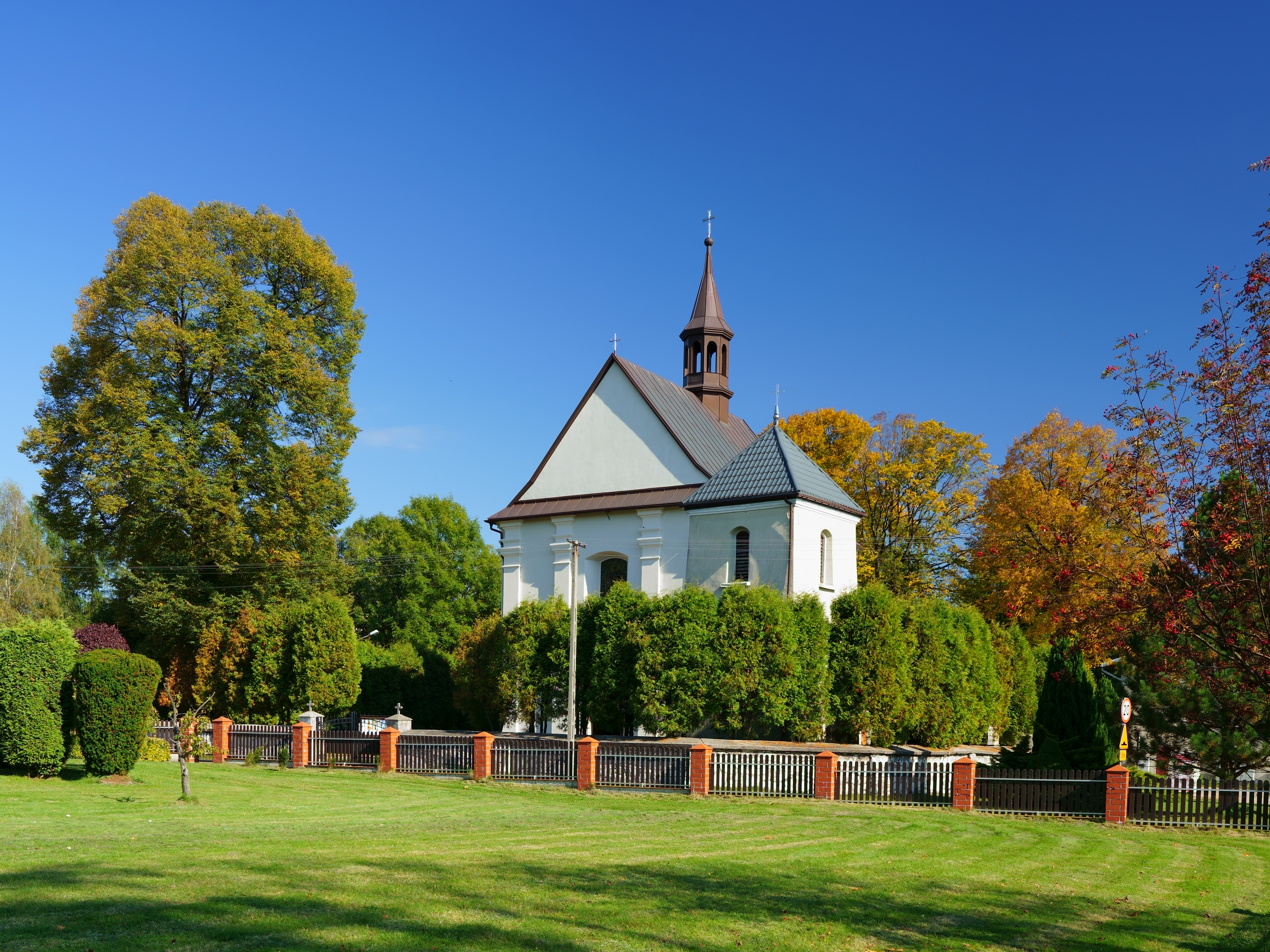
- Church of Saint Nicholas

- Location within Poland
- Coordinates: 50°12′23″N 19°37′20″E
- Country: Poland
- Voivodeship: Lesser Poland
- County: Olkusz
- Gmina: Olkusz

Population (approx.)
  - Total: 1,350
- Website: http://www.gorenice.pl

Gorenice [ɡɔrɛˈnit͡sɛ] is a village in the administrative district of Gmina Olkusz, within Olkusz County, Lesser Poland Voivodeship, in southern Poland.

The village has an approximate population of 1,350.
