= Kosmolów =

- Village
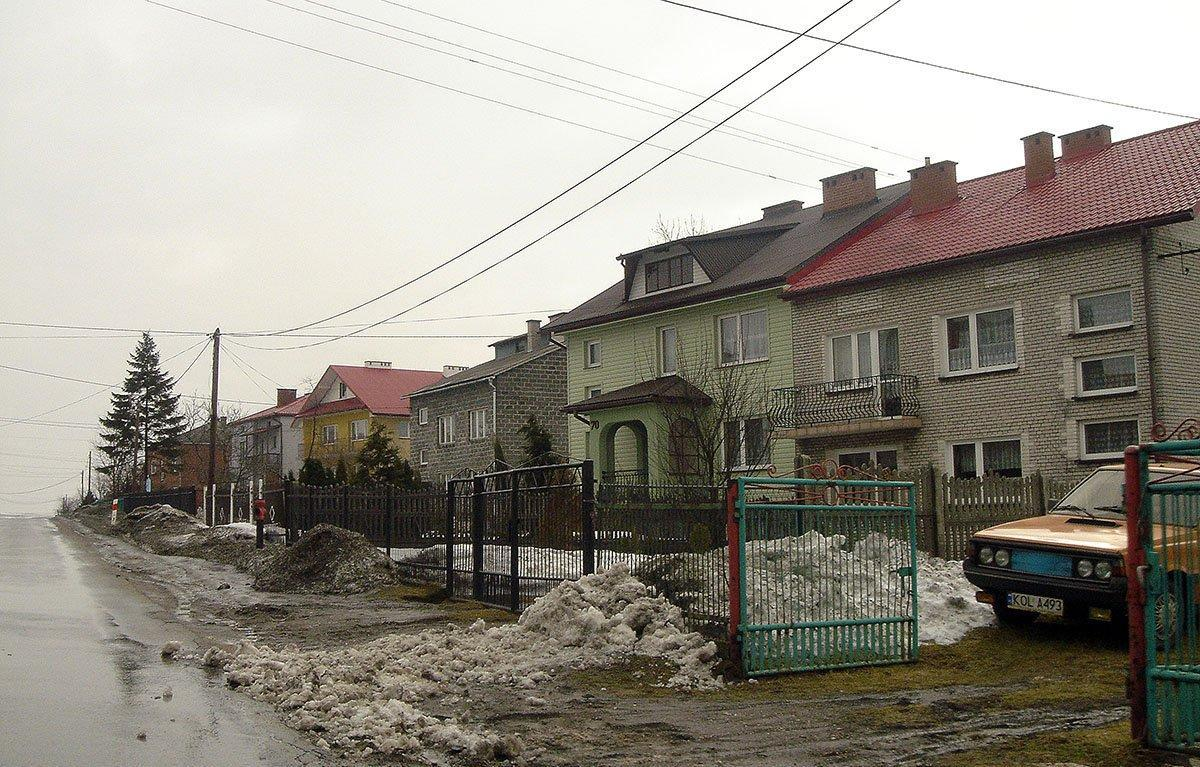
- Houses by the wayside in Kosmolów

- Location within Poland
- Coordinates: 50°16′00″N 19°39′00″E
- Country: Poland
- Voivodeship: Lesser Poland
- County: Olkusz
- Gmina: Olkusz

Population
  - Total: 940

Kosmolów [kɔsˈmɔluf] is a village in the administrative district of Gmina Olkusz, within Olkusz County, Lesser Poland Voivodeship, in southern Poland.
