= Starczynów Desert =

Desert in Poland

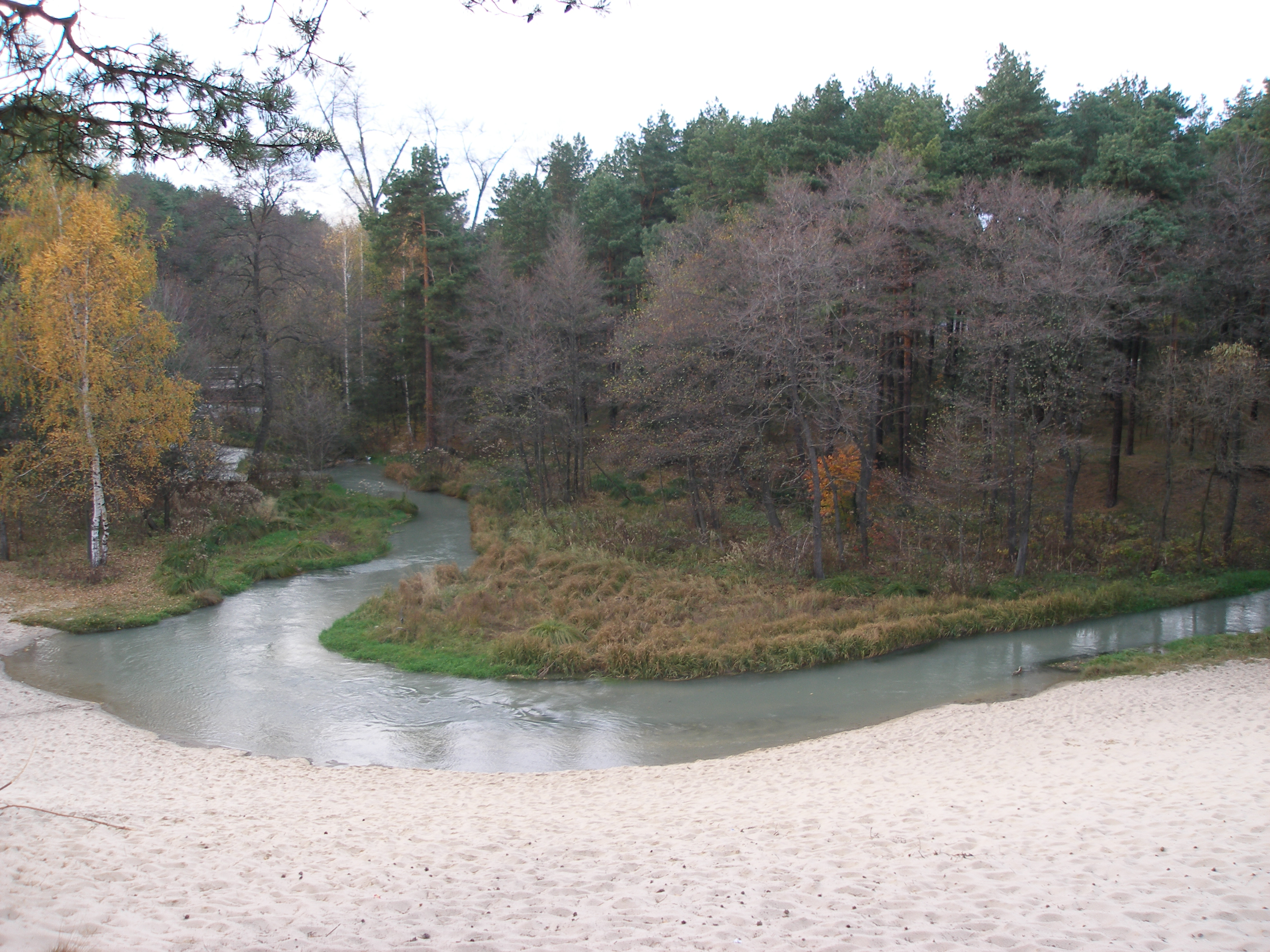
- Area: 5 km^{2} (1.9 mi^{2})

Naming
- Native name: Pustynia Starczynowska (Polish)

Geography
- Country: Poland
- Coordinates: 50°15′46″N 19°27′34″E
- Interactive map of Starczynów Desert

The Starczynów Desert (Polish: Pustynia Starczynowska) is an area of formerly exposed but now largely overgrown sand dunes in the Silesian upland between Olkusz and Bukowno in the Malopolska Voivodeship, southern Poland. The desert takes its name from the former village of Starczynów, which was merged into Bukowno in 1958.

== History ==
Prior to the 12th century the sandy deposits of the area were covered by dense forest. The desert is believed to have been created by sand deposits becoming exposed due to the combined effect of tree-felling from the 13th century onwards, Zinc and Lead mining in the area (for which trees were felled to provide pit-props and to fuel smelting operations), fire-break roads being cut through overlying forest, and periods of high winds in the 13th-15th centuries, the 16th-17th centuries, the turn of 18th and 19th centuries, and that of 20th and 21st centuries. Dunes first formed in the area around the 14th-15th centuries. More dunes formed in the 16th century when draining of the area and further cutting of trees to make pit-props lead to more exposure of sand-deposits. When the ore industry in the area collapsed in the late 17th and early 18th centuries they may have become overgrown thus fixing them. Renewed activity in the late 18th century and early 19th century appears to have led to renewed deforestation and further formation of dunes. By 1815 Olkusz was described as being "surrounded by [a] sand sea".

By the 1930s the sand-covered area extended over 5 square kilometres, with wind-blown sand becoming a problem for the people of Olkusz. This led to a 1949 decision to extensively plant the area with pine and Caspian willow in order to fix the sand in place preventing further wind-blown sand in Olkusz, resulting in the present over-grown state of the desert. However the desert was temporarily re-exposed by fires in 1992 and 2013, and regrowth of trees in the area is hindered by the poor quality of the soil.

== Geology ==
The sandy deposits formed as a result of fluvio-glacial, fluvial-proluvial, or fluvial-deluvial action in the area. Particularly the sands in the eastern part of the "desert" (where the river Sztola lies) are assumed to be the result of fluvial-proluvial action. The depth of Aeolian (i.e., wind-blown/created) coversand varies from 1.5 metres in the centre and east of the desert to 2.5 metres in the west. The maximum height of the sandy deposits altogether (including aeolian cover-sand) is 27.4 metres. The deposits are predominantly fine and medium sand, though gravel and boulders are also observed. The age of the dunes and aeolian coversands was estimated in 1999 as being 480 years +/- 50 years, which matches the development of zinc and lead mining in the area.
