= Rabsztyn Castle =

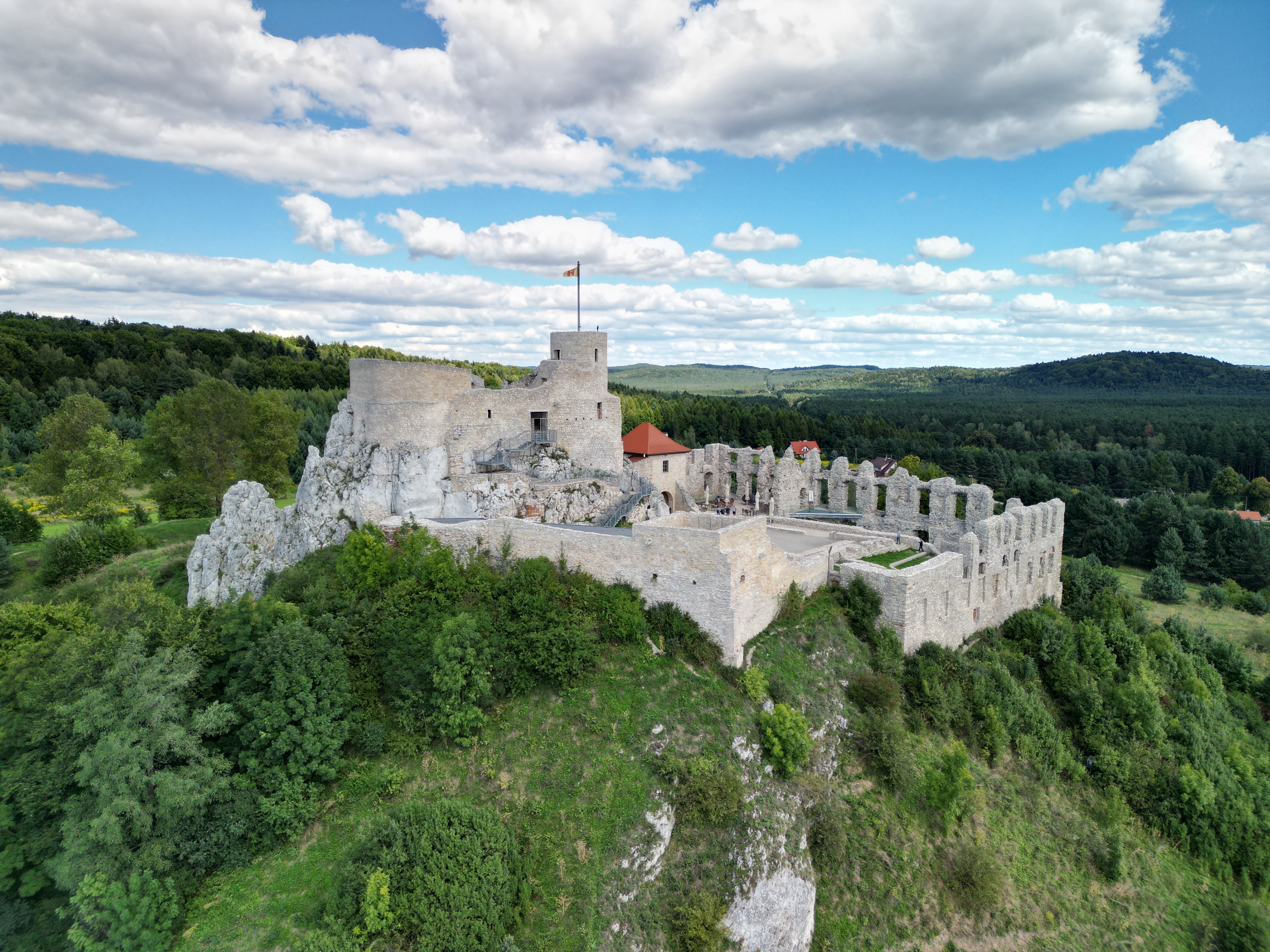
- Rabsztyn Castle

- Location of the Rabsztyn Castle in Poland
- 50°18′03″N 19°35′39″E
- Location: Rabsztyn, Lesser Poland Voivodeship, Poland

History
- Built: 13th-century

Site notes
- Architectural style: Gothic

Rabsztyn Castle is a preserved Gothic ruined castle located in the Polish Jura within the Eagles' Nests Trail, in the village of Rabsztyn, Lesser Poland Voivodeship in southern Poland.

The etymology of Rabsztyn Castle derives from the German Rabenstein, translating to Raven's Rock.

Having undergone extensive reconstruction, since May 2015, the castle has been opened to tourists.

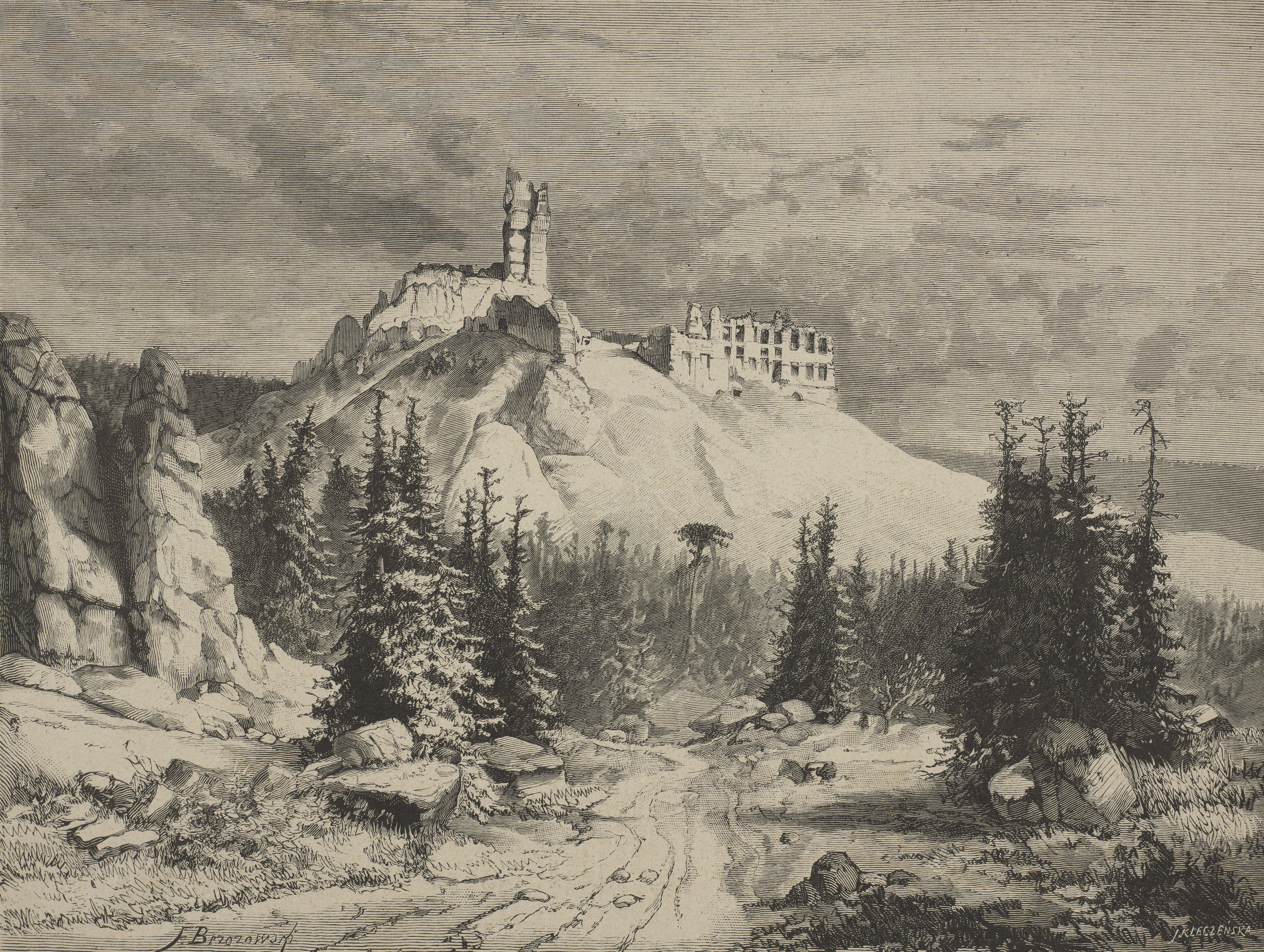
Castle ruins, before 1932 1879

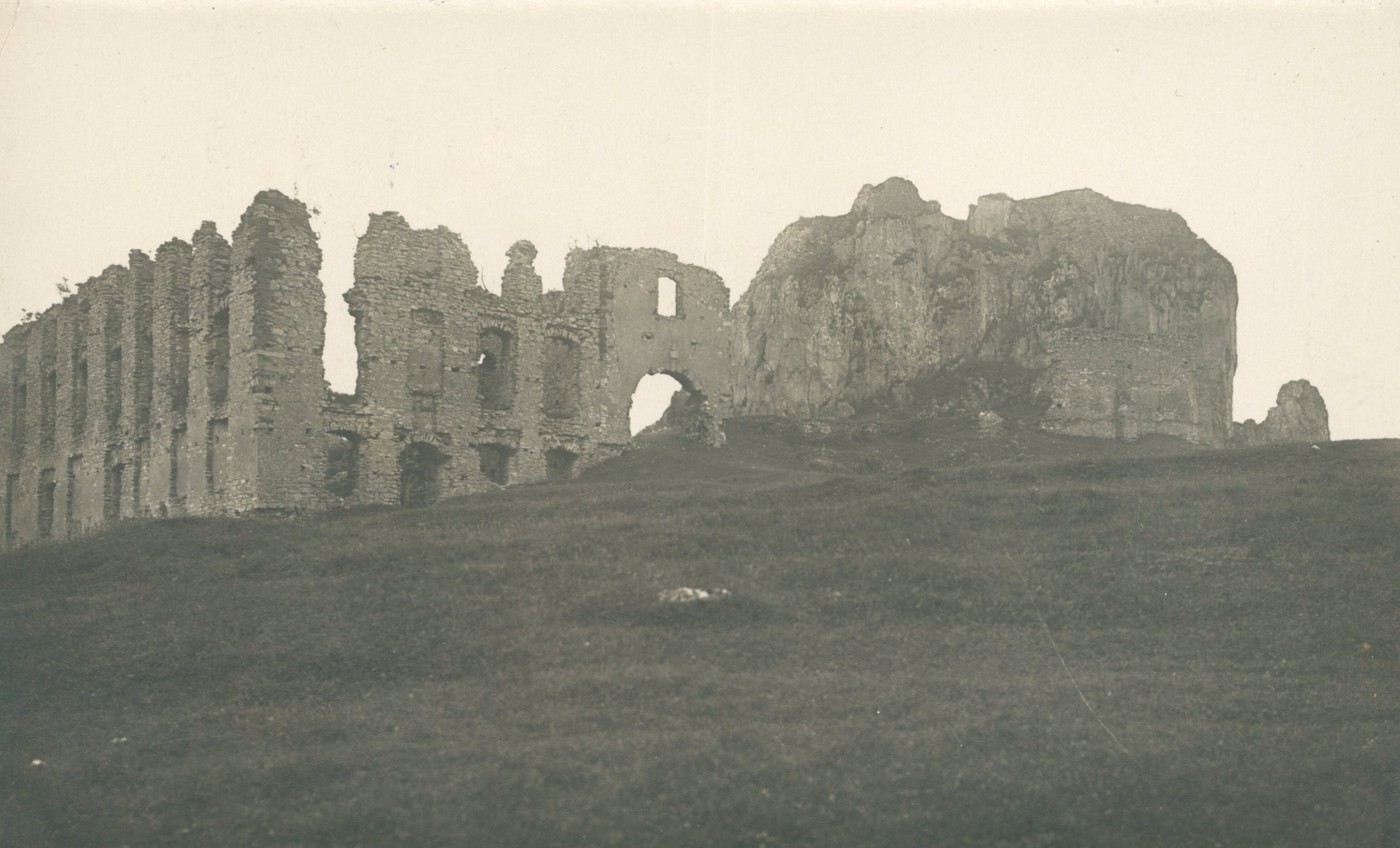
Castle ruins, before 1932

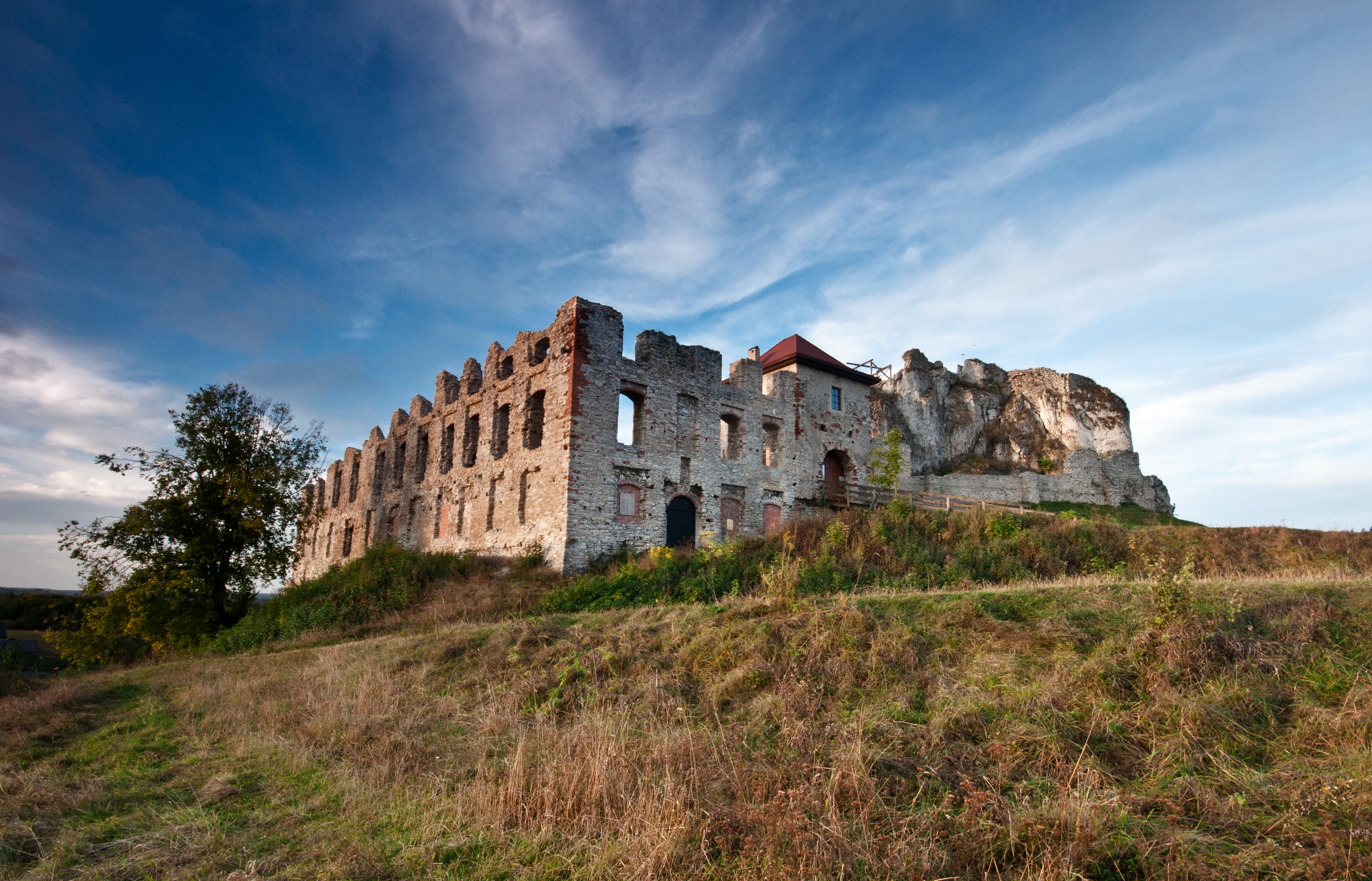
Rabsztyn Castle during reconstruction

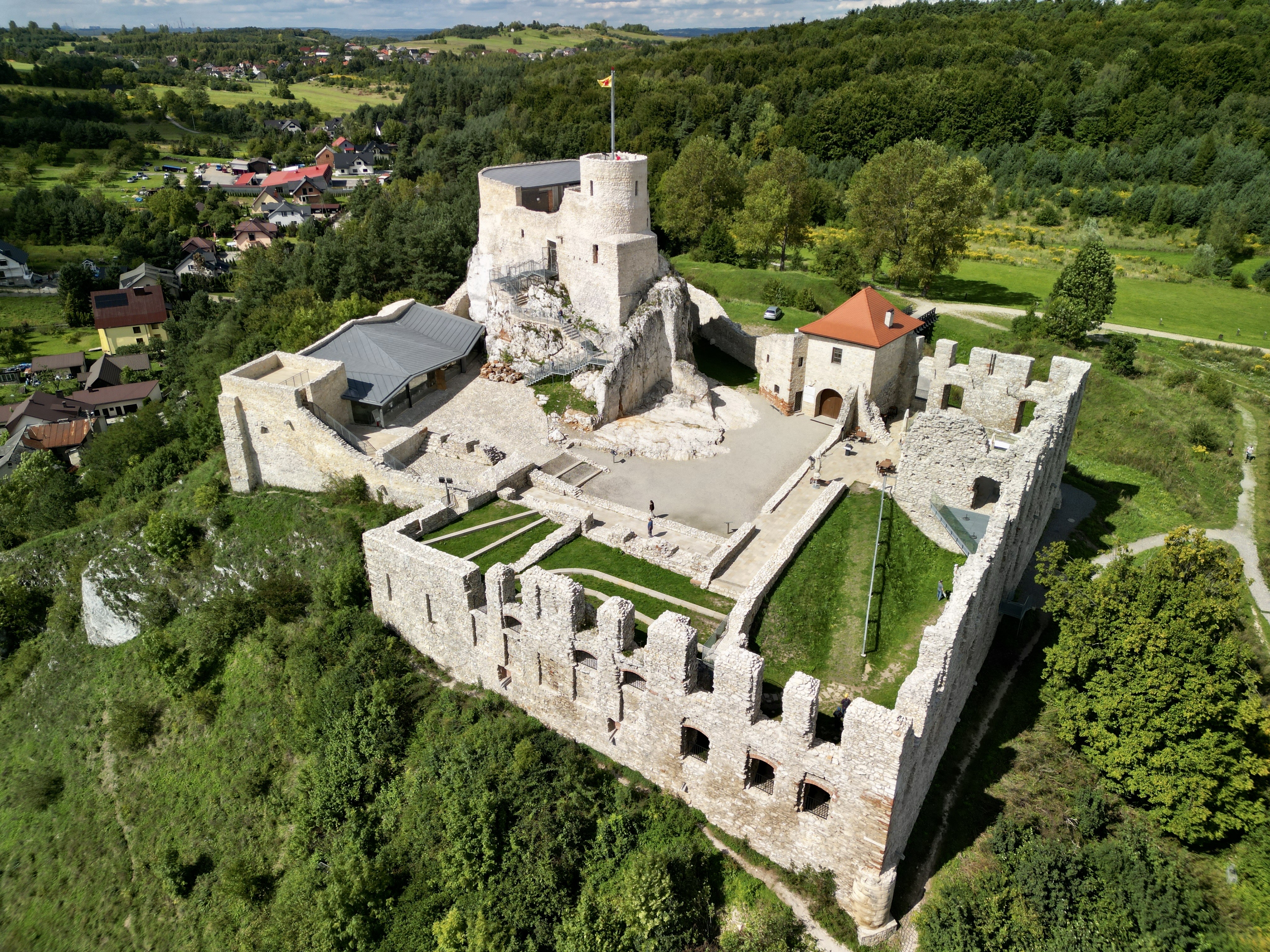
Rabsztyn Castle after reconstruction

== See also ==
- Castles in Poland
