= Wiśliczka =

- Village
- Location within Poland
- Coordinates: 50°16′30″N 19°37′37″E
- Country: Poland
- Voivodeship: Lesser Poland
- County: Olkusz
- Gmina: Olkusz

Wiśliczka [viˈɕlit͡ʂka] is a village in the administrative district of Gmina Olkusz, within Olkusz County, Lesser Poland Voivodeship, in southern Poland.
