= Bloody Wednesday of Olkusz =

Perpetration of civilians in Poland

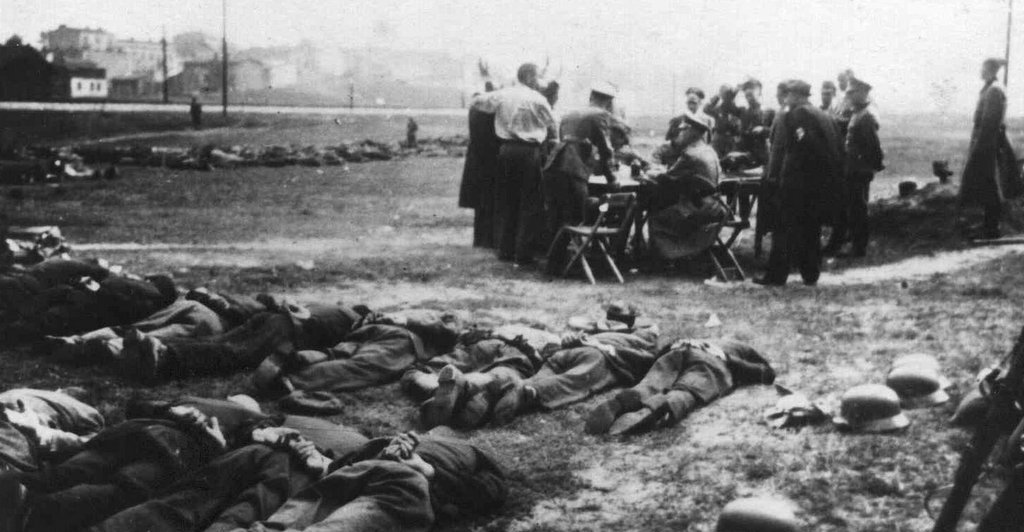
The Bloody Wednesday in Olkusz, German-occupied Poland, 31 July 1940. Polish and Jewish hostages at the forefront, lying face down on the ground. In the background photo shows the table where German police officers are verifying the identity documents. The hostages were forced to remain prone on the ground for several hours, and many were subject to beatings and other abuse.

The Bloody Wednesday of Olkusz or Bloody Wednesday in Olkusz (Polish: Krwawa środa w Olkuszu) was a violent reprisal against Polish civilians perpetrated by the German occupiers in Olkusz on July 31, 1940, during World War II. Three victims were killed.

The incident began with the retaliation for the death of a German policeman killed by a burglar on July 14. Two days later, in a reprisal act of collective punishment, 20 civilian hostages, ethnic Poles from Olkusz and its surrounding region, were shot in the Olkusz neighborhood of Parcze. Two weeks later, on a day that became known as the "Bloody Wednesday of Olkusz", a second German punitive expedition chased all the men from Olkusz, both ethnic Poles as well as Polish Jews, to the market square and city squares, where they were brutally tortured and harassed for several hours, with many wounded and three fatalities. One of those three was identified as a Polish-American Jew, the other two being a Polish electrician and a local priest.

Until the early 21st century, a number of high-profile works published outside Poland summarizing this incident incorrectly identified the victims as only "Polish Jews" or just "Jews", despite the fact that the majority of the fatalities were gentile Poles.

== Background ==
The town of Olkusz was occupied by German forces during their invasion of Poland, on September 5, 1939, and shortly afterward annexed to the German Province of Silesia. Approximately a fourth of the town's population, or about 2,500 people, were Polish-Jews, the rest were ethnic Polish gentiles.

In early March 1940, Polish doctor Julian Łapiński was arrested by Germans and sent to the Dachau concentration camp. His wife and daughter still lived in Olkusz in their villa in the Parcze neighborhood, and in early July their house was subjected to a failed burglary attempt. A few days later, on July 14, German policeman Ernst Kaddatz was billeted in their house, taking over the lower floor. Shortly after, during the night of July 15 to 16, another burglary attempt in the villa resulted in the death of Kaddatz. The perpetrator was never caught and it is suspected that on the same night he burglarized another house nearby.

== Massacre of July 16 ==
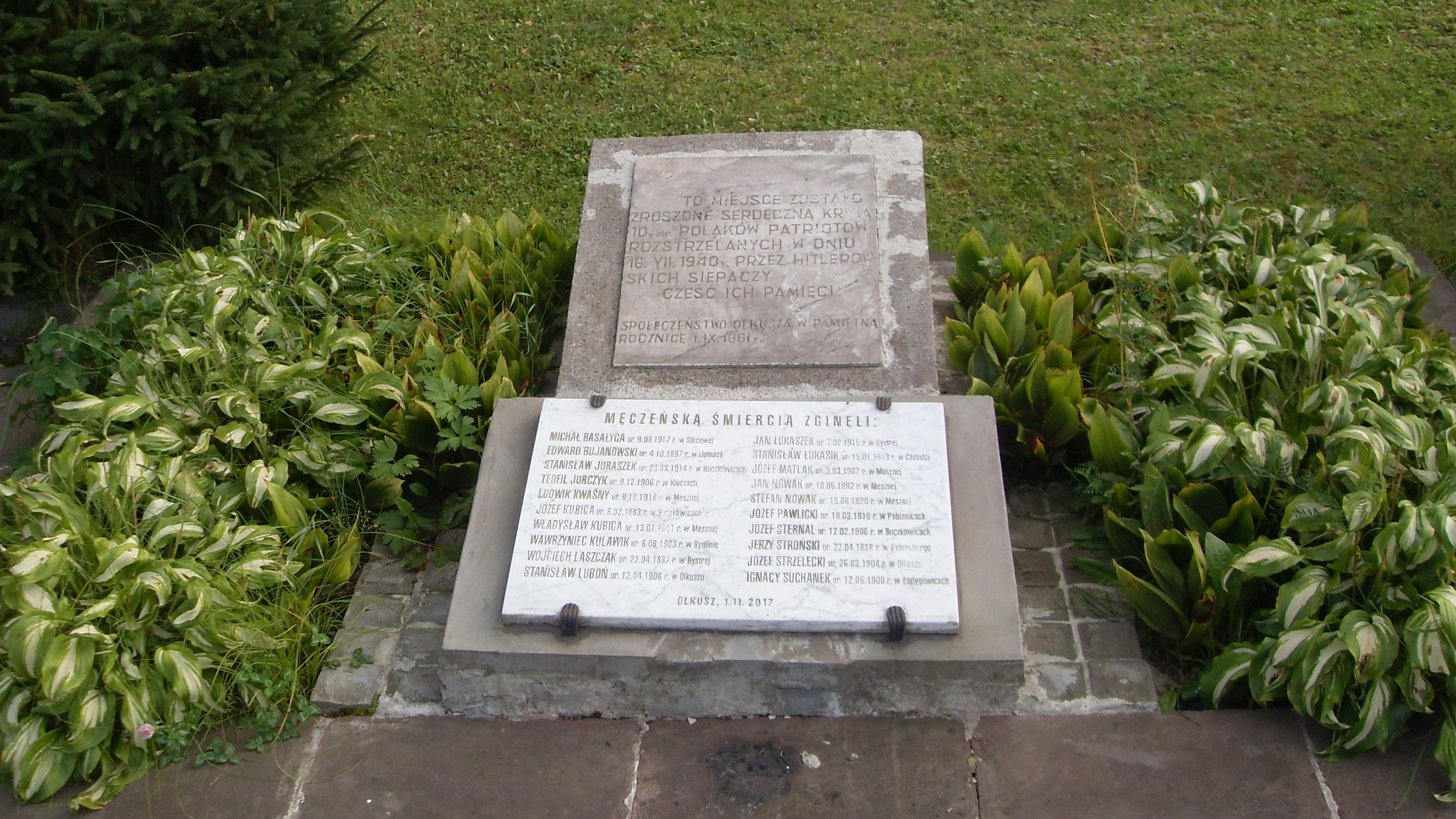
Memorial plaque with the names of the 20 Poles executed on July 16

Despite the local German authorities concluding that the incident was criminal and not political, higher German authorities decided to carry out a collective punishment reprisal action to intimidate the Polish inhabitants. The German terror against the local population was aimed at the planned Germanisation of the town and the region. An expeditionary force of Schutzstaffel arrived in the town early on July 16. All German inhabitants were ordered to gather in the town square. Shortly afterward Germans burned down Łapiński's villa (initially they considered burning down all the houses on the same street, but were convinced to reduce the collateral damage by the arguments of a local interpreter). Shortly after, Germans arrested a number of Polish citizens of the city (Teofil Jurczyk, Wawrzyniec Kulawik, Stanisław Luboń, Jerzy Stroński and Józef Strzelecki). They were gathered together with fifteen Polish prisoners transported from nearby prisons in Mysłowice and Sosnowiec, and around 8:00 p.m. all twenty were executed by a firing squad near the Łapiński's villa. Their burial place remains unknown. The names, and most occupations and family histories of the victims, have been identified; none of the victims have been described as of Jewish ethnicity.

== Bloody Wednesday ==
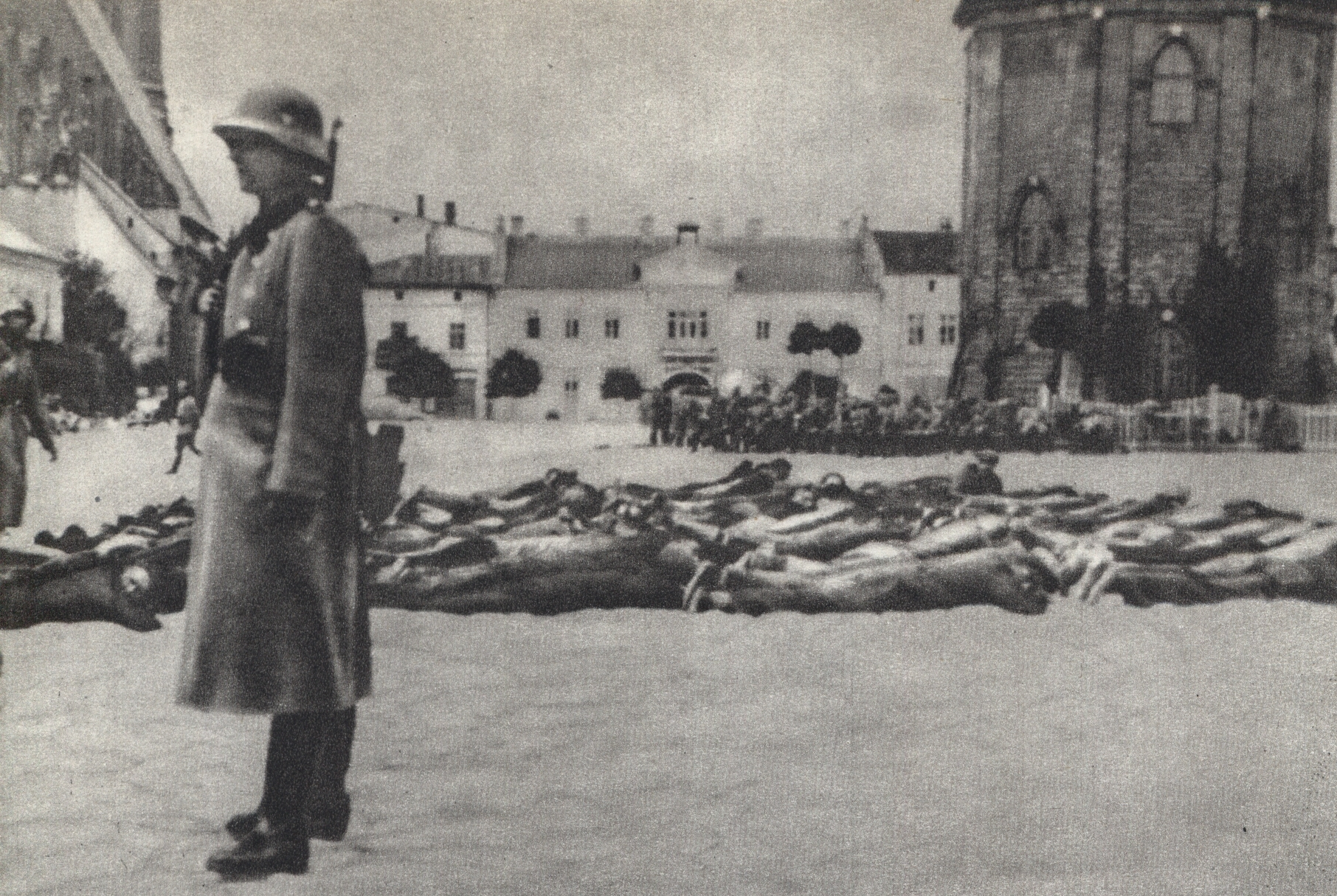
The Bloody Wednesday Olkusz 1940. German soldier guarding prone men of Olkusz on July 31. The picture has been described as "known to everyone in Olkusz".

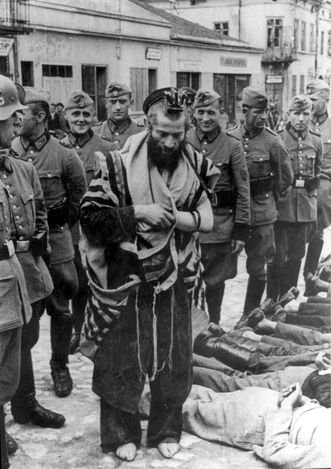
Rabbi Moshe Hagerman the Dayan – Jewish municipal chief judge, dressed in his Talit and Teffilin and being abused by German soldiers, who are forcing him to pray, for their amusement. This image was later identified by people who survived the war and the incident, as an image from the "Bloody Wednesday of Olkusz", taken on July 31, 1940. The photograph has been described as one of the best known photographs of the Holocaust.

After two weeks of relative quiet, a second German punitive expedition arrived in Olkusz shortly after midnight on July 31. It included Gestapo personnel, as well as members of German gendarmery and police, and possibly – accounts vary – regular Wehrmacht soldiers. From around 2:00 a.m German forces started to gather all the local men at least 15 years old who were either ethnic Poles or Polish Jews. Prisoners were told to lie down flat, face down, on the ground for many hours, until about 3:00 p.m., while the Germans verified their documents, and in the meantime were subject to abuse and beatings. Some victims were ordered to take part in a makeshift parade and bathe in the local muddy river and its banks. Jewish inhabitants were often singled out for extreme abuse, stripped naked, stomped upon, forced to recite Christian prayers, and even to stone one another. One witness reported an incident in which a German soldier crushed the face of a Jew on whom he stomped. A photograph of Rabbi Moshe Hagerman the Dayan, one of several taken by German soldiers, would become one of the most famous images from that day, and also described as one of the iconic images of the Holocaust in Poland. Rabbi Hagerman, forced by Germans to pray, for their amusement, and abused on that day, survived until 1942, when he was murdered in Majdanek concentration camp. Rabbi Hagerman's photograph became best known outside Poland, while in Poland the better known picture, described as "known to everyone in Olkusz", shows a lone German sentry guarding a group of prone men lying down in the Olkusz town square.

Dozens of people were reported to be so hurt that they could not return home unaided, and many had to recuperate for weeks. The exact number of fatalities of the Bloody Wednesday is not known, but identities of three individuals who died during or shortly after the incident from wounds suffered have been confirmed. The first victim was a Polish electrician, Tadeusz Lupa, who was shot. Two other victims died over the coming days from the wounds suffered from having been severely beaten by the German soldiers; one, a Polish-American Jew, Isaac Miller (or Majer), who was abused despite having declared himself an American citizen; the third victim was the local parish priest, Piotr Mączka, who also succumbed to his wounds and died on August 10.

== Remembrance ==
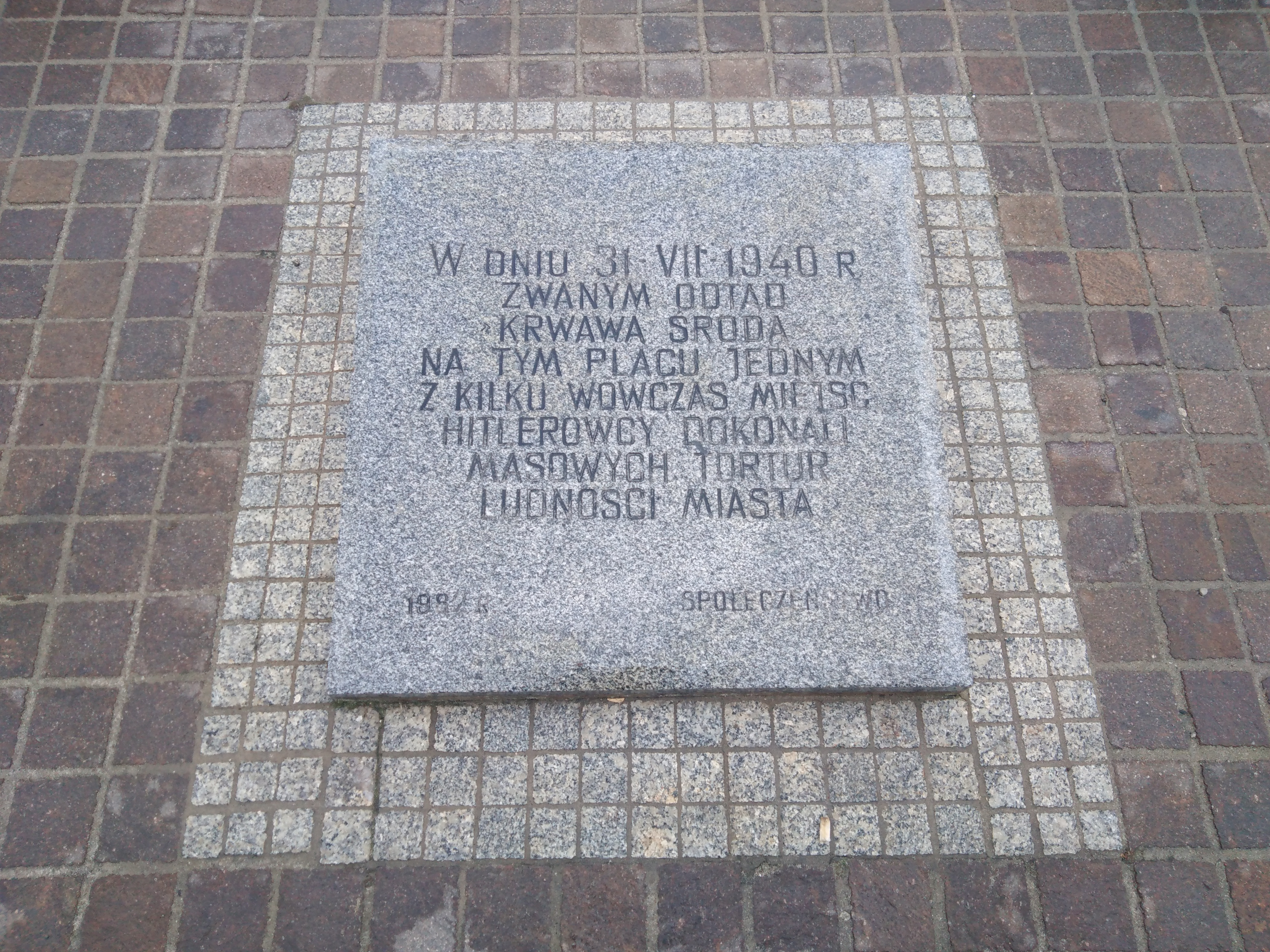
Bloody Wednesday commemorative plaque at Market Square in Olkusz

Germans took a number of photographs of the events, which they had developed by a Polish photographer who made clandestine copies of several. Those have survived the war and have been collected in Polish archives and museums.

Days after Olkusz was abandoned by the retreating Germans in January 1945, local inhabitants raised a number of crosses and a metal plaque in remembrance of the victims of 1940 events. The street in which Łapiński's villa was located was renamed that year to the "20 Executed" (20 Straconych). Stone plaques in memory of the events of July 16 were dedicated in the town in 1961. In 1982, at the Olkusz Main Square, a new plaque, and a separate obelisk, were unveiled, this time in remembrance of the events of the Bloody Wednesday. Since the war ended, the local administration has been holding remembrance ceremonies each year on July 31.

The event is described as one of the most tragic episodes in the wartime history of Olkusz, second only to the liquidation of the Olkusz Ghetto in June 1942, which resulted in the destruction of nearly the entire local Jewish populace, representing nearly a third of the town's population. Some Polish publicists have noted that in the local historiography and commemorations, the memory of the events of July 1940 is unduly stressed compared to the even more tragic events surrounding the destruction of the local Jewry in 1942.

== Misrepresentation in international historiography ==
For many years, a number of non-Polish publications erroneously described the Bloody Wednesday of Olkusz as a Holocaust event whose only victims were Polish Jews, which is incorrect as the victims on July 16 were the gentile citizens of Olkusz, and during the events of the Bloody Wednesday, the abused included all male citizens of Olkusz, ethnic Poles and Polish Jews alike. Incorrect descriptions of the event, with the victims described as "Polish Jews" or just "Jews", were perpetuated by sources such as the Encyclopedia of Camps and Ghettos of the United States Holocaust Memorial Museum, publications of the Yad Vashem, Simon Wiesenthal Center and Ghetto Fighters' House, and in a permanent exhibition at the House of the Wannsee Conference. Other errors in those sources include referring to the victims of July 16 as just Jews, describing Taduesz Lupa as a Jew and conflating the events of July 16 with those of the July 31 by reporting that the execution of the 20 hostages took place during the Bloody Wednesday.

Efforts by Polish historians such as Adam Cyra of Auschwitz-Birkenau State Museum and Feliks Tych of the Jewish Historical Institute have led to the correction of the inaccurate descriptions of the events in Olkusz in a number of works in the early 21st century. In 2006 Tych and the mayor of Olkusz, Dariusz Rzepka, requested corrections of Yad Vashem's web pages. This was reported as successful in the Polish media, which cited a reply to the Olkusz government and Tych by the director of the Yad Vashem Photography Archive, Daniel Uziel, who promised that the errors would be swiftly corrected. The error on the Yad Vashem pages was reported to have been corrected in 2007. Likewise, the error in the text of the exhibition at the House of the Wannsee Conference was corrected earlier that year. In 2016 Adam Cyra found an error in the Encyclopedia of Camps and Ghettos and requested a correction. However, as of 2021, the descriptions of the event characterizing all victims as only "Jews" still persisted, among others, in the online edition of the Encyclopedia of Camps and Ghettos (2012) and again on the Yad Vashem webpage. In August 2021 the Coalition of Polish Americans highlighted this error, described as "the appropriation of the massacre as a “Jewish” tragedy", as one of several "historical inaccuracies and ethnocentric lapses contained in the USHMM historiography" with regards to history of Poland during World War II, and noted that Adam Cyra explicitly contrasted USHMM and Yad Vashem treatments of this to the Wikipedia article on the "Bloody Wednesday of Olkusz", calling the latter the "correct account".
