= Johann Zacharias Frey =

Austrian artist

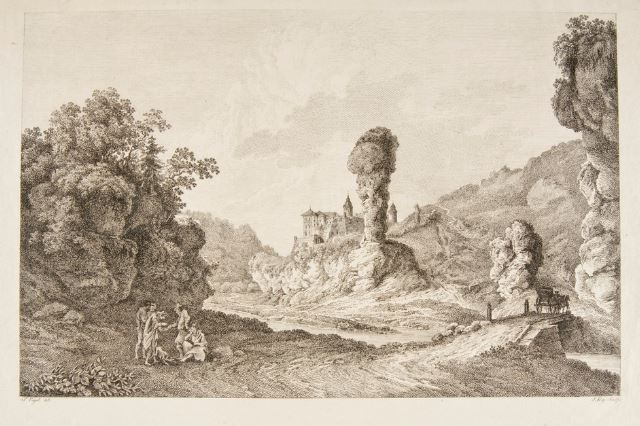
View of Pieskowa Skała (after a drawing by Zygmunt Vogel)

Johann Zacharias Frey, or Jan Zachariasz Frey (June 1769 – 8 August 1829) was an Austrian engraver and painter who spent most of his career in Poland.

== Biography ==
He was born in Vienna. His father was an Austrian military officer. Frey initially studied painting at the Academy of Fine Arts, Vienna, then studied in London with Benjamin West.

At the invitation of the Czartoryski family, he went to Puławy, around 1794, where he made a series of engravings of the residence and the Puławy Garden , established by Countess Izabela Czartoryska. In 1804, he was appointed court painter and engraver to Count Adam Jerzy Czartoryski. During that time, he produced a series of illustrative engravings for a book by the Countess called Various Thoughts on the Art of Garden Design, published by Wilhelm Gottlieb Korn. Most of the original engravings are now at the Czartoryski Museum.

Shortly after, he relocated to Warsaw, where he spent the rest of his life. In addition to his artistic activity, he was a teacher at the Piarist monastery school.

His first project there was a series of postcards, depicting national monuments, based on the drawings Zygmunt Vogel. In 1815, he illustrated On the Carpathian Region and Other Mountains of Poland by Stanisław Staszic. The following year, he illustrated Historical Songs, with lyrics by Julian Ursyn Niemcewicz, set to music by Karol Kurpiński.

From 1808, he was a member of the Masonic Lodge. He was interred at the Protestant Reformed Cemetery, Warsaw, but his tomb has not survived.

His son, Jakub Michał Frey, became a noted obstetrician.

== Sources ==
- Biography from the Biographisches Lexikon des Kaiserthums Oesterreich @ WikiSource
