= Podlesie, Olkusz County =

Podlesie
- Village
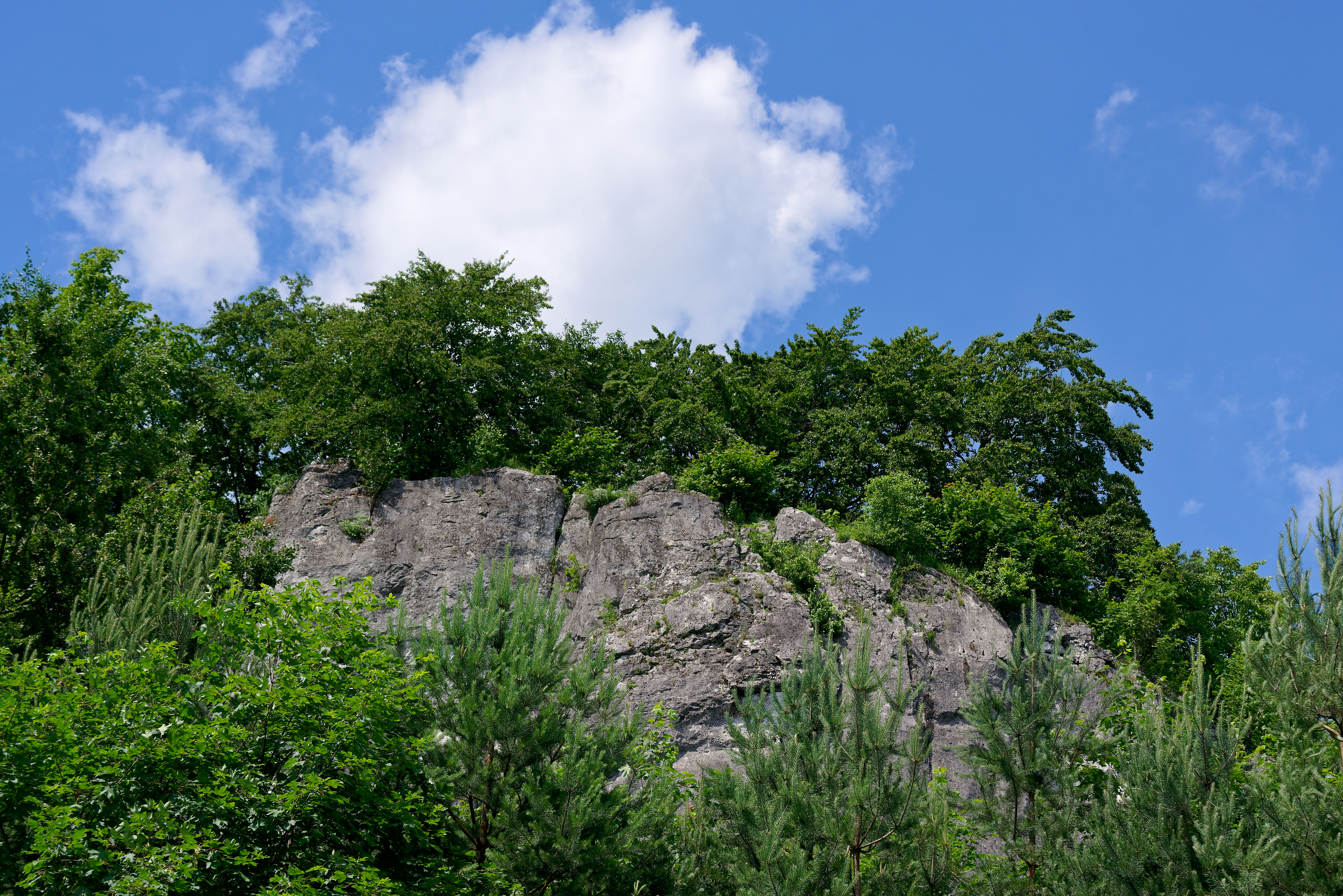

- Location within Poland
- Coordinates: 50°19′N 19°38′E
- Country: Poland
- Voivodeship: Lesser Poland
- County: Olkusz
- Gmina: Olkusz
- Population: 330

Podlesie [pɔdˈlɛɕɛ] is a village in the administrative district of Gmina Olkusz, within Olkusz County, Lesser Poland Voivodeship, in southern Poland.
