= Zawada, Olkusz County =

Zawada
- Village
- Location within Poland
- Coordinates: 50°13′20″N 19°38′31″E
- Country: Poland
- Voivodeship: Lesser Poland
- County: Olkusz
- Gmina: Olkusz
- Population: 630

Zawada [zaˈvada] is a village in the administrative district of Gmina Olkusz, within Olkusz County, Lesser Poland Voivodeship, in southern Poland.
