= Niesułowice, Lesser Poland Voivodeship =

Niesułowice
- Village
- Location within Poland
- Coordinates: 50°12′6″N 19°33′6″E
- Country: Poland
- Voivodeship: Lesser Poland
- County: Olkusz
- Gmina: Olkusz
- Elevation: 430 m (1,410 ft)

Niesułowice [ɲɛsuwɔˈvit͡sɛ] is a village in the administrative district of Gmina Olkusz, within Olkusz County, Lesser Poland Voivodeship, in southern Poland.

== Religions ==
- Roman Catholicism,
- Jehovah's Witnesses (10%).
