= Rabsztyn, Lesser Poland Voivodeship =

Rabsztyn
- Village
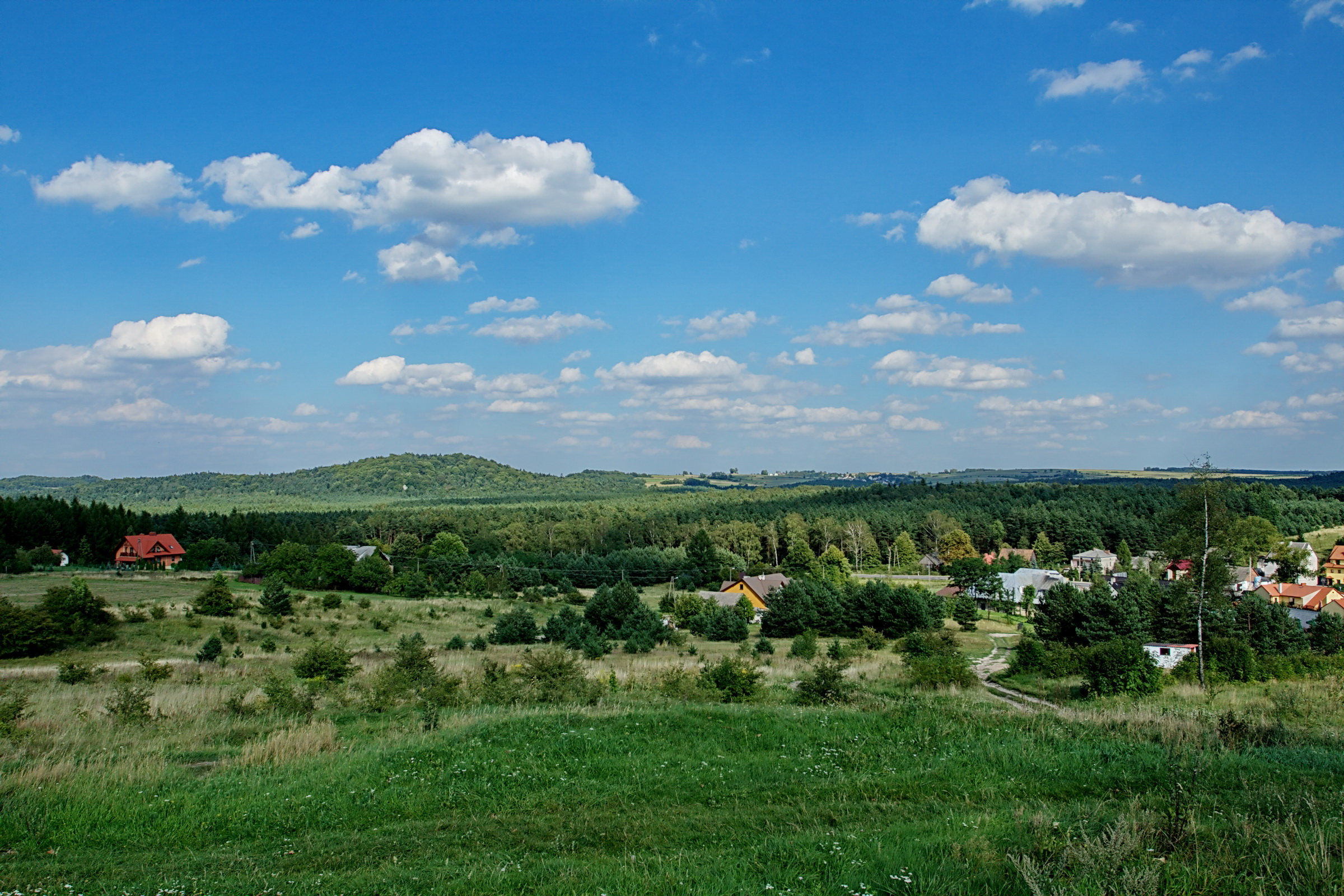

- Location within Poland
- Coordinates: 50°18′N 19°37′E
- Country: Poland
- Voivodeship: Lesser Poland
- County: Olkusz
- Gmina: Olkusz
- Time zone: UTC+1 (CET)
  - Summer (DST): UTC+2 (CEST)
- Vehicle registration: KOL

Rabsztyn [ˈrapʂtɨn] is a village in the administrative district of Gmina Olkusz, within Olkusz County, Lesser Poland Voivodeship, in southern Poland.

It is home to Rabsztyn Castle.
