= Olkusz =

Town in Lesser Poland Voivodeship, Poland

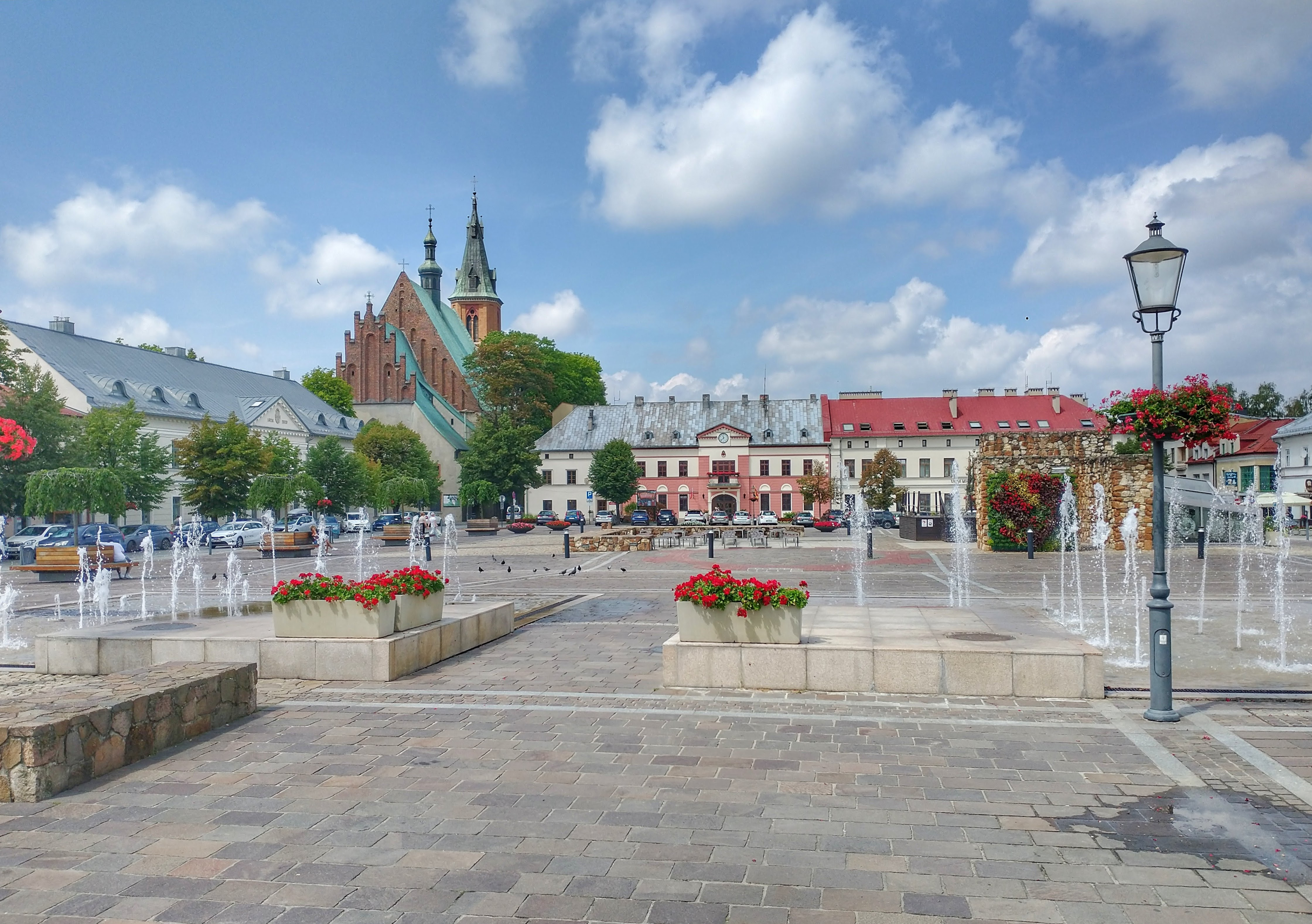
- Rynek (Market Square) with the Saint Andrew Basilica and town hall

- Flag Coat of arms

- Location within Poland
- Coordinates: 50°17′N 19°34′E
- Country: Poland
- Voivodeship: Lesser Poland
- County: Olkusz
- Gmina: Olkusz
- Town rights: before 1299

Government
  - Mayor: Roman Piaśnik

Area
  - Total: 25.65 km^{2} (9.90 sq mi)

Population (30.06.2025)
  - Total: 31,668
  - Density: 1,235/km^{2} (3,198/sq mi)
- Time zone: UTC+1 (CET)
  - Summer (DST): UTC+2 (CEST)
- Postal code: 32-300 - 32-305
- Car plates: KOL
- Website: http://www.olkusz.eu

Olkusz [ˈɔlkuʂ] (Yiddish: עלקיש Elkish) is a town in southern Poland with 36,607 inhabitants (2014). It is the capital of Olkusz County in the Lesser Poland Voivodeship.

Founded in the Middle Ages, Olkusz is a former royal town of Poland, and features a medieval urban layout with defensive walls, a preserved market square, and a Gothic basilica. It is known for its abundance of silver, which is mined and extracted in the vicinity, and once housed a Polish royal mint. Olkusz is home to the Museum of African Studies.

== Surroundings ==
The city is on the Baba River, a tributary of the Sztoła, with a major road reaching it from Warsaw and Kraków, making it the central city of the vicinity. Tourists who wish to visit nature and historical sites, start from here. Also, Olkusz is located on the main railroad line, which connects Upper Silesia and Zaglebie with Kielce. The Starczynów Desert is located nearby, and wind-blown sands from the desert troubled the town until the desert was planted with trees in 1949 resulting in the desert becoming overgrown.

== History ==
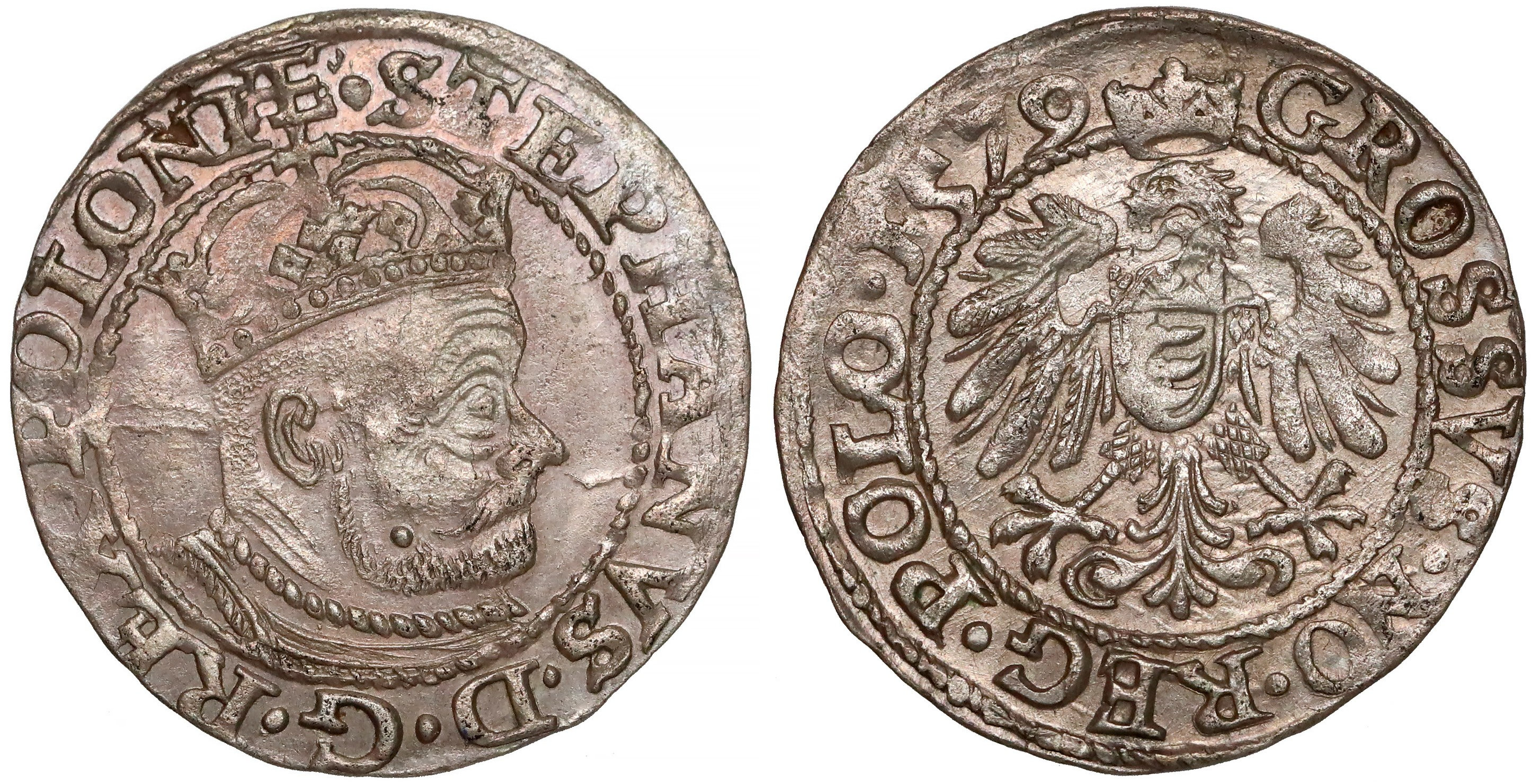
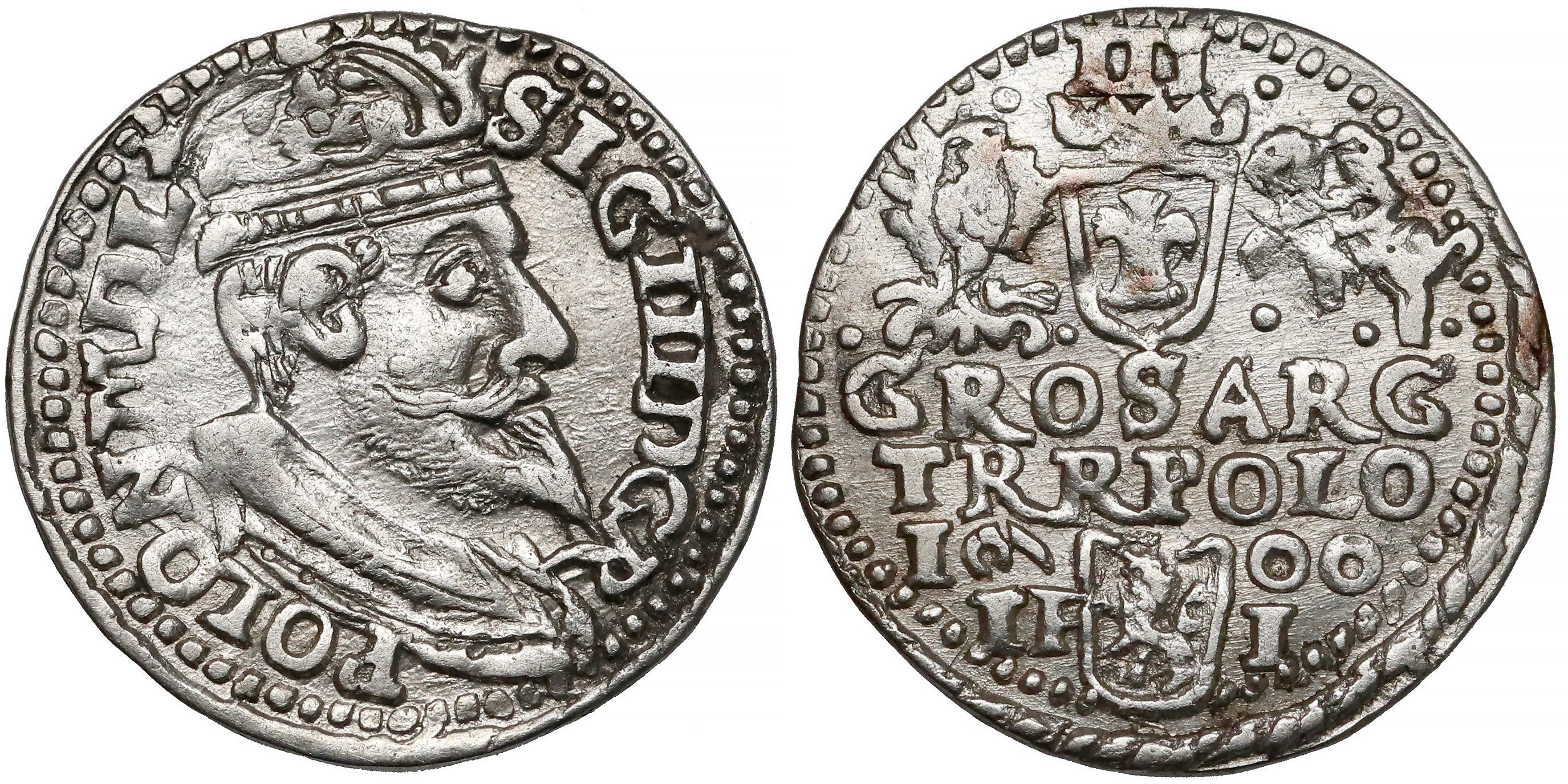
16th-century Polish coins from the local mint

On the city's website, a myth is cited that the city was founded by ancient Phoenicians (Canaanites) who traveled here and found lead ore. The origin of the name Olkusz is cited as the ancient Phoenician (Canaanite Hebrew) "Elkhuds" meaning "to chisel". However, the Hebrew word for "to chisel" was "lakhrot" and the likelihood of the ancient Phoenicians having reached Poland is very low.

A first written historical document from the year 1299 refers to the city of Olkusz, although it was granted town rights earlier. It was located within the Seniorate Province of the fragmented Kingdom of Poland, and then it was a royal town of Poland, administratively located in the Kraków Voivodeship in the Lesser Poland Province. The inhabitants were mostly wealthy, due to the lead mines. Silver was discovered too. In 1579, King Stephen Báthory founded a Royal mint in Olkusz. Various wars crossed the path of this town, which was at its lowest at the end of the 17th century (see: The Deluge).

In the Third Partition of Poland (1795) the town was annexed by Austria. Following the Austro-Polish War of 1809 it was regained by Poles and included within the short-lived Duchy of Warsaw, and after the duchy's dissolution in 1815, the town fell to the Russian Partition of Poland. Fights of the Polish January Uprising took place in the area in 1863. Francesco Nullo, hero of the fights for Italian and Polish independence died in the Battle of Krzykawka nearby, and then was buried at the cemetery in Olkusz.

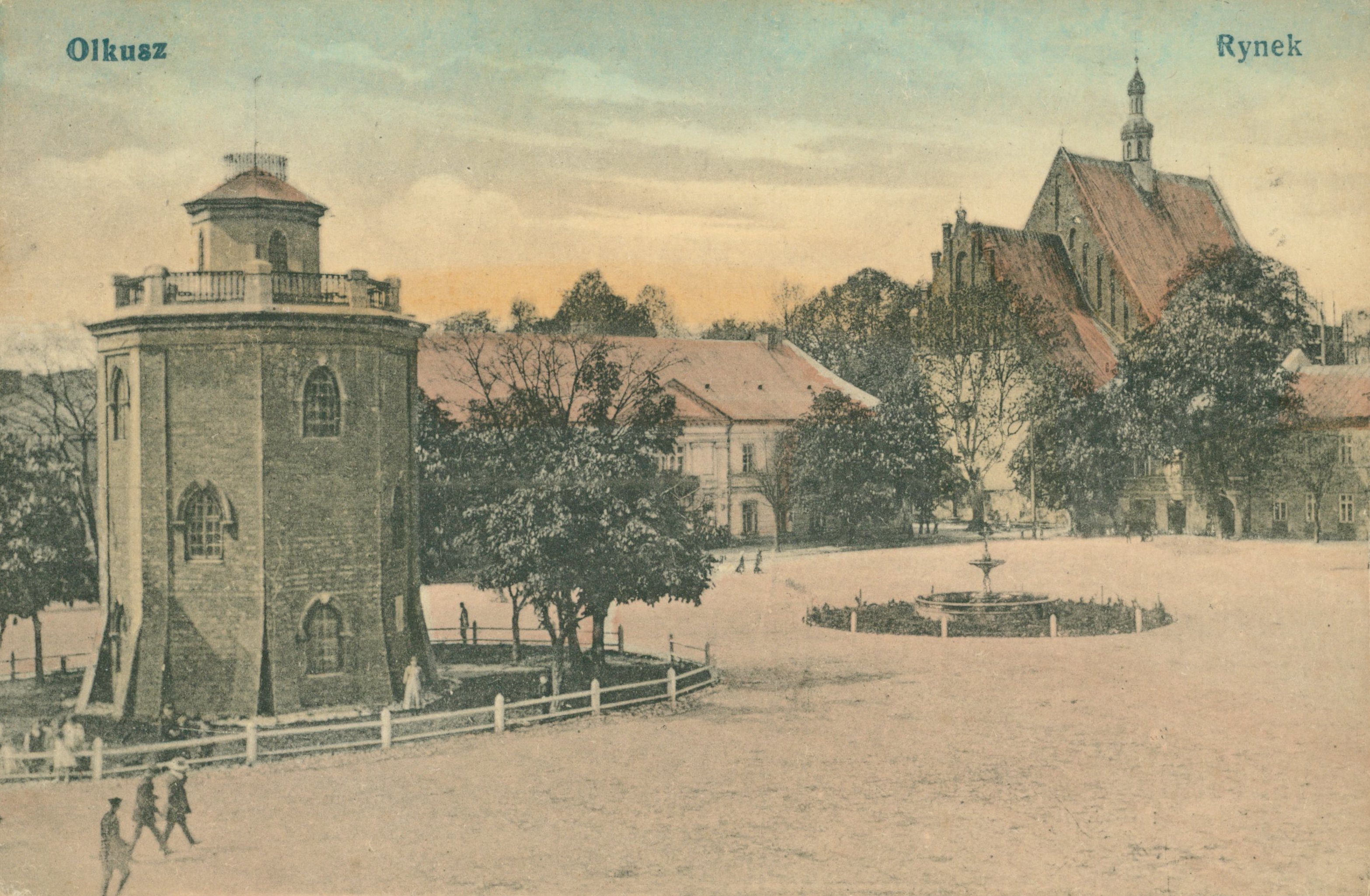
Early 20th-century view of the Rynek (Market Square)

Poland eventually regained independence and control of the town after World War I in 1918.

=== World War II ===
During the joint German-Soviet invasion of Poland, which started World War II in September 1939, the town was invaded by Germany. Already during the invasion, the Germans committed the first executions of local Poles (see also Nazi crimes against the Polish nation). Under German occupation, the town was annexed directly into Germany.

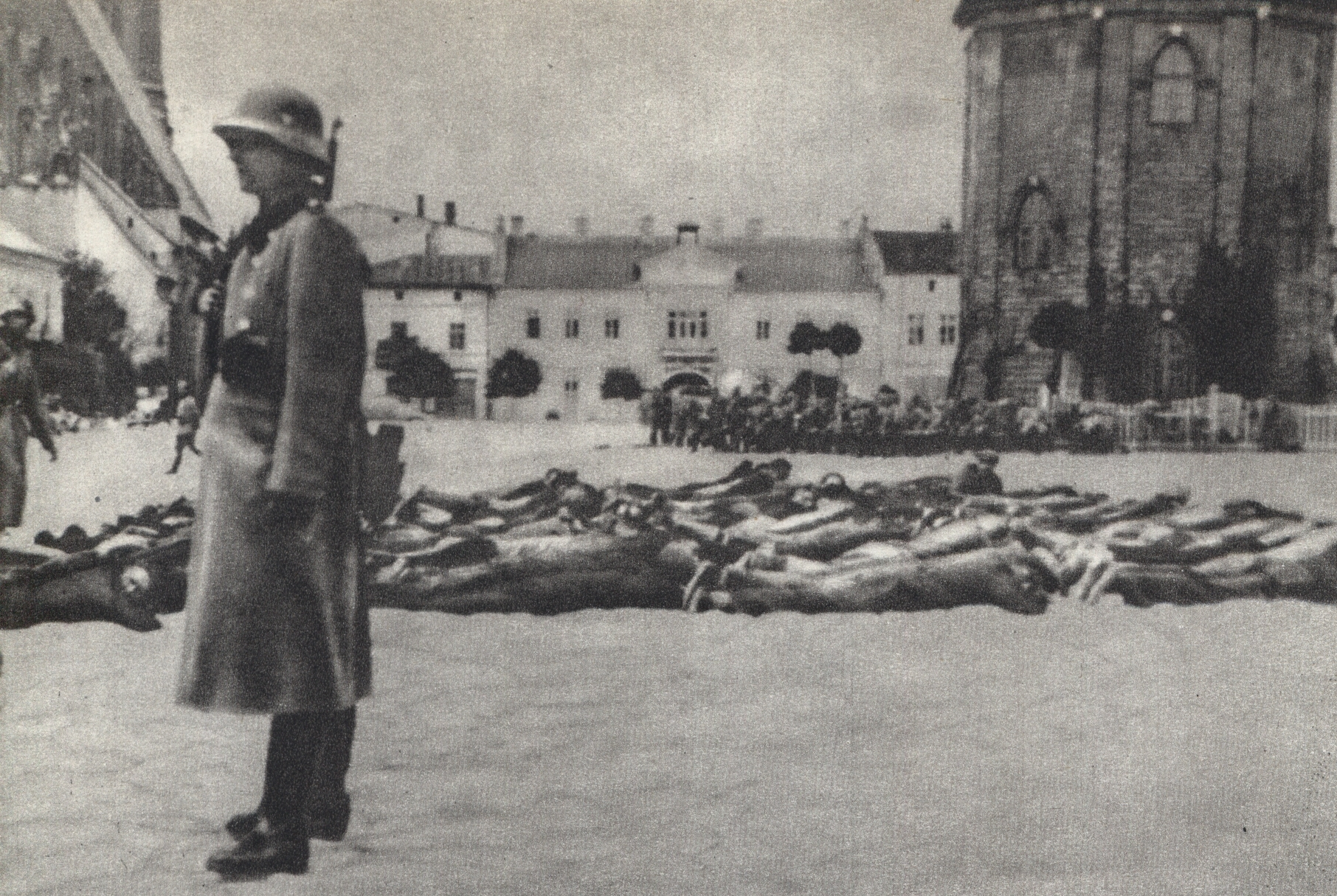
The Bloody Wednesday Olkusz 1940. German soldier guarding prone men of Olkusz on 31 July. The picture has been described as "known to everyone in Olkusz".

At least 15 Poles who were either born or lived and worked in Olkusz, including the local police chief, and several policemen and school teachers, were murdered by the Russians in the Katyn massacre in 1940. Poles from Olkusz were also among the victims of a massacre committed by the Germans in Celiny in June 1940. On 16 July 1940, in retaliation for the killing of a German policeman, the Germans carried out a massacre of 20 Polish hostages. On 31 July 1940, the Germans gathered all Polish and Jewish men aged 15 to 55 and subjected them to torture and murder. The German terror campaign against the local population was aimed at the planned Germanisation of the town and the region.

The Polish resistance was active in the town and its environs, including the Olkusz district of the Home Army, under the cryptonym "Oset". The district commander was captured by the occupiers in June 1942.

The occupation ended in January 1945, and the town was restored to Poland.

=== Recent history ===
In 1971, the Museum of African Studies was founded. In 1973, town limits were expanded by including the neighbouring settlements of Dodatki Pomorskie, Kamyk, Kocotówka, Piaski, Skalskie, Stary Olkusz and Stoczki, and parts of the neighbouring villages of Olewin and Sieniczno. From 1975 to 1998, it was administratively located in the Katowice Voivodeship.

== Sports ==
The town's most notable sports club is KS Olkusz with football and athletics sections.

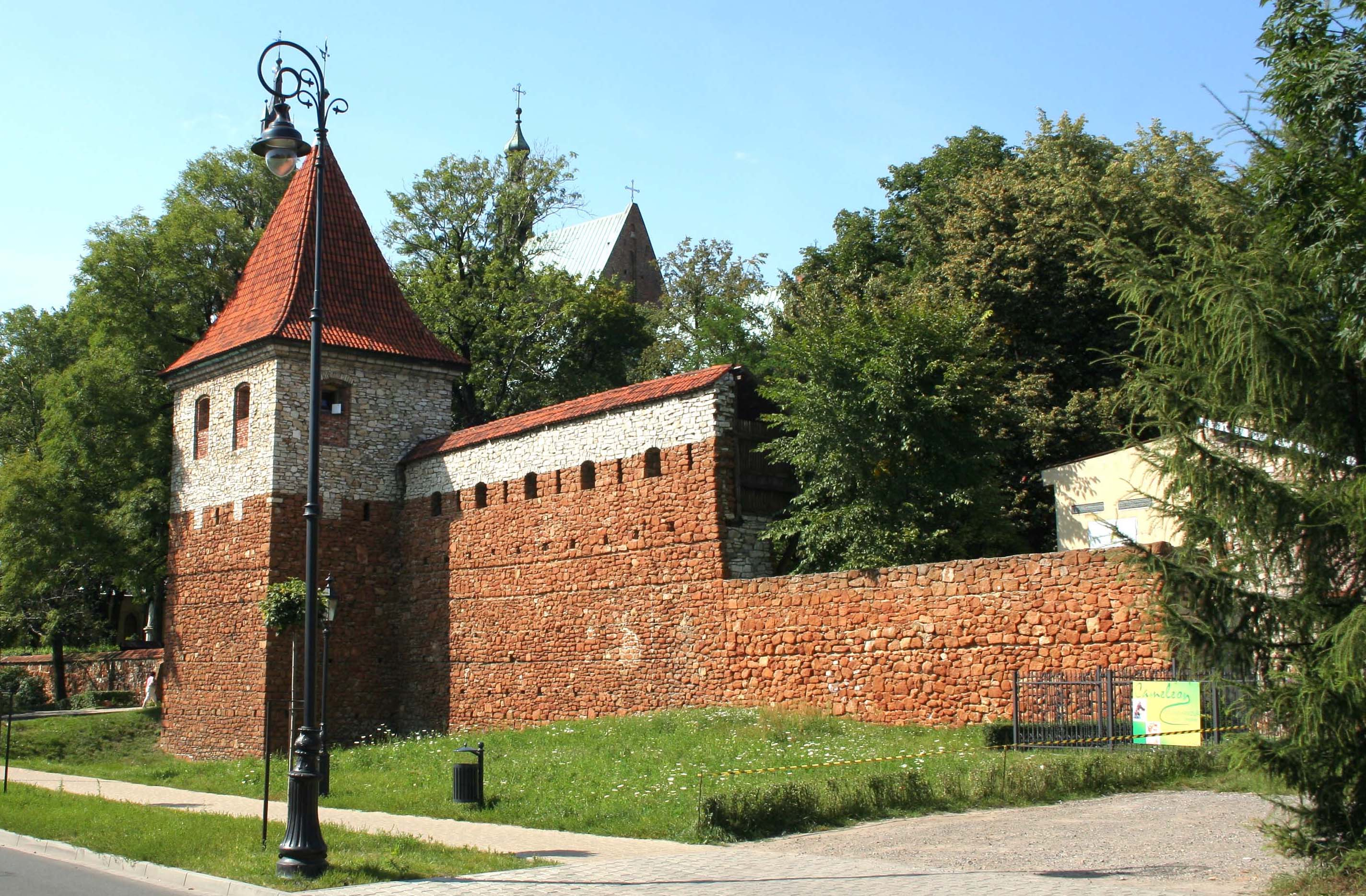
Defensive walls

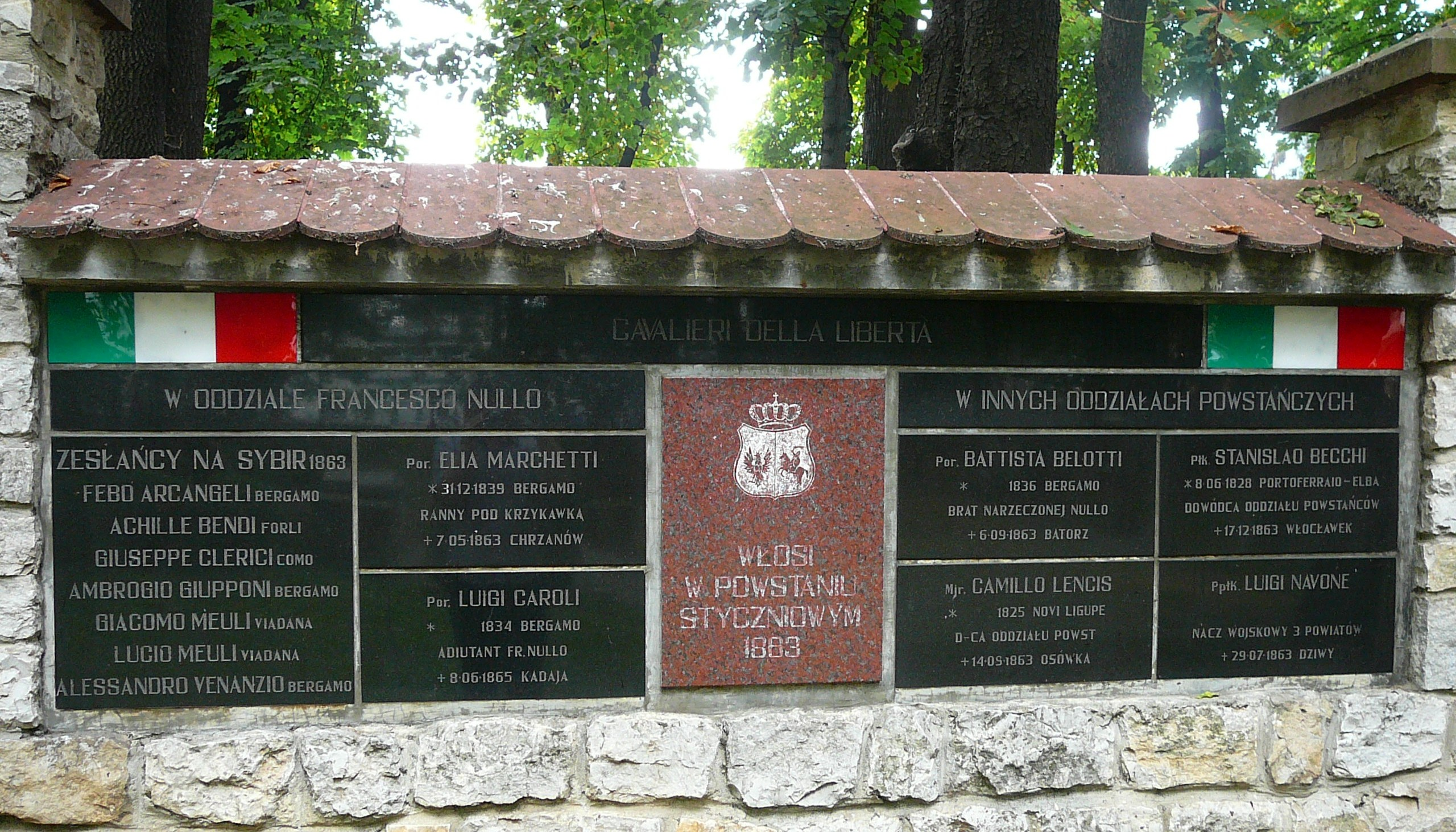
Memorial to Italian volunteers who fought for Polish independence in the January Uprising of 1863

== Religions ==
- Roman Catholicism 4 parishes:
  - St Andrew's Basilica
  - St Maximilian Maria Kolbe Church
  - St Barbara's Church
  - Good Shepherd Church
- Jehovah's Witnesses
- Pentecostalism
- Seventh-day Adventist Church
- Jewish (40% of the population before the Holocaust)

== International relations ==
=== Twin towns – Sister cities ===
- Bergamo, Italy
- Schwalbach am Taunus, Germany
- Staffordshire Moorlands, United Kingdom

== Notable people ==
- Paweł Blehm, Polish chess grandmaster
- Marcin Bylica a.k.a. Martin Bylica and Marcin z Olkusza, Polish astrologer and astronomer
- Paweł Czarnota, Polish chess Grandmaster
- Antoni Kocjan, Polish war hero and famous glider engineer
- Henryk Mandelbaum, noted Polish survivor of the Holocaust
- Tadeusz Rydzyk, Roman Catholic priest and Redemptorist
- Rabbi Dov Berish Einhorn
