= Italy–Poland relations =

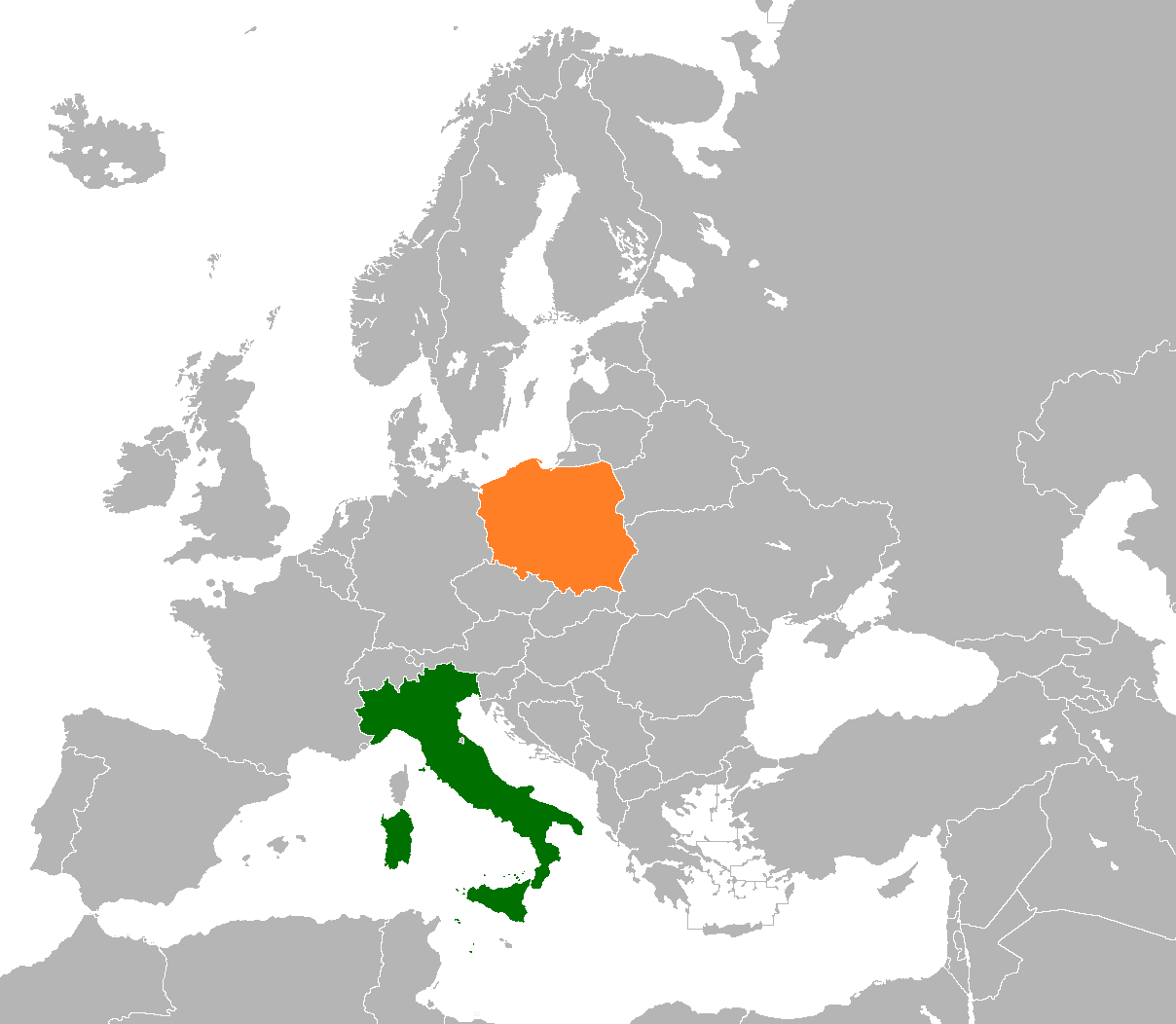
- Italy: Poland

Italy and Poland maintain cultural and political relations. The strong historical ties between both countries are based on common religion such as Roman Catholic and common fights for independence.

Relations go back to the Middle Ages and have grown closer since the Renaissance due to the frequent migrations in both directions and substantial cultural exchange, especially given Italy's then leading role as a cultural center in Europe, and Poland's position as one of Europe's prosperous great powers. After Poland and Italy weakened and both nations came under the influence of expansive foreign powers, the two nations supported each other's independence efforts in the 19th and 20th centuries, and cultural exchanges further intensified and political and economic cooperation strengthened. Italy has an embassy in Warsaw, while Poland has an embassy in Rome, and a consulate-general in Milan.

Italy has given full support to Poland's membership in the European Union and NATO.

== Historical and cultural relations ==
=== Middle Ages ===
Three members of the Polish Piast dynasty were buried in Italian cathedrals. The Saint Andrew Cathedral in Venzone contains the sarcophagus of Duke Bolesław of Bytom, the last duke of the Koźle line of the Piast dynasty, who suddenly died in unknown circumstances during travel in Venzone in 1354. The Pisa Cathedral is the burial site of Władysław of Cieszyn from the Cieszyn line of the Piasts, who suddenly died in Pisa in 1355. The Siena Cathedral contains the tomb of Frederick of Cieszyn from the Cieszyn line of the dynasty, who suddenly died in Italy in 1507.

In 1424–1444, Alexander of Masovia of the Płock line of the Piast dynasty was the Prince-Bishop of Trento.

Troops from Poland and the Italian states of Venice, Genoa and Savoy fought together against the Ottoman invasion of Europe at the Battle of Nicopolis in 1396. The Kingdom of Poland and Papal States were part of a coalition of several European countries in the Crusade of Varna of 1443–1444, which goal was to repel the Ottoman invasion of Europe and liberate the already conquered nations of Southeast Europe.

In 1462, the Genoese colony of Caffa in Crimea recognized Polish suzerainty.

=== Early modern era ===
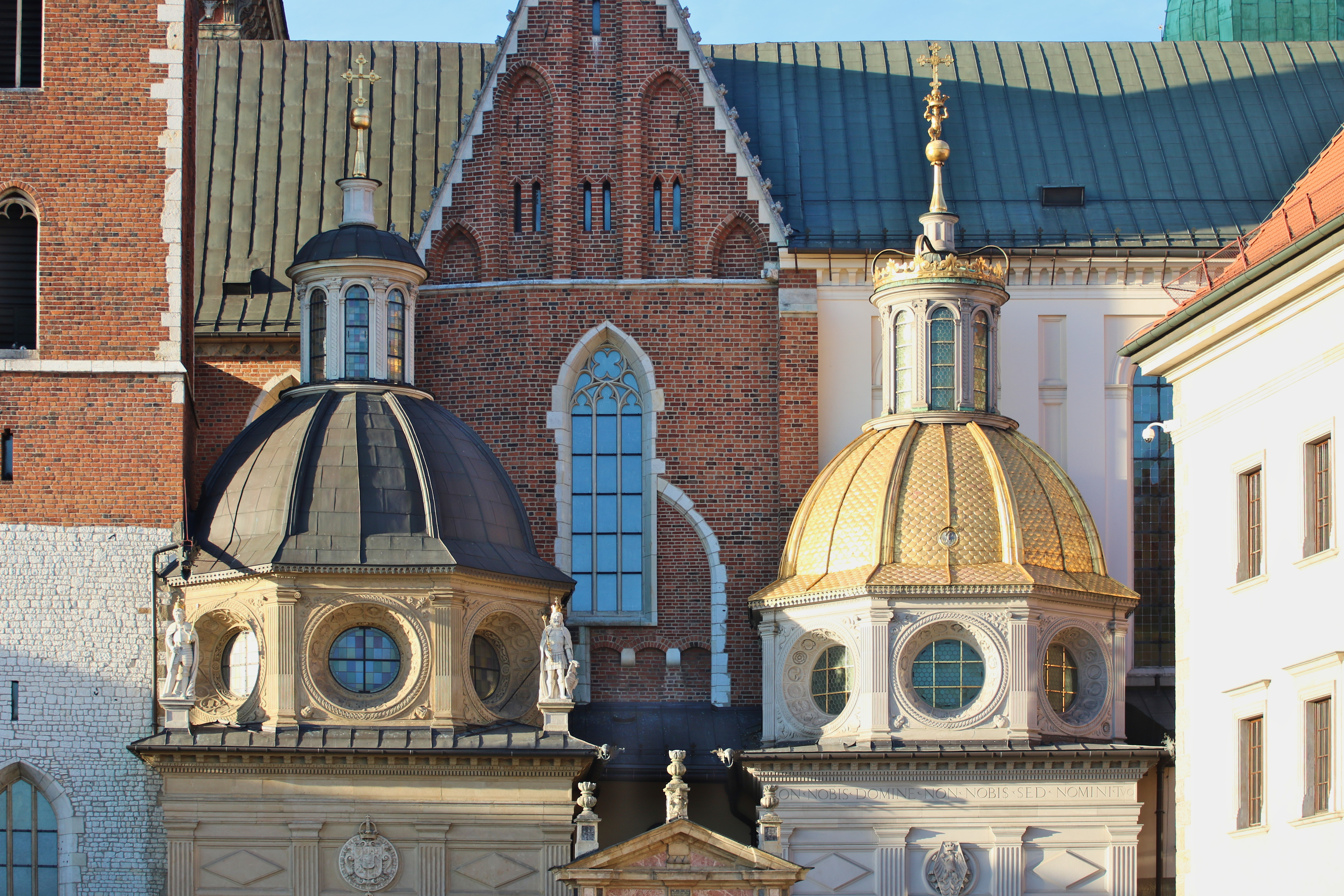
Sigismund's Chapel (on the right) at the Wawel Castle was designed by Bartolomeo Berrecci

Bona Sforza, a member of the powerful Milanese House of Sforza, became in 1518 the second wife of Polish King Sigismund I the Old. Planning to give the Jagiellonian dynasty financial independence, she succeeded in taking over the Grand Duchy of Lithuania in 1536–1546. She is also commonly credited with the introduction of some salads and vegetables in Polish cuisine (still sometimes called włoszczyzna "Italian").

Renaissance in Poland started to spread in the 15th and the 16th centuries. That was a result of Italian artists (Francesco Fiorentino, Bartholommeo Berecci, Santi Gucci, Mateo Gucci, Bernardo Morando, Giovanni Battista di Quadro etc.), merchants (the Boner family, the Montelupi family) and thinkers (Filip Callimachus) who had come to Poland since the late 15th. Most of them came to Kraków, the Polish capital until 1596. Polish scientists and poets studied in Italy: Nicolaus Copernicus in Bologna and at the University of Padua, Witelo, Jan Kochanowski and Klemens Janicki at the University of Padua. Bernardo Morando designed Zamość, Tomaszów Lubelski and a number of buildings.

In 1558, Polish King Sigismund II Augustus established the first permanent postal connection between Kraków and Venice, the capitals of the Kingdom of Poland and the Republic of Venice respectively, thus founding the Royal Post, soon renamed to Poczta Polska (Polish Post), which has been Poland's main postal company ever since.

Since the Late Middle Ages, both Poland and Venice had fought several wars against the expansionist Ottoman Empire. Following the victory of Polish-led forces at the Battle of Vienna at the beginning of the Great Turkish War of 1683–1699, Poland and Venice were allies as part of the Holy League formed in 1684.

Thanks to the traditional tolerance and freedom of Poland and the protection of Polish Kings, some Italian scholars and scientists settled in Poland and created their inventions or demonstrated experiments and achievements there, even if they contradicted official European science. Valerianus Magnus publicly performed a vacuum experiment (Torricelli's experiment) in Warsaw in 1647, whereas Tito Livio Burattini built a model aircraft, which first took to the air in Warsaw in 1648. Burratini was honored with an indygenat, i.e. inclusion in the Polish nobility.

Bernardo Bellotto, known in Poland and Germany as Canaletto (1721–1780), was a Venetian painter who painted 26 views of Warsaw, which were used in rebuilding the city after its nearly-complete destruction by German troops during World War II. Giacomo Casanova visited Poland in 1766. Later, Alessandro Cagliostro arrived.

=== 19th century ===
Antonio Corazzi (1792–1877) was an Italian architect who designed a number of buildings in Warsaw, including Staszic Palace (1820) and Teatr Wielki.

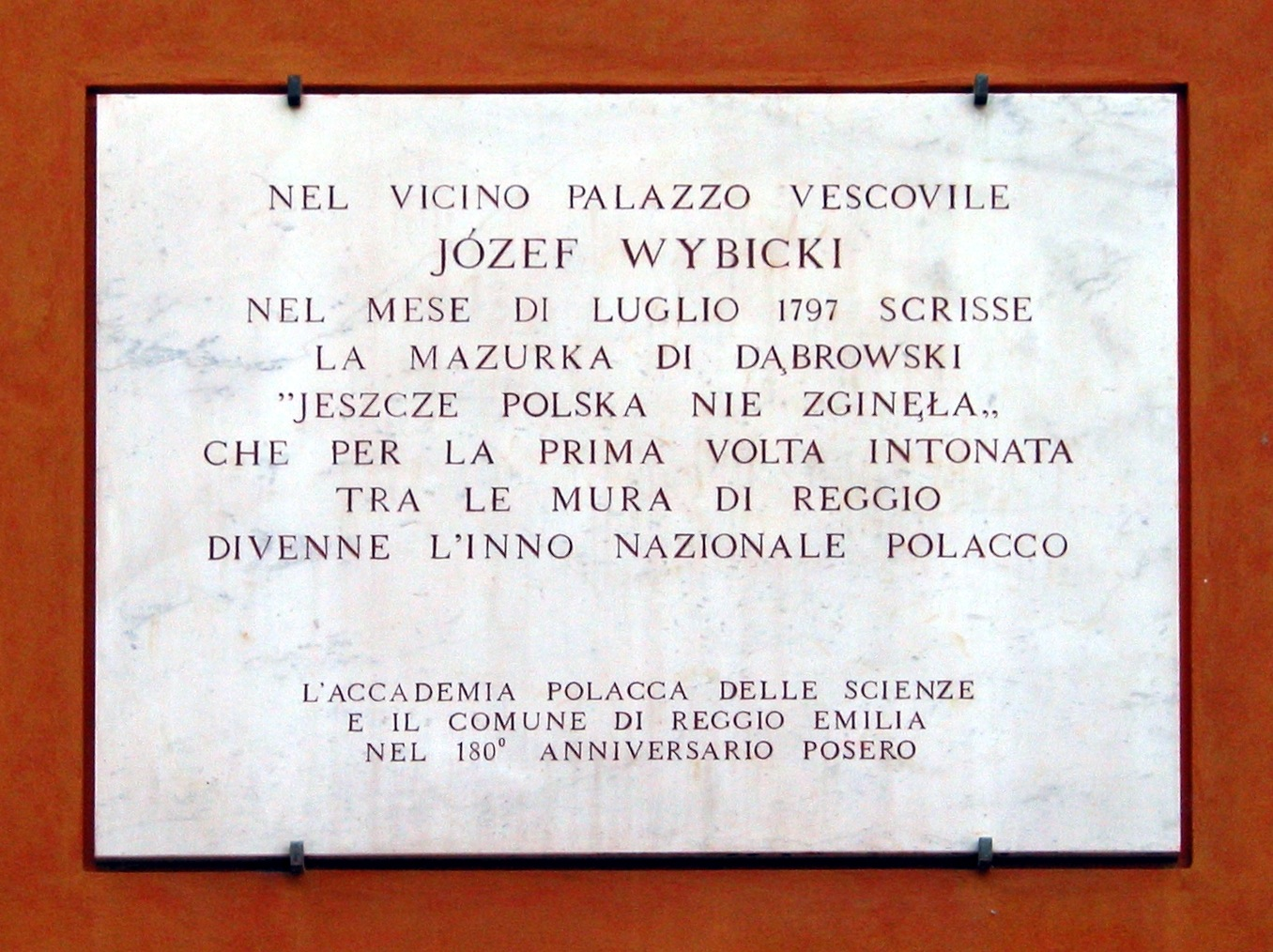
Plaque commemorating the writing of the lyrics of the Polish national anthem by Józef Wybicki in 1797 in Reggio Emilia, Italy

In the Napoleonic Wars, many Polish soldiers, officers and volunteers therefore emigrated, especially to Italy and France. They formed the Polish Legions, considered a Polish army in exile, under French command. Their Polish commanders included Jan Henryk Dąbrowski, Karol Kniaziewicz, Józef Wybicki and Antoni Amilkar Kosiński. It was then that the future Polish national anthem, Mazurek Dąbrowskiego, was created by Józef Wybicki, with words promising 'the return of the Polish army from Italy to Poland'. In tribute, the Italian anthem, Il Canto degli Italiani, mentioned the Polish sacrifice against Austrian and Russian oppressions on Poles: "il sangue Polacco".

Following Austria's conquests and annexations, parts of Poland and Italy belonged to the Austrian Empire (from 1867 Austria-Hungary). The Imperial Royal Austrian State Railways allowed travel between Kraków and Trieste.

The Mickiewicz Legion was a military unit formed in 1848 in Rome by one of the most notable Polish poets, Adam Mickiewicz, who took part in the First Italian War of Independence after the failure of the Greater Poland Uprising of 1848. After unsuccessfully pleading with Pope Pius IX for support, Mickiewicz was joined in Milan by a military detachment of Polish emigrants, led by Mikołaj Kamiński. Growing to 120 members by June, the legion was commanded by Kamiński and engaged in several battles. It fought alongside others in Lombardy and on barricades of Genoa against the royalists to defend the Roman Republic. Apart from the Mickiewicz Legion, Polish generals Wojciech Chrzanowski and Ludwik Mierosławski, who had previously fought in Polish uprisings, also commanded Sardinian and Sicilian units respectively.

Poles were part of the International Legion formed by Giuseppe Garibaldi in 1860 during the Expedition of the Thousand, which paved the way for the creation of a united Kingdom of Italy in 1861. Its commander was Ludwik Mierosławski. Afterwards, Giuseppe Garibaldi, Ludwik Mierosławski and György Klapka decided in Paris that Italian and Hungarian revolutionaries would help in the event of a Polish uprising. In 1861 with the consent of the Italian government the Polish Military School in Genoa was founded, which trained Polish officers in exile. Moved to Cuneo in May 1862, it was closed in July 1862. The overwhelming majority of officers trained there took part in the Polish January Uprising in the Russian Partition of Poland in 1863–1864.

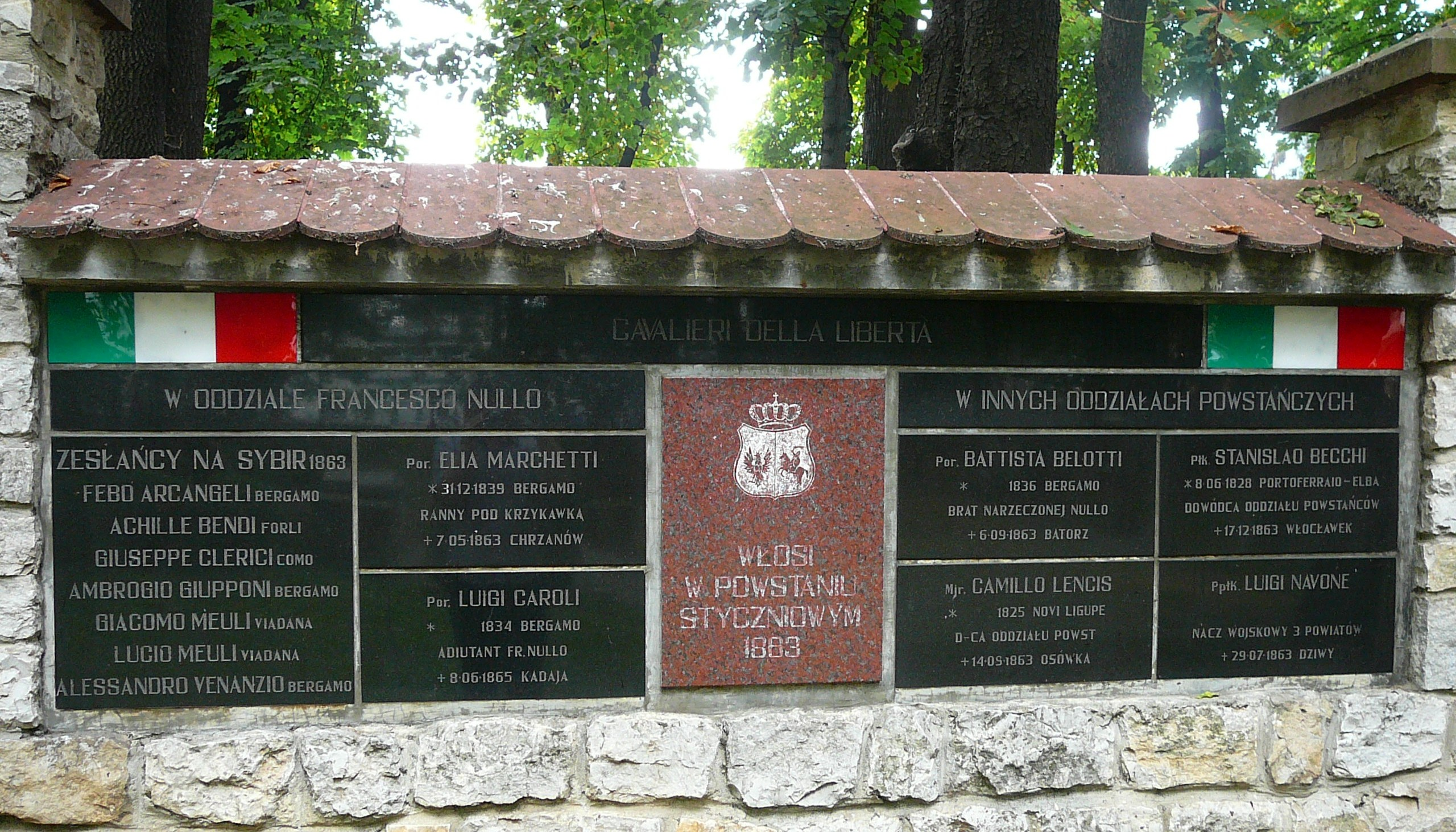
Memorial to Italian volunteers who fought in the Polish January Uprising of 1863–1864, Olkusz, Poland

The Garibaldi Legion was a unit of Italian volunteers who fought for Polish independence in the January Uprising of 1863. The unit was named after the Italian revolutionary and nationalist Giuseppe Garibaldi, organised in Italy by his son Menotti Garibaldi and led by General Francesco Nullo. He arrived in Kraków from Italy in April 1863. The unit's first battle in Poland was at Podłęże on May 3, 1863, and it defeated a Russian force. It then took part in the Battle of Krzykawka; with the French, it organised Zouaves of Death and suffered heavy casualties. Nullo was killed and his adjutant was wounded and died several days later. Francesco Nullo is considered a hero of independence in both Italy and Poland.

=== 20th century ===
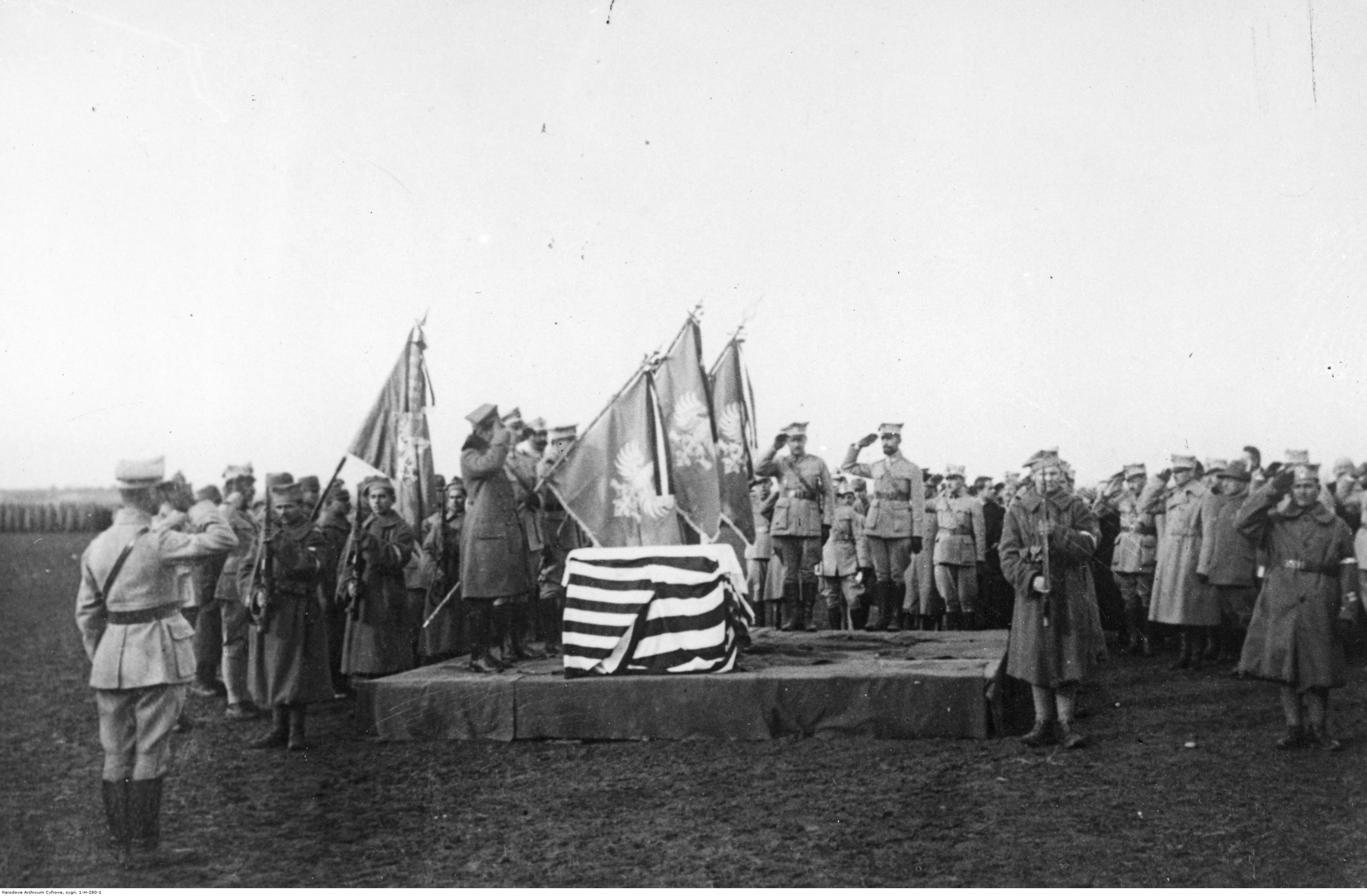
Consecration of four banners gifted by Italian cities at the Polish military camp in Chivasso in 1919

During World War I, two POW camps were established in Italy (in Chivasso and Santa Maria Capua Vetere) for soldiers of Polish nationality from the Austro-Hungarian Army, who were then allowed to leave Italy and join the Polish Blue Army in France. The Italian government and people were friendly towards the Polish troops. Also, during the war, Poles from the Russian Partition of Poland conscripted to the Russian Army and Italians were among Allied prisoners of war held by the Germans in a POW camp in Stargard in modern northwestern Poland. Following the war, in 1918, Poland regained independence, and Italy was the first country in Europe to recognise it. Italy supported Poland in the Polish–Soviet War of 1919–1921, and sold large amounts of weapons to Poland, including millions of rifles and bullets, 45 cannons and many uniforms. The Italian ambassador to Poland, Francesco Tommasini, was the only foreign ambassador (apart from the apostolic nuncio) who stayed in Warsaw the day before the Russian attack on the city (see Battle of Warsaw (1920)). The Italian national anthem, Il Canto degli Italiani, and the Polish national anthem, Poland Is Not Yet Lost, bear mutual historical references.

==== World War II ====
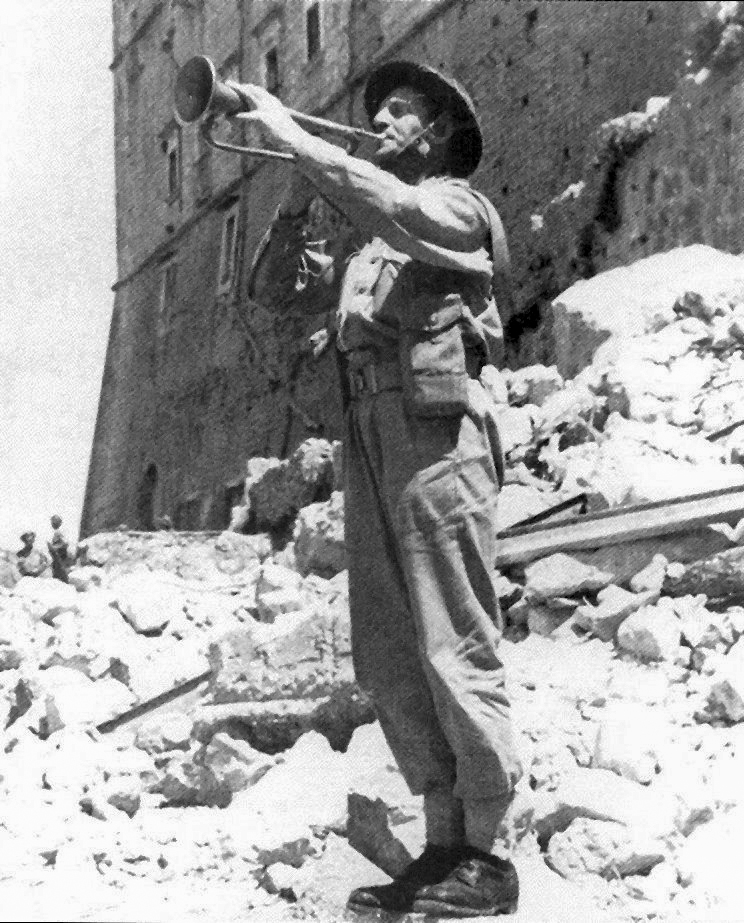
The Battle of Monte Cassino, a Polish bugler plays the Hejnał mariacki, announcing the victory

Italy did not approve of Germany's invasion of Poland, which started World War II in 1939. Some of the escape routes of Poles who fled from occupied Poland to Hungary and Romania led through Italy. Via Italy the Poles further reached Polish-allied France, where the Polish Army was reconstituted to continue the fight against Germany. The Polish II Corps participated in the Italian Campaign, and 11,379 men died, many of them being buried at the Monte Cassino Polish War Cemetery or at Casamassima. Meanwhile, despite little contact between Italians and Poles throughout the war, the Italian Army was believed to be among the most lenient toward Poles and never treated Poles as brutally as their German counterparts.

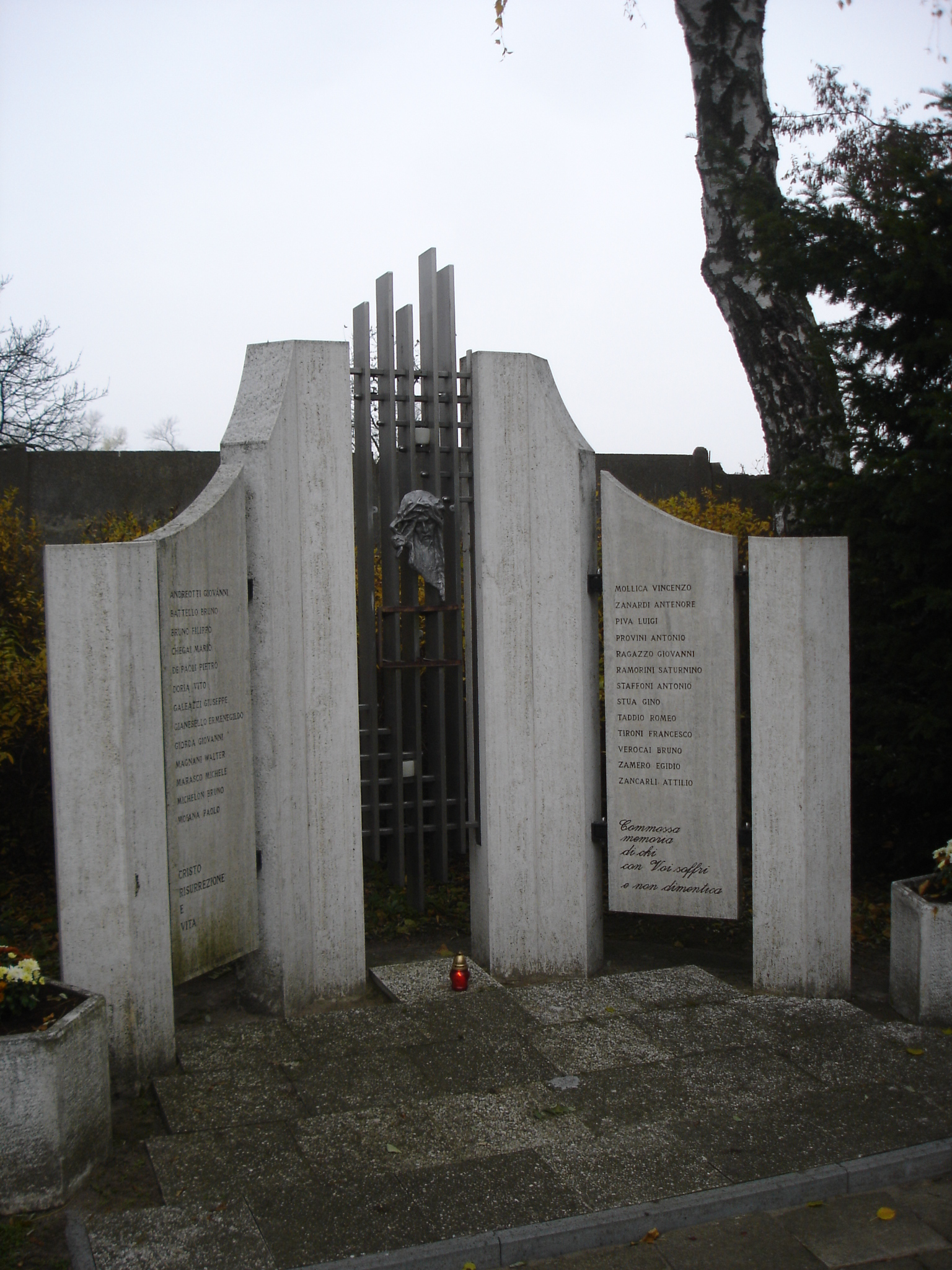
Memorial to Italian POWs who died in the Stalag II-D camp, Stargard, Poland

After Italy switched sides to the Allies, many Italian soldiers were interned in German prisoner-of-war camps and forced labour camps in German-occupied Poland, where they suffered from malnutrition, infectious diseases, beatings, and mass killings (as in Chełm, Przemyśl and Międzyrzec Podlaski). Polish eyewitnesses described Italian prisoners at the Stalag 327 camp in Przemyśl as "looking like skeletons". Poles provided food to starving Italians, as in the Stalag 366 camp in Biała Podlaska, despite the threat of being shot on sight by German guards, for both Italians and Poles for such attempts, with confirmed cases of such killings. There were also cases of secret cooperation between Italians and Poles, for example, Italian forced labourers in a factory in Zakrze received food from Poles in exchange for stolen materials from the factory. Surviving Italian prisoners were subjected to German-perpetrated death marches through Polish territory. During one of the marches, the Germans committed a massacre of six Italian generals at Kuźnica Żelichowska, who were then buried by local Poles after the German withdrawal. Thousands of former Italian POWs stayed for several weeks or months after the war in Oleśnica and Żagań, with Italians in Oleśnica even organizing artistic shows to which they invited local young Polish activists.

==== Post-war ====
The Polish writer Gustaw Herling-Grudziński settled in Naples, where he married Lidia, a daughter of the philosopher Benedetto Croce. He also wrote for the Italian Tempo presente, run by Nicola Chiaromonte, and for various dailies and periodicals. His book A World Apart: Imprisonment in a Soviet Labor Camp During World War II was published in Italy in 1958. The Polish journal Kultura was originally published in Rome. The Polish writer Jarosław Iwaszkiewicz has written several texts about Italy like the book "Italian Novellas", an libretto of King Roger, an opera by Karol Szymanowski.

The Polish–Italian 1946 movie Wielka droga was the only uncensored Polish movie until 1989. The Polish comedy Giuseppe in Warsaw presents adventures of an Italian soldier in German-occupied Warsaw.

Polski Fiat was a Polish car brand. Fiat 508 was produced in Poland since 1932, Polski Fiat 125p since 1967 and later Fiat 126 and others. Lancia Ypsilon will be produced in Tychy.

In June to December 1966, Italian and Polish diplomats bore a joint effort to reach a compromise solution to the Vietnam War, thanks to the Italian ambassador in Saigon, Giovanni D'Orlandi, and his Polish counterpart, Janusz Lewandowski (member of the International Control Commission), in the so-called Operation Marigold. The peace efforts were supported by Italian Foreign Minister Amintore Fanfani. The final compromise reached between D'Orlandi and Lewandowski in September included free elections under international control within two years, a South Vietnam government including a broad coalition, and keeping to a policy of neutrality and a final withdrawal of American troops. The peace efforts were halted by the American bombing restarting on Hanoi on December 2 and 4.

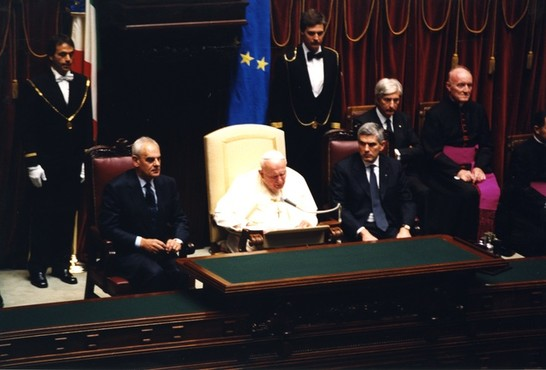
Visit of Pope John Paul II in the Chamber of Deputies (Italian Parliament) in 2002

In 1978, the Pole Karol Wojtyla was elected as Catholic Pope, the first non-Italian pope since the 16th century, and took the name John Paul II.

The Italian singers Farida, Drupi, Marco Antonelli, and In-Grid have been popular in Poland, sometimes more than in Italy. The Polish songwriter and singer Czesław Niemen performed in Italy in 1969 and 1970, participated in Cantagiro and produced several singles in Italian like "Arcobaleno" ("Over the Rainbow").

Italy strongly supported Poland's efforts to join NATO and the European Union, which Poland eventually joined in 1999 and 2004, respectively.

=== 21st century ===
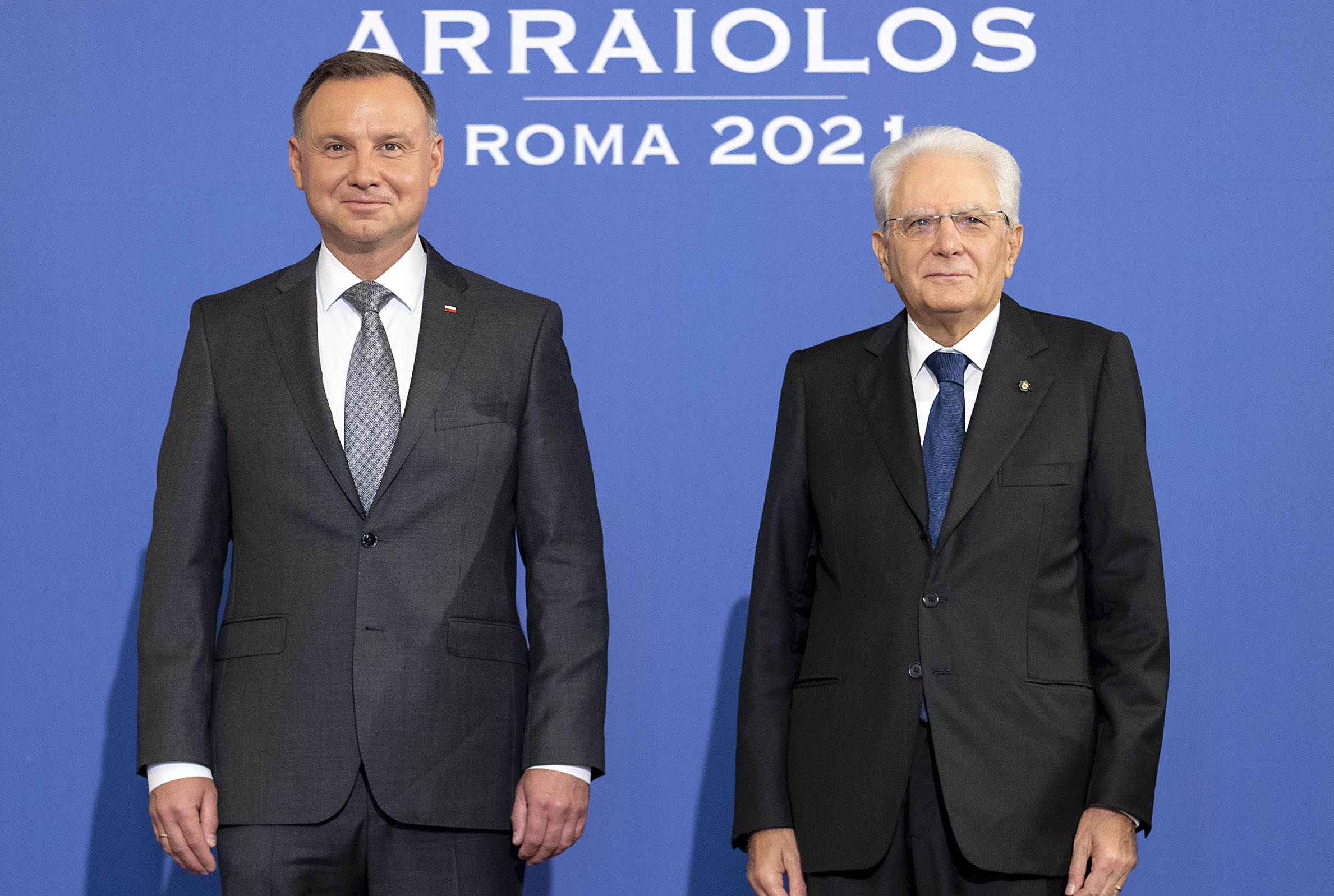
President of Italy Sergio Mattarella met with the President of Poland Andrzej Duda in Rome, 2021

In 2003, both countries supported the Invasion of Iraq by a US-led coalition. Poland took part in the invasion operations, Italy only in the post-invasion occupation of Iraq.

The Day of the Siege: September Eleven 1683 is a Polish–Italian movie directed by Renzo Martinelli about the Battle of Vienna.

Polish soldiers are part of the Allied Joint Force Command Naples based in southern Italy.

In 2019, Italian Deputy Prime Minister Matteo Salvini arrived in Warsaw to discuss a political alliance between the two nations ahead of the upcoming 2019 European Parliament election. The idea was met with "satisfaction" from Jarosław Kaczyński, the leader of the Polish ruling party.

A conference celebrating the centenary of diplomatic relations between Italy and Poland was held in Rome in 2019. The conference was attended by professors and diplomats from both countries, who described Polish-Italian relations as "excellent".

Following the outbreak of the COVID-19 pandemic in Italy, in March 2020, in gesture of solidarity with Italy, the Italian flag was displayed as an illumination at the Polish Presidential Palace in Warsaw, and Italy's name was illuminated on the National Stadium in Warsaw. Also, in an effort to help Italy, Poland sent 15 doctors and paramedics to Brescia in March 2020, and then sent medical supplies to Italy, beginning with 20,000 litres of Polish-produced disinfectants sent to Veneto on April 7, 2020.

== Current foreign relations ==
- Both countries are full members of the Council of Europe, of the Organisation for Economic Co-operation and Development, of NATO, of the Organization for Security and Co-operation in Europe, of the European Union, and of the World Trade Organization.

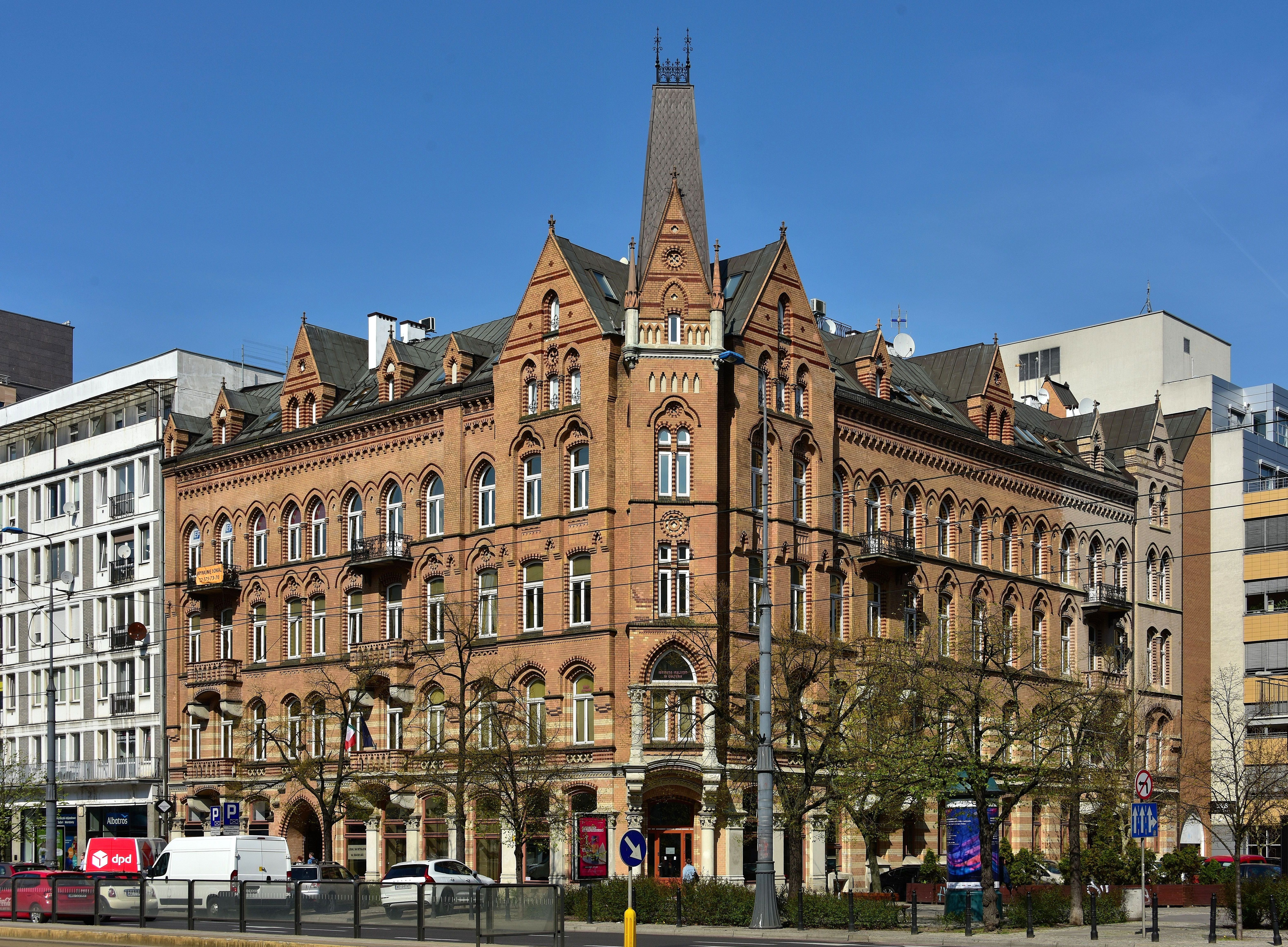
Seat of the Italian Cultural Institute in Warsaw

- There is a Polish Institute in Rome, and there are Italian Cultural Institutes in Warsaw and Kraków.
- There are four major Polish military cemeteries in Italy, located in Bologna, Casamassima, Loreto, Monte Cassino, and two major Italian military cemeteries in Poland, located in Warsaw and Wrocław. There are also Polish military quarters in Chivasso and Santa Maria Capua Vetere, and several smaller Italian military cemeteries or quarters in Poland, including in Biała Podlaska, Błądzim, Bolesławiec, Dąbrowa Górnicza, Międzyrzec Podlaski, Nowe Opole and Przemyśl.
- Both of the countries' largest religion is Roman Catholicism.

== Diplomatic missions ==
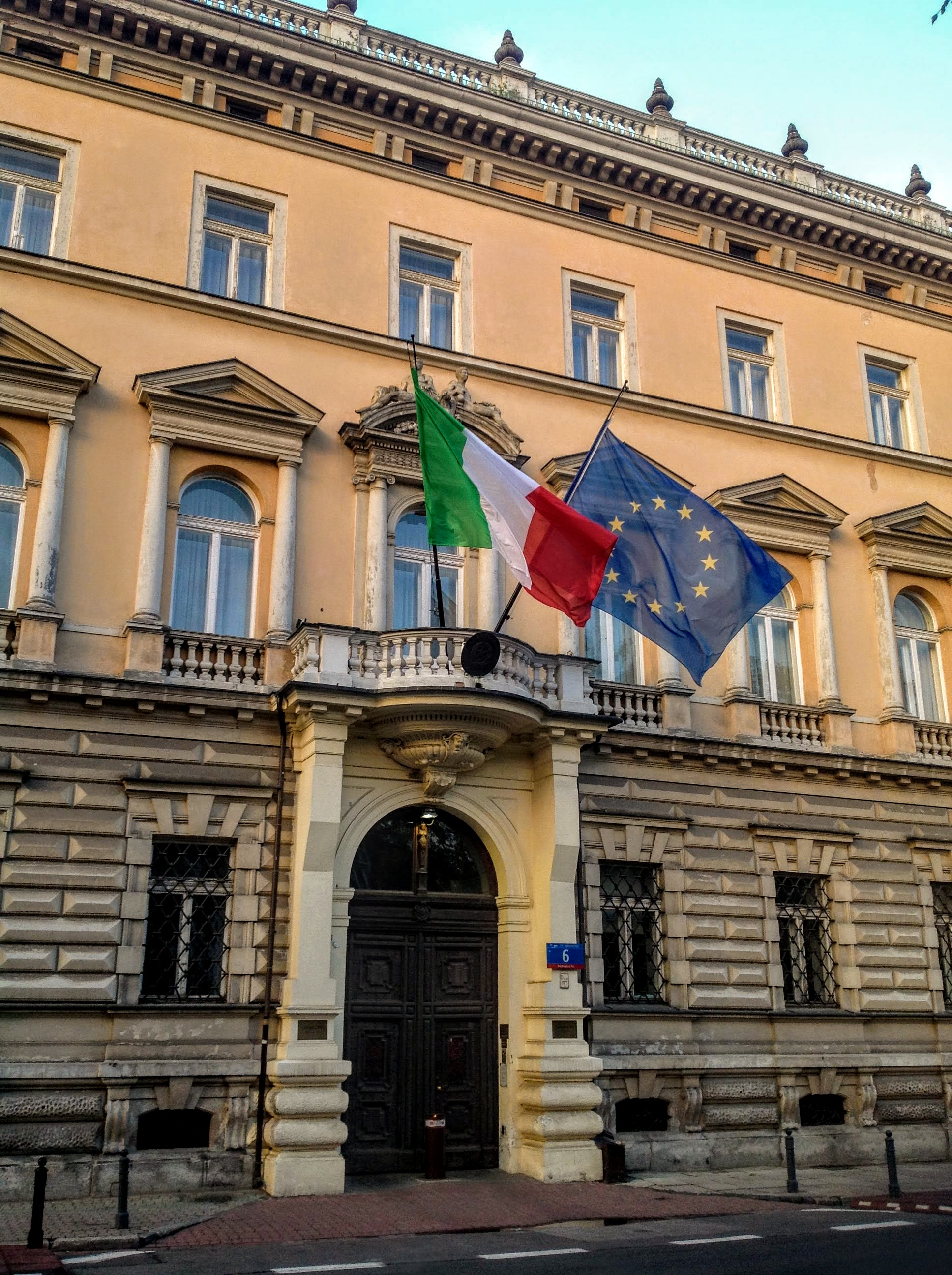
Italian Embassy in Warsaw

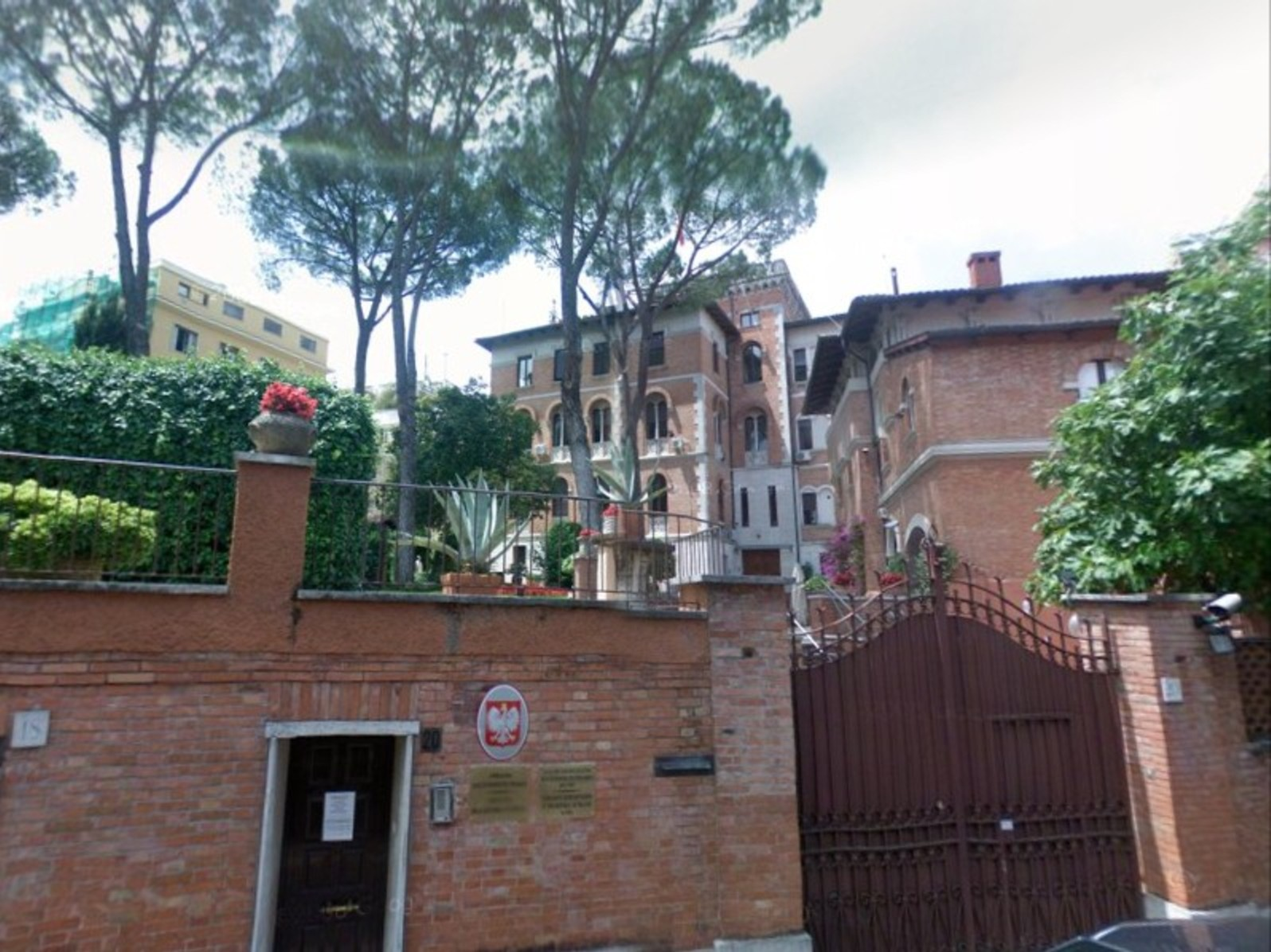
Polish Embassy in Rome

- Italy has an embassy in Warsaw and three consular correspondents (in Bielsko-Biała, Zamość and Zielona Góra).
- Poland has an embassy in Rome and a general consulate in Milan.

== Diaspora ==
- There are around 98,263 Poles living in Italy.
- There are around 5,166 Italians living in Poland.

== See also ==
- Foreign relations of Italy
- Foreign relations of Poland
- List of twin towns and sister cities in Italy
- List of twin towns and sister cities in Poland
