= Francesco Nullo Memorial =

Monument in Warsaw, Poland

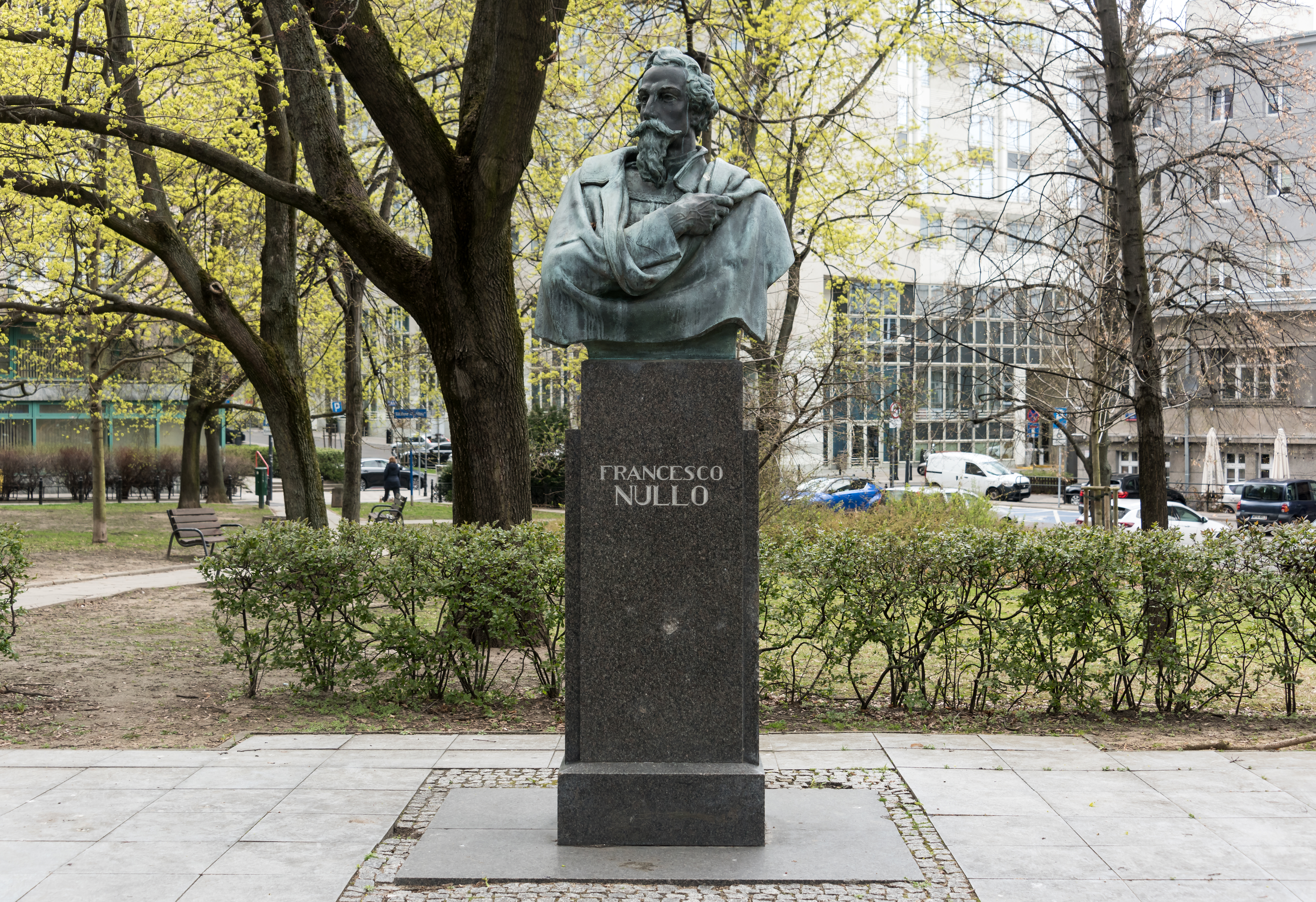
- The monument in 2022.
- Interactive map of Francesco Nullo Memorial
- Location: Frascati Street, Warsaw, Poland
- Coordinates: 52°13′38.96″N 21°01′36.55″E
- Designer: Gianni Remuzzi
- Type: Bust
- Material: Bronze, granite
- Height: 2.5 m (8 ft 2 in)
- Opening date: 26 February 1939
- Dedicated to: Francesco Nullo

The Francesco Nullo Memorial (Note: Polish: Pomnik Francesca Nulla; Italian: Monumento a Francesco Nullo) is a monument in Warsaw, Poland, in the Downtown district and Frascati neighbourhood. Situated at Home Army Miłosz Battalion Square, near the corner of Frascati and Nulla Streets, it comprises a bust of Francesco Nullo – a 19th-century military officer who fought in the conflicts of the Italian unification and commanded the Garibaldi Legion of Italian volunteers, fighting on the side of Polish insurgents during the January Uprising. The monument was designed by Gianni Remuzzi, and unveiled on 26 February 1939.

== History ==
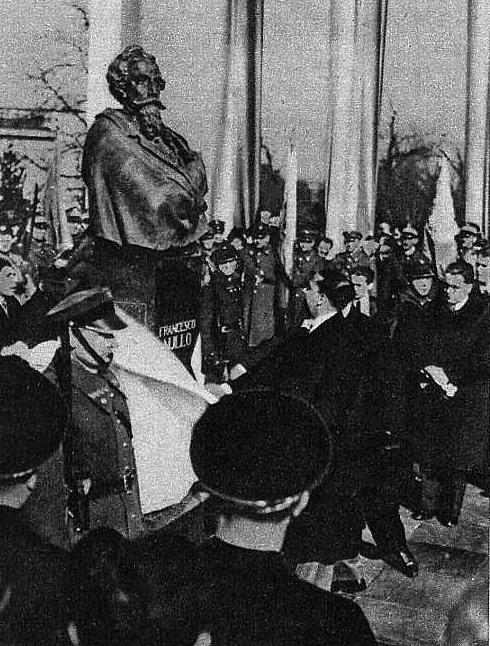
The unveiling of the monument in 1939.

The monument was designed by sculptor Gianni Remuzzi, and decided to Francesco Nullo, a 19th-century military officer who fought in the conflicts of the Italian unification, and was the commander of the Garibaldi Legion of Italian volunteers, fighting on the side of Polish insurgents during the January Uprising.

The monument was founded by the city of Bergamo in Italy, the hometown of Nullo, and gifted to the city of Warsaw. It was unveiled on 26 February 1939 by Galeazzo Ciano, the Minister of Foreign Affairs of Italy. The ceremony was also attended by the delegatation from Bergamo.

The monument was slightly damaged during the Second World War. Following the renovation works, it was again unveiled in 1949.

== Characteristics ==
The monument is placed at the Home Army Miłosz Battalion Square, near the corner of Frascati Street and Francesca Nulla Street, within the Downtown district. It has the total height of 2.5 m. It consists of a bronze bust of Francesco Nullo, featuring him with large beard and mustache. He is holding the tail of a military coat over his shoulder with his right hand. It is placed on a grey and red granite pedestal. At its front is inscribed his name in majuscule letters. At the back is installed a plaque with the inscription as transcribed below.

Polish inscription

Ur. w Bergamo 11 marca 1826 r. Garibaldczyk. Bojownik o niepodległość i zjednoczenie Italii. Walczył za wolność Polski w Powstaniu Styczniowym i poległ w bitwie pod Krzykawką dnia 5 maja 1863 r.

English translation

Born in Bergamo on 11 March 1826. A Garibaldian. A warrior of the independence and unification of Italy. He fought for the freedom of Poland in the January Uprising, and fell in the battle of Krzykawka on 5 May 1863.
