= Krzykawka =

- Village
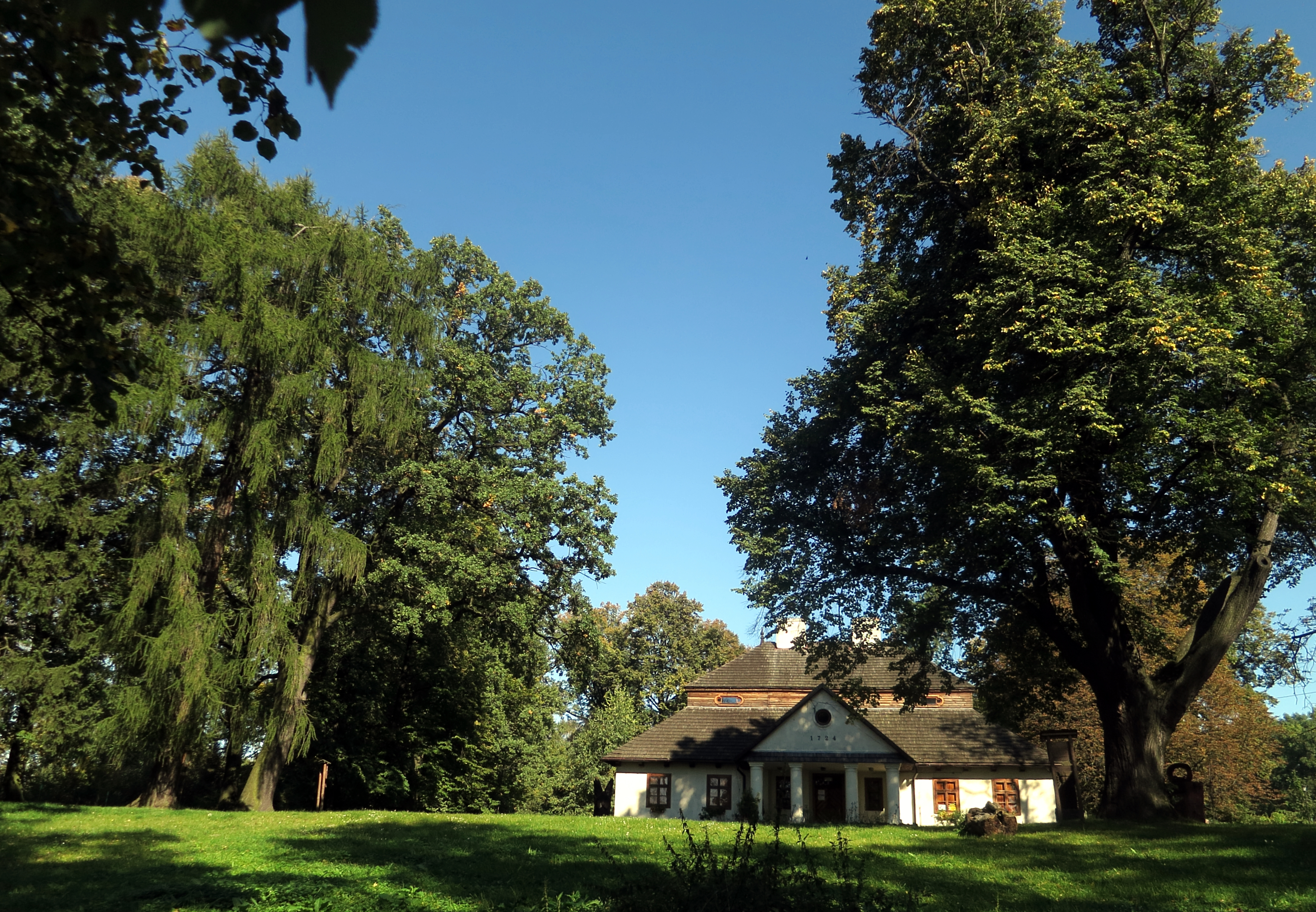
- Old Polish manor house in Krzykawka

- Location within Poland
- Coordinates: 50°17′N 19°34′E
- Country: Poland
- Voivodeship: Lesser Poland
- County: Olkusz
- Gmina: Bolesław
- Population: 830
- Time zone: UTC+1 (CET)
  - Summer (DST): UTC+2 (CEST)
- Vehicle registration: KOL

Krzykawka [kʂɨˈkafka] is a village in the administrative district of Gmina Bolesław, within Olkusz County, Lesser Poland Voivodeship, in southern Poland.

During the January Uprising, on 5 May 1863, the Battle of Krzykawka was fought near the village between Polish insurgents supported by Italian and French volunteers and Russian troops. Italian commander Francesco Nullo, hero of Italian and Polish independence fights, died in the battle, and there is a monument dedicated to him in the village.
