= Międzygórze =

Międzygórze may refer to the following places in Poland:

- Międzygórze, Lower Silesian Voivodeship (south-west Poland)
- Międzygórze, Pomeranian Voivodeship (north Poland)
- Międzygórze, Lesser Poland Voivodeship (south Poland)
