= Krze, Olkusz County =

Krze
- Village
- Location within Poland
- Coordinates: 50°18′0″N 19°26′11″E
- Country: Poland
- Voivodeship: Lesser Poland
- County: Olkusz
- Gmina: Bolesław

Krze [kʂɛ] is a village in the administrative district of Gmina Bolesław, within Olkusz County, Lesser Poland Voivodeship, in southern Poland.
