= Krzykawa =

- Village
- Location within Poland
- Coordinates: 50°18′35″N 19°25′32″E
- Country: Poland
- Voivodeship: Lesser Poland
- County: Olkusz
- Gmina: Bolesław
- Population: 520

Krzykawa [kʂɨˈkava] is a village in the administrative district of Gmina Bolesław, within Olkusz County, Lesser Poland Voivodeship, in southern Poland.
