= Bolesław, Olkusz County =

Bolesław
- Village
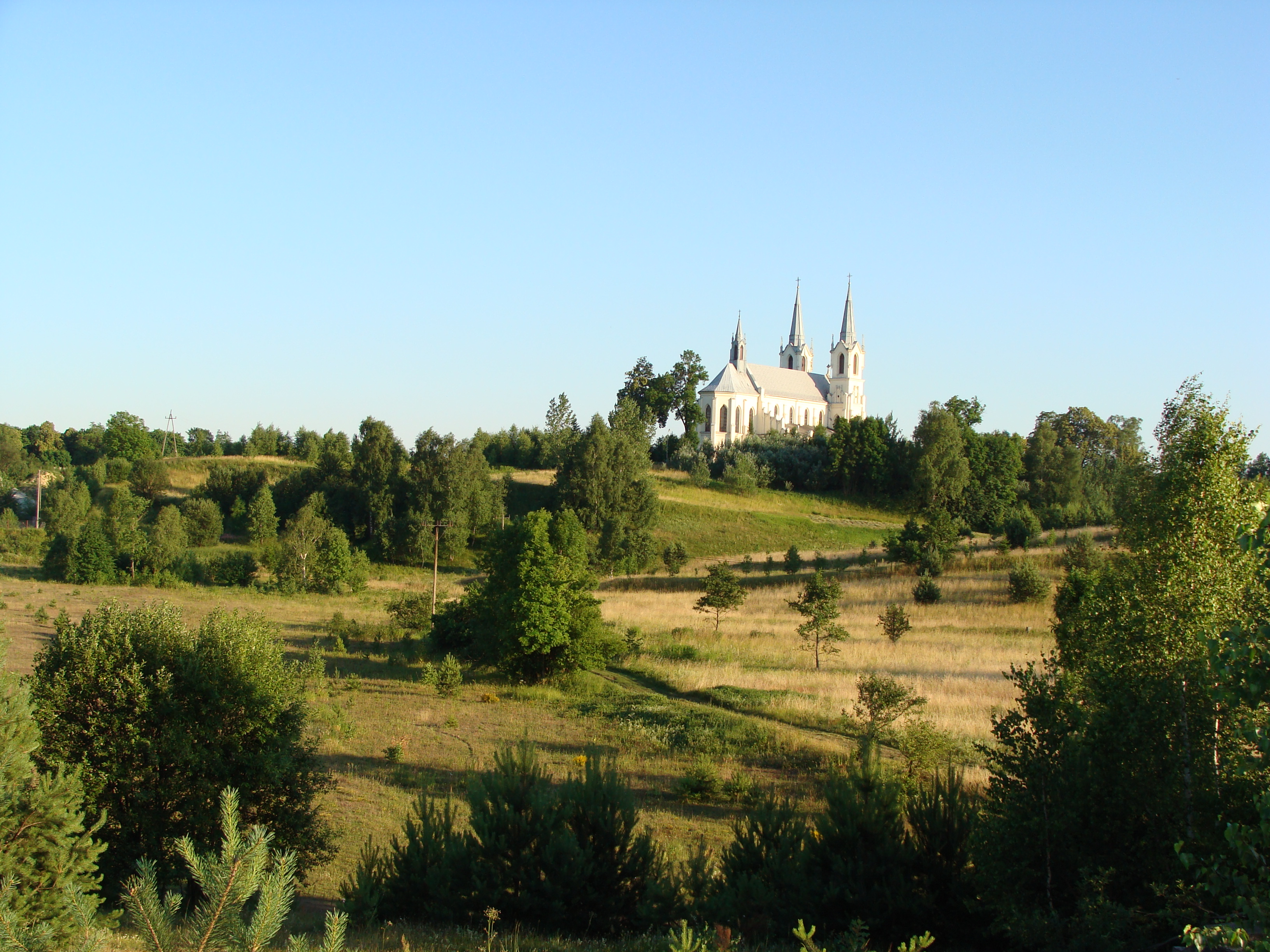

- Location within Poland
- Coordinates: 50°17′54″N 19°28′19″E
- Country: Poland
- Voivodeship: Lesser Poland
- County: Olkusz
- Gmina: Bolesław
- Founded: 1279
- Founder: Bolesław the Pious
- Named for: Bolesław the Pious

Population
  - Total: 2,500
- Time zone: UTC+1 (CET)
  - Summer (DST): UTC+2 (CEST)
- Vehicle registration: KOL

Bolesław [bɔˈlɛswaf] is a village in Olkusz County, Lesser Poland Voivodeship, in southern Poland. It is the seat of the gmina (administrative district) called Gmina Bolesław.

== History ==
The village was founded in 1279 by Polish monarch Bolesław V the Chaste and named after him. In 1814, a calamine mine was opened. In 1827, the village had a population of 467, which tripled by the late 19th century. In the late 19th century, there was a brewery and distillery in Bolesław. The village was located on a route connecting Będzin and Olkusz.

== International relations ==
Bolesław has a partnership with:

- Bergamo, Italy
