= Hutki, Lesser Poland Voivodeship =

Hutki
- Village
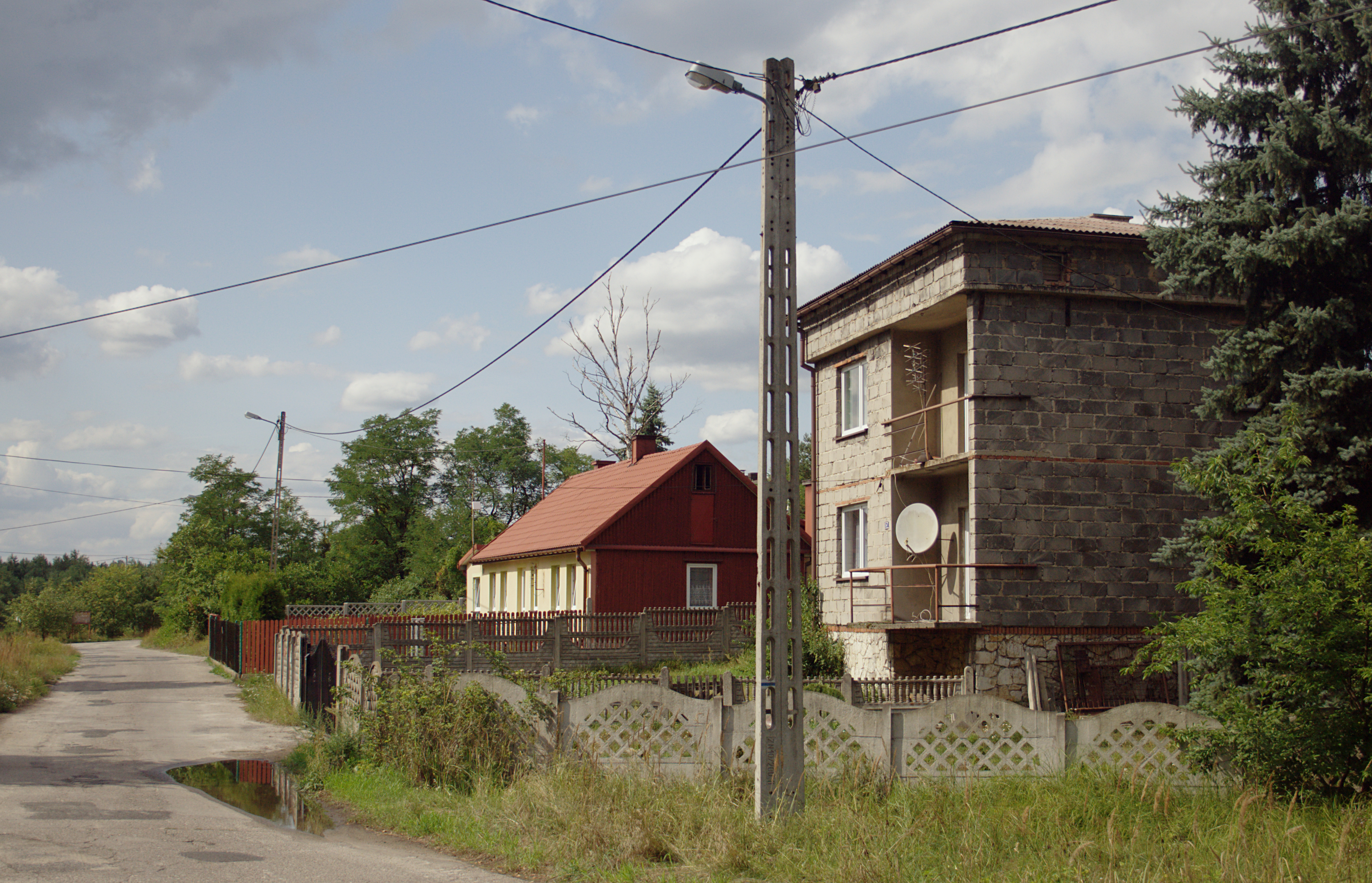

- Location within Poland
- Coordinates: 50°18′28″N 19°30′0″E
- Country: Poland
- Voivodeship: Lesser Poland
- County: Olkusz
- Gmina: Bolesław

Hutki [ˈxutki] is a village in the administrative district of Gmina Bolesław, within Olkusz County, Lesser Poland Voivodeship, in southern Poland.
