= Nowy Ujków =

- Village
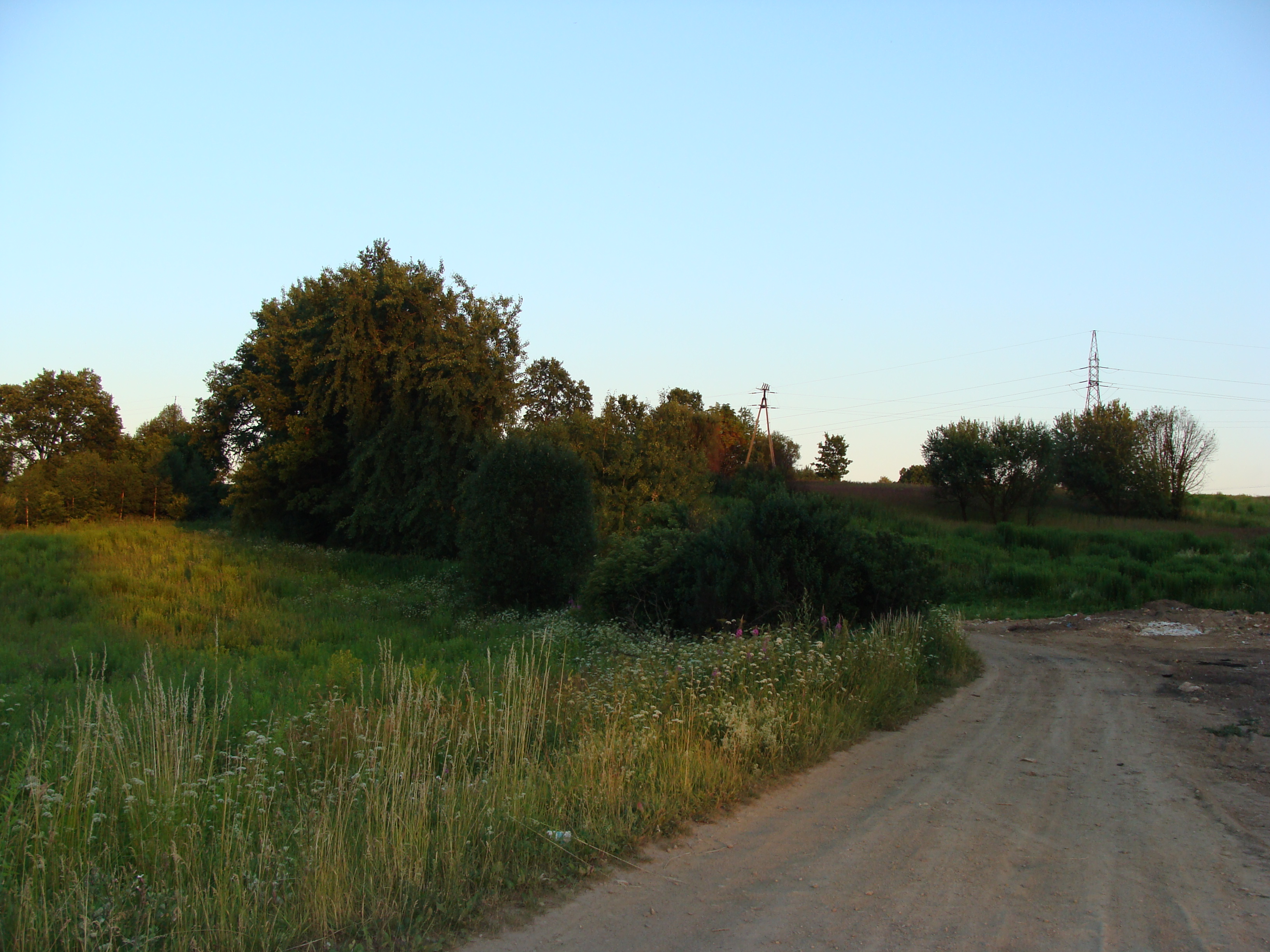

- Location within Poland
- Coordinates: 50°18′24″N 19°26′51″E
- Country: Poland
- Voivodeship: Lesser Poland
- County: Olkusz
- Gmina: Bolesław

Nowy Ujków [ˈnɔvɨ ˈui̯kuf] is a village in the administrative district of Gmina Bolesław, within Olkusz County, Lesser Poland Voivodeship, in southern Poland.
