= Gmina Bolesław, Olkusz County =

Gmina Bolesław Bolesław Commune
- Gmina
- Coat of arms
- Interactive map of Gmina Bolesław
- Coordinates (Bolesław): 50°17′54″N 19°28′19″E
- Country: Poland
- Voivodeship: Lesser Poland
- County: Olkusz
- Seat: Bolesław

Area
  - Total: 41.42 km^{2} (15.99 sq mi)

Population (2006)
  - Total: 7,822
  - Density: 188.8/km^{2} (489.1/sq mi)
- Website: www.gminaboleslaw.pl

Gmina Bolesław is a rural gmina (administrative district) in Olkusz County, Lesser Poland Voivodeship, in southern Poland. Its seat is the village of Bolesław, which lies approximately 7 kilometres (4 mi) west of Olkusz and 43 km (27 mi) north-west of the regional capital Kraków.

The gmina covers an area of 41.42 square kilometres (16.0 sq mi), and as of 2006 its total population is 7,822.

== Villages ==
Gmina Bolesław contains the villages and settlements of Bolesław, Hutki, Krążek, Krze, Krzykawa, Krzykawka, Laski, Małobądz, Międzygórze, Nowy Ujków and Ujków Nowy Kolonia.

== Neighbouring gminas ==
Gmina Bolesław is bordered by the towns of Bukowno, Dąbrowa Górnicza and Sławków, and by the gminas of Klucze and Olkusz.
