= Małobądz, Lesser Poland Voivodeship =

Małobądz
- Village
- Location within Poland
- Coordinates: 50°18′02″N 19°26′10″E
- Country: Poland
- Voivodeship: Lesser Poland
- County: Olkusz
- Gmina: Bolesław
- Population: 600

Małobądz [maˈwɔbɔnt͡s] is a village in the administrative district of Gmina Bolesław, within Olkusz County, Lesser Poland Voivodeship, in southern Poland.
