= Battle of Krzykawka =

Battle between Poland and Russia during the January Uprising

- Part of the January Uprising
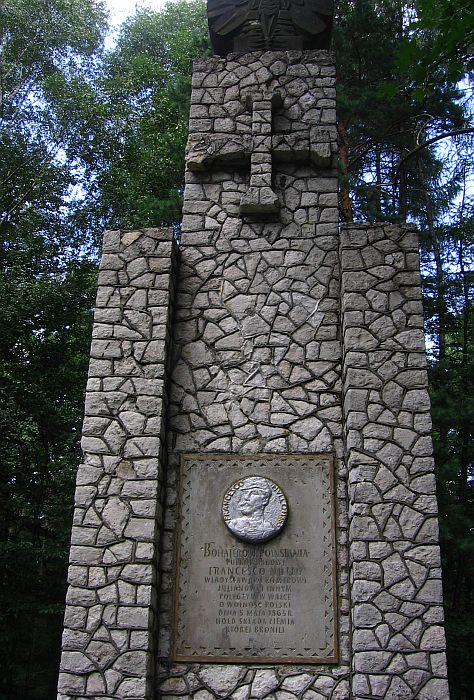
- Monument to Francesco Nullo in Krzykawka
Date	5 May 1863
Location	Krzykawka 50.312018°N 19.420015°E
Result	Russian victory

Belligerents
(Poland) Polish insurgents Garibaldi Legion (Italian volunteers)	Russian Empire

Commanders and leaders
(Poland) Józef Miniewski; Nullo †	Aleksandr Ivanovich Shakhovskoy

Strength
600	Unknown
- Location within Poland

Battle of Krzykawka was a military engagement that took place during the January Uprising on May 5, 1863, between Russian forces and Polish insurgents and foreign (Italian and French) volunteers allied with them. It took place close to the village of Krzykawka near Olkusz. The Polish forces were led by general Józef Miniewski and included the Italian Garibaldi Legion under the command of Francesco Nullo. The outcome of the engagement was a victory for the Russian forces.

== Background ==
Francesco Nullo, a fighter for the Italian reunification, was also a supporter of the Polish cause. Nullo, with a selected cadre of volunteers (sometimes known as the Garibaldi Legion), reached Kraków in April 1863. They were incorporated into the unit of colonel Józef Miniewski. The Legion crossed the borders of Congress Poland on the night of May the 3rd and the 4th near Ostrężnica and Czyżówka, after organizing in Krzeszowice. Early in the morning of the 4th the unit's first battle in Poland occurred at Podłęże where it defeated a Russian force (the garrison from Olkusz). With a Polish unit commanded by colonel Miniewski, he marched on Olkusz. In the night of May the 4th to 5th or in the early morning of May the 5th they reached Krzykawka, where they set up a camp.

== Battle ==
Soon after setting a camp on the morning of the 5th the insurgents were attacked by Russian troops coming from Olkusz.

Miniewski was the overall Polish commander. Nullo commanded the right wing, and count Czapski, the left. The insurgents numbered about 600 soldiers, divided into four companies; the unit had only a dozen or so cavalrymen. Polish forces included the twenty or so Italians from the Garibaldi's Legion and several French volunteers, remnants of the Zouaves of Death. Russian forces were composed of three companies (7th and 9th companies of the Vitebsk Infantry Regiment and the 4th Company of the 7th Riflemen Battalion) and were commanded by prince Szachowski, commander of the Olkusz garrison.

At first, both sides kept at distance, about 250 meters, and exchanged sporadic fire. Nullo, worried that the Russians may be trying to outflank the insurgents, ordered a charge. In the first stage of the battle, the insurgents pushed the Russian troops back in close fighting; but subsequent Russian reinforcements consisting of three companies turned the tide and the insurgents and their foreign allies suffered heavy casualties and were forced to retreat. The battle lasted until two in the afternoon.

Nullo was mortally injured, hit by a Cossack bullet while preparing (or leading - sources vary) a charge he ordered; he had only time to whisper, in Bergamo dialect:So' mort! (I'm dead). Nullo's adjutant, Elia Marchetti was mortally wounded and died two days later. Prisoners including some Italians were deported to Siberia, among them were Nullo's friend from Bergamo, Luigi Caroli and Giovanni Rustici from Corniglio. About 30 insurgents were taken prisoner by the Russians, including 14 French and Italians.

== Remembrance ==
Today, near the village of Krzykawka, on the battlefield called "Podlaska", a monument commemorates the fallen insurrectionists and their foreign allies.
