= Ujków Nowy Kolonia =

- Village
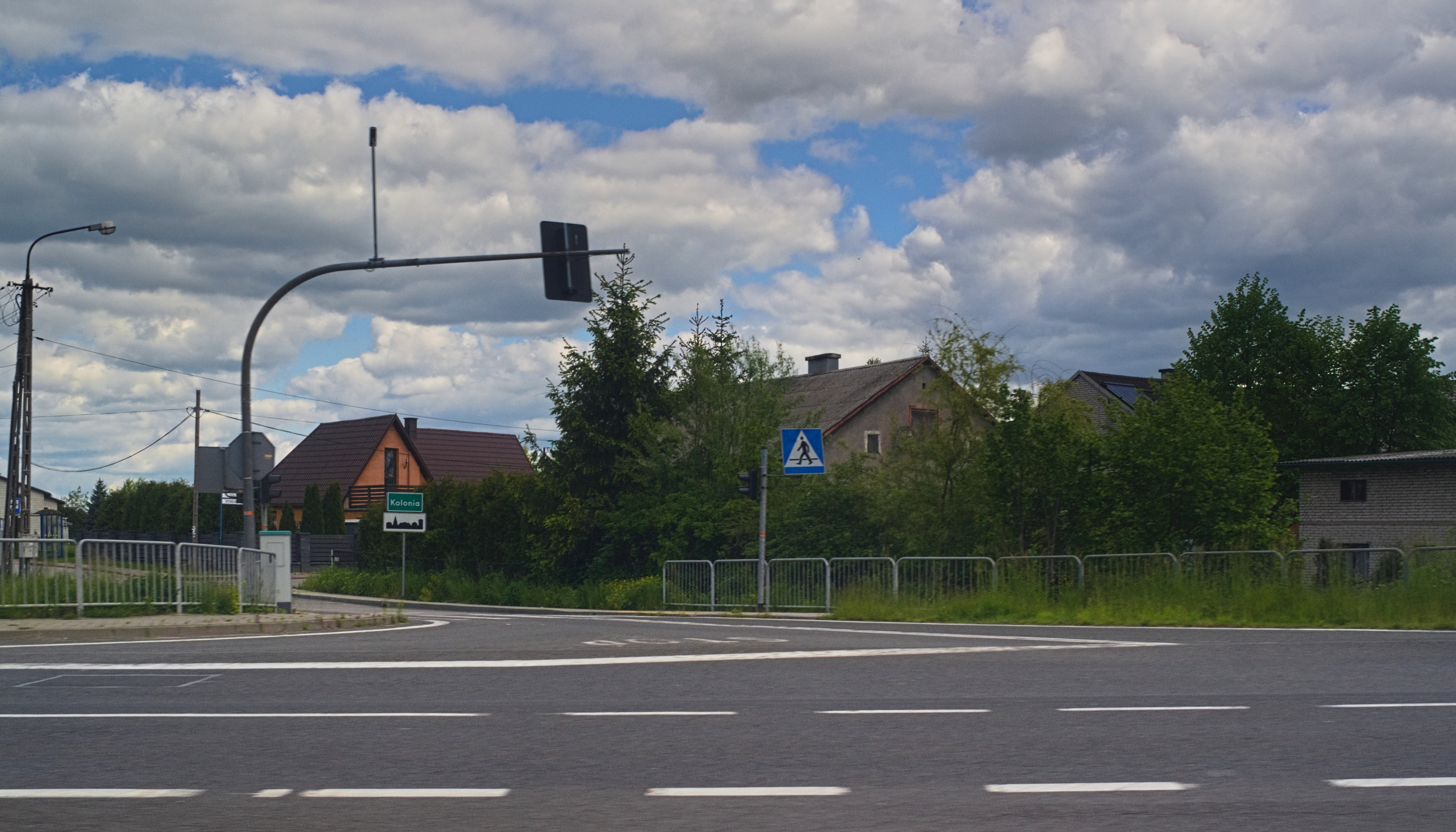
- Kolonia (2020)

- Location within Poland
- Coordinates: 50°18′40″N 19°26′26″E
- Country: Poland
- Voivodeship: Lesser Poland
- County: Olkusz
- Gmina: Bolesław

Ujków Nowy Kolonia [ˈui̯kuf ˈnɔvɨ kɔˈlɔɲa] is a village in the administrative district of Gmina Bolesław, within Olkusz County, Lesser Poland Voivodeship, in southern Poland.
