= Laski, Lesser Poland Voivodeship =

Laski
- Village
- Location within Poland
- Coordinates: 50°19′03″N 19°27′34″E
- Country: Poland
- Voivodeship: Lesser Poland
- County: Olkusz
- Gmina: Bolesław

Laski (Polish pronunciation: [ˈlaskʲi]) is a village in the administrative district of Gmina Bolesław, within Olkusz County, Lesser Poland Voivodeship, in southern Poland.
