= Krążek =

- Village
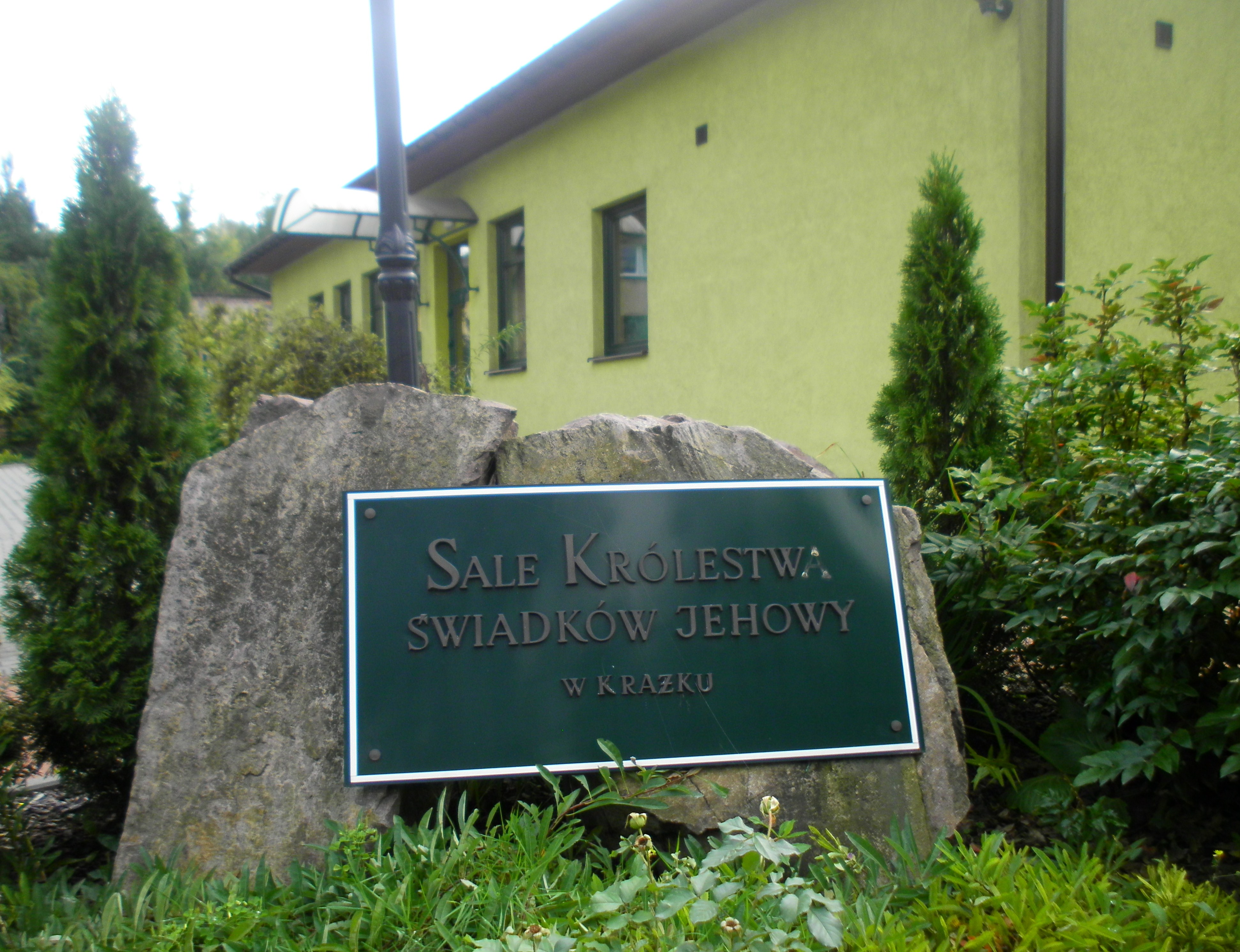

- Location within Poland
- Coordinates: 50°17′24″N 19°27′23″E
- Country: Poland
- Voivodeship: Lesser Poland
- County: Olkusz
- Gmina: Bolesław

Krążek [ˈkrɔ̃ʐɛk] is a village in the administrative district of Gmina Bolesław, within Olkusz County, Lesser Poland Voivodeship, in southern Poland.
