= Międzygórze, Lesser Poland Voivodeship =

Międzygórze
- Village
- Location within Poland
- Coordinates: 50°17′31″N 19°24′31″E
- Country: Poland
- Voivodeship: Lesser Poland
- County: Olkusz
- Gmina: Bolesław

Międzygórze [mjɛnd͡zɨˈɡuʐɛ] is a village in the administrative district of Gmina Bolesław, within Olkusz County, Lesser Poland Voivodeship, in southern Poland.
