= Ostrężnica =

- Village
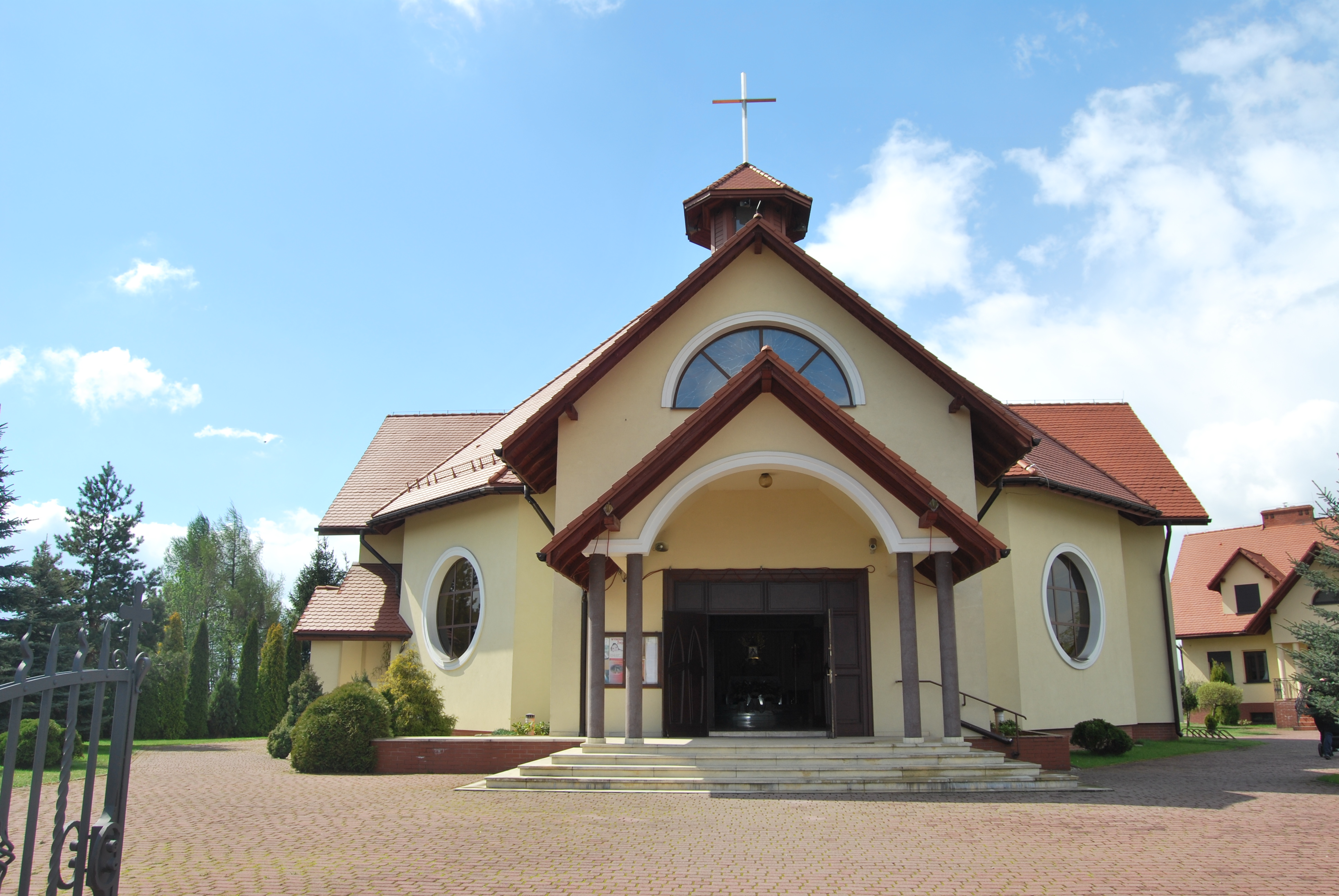
- Church of Saint Faustyna Kowalska

- Location within Poland
- Coordinates: 50°11′N 19°34′E
- Country: Poland
- Voivodeship: Lesser Poland
- County: Kraków
- Gmina: Krzeszowice

Population
  - Total: 1,065

Ostrężnica [ɔstrɛ̃ʐˈnit͡sa] is a village in the administrative district of Gmina Krzeszowice, within Kraków County, Lesser Poland Voivodeship, in southern Poland. The village is located in the historical region Galicia.
