= Garibaldi Legion (Poland) =

- Active: 1863
- Country: Poland, Congress Poland
- Engagements: Krzykawka

Commanders
- Notable commanders: Francesco Nullo

The Garibaldi Legion (or Garibaldians; Polish: Legion Garibaldczyków / Garibaldczycy; Italian: Legione Nullo / Garibaldini) was a small unit of Italian volunteers who fought for Polish independence in the January Uprising of 1863. The unit was named after the Italian revolutionary and nationalist Giuseppe Garibaldi, organized in Italy by his son Menotti Garibaldi and led by the general Francesco Nullo.

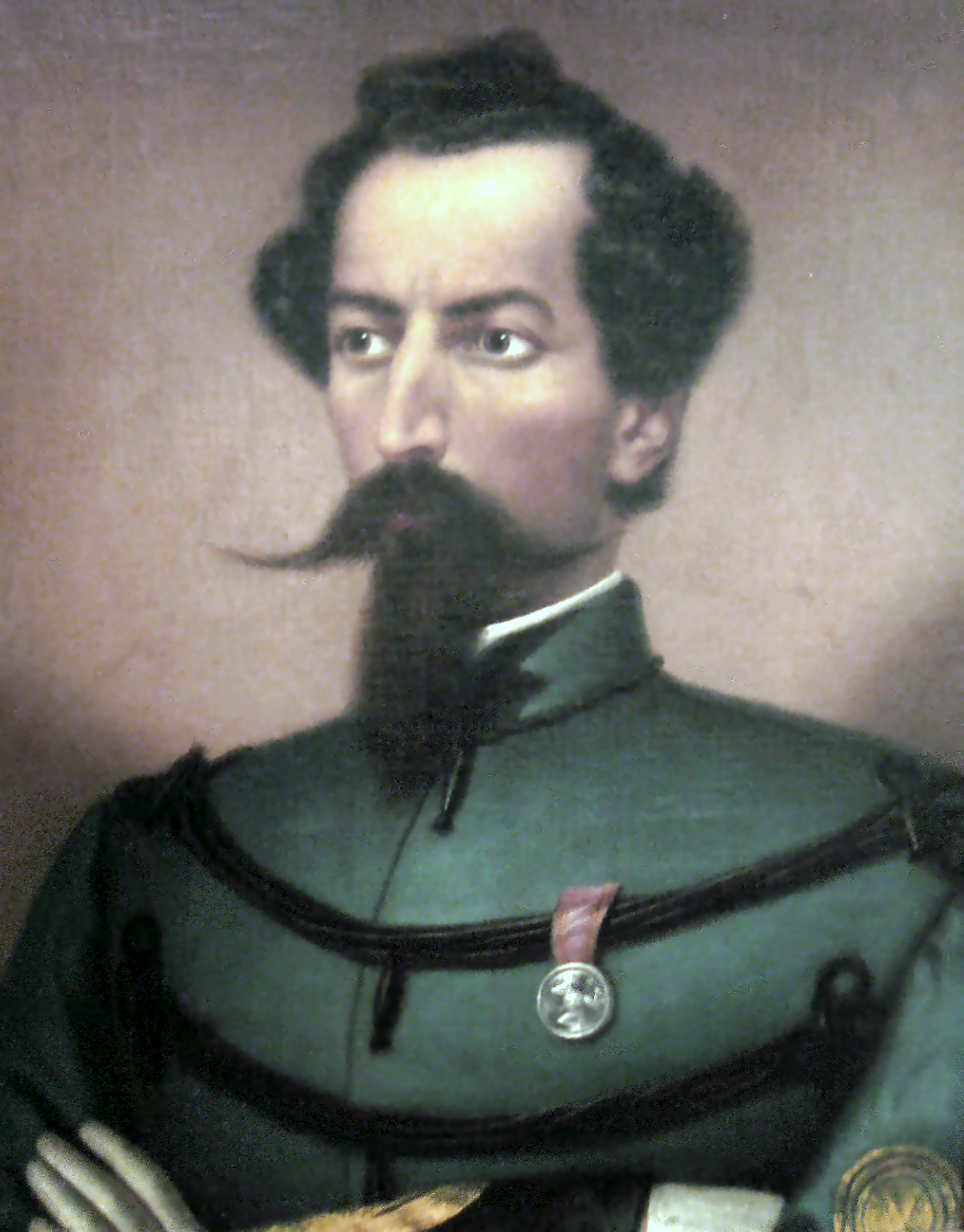
Francesco Nullo, general of the Garibaldi Legion

Nullo was a supporter of the Polish cause, and called for volunteers in his hometown of Bergamo. Having gathered a number of volunteers, he arrived in Kraków from Italy in April 1863. The Italians crossed the borders of Congress Poland on May the 3rd near Krzeszowice and joined a group of Polish insurgents led by colonel Józef Miniewski. That day the unit's first battle in Poland occurred at Podłęże where they defeated a Russian force. Subsequently, on May 5, the unit took part in the Battle of Krzykawka, where it suffered heavy casualties; Nullo was killed together with the Polish commander Miniewski; Nullo's adjutant Elia Marchetti was mortally wounded and died several days later. A number of Garibaldians were taken prisoner and deported to Siberia after the battle while others managed to escape the battlefield and returned to Italy.

Most sources estimate the strength of this unit to have been about twenty men.

While the military contribution of the Garibaldi's Legion was minimal, it was vividly remembered as a symbol of foreign support for the Poles and their cause. A number of streets, schools, and other monuments/locations in many cities in Poland are named in honor of Nullo or his unit.
