= Podłęże, Chrzanów County =

Podłęże
- Village
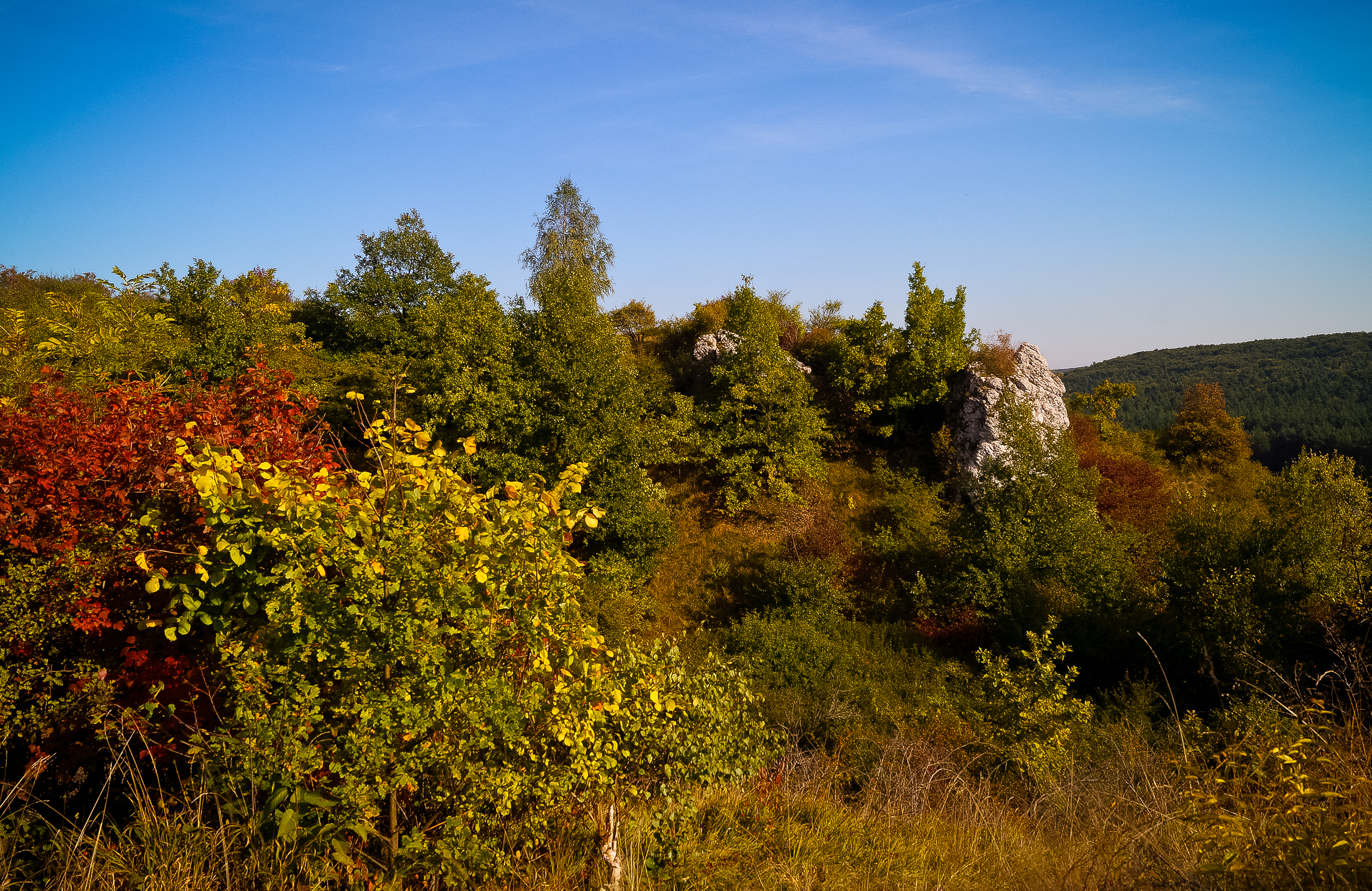

- Location within Poland
- Coordinates: 50°2′0″N 19°31′0″E
- Country: Poland
- Voivodeship: Lesser Poland
- County: Chrzanów
- Gmina: Alwernia
- Population: 253
- Time zone: UTC+1 (CET)
  - Summer (DST): UTC+2 (CEST)
- Vehicle registration: KCH

Podłęże [pɔdˈwɛ̃ʐɛ] is a village in the administrative district of Gmina Alwernia, within Chrzanów County, Lesser Poland Voivodeship, in southern Poland.
