= Lgota Wielka, Lesser Poland Voivodeship =

Lgota Wielka
- Village
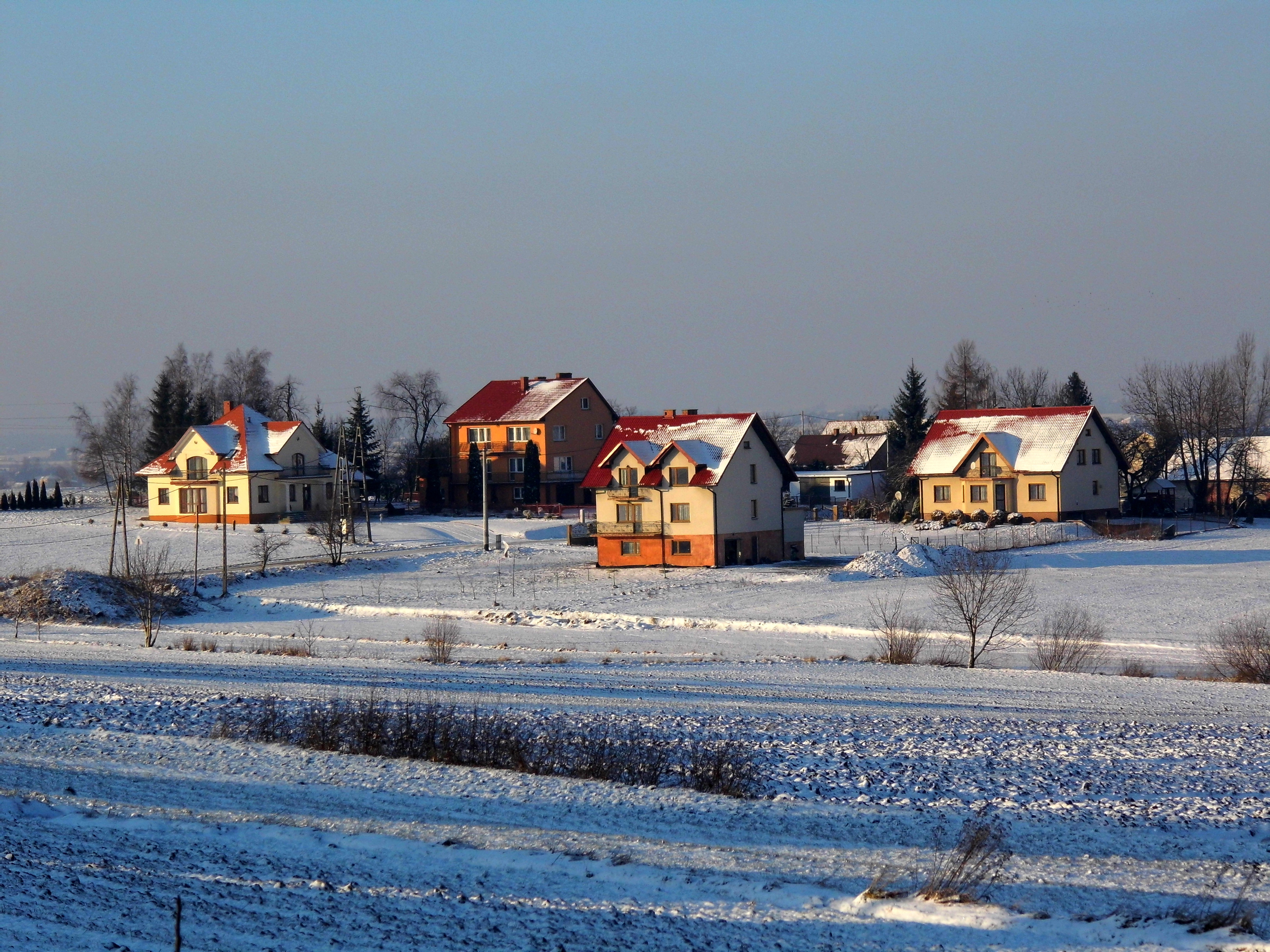
- View of Lgota Wielka

- Location within Poland
- Coordinates: 50°21′43″N 19°50′26″E
- Country: Poland
- Voivodeship: Lesser Poland
- County: Olkusz
- Gmina: Wolbrom

Lgota Wielka [ˈlɡɔta ˈvjɛlka] is a village in the administrative district of Gmina Wolbrom, within Olkusz County, Lesser Poland Voivodeship, in southern Poland.
