= Budzyń, Olkusz County =

Budzyń
- Village
- Location within Poland
- Coordinates: 50°20′50″N 19°49′6″E
- Country: Poland
- Voivodeship: Lesser Poland
- County: Olkusz
- Gmina: Wolbrom

Budzyń [ˈbud͡zɨɲ] is a village in the administrative district of Gmina Wolbrom, within Olkusz County, Lesser Poland Voivodeship, in southern Poland.
