= Kąpiołki =

- Village
- Location within Poland
- Coordinates: 50°26′N 19°43′E
- Country: Poland
- Voivodeship: Lesser Poland
- County: Olkusz
- Gmina: Wolbrom

Kąpiołki [kɔmˈpjɔu̯ki] is a village in the administrative district of Gmina Wolbrom, within Olkusz County, Lesser Poland Voivodeship, in southern Poland.
