= Kaliś =

- Village
- Location within Poland
- Coordinates: 50°22′16″N 19°43′06″E
- Country: Poland
- Voivodeship: Lesser Poland
- County: Olkusz
- Gmina: Wolbrom

Kaliś [ˈkaliɕ] is a village in the administrative district of Gmina Wolbrom, within Olkusz County, Lesser Poland Voivodeship, in southern Poland.
