= Nowa Łąka =

- Village
- Location within Poland
- Coordinates: 50°23′31″N 19°44′53″E
- Country: Poland
- Voivodeship: Lesser Poland
- County: Olkusz
- Gmina: Wolbrom

Nowa Łąka [ˈnɔva ˈwɔŋka] is a village in the administrative district of Gmina Wolbrom, within Olkusz County, Lesser Poland Voivodeship, in southern Poland.
