= Jeżówka, Lesser Poland Voivodeship =

Jeżówka
- Village
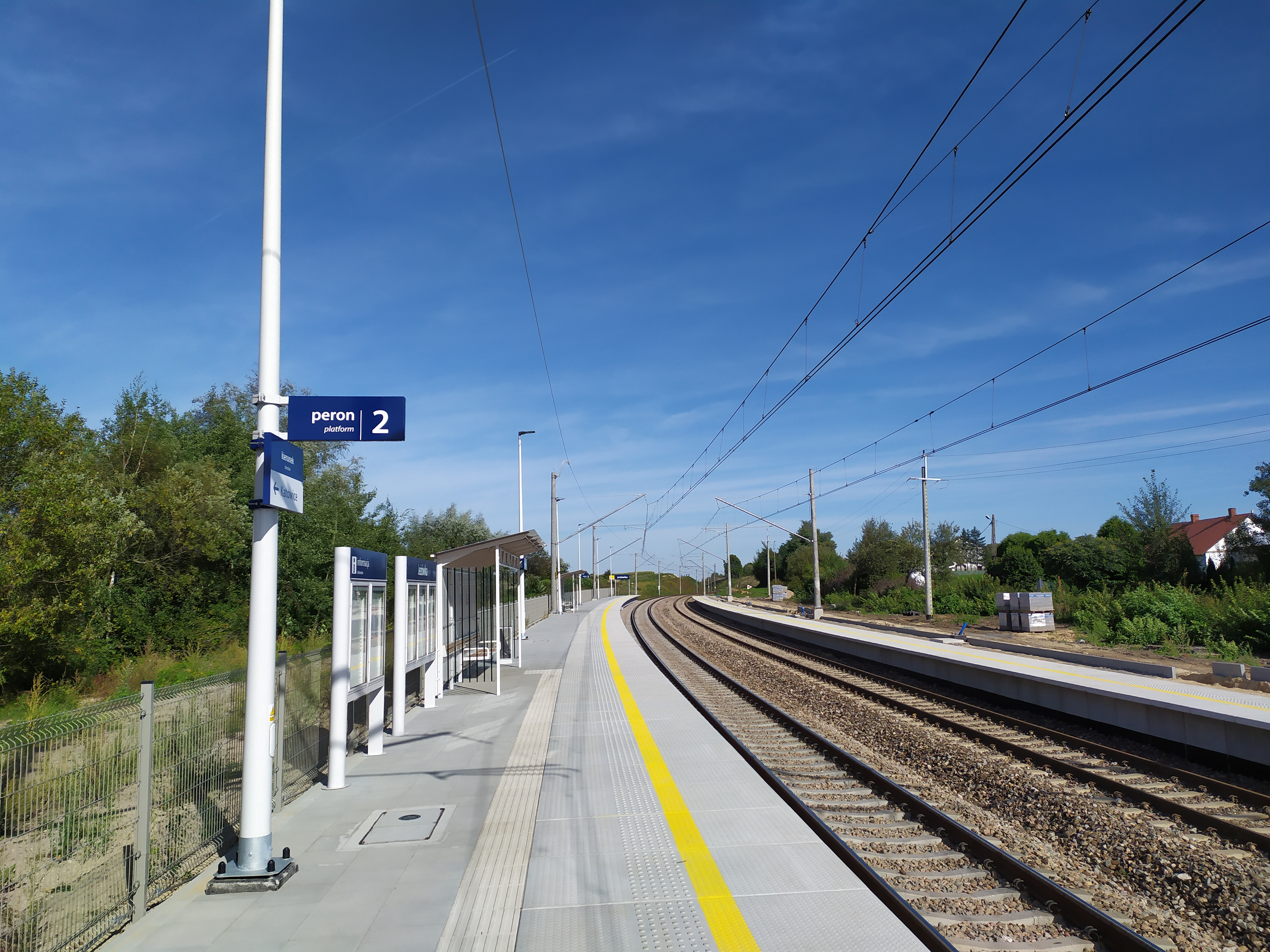
- Railway station

- Location within Poland
- Coordinates: 50°25′15″N 19°49′41″E
- Country: Poland
- Voivodeship: Lesser Poland
- County: Olkusz
- Gmina: Wolbrom

Jeżówka [jɛˈʐufka] is a village in the administrative district of Gmina Wolbrom, within Olkusz County, Lesser Poland Voivodeship, in southern Poland.
