= Miechówka =

- Village
- Location within Poland
- Coordinates: 50°25′23″N 19°45′13″E
- Country: Poland
- Voivodeship: Lesser Poland
- County: Olkusz
- Gmina: Wolbrom

Miechówka [mjɛˈxufka] is a village in the administrative district of Gmina Wolbrom, within Olkusz County, Lesser Poland Voivodeship, in southern Poland.
