= Załęże, Lesser Poland Voivodeship =

Załęże
- Village
- Location within Poland
- Coordinates: 50°24′N 19°40′E
- Country: Poland
- Voivodeship: Lesser Poland
- County: Olkusz
- Gmina: Wolbrom

Załęże [zaˈwɛ̃ʐɛ] is a village in the administrative district of Gmina Wolbrom, within Olkusz County, Lesser Poland Voivodeship, in southern Poland.
