= Poręba Dzierżna =

- Village
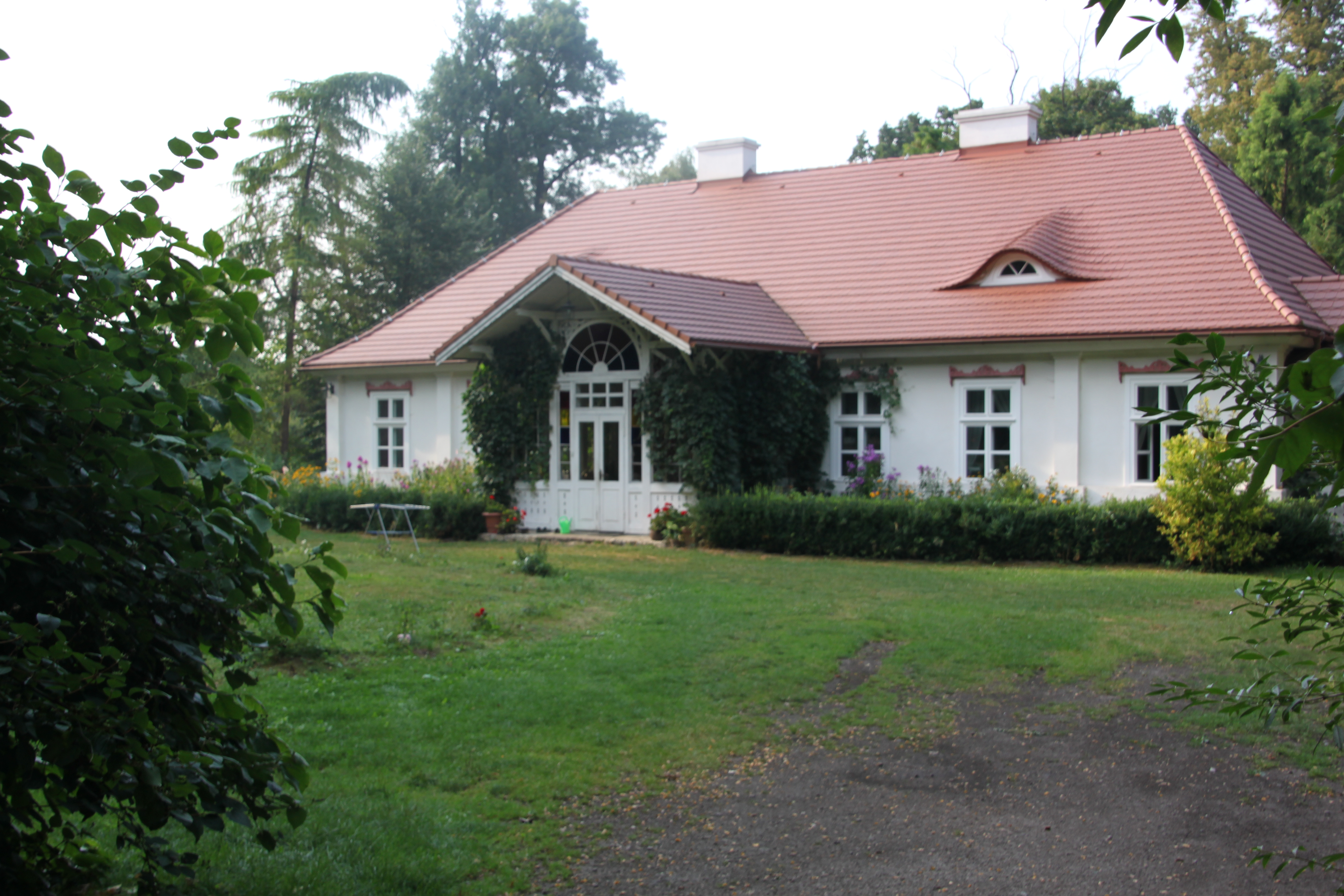
- Manor house

- Location within Poland
- Coordinates: 50°26′N 19°47′E
- Country: Poland
- Voivodeship: Lesser Poland
- County: Olkusz
- Gmina: Wolbrom

Poręba Dzierżna [pɔˈrɛmba ˈd͡ʑɛrʐna] is a village in the administrative district of Gmina Wolbrom, within Olkusz County, Lesser Poland Voivodeship, in southern Poland.
