= Wymysłów, Olkusz County =

Wymysłów
- Village
- Location within Poland
- Coordinates: 50°23′53″N 19°45′59″E
- Country: Poland
- Voivodeship: Lesser Poland
- County: Olkusz
- Gmina: Wolbrom

Wymysłów [vɨˈmɨswuf] is a village in the administrative district of Gmina Wolbrom, within Olkusz County, Lesser Poland Voivodeship, in southern Poland.
