= Boża Wola, Lesser Poland Voivodeship =

Boża Wola
- Village
- Location within Poland
- Coordinates: 50°25′N 19°48′E
- Country: Poland
- Voivodeship: Lesser Poland
- County: Olkusz
- Gmina: Wolbrom

Boża Wola [ˈbɔʐa ˈvɔla] is a village in the administrative district of Gmina Wolbrom, within Olkusz County, Lesser Poland Voivodeship, in southern Poland.
