= Dłużec =

Dłużec may refer to the following places in Poland:

- Dłużec, Lower Silesian Voivodeship (south-west Poland)
- Dłużec, Lesser Poland Voivodeship (south Poland)
- Dłużec, Mrągowo County in Warmian-Masurian Voivodeship (north Poland)
- Dłużec, Węgorzewo County in Warmian-Masurian Voivodeship (north Poland)
