= Kąpiele Wielkie =

- Village
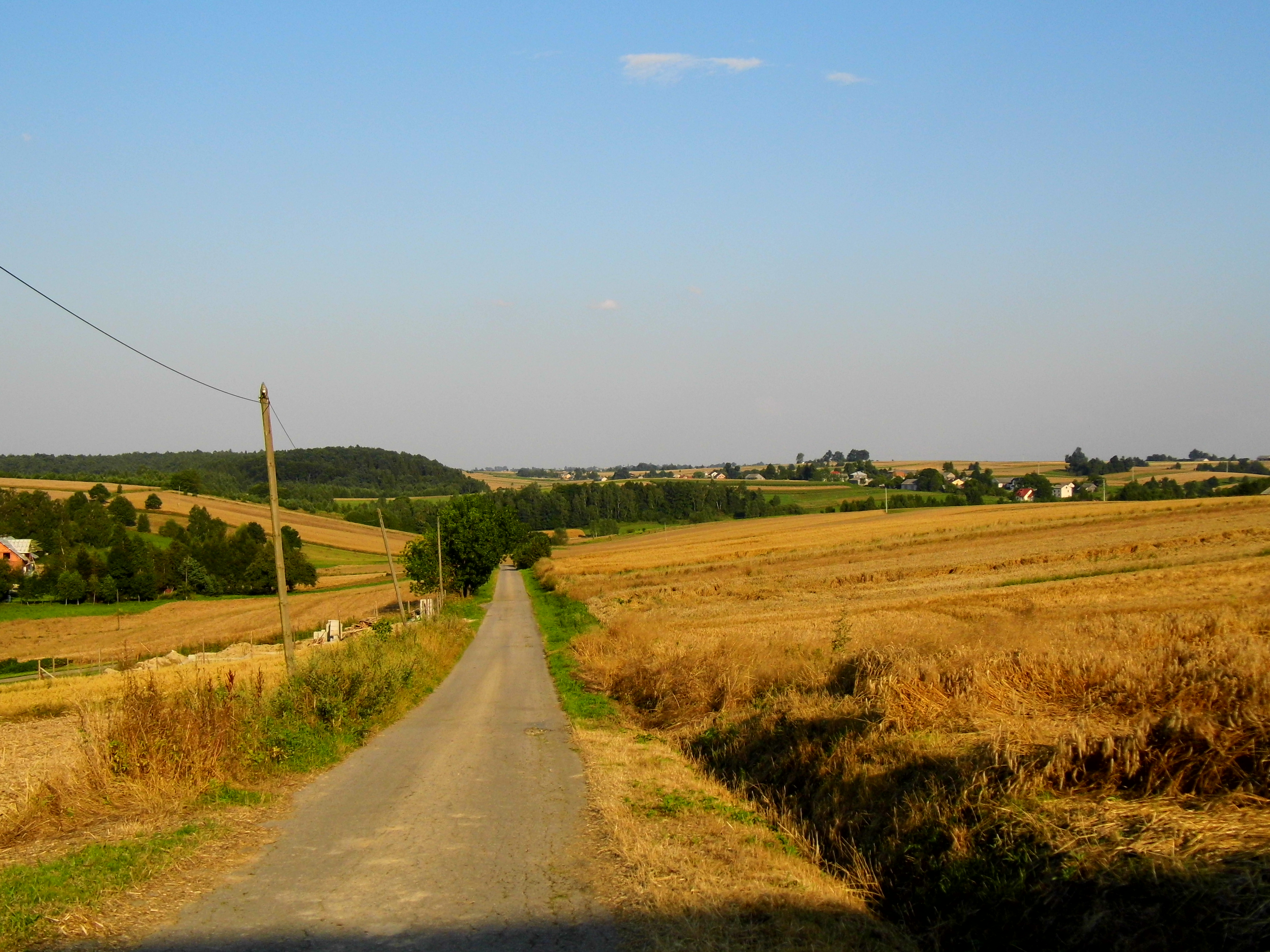

- Location within Poland
- Coordinates: 50°26′N 19°44′E
- Country: Poland
- Voivodeship: Lesser Poland
- County: Olkusz
- Gmina: Wolbrom

Kąpiele Wielkie [kɔmˈpjɛlɛ ˈvjɛlkʲɛ] is a village in the administrative district of Gmina Wolbrom, within Olkusz County, Lesser Poland Voivodeship, in southern Poland.
