= Klemens Janicki =

Polish writer (1516–1543)

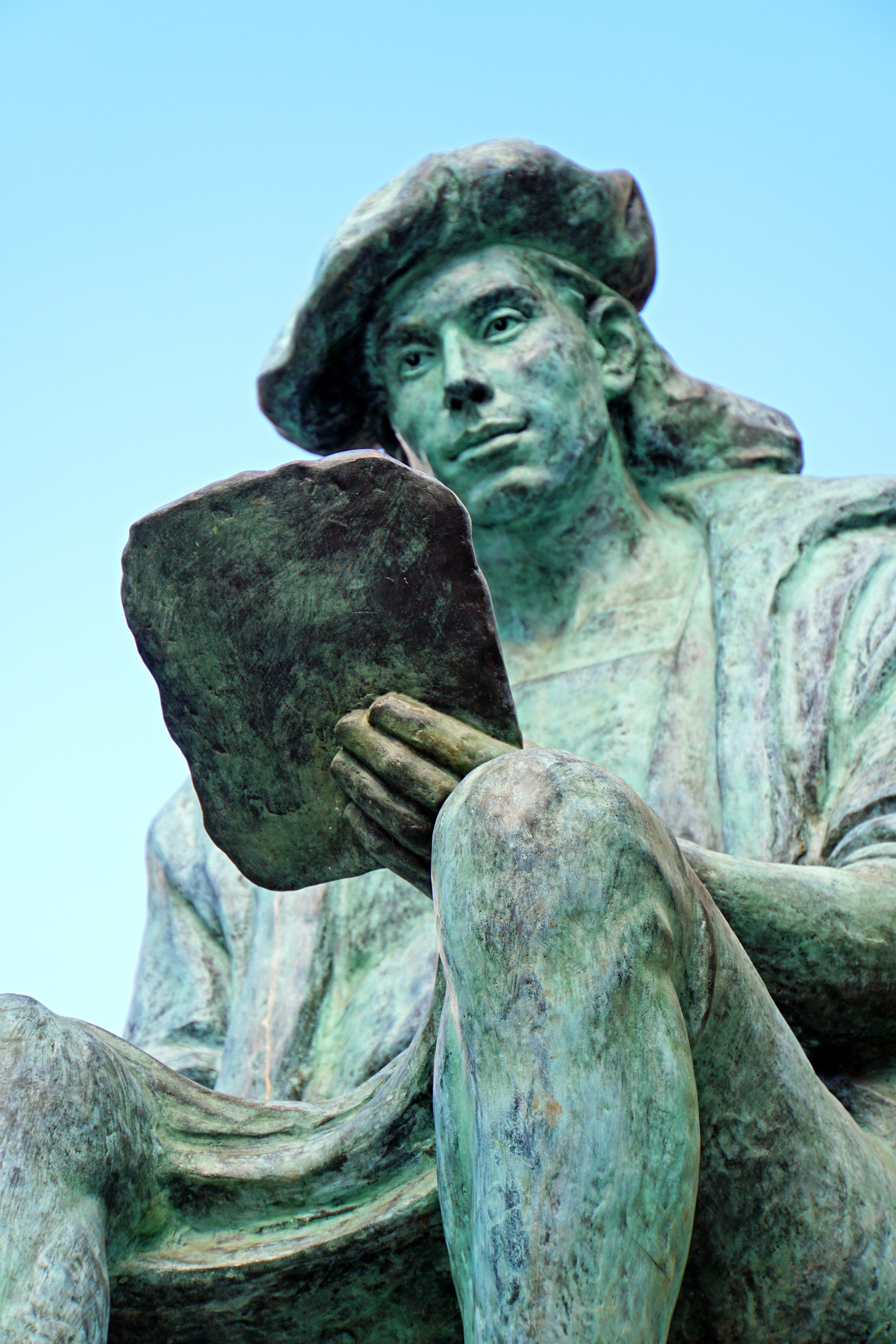
Statue of Klemens Janicki (Ianicius) in Poznań

Klemens Janicki (1516–1543), also known as Clemens Ianicius, was a Polish writer and one of the most outstanding 16th-century poets in Latin.

== Biography ==
Janicki was born in Januszkowo, a village near Żnin, Poland, to a peasant family. He first went to an elementary school in Żnin, then to the Lubrański Academy in Poznań where he studied Greek, Latin and Ancient literature.

In 1536, he became secretary to Gniezno archbishop Andrzej Krzycki, and met such scholars as Jan Dantyszek (Latin: Johannes Dantiscus), Stanisław Hozjusz (Latin: Stanislaus Hosius). At that time he wrote several elegies such as Ad Andream Cricium, De Cricio Cracovia eunte, and Vitae archaepiscoporum Gnesnensium for his patron. After Archbishop Krzycki died, Janicki worked under patronage of Count Piotr Kmita and wrote Querella Reipublicae Regni Poloniae i Ad Polonos proceras. In 1538 Count Sobieński sponsored his studies in Padua, where he met Piotr Myszkowski, Filip Padniewski and Andrzej Zebrzydowski. On 22 July 1540, he graduated in philosophy with the designation of doctor. Pope Paul III awarded him the title of poeta laureatus.

During his travel to Italy, he fell ill with edema and soon returned to Poland. Not wanting to work for Count Kmita, he devoted himself to work as a parson in Gołaczewy near Olkusz. In 1541 he wrote a collection of elegies titled "Tristium liber" in which he foresaw his death, especially Elegy VII De se ipso ad posteritatem (About myself to posterity). Janicki died in January 1543; his last work, Epithalamium Serenissimo Regi Poloniae, Sigismundo Augusto, was found by his heirs Jan Antonin and Augustinus Rotundus who decided to publish it.

Janicki, a humanist and an expert on the classics, mastered his poetic technique at the highest possible level. At the same time, however, he approached the topics originally, which is clearly seen in the fragments dedicated to his native nature, the past and the present of Poland. The personal tone of his poetry was a new element in Polish poetry. He was the first poet to write so much about himself and his relatives, about the dignity and pride of the poet.

== Works ==
Janicki was above all a writer of lyric verse, which can be proved by the contents of the 1542 volume. Inspired by Ovid, he created elegies developing personal motifs, sometimes giving topographical and personal details. Among these poems there is an autobiographical elegy De se ipso ad posteritatem ("On Myself for Posterity"), which is sometimes seen as a paraphrase of one of the elegies of the Roman master (Tristia IV, 10). With the title of his collection of poems Tristium Liber, the poet clearly refers to Ovid's elegies written in exile, Tristia.

Apart from elegies, epigrams were the most common genre in the poet's writing. Janicjusz expressed himself in various kinds of this genre: epitaphs, stemmata (poems on coats of arms) and in imagery poems similar to emblematic compositions. Using the examples of Martial, Propertius and Catullus, he undertook various erotic, laudatory, humorous and satirical motifs. There are two series of his epigrams: Vitae archiepiscoporum Gnesnensium and Vitae regum Polonorum. The first consists of 43 poems presenting the lives of the Gniezno archbishops, and was created owing to archbishop Krzycki. The characteristics of the clerical dignitaries are generally positive, however, there is some criticism or humorous overtones. The second series consists of 44 biograms of legendary (starting with Lech I) and historic rulers of Poland (starting with Mieszko I), this collection was initiated by Kmita.

Querela Reipublicae Regni Poloniae is of a completely different character. Poem, which refers to the events of the nobles' rebellion known as the Chicken War, through the words of personified Poland, the artist complains about the nobility, magnates especially, their internal quarrels and their private interests.

A wedding song, Epithalamium Serenissimo Regi Poloniae, Sigismundo Augusto, written for the planned marriage of King Zygmunt August and Elżbieta, a daughter of Ferdinand I, Holy Roman Emperor who was then King of the Bohemia and of Hungary, was the last work of Janicjusz. It contains two poems comprising over 500 verses as a whole. The first one, addressed to the King Zygmunt I the Old, was invented as a praise of the monarch and his military achievements among other things. The second, is a true wedding song and sings the praises of the bride and the groom.

== Bibliography ==
- Querela Reipublicae Regni Poloniae ("A Complaint of the Kingdom of Poland") 1538
- Tristium Liber I – X ("Sorrows", Book I) 1542
  - (in English) Elegy VII About myself to posterity
- Variarum elegiarum liber I ("Various Elegies", Book I) 1542
- Epigrammatum liber I ("Epigrams", Book I) 1542
- Epithalamium Serenissimo Regi Poloniae, Sigismundo Augusto ("A Wedding Song for the Polish King Zygmunt August") Antwerp 1563
- Vitae regum Polonorum Antwerp 1563
- In Polonici vestitus varietatem et inconstantiam dialogus ("A Dialogue Against the Diversity and Changeability of Polish Dress") Antwerp 1563
- Vitae archiepiscoporum Gnesnensium ("The Lives of Gniezno Archbishops") Kraków 1574

== See also ==
- Polish Literature
- Polish history
- List of Poles
