= Podlesice Drugie =

- Village
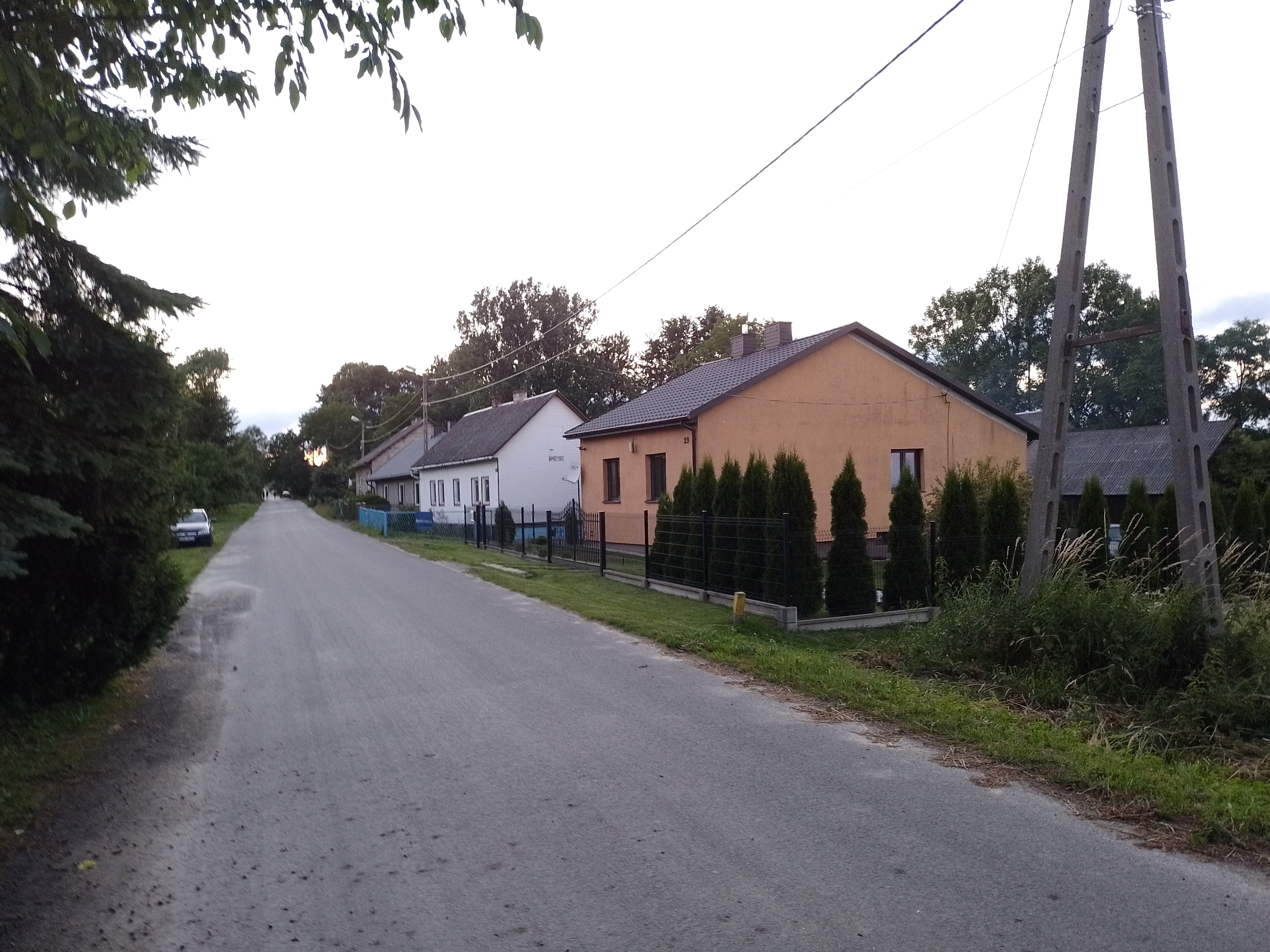

- Location within Poland
- Coordinates: 50°23′41″N 19°50′15″E
- Country: Poland
- Voivodeship: Lesser Poland
- County: Olkusz
- Gmina: Wolbrom

Podlesice Drugie [pɔdlɛˈɕit͡sɛ ˈdruɡʲɛ] is a village in the administrative district of Gmina Wolbrom, within Olkusz County, Lesser Poland Voivodeship, in southern Poland.
