= Lgota Wolbromska =

- Village
- Location within Poland
- Coordinates: 50°22′51″N 19°42′19″E
- Country: Poland
- Voivodeship: Lesser Poland
- County: Olkusz
- Gmina: Wolbrom
- Population: 410

Lgota Wolbromska [ˈlɡɔta vɔlˈbrɔmska] is a village in the administrative district of Gmina Wolbrom, within Olkusz County, Lesser Poland Voivodeship, in southern Poland.
