= Okupniki, Lesser Poland Voivodeship =

Okupniki
- Village
- Location within Poland
- Coordinates: 50°24′57.3″N 19°42′05.3″E
- Country: Poland
- Voivodeship: Lesser Poland
- County: Olkusz
- Gmina: Wolbrom

Okupniki [ɔkupˈniki] is a village in the administrative district of Gmina Wolbrom, within Olkusz County, Lesser Poland Voivodeship, in southern Poland.
