= Zabagnie, Lesser Poland Voivodeship =

Zabagnie
- Village
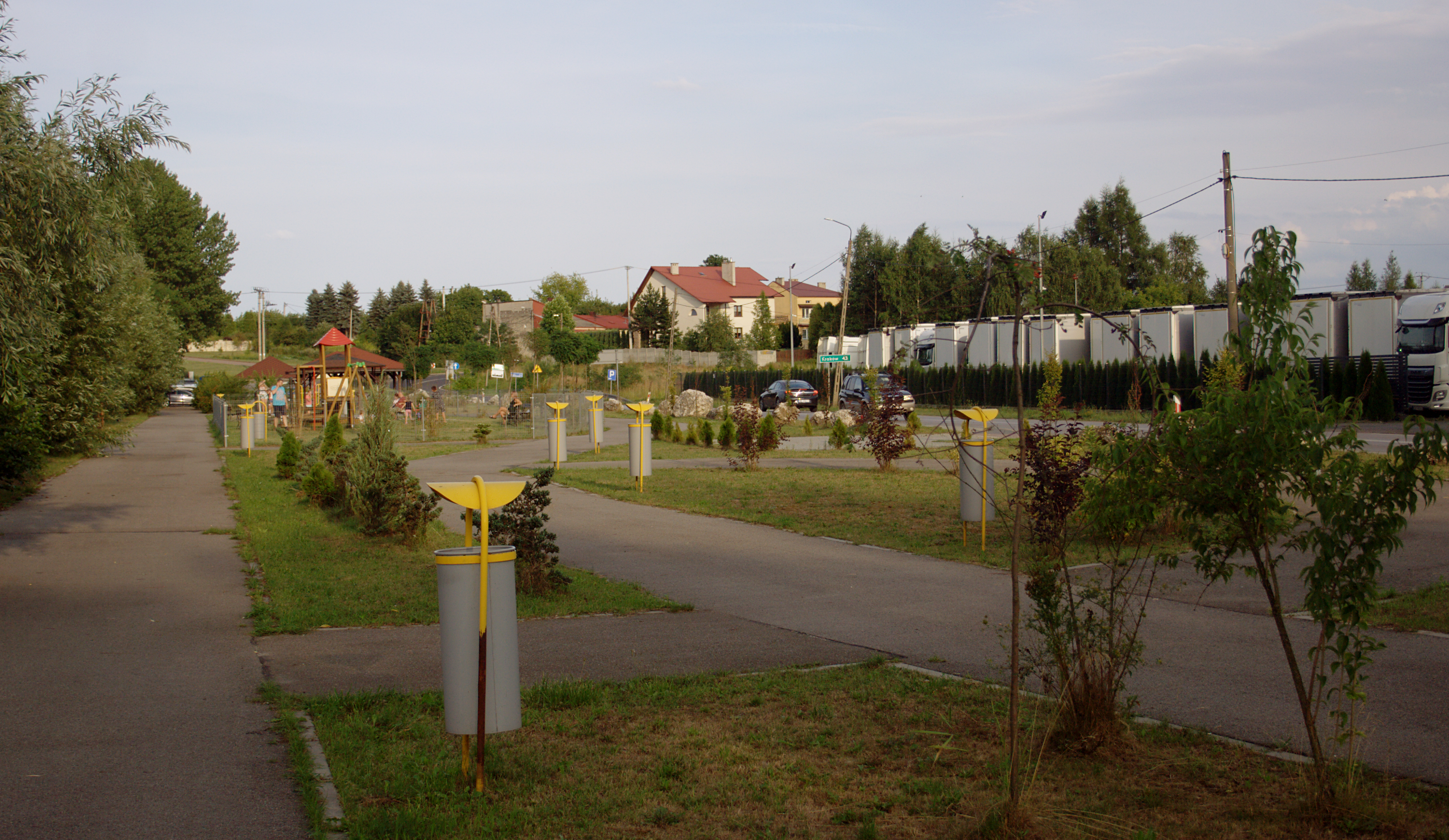

- Location within Poland
- Coordinates: 50°24′8″N 19°44′29″E
- Country: Poland
- Voivodeship: Lesser Poland
- County: Olkusz
- Gmina: Wolbrom

Zabagnie [zaˈbaɡɲɛ] is a village in the administrative district of Gmina Wolbrom, within Olkusz County, Lesser Poland Voivodeship, in southern Poland.
