= Poręba Górna =

- Village
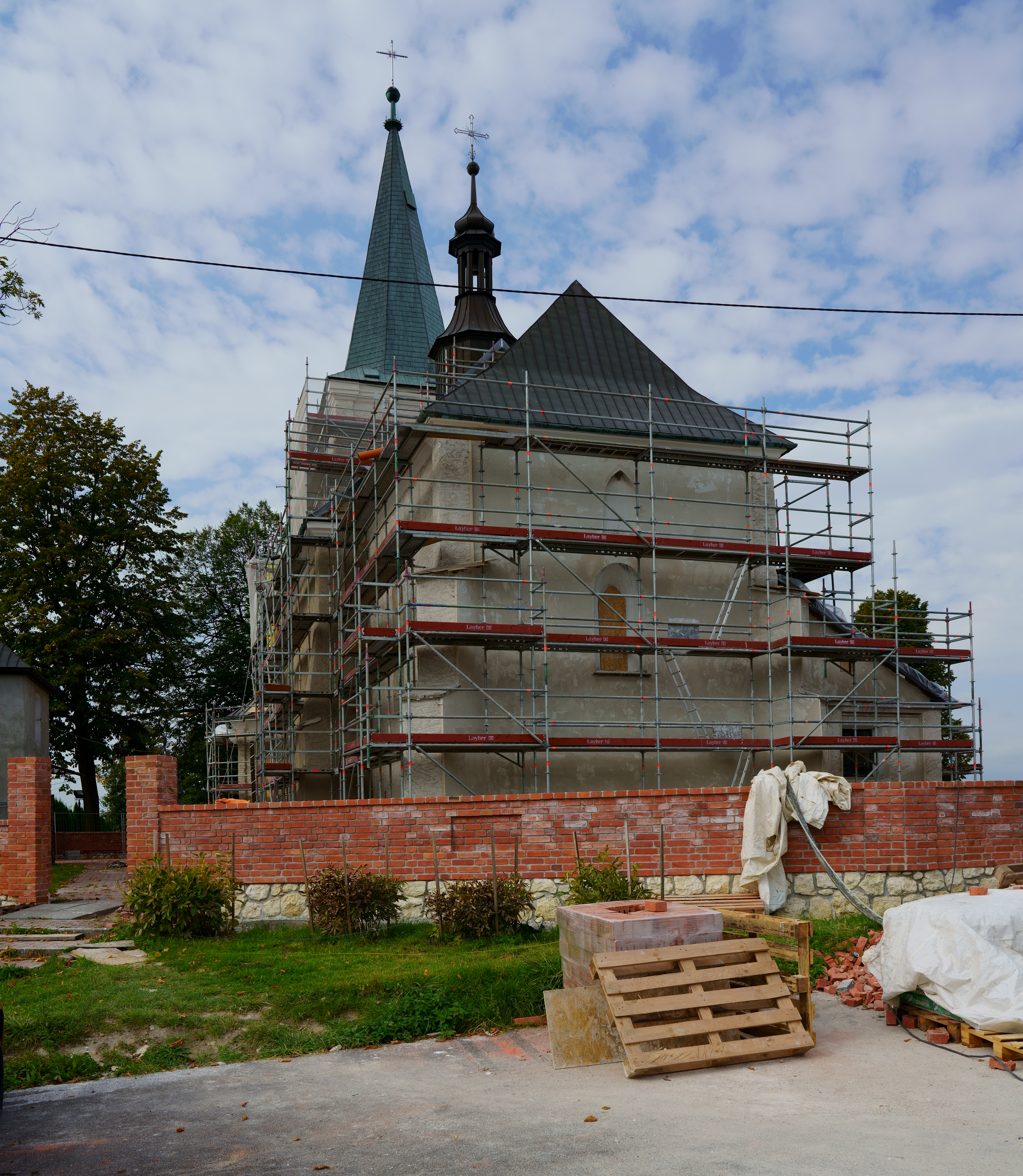
- Catholic church

- Location within Poland
- Coordinates: 50°21′N 19°48′E
- Country: Poland
- Voivodeship: Lesser Poland
- County: Olkusz
- Gmina: Wolbrom

Poręba Górna [pɔˈrɛmba ˈɡurna] is a village in the administrative district of Gmina Wolbrom, within Olkusz County, Lesser Poland Voivodeship, in southern Poland.
