= Strzegowa, Lesser Poland Voivodeship =

Strzegowa
- Village
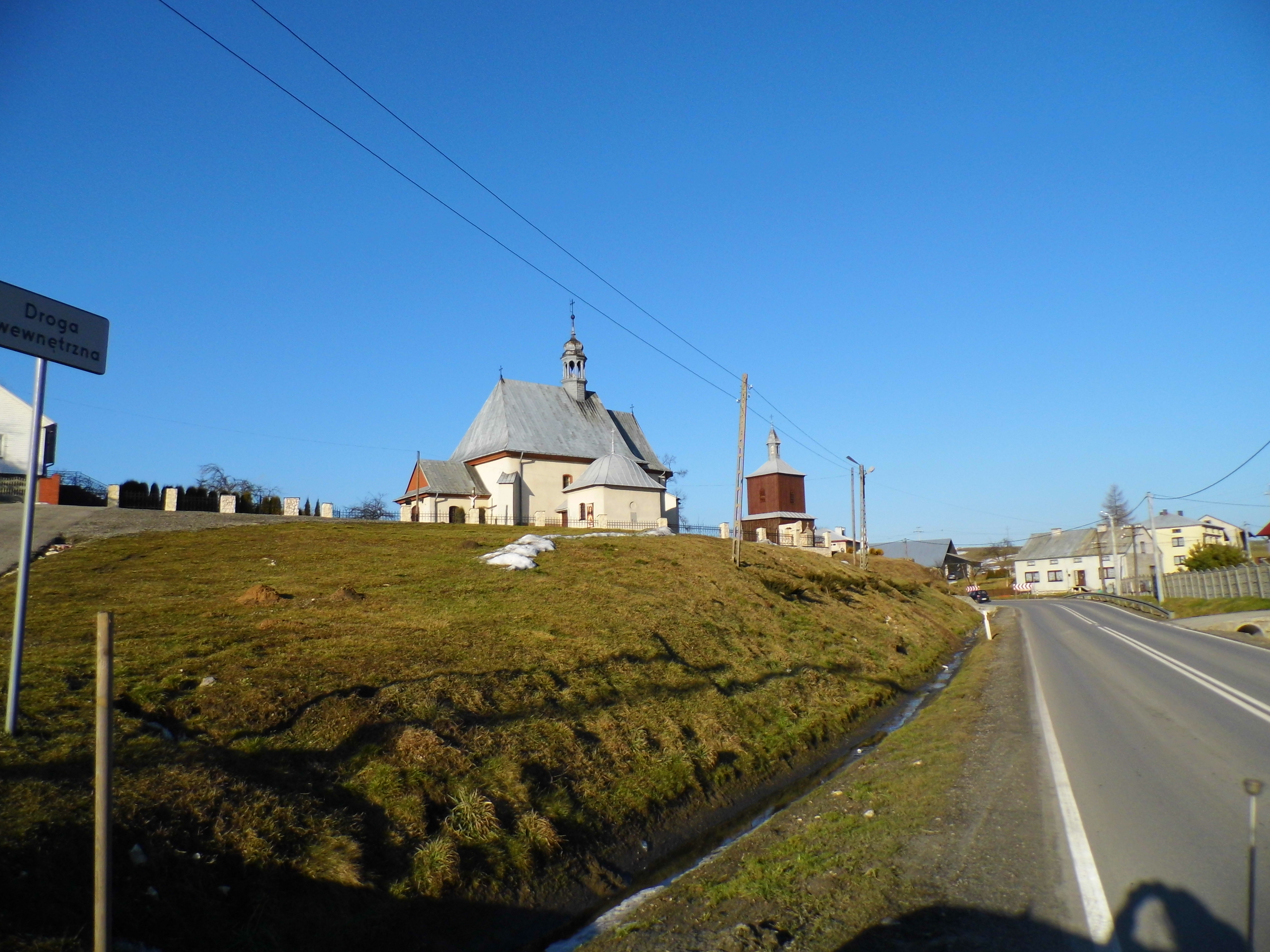

- Location within Poland
- Coordinates: 50°25′50″N 19°41′56″E
- Country: Poland
- Voivodeship: Lesser Poland
- County: Olkusz
- Gmina: Wolbrom

Strzegowa [stʂɛˈɡɔva] is a village in the administrative district of Gmina Wolbrom, within Olkusz County, Lesser Poland Voivodeship, in southern Poland.
