= Chrząstowice =

Chrząstowice may refer to the following places:

- Chrząstowice, Olkusz County in Lesser Poland Voivodeship (south Poland)
- Chrząstowice, Wadowice County in Lesser Poland Voivodeship (south Poland)
- Chrząstowice, Opole Voivodeship (south-west Poland)
