= Zarzecze, Olkusz County =

Zarzecze
- Village
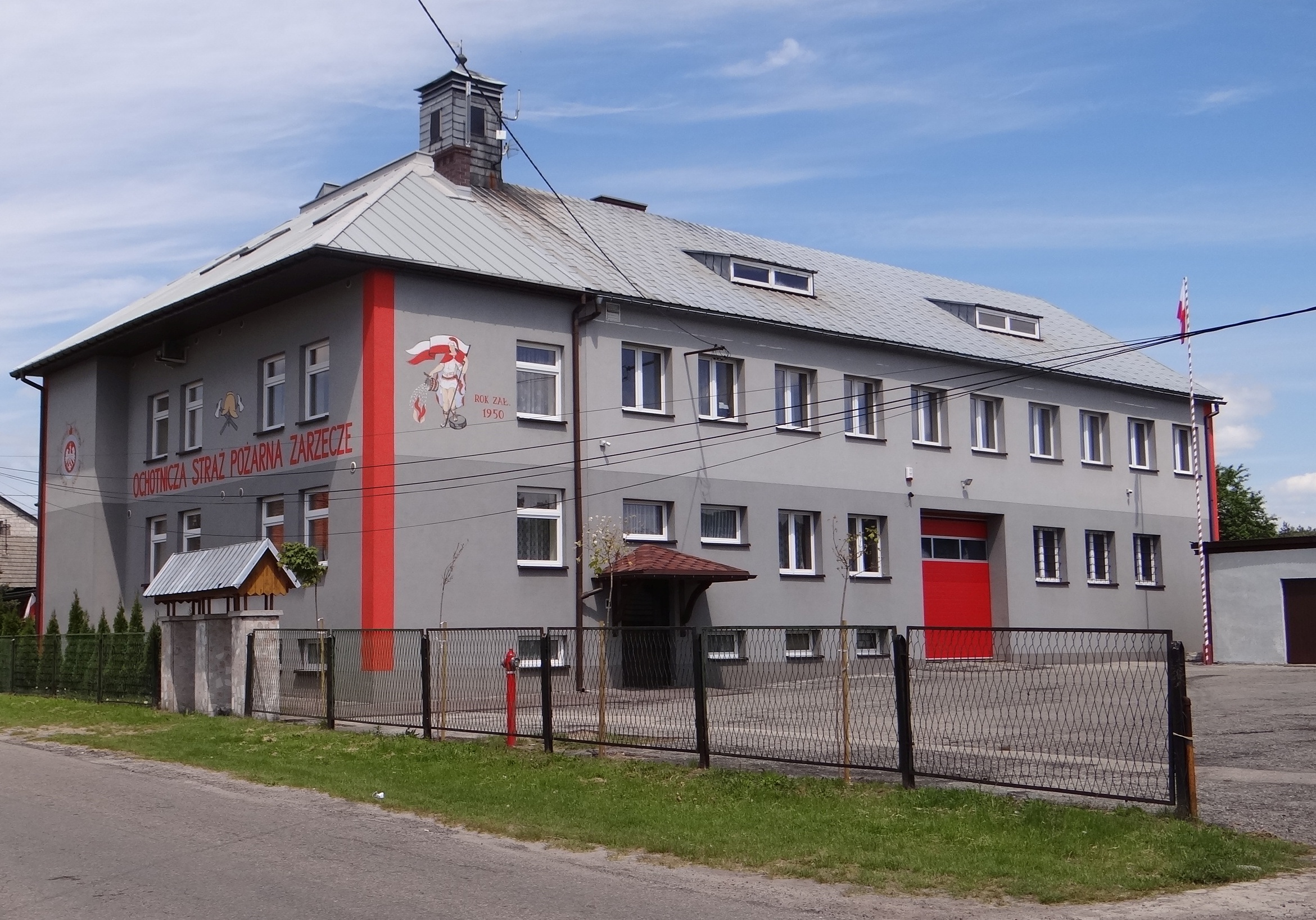
- Fire station

- Location within Poland
- Coordinates: 50°22′N 19°42′E
- Country: Poland
- Voivodeship: Lesser Poland
- County: Olkusz
- Gmina: Wolbrom
- Population: 1,200

Zarzecze [zaˈʐɛt͡ʂɛ] is a village in the administrative district of Gmina Wolbrom, within Olkusz County, Lesser Poland Voivodeship, in southern Poland.
