= Sulisławice =

Sulisławice may refer to the following places in Poland:

- Sulisławice, Świdnica County in Lower Silesian Voivodeship (south-west Poland)
- Sulisławice, Trzebnica County in Lower Silesian Voivodeship (south-west Poland)
- Sulisławice, Ząbkowice County in Lower Silesian Voivodeship (south-west Poland)
- Sulisławice, Lesser Poland Voivodeship (south Poland)
- Sulisławice, Świętokrzyskie Voivodeship (south-central Poland)
