= Chełm, Olkusz County =

Chełm
- Village
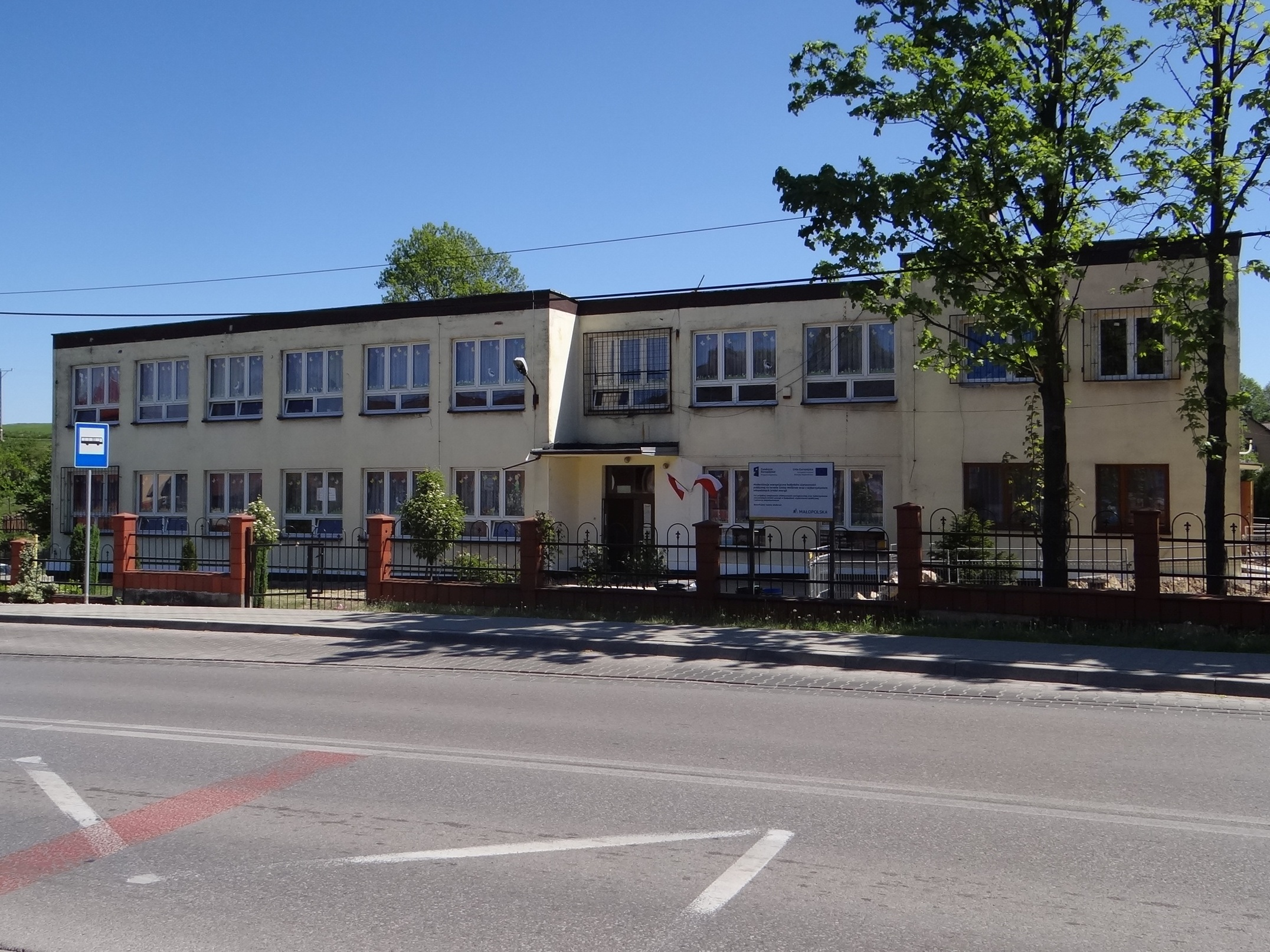
- Primary school in Chełm

- Location within Poland
- Coordinates: 50°21′33″N 19°45′16″E
- Country: Poland
- Voivodeship: Lesser Poland
- County: Olkusz
- Gmina: Wolbrom
- Population: 892
- Time zone: UTC+1 (CET)
  - Summer (DST): UTC+2 (CEST)
- Vehicle registration: KOL

Chełm (Polish pronunciation: [xɛwm]) is a village in the administrative district of Gmina Wolbrom, within Olkusz County, Lesser Poland Voivodeship, in southern Poland.
