= Gmina Wolbrom =

Gmina Wolbrom Wolbrom Commune
- Gmina
- Coat of arms
- Interactive map of Gmina Wolbrom
- Coordinates (Wolbrom): 50°24′N 19°46′E
- Country: Poland
- Voivodeship: Lesser Poland
- County: Olkusz
- Seat: Wolbrom

Area
  - Total: 150.82 km^{2} (58.23 sq mi)

Population (2006)
  - Total: 23,454
  - Density: 155.51/km^{2} (402.77/sq mi)
  - Urban: 9,075
  - Rural: 14,379
- Website: http://www.umigwolbrom.pl

Gmina Wolbrom (German: Wolfram) is an urban-rural gmina (administrative district) in Olkusz County, Lesser Poland Voivodeship, in southern Poland. Its seat is the town of Wolbrom, which lies approximately 20 kilometres (12 mi) north-east of Olkusz and 40 km (25 mi) north of the regional capital Kraków.

The gmina covers an area of 150.82 square kilometres (58.2 sq mi), and as of 2006 its total population is 23,454 (out of which the population of Wolbrom amounts to 9,075, and the population of the rural part of the gmina is 14,379).

== Villages ==
Apart from the town of Wolbrom, Gmina Wolbrom contains the villages and settlements of Boża Wola, Brzozówka, Budzyń, Chełm, Chrząstowice, Dłużec, Domaniewice, Gołaczewy, Jeżówka, Kaliś, Kąpiele Wielkie, Kąpiołki, Lgota Wielka, Lgota Wolbromska, Łobzów, Miechówka, Nowa Łąka, Okupniki, Podlesice Drugie, Poręba Dzierżna, Poręba Górna, Strzegowa, Sulisławice, Wierzchowisko, Wymysłów, Zabagnie, Załęże, Zarzecze and Zasępiec.

== Neighbouring gminas ==
Gmina Wolbrom is bordered by the gminas of Charsznica, Gołcza, Klucze, Olkusz, Pilica, Trzyciąż and Żarnowiec.
