= Gołaczewy =

- Village
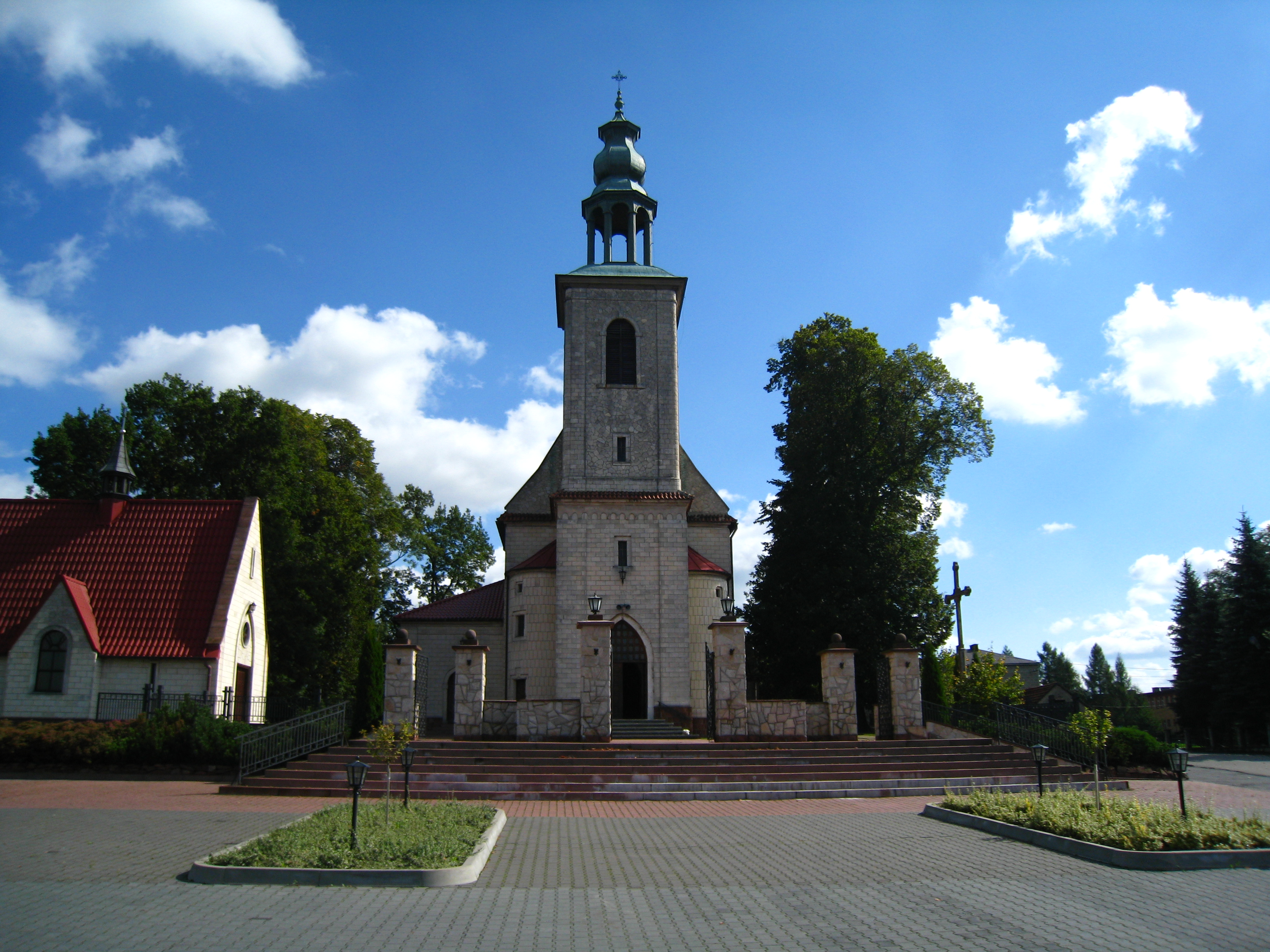
- Catholic church

- Location within Poland
- Coordinates: 50°22′N 19°43′E
- Country: Poland
- Voivodeship: Lesser Poland
- County: Olkusz
- Gmina: Wolbrom
- Population: 1,400

Gołaczewy [ɡɔwaˈt͡ʂɛvɨ] is a village in the administrative district of Gmina Wolbrom, within Olkusz County, Lesser Poland Voivodeship, in southern Poland.
