= Sulisławice, Lesser Poland Voivodeship =

Sulisławice
- Village
- Location within Poland
- Coordinates: 50°22′45″N 19°50′25″E
- Country: Poland
- Voivodeship: Lesser Poland
- County: Olkusz
- Gmina: Wolbrom

Sulisławice [suliswaˈvit͡sɛ] is a village in the administrative district of Gmina Wolbrom, within Olkusz County, Lesser Poland Voivodeship, in southern Poland.
