= Chrząstowice, Olkusz County =

Chrząstowice
- Village
- Location within Poland
- Coordinates: 50°20′N 19°41′E
- Country: Poland
- Voivodeship: Lesser Poland
- County: Olkusz
- Gmina: Wolbrom

Chrząstowice [xʂɔ̃stɔˈvit͡sɛ] is a village in the administrative district of Gmina Wolbrom, within Olkusz County, Lesser Poland Voivodeship, in southern Poland.
