= Bukowno =

Town in Lesser Poland Voivodeship, Poland

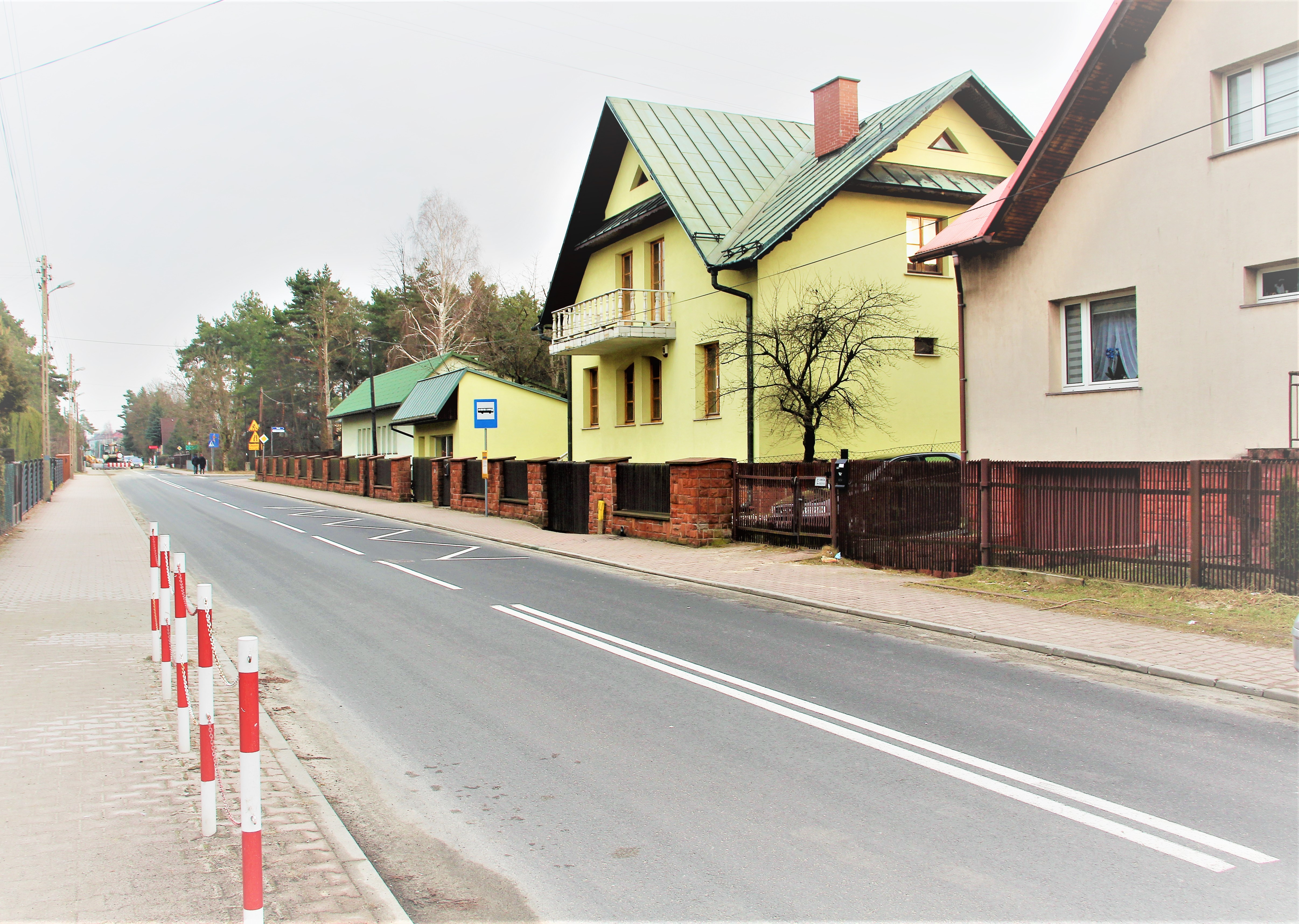

- Flag Coat of arms

- Location within Poland
- Coordinates: 50°16′5″N 19°27′47″E
- Country: Poland
- Voivodeship: Lesser Poland
- County: Olkusz
- Gmina: Bukowno (urban gmina)
- First mentioned: 15th century
- Town rights: 1962

Government
  - Mayor: Mirosław Gajdziszewski

Area
  - Total: 63.42 km^{2} (24.49 sq mi)

Population (31 December 2021)
  - Total: 9,876
  - Density: 155.7/km^{2} (403.3/sq mi)
- Time zone: UTC+1 (CET)
  - Summer (DST): UTC+2 (CEST)
- Postal code: 32-332
- Car plates: KOL
- Website: http://www.miastobukowno.pl/

Bukowno [buˈkɔvnɔ] is a town in Olkusz County, Lesser Poland Voivodeship, Poland. Before 1975 it belonged to the Kraków Voivodeship and in 1975-1998 to the Katowice Voivodeship. Bukowno is located in western part of Lesser Poland Voivodeship, between Katowice and Kraków about 40 km (24.85 mi) away from both towns. As of December 2021, the town has a population of 9,876.

Bukowno is situated on the Sztoła River, and belongs to the Jaworzno - Chrzanów Industrial District, which is part of historic Lesser Poland, and is located in the Lesser Polish Upland, amidst deciduous and coniferous forests. Bukowno is a major center of industry, with zinc and lead plants. The town has the area of 63 km^{2}., of which 73% is forested. Bukowno is a rail hub, with rail connections to Olkusz, Kielce, Jaworzno and Katowice. It also is located along the Broad Gauge Metallurgy Line. Five kilometers north of town goes National Road Nr. 94.

== History ==
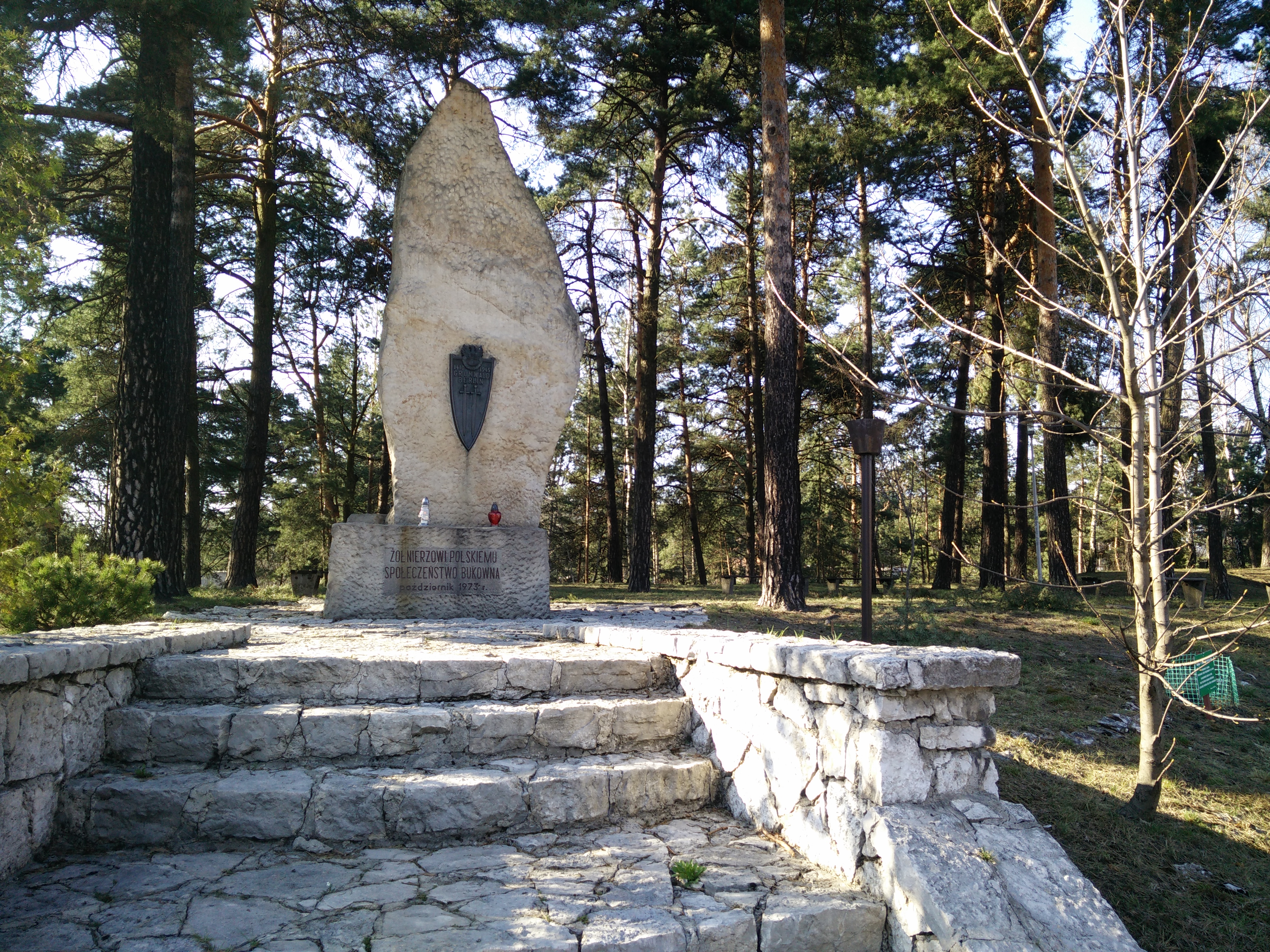
Memorial to Polish soldiers

As a village, it was first mentioned in the 15th century, but did not receive its town charter until 1962. In the Middle Ages Bukowno belonged to the Bishops of Kraków, and since its foundation until 1790 was part of the so-called Sławków Estate.

In 1795 it was annexed by Austria in the Third Partition of Poland. It was regained by Poles as a result of the Austro-Polish War in 1809 and became part of the short-lived Polish Duchy of Warsaw, and in 1815, for the first time in history, it was administratively separated from Kraków, as together with Olkusz, it became part of Russian-controlled Congress Poland, while the city of Kraków remained in Austrian Galicia. After Poland regained independence, in 1918–1939 it belonged to Second Polish Republic’s Kielce Voivodeship. Following the joint German-Soviet invasion of Poland, which started World War II in 1939, it was under German occupation until 1945. After the war it was transferred to the Kraków Voivodeship.
