= Wolbrom =

Town in Lesser Poland Voivodeship, Poland

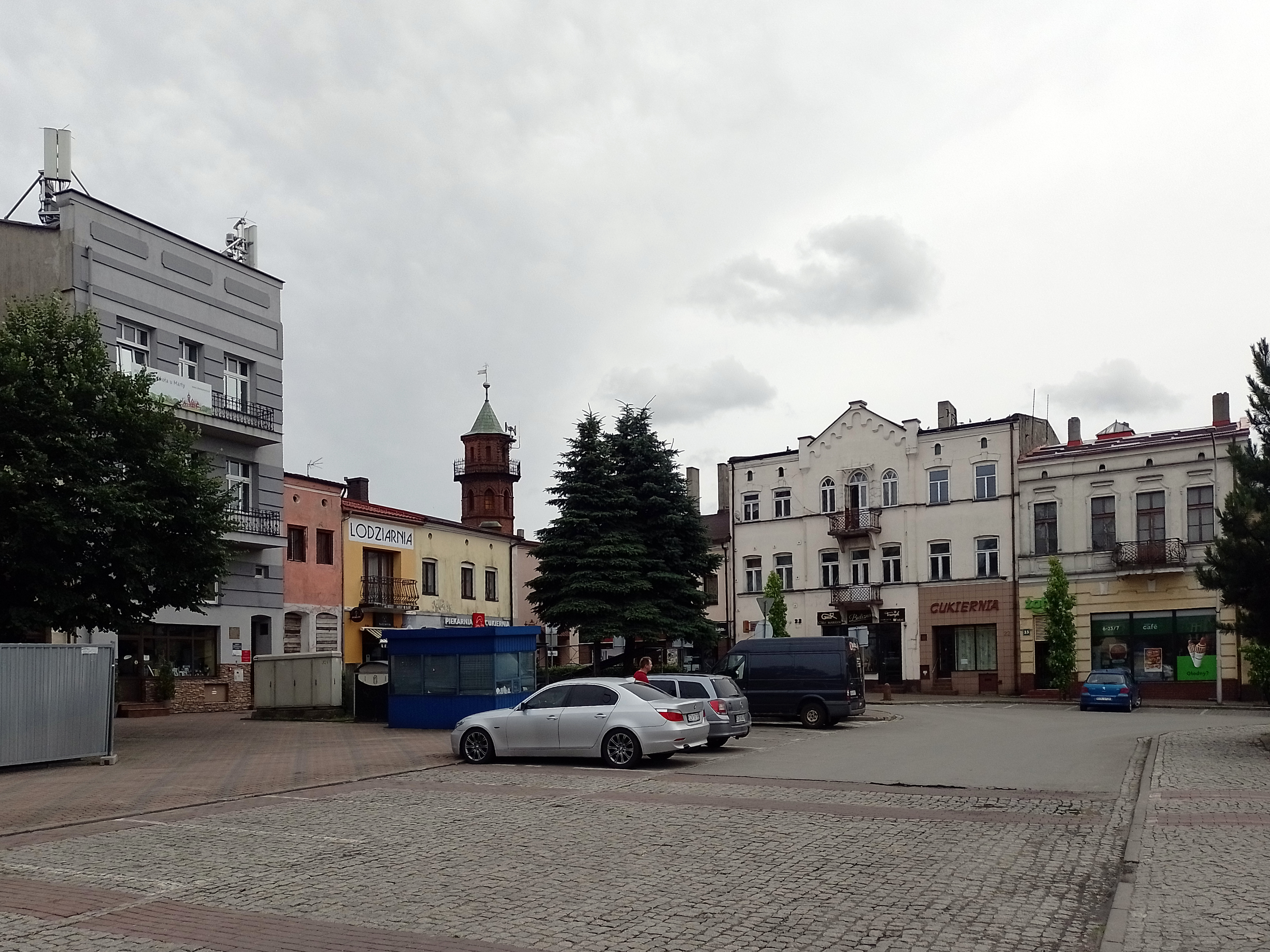
- Town square

- Flag Coat of arms

- Location within Poland
- Coordinates: 50°24′N 19°46′E
- Country: Poland
- Voivodeship: Lesser Poland
- County: Olkusz
- Gmina: Wolbrom
- Town rights: 1327

Government
  - Mayor: Radosław Kuś

Area
  - Total: 9.74 km^{2} (3.76 sq mi)
- Elevation: 380 m (1,250 ft)

Population (2010)
  - Total: 8,942
  - Density: 918/km^{2} (2,380/sq mi)
- Time zone: UTC+1 (CET)
  - Summer (DST): UTC+2 (CEST)
- Postal code: 32-340
- Car plates: KOL
- Website: http://www.wolbrom.pl

Wolbrom [ˈvɔlbrɔm] (Yiddish: וואָלבראָם, romanized: Volbrom) is a town in Olkusz County, Lesser Poland Voivodeship, in southern Poland, with 8,942 people (2010).

Wolbrom lies in the Kraków-Częstochowa Upland, which is also called the Polish Jura. South of the town there is Kamienna Mountain, with a steel cross on top, and a great view of Wolbrom. The town lies 375–380 meters (1,230–1,247 ft) above sea level, and its area, as of 1 January 2011, was 10.12 square kilometers (3.91 sq mi). In 1885, Wolbrom received a rail station, along a newly built route from Dęblin to Dąbrowa Górnicza. The town is also located along the Broad Gauge Metallurgy Line.

== History ==
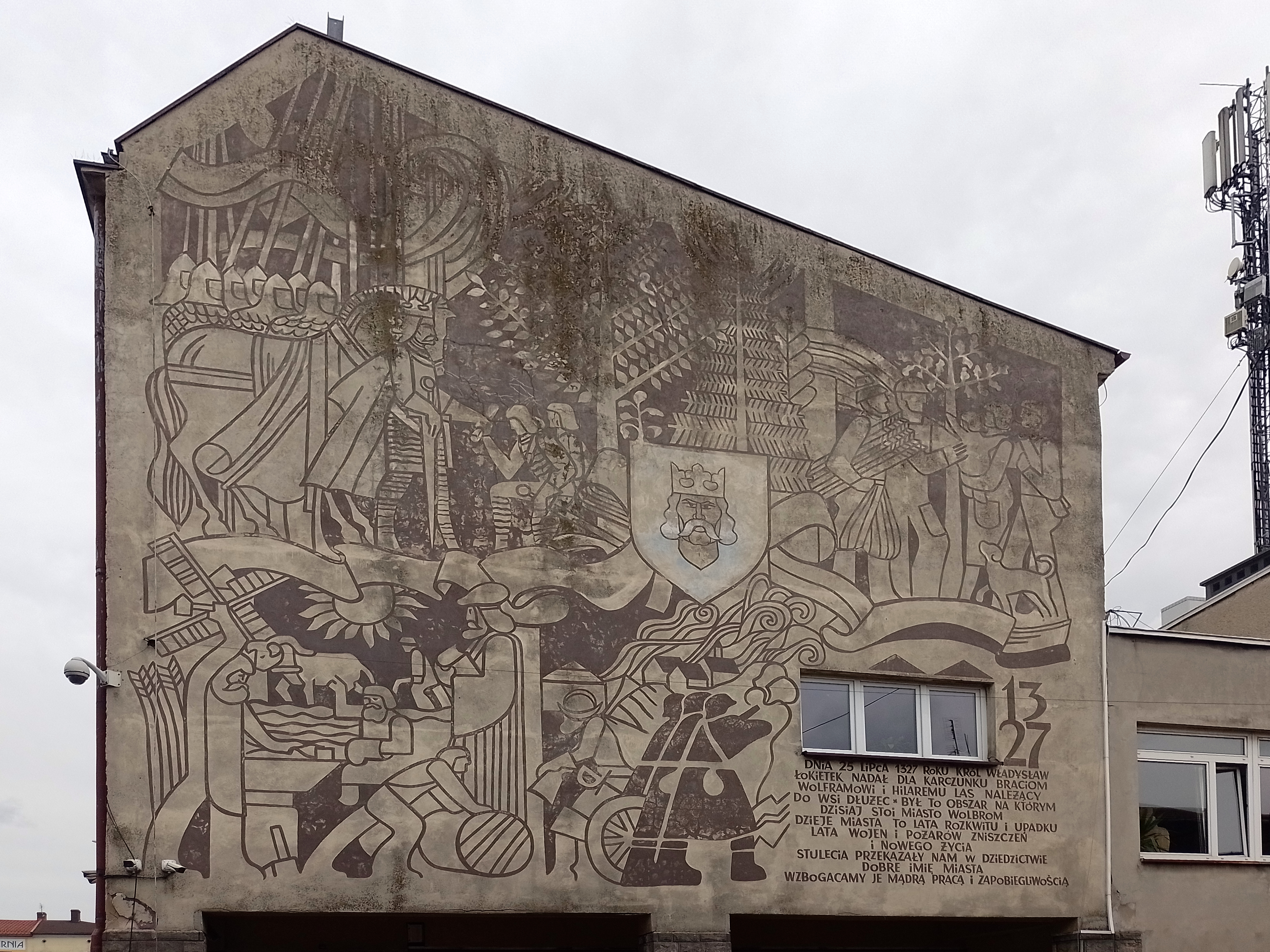
Mural commemorating the granting of town rights by King Władysław Łokietek in 1327

The history of the town dates back to the year 1311, when King Władysław Łokietek gave permission to found a settlement called Wolwrami, located in a large forest on the border between Lesser Poland and Silesia. The founders of the settlement allegedly were brothers named Wolframi (germ: Wolfram) and Hilary from Kraków, and the village was named after one of them. Wolbrom received its Magdeburg rights town charter in 1327, lost it in 1869 and got it back in 1930.

In the Kingdom of Poland, Wolbrom was located in Kraków Voivodeship in the Lesser Poland Province, along a busy merchant route from Lesser Poland to Silesia and Greater Poland. It was a Polish royal town. In 1400, King Władysław Jagiełło issued a bill, which ordered all merchants travelling from Kraków to Greater Poland to go through Wolbrom. The town had a parish church with a school and a hospital for the poor. Every Thursday it had a fair, whose tradition is kept until now. In 1485 most of the wooden buildings burned in a fire, after which King Casimir IV Jagiellon granted Wolbrom additional privileges. Wolbrom prospered, like the whole of Lesser Poland, until the mid-17th century. The town was almost completely destroyed by the Swedes in the deluge, furthermore, the ancient merchant route became obsolete and was not used any longer. In 1660, the town had only 85 buildings, with 500 inhabitants. The 6th Polish Infantry Regiment was stationed in Wolbrom in 1790.

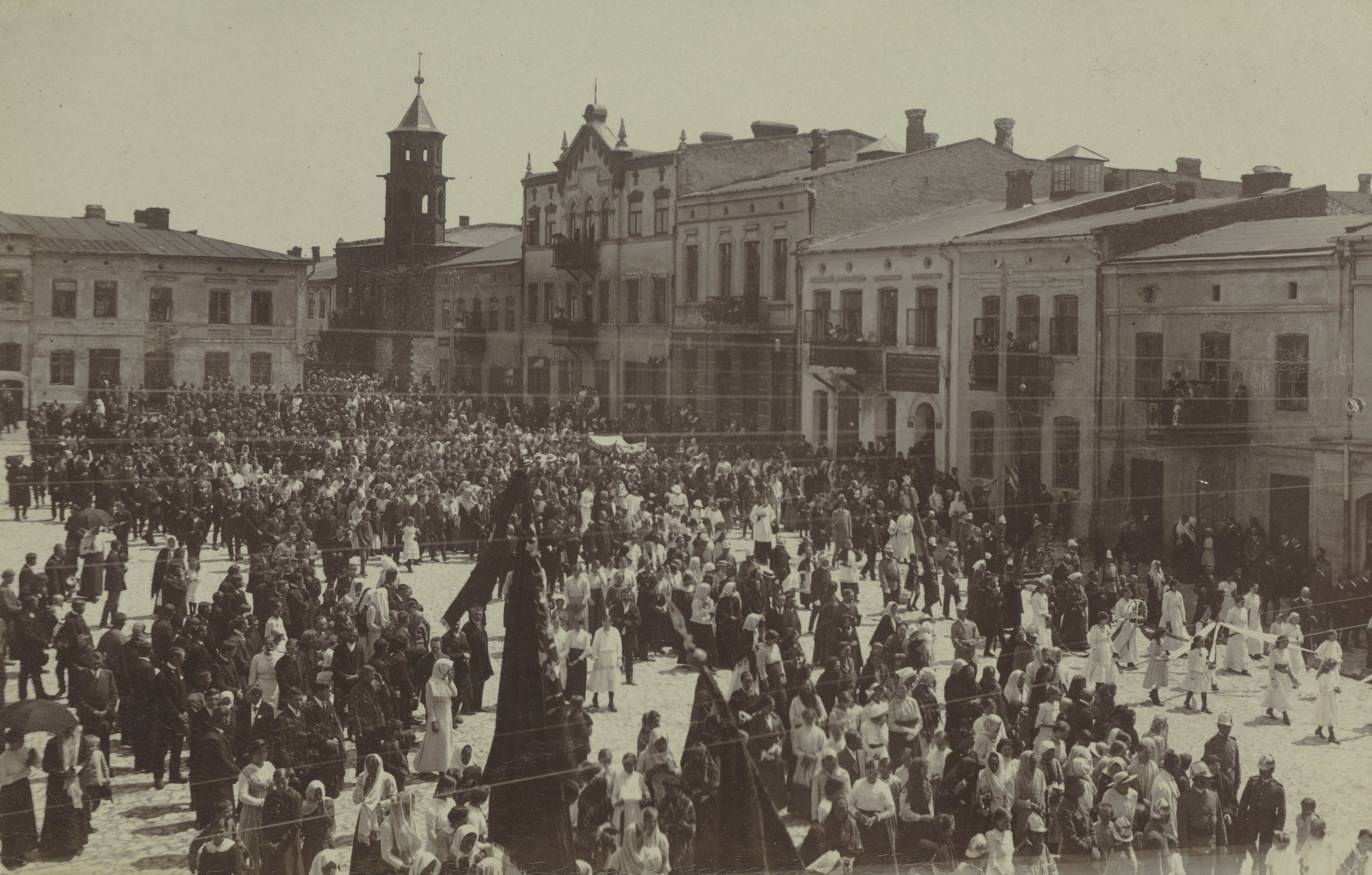
Festivities in the main square in c. 1916

After the Partitions of Poland, Wolbrom belonged to Russian-controlled Congress Poland (since 1815). As a punishment for the January Uprising, the Russians stripped it of the town charter, and Wolbrom remained a village from 1869 to 1930. At the beginning of World War I it was captured by the Austrians, who, together with the Germans, ruled Wolbrom until November 1918. In the Second Polish Republic, Wolbrom belonged to Kielce Voivodeship, and even though it officially remained a village until 1930, it was bigger than Miechów or Olkusz.

During World War II, almost all Jewish inhabitants of the town were murdered by the Germans in the Holocaust. German authorities opened a ghetto here in the autumn of 1941, with 8,000 crowded in it. In September 1942, Germans and Ukrainians murdered 600, mostly elderly Jews, and the remaining people were transported by train to Belzec extermination camp. The Polish resistance movement was active in the town and area, including a local unit of the Home Army under the cryptonym "Wróbel" ("Sparrow"). On 25 July 1944, Polish partisans launched a successful raid against German forces in Wolbrom. During the Warsaw Uprising, in September 1944, the Germans deported 4,000 Poles (mainly old people, ill people and women with children) from the Dulag 121 camp in Pruszków, where they were initially imprisoned, to Wolbrom.

After German occupation ended the town was restored to Poland, although with a Soviet-installed communist regime, which stayed in power until the Fall of Communism in the 1980s. In the following years, the Polish anti-communist resistance was active in Wolbrom, including the local Underground Army (Armia Podziemna).

== Demographics ==
Historical population

Year	Pop.	±%
1910	6,563	—
1921	7,229	+10.1%
1931	8,930	+23.5%
1939	9,946	+11.4%

Year	Pop.	±%
1950	5,560	−44.1%
1960	6,511	+17.1%
2010	8,942	+37.3%

== Sights ==
Like in other medieval towns in Europe, the center of Wolbrom is marked by a market square, with several 19th-century tenement houses, and an early 17th-century Baroque parish church.

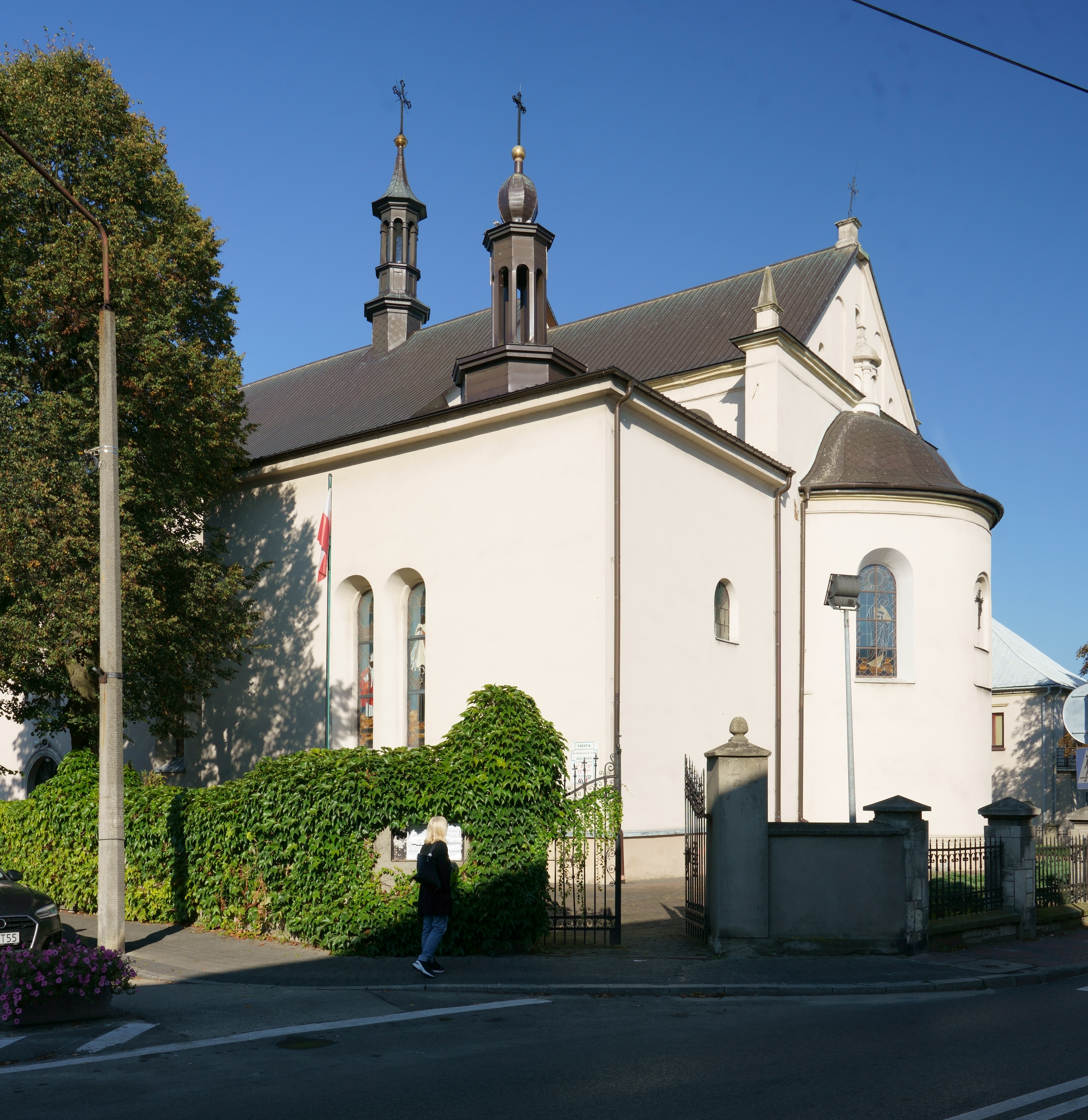
Saint Catherine church

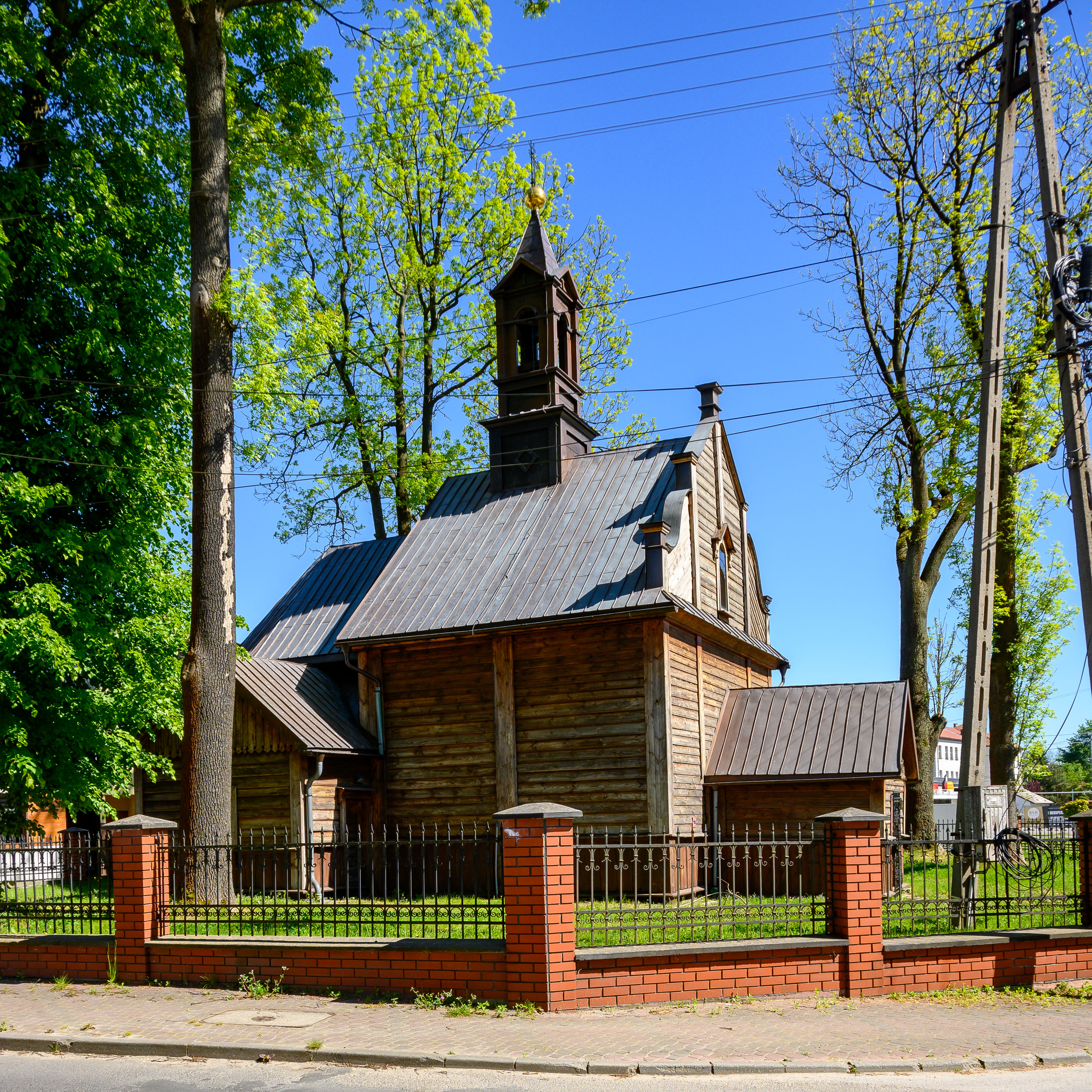
Church of the Immaculate Conception

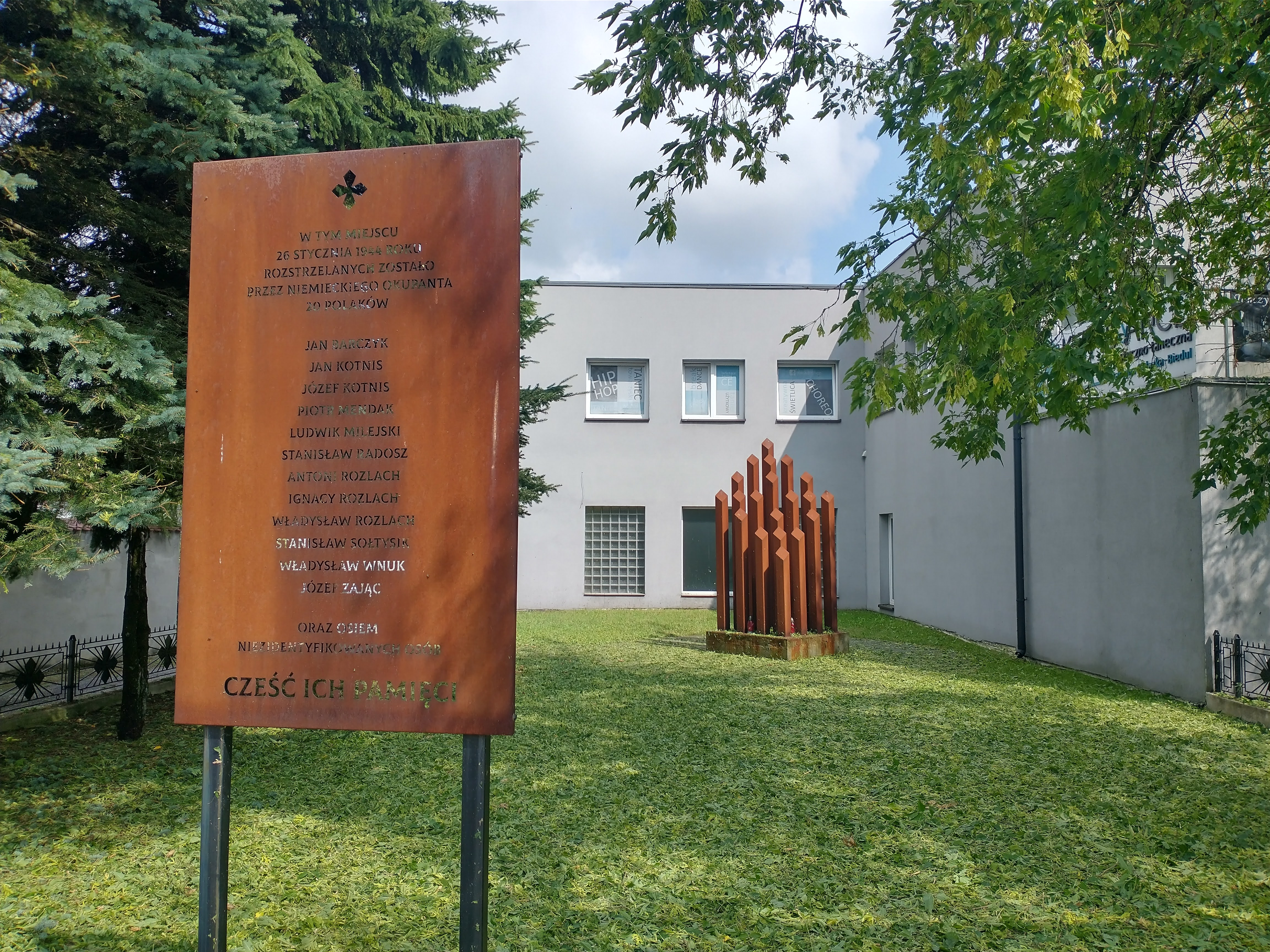
Memorial at the site of a German-perpetrated massacre of 20 Poles from 1944

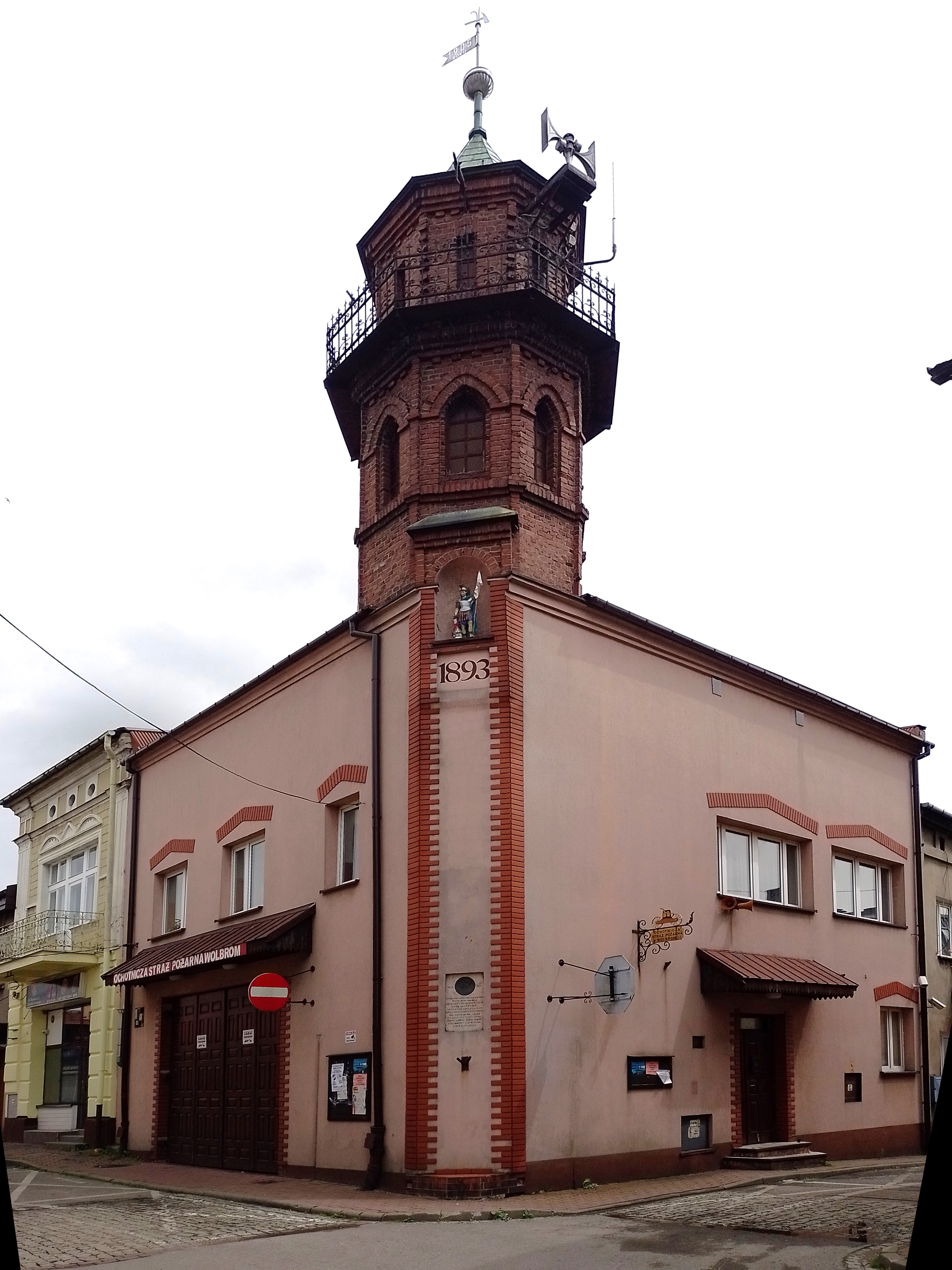
Fire department

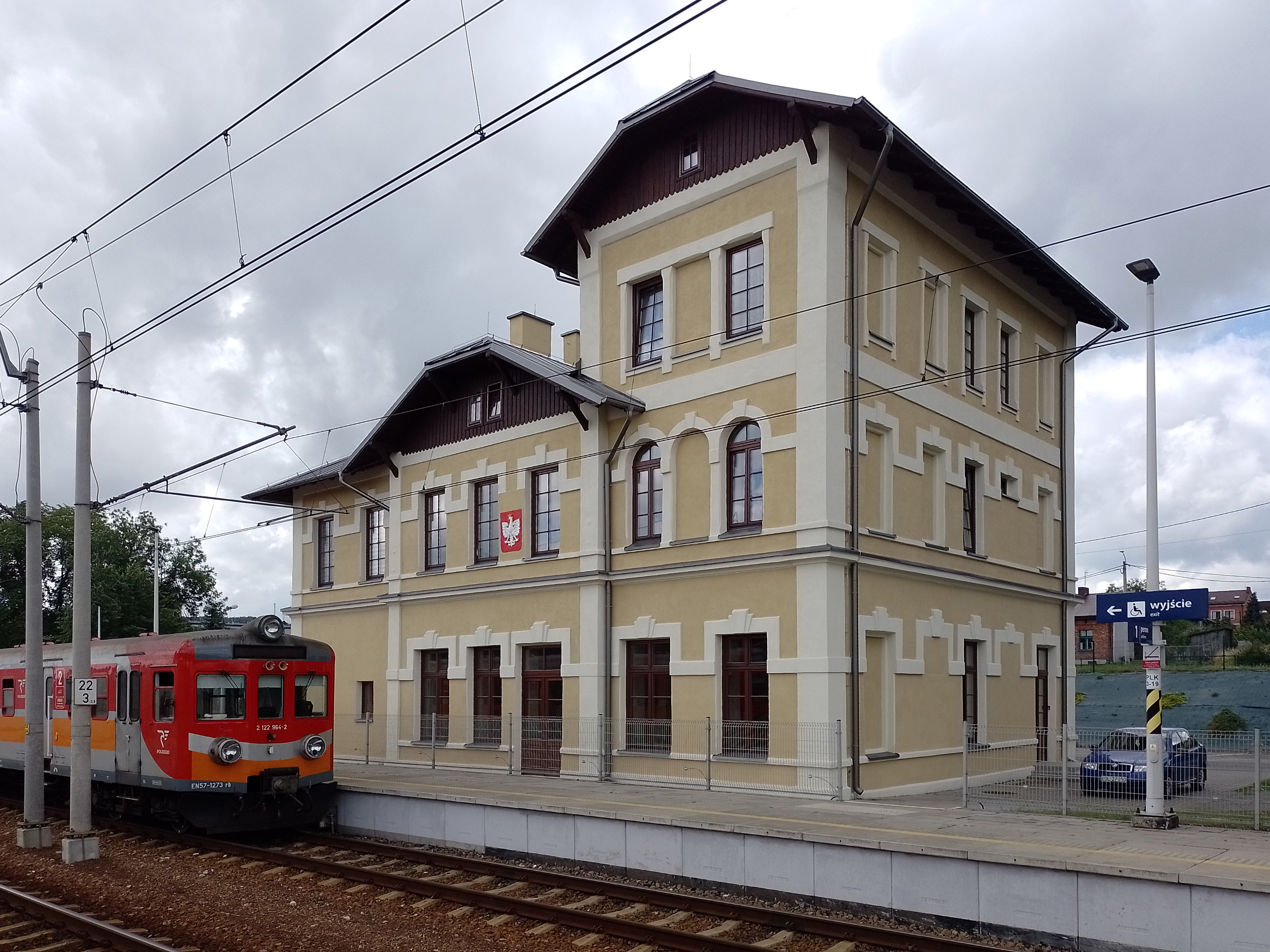
Railway station

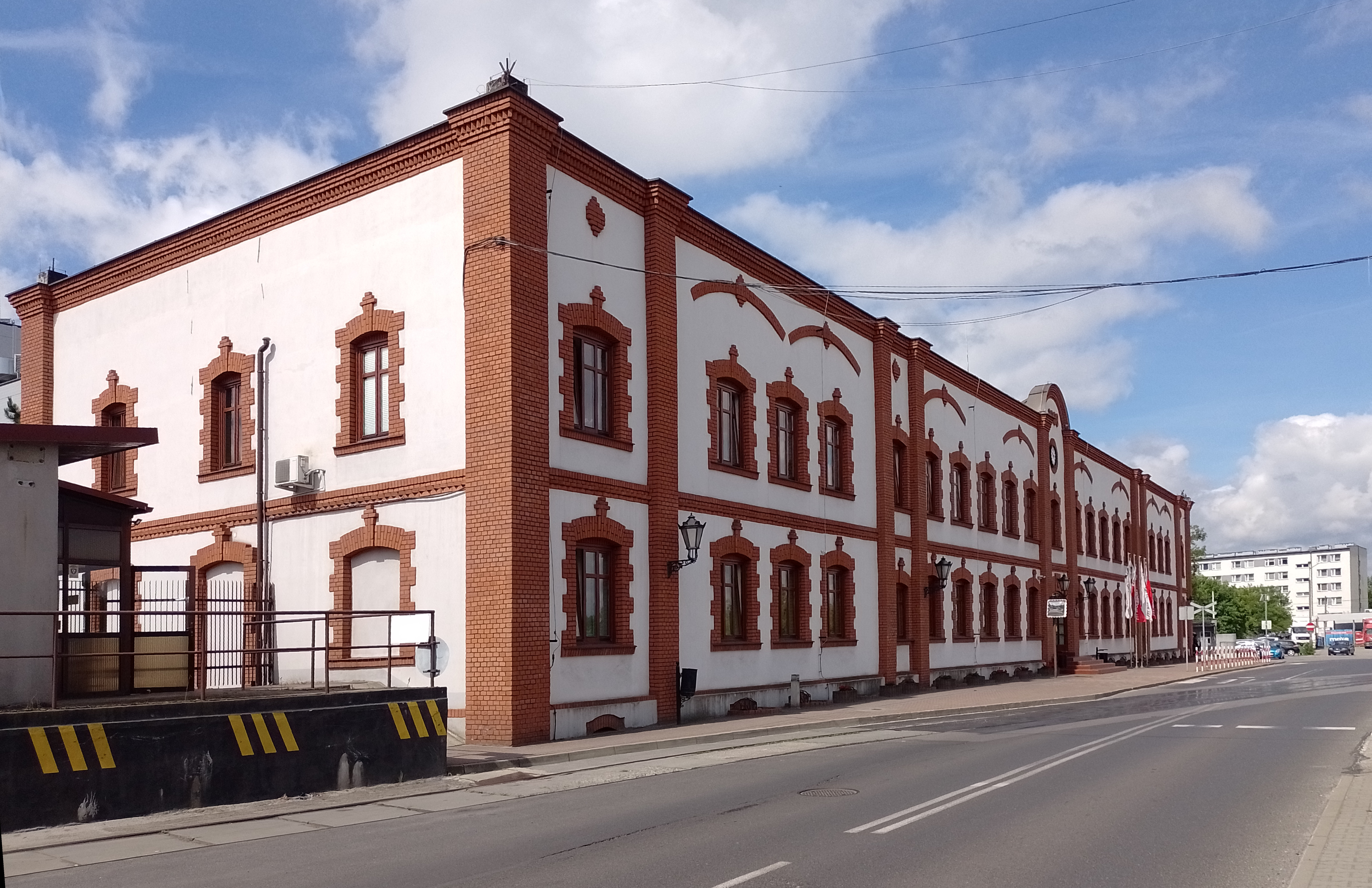
Conveyor belts factory

== Sport ==
- Przebój Wolbrom - football club
