= Dłużec, Lesser Poland Voivodeship =

Dłużec
- Village
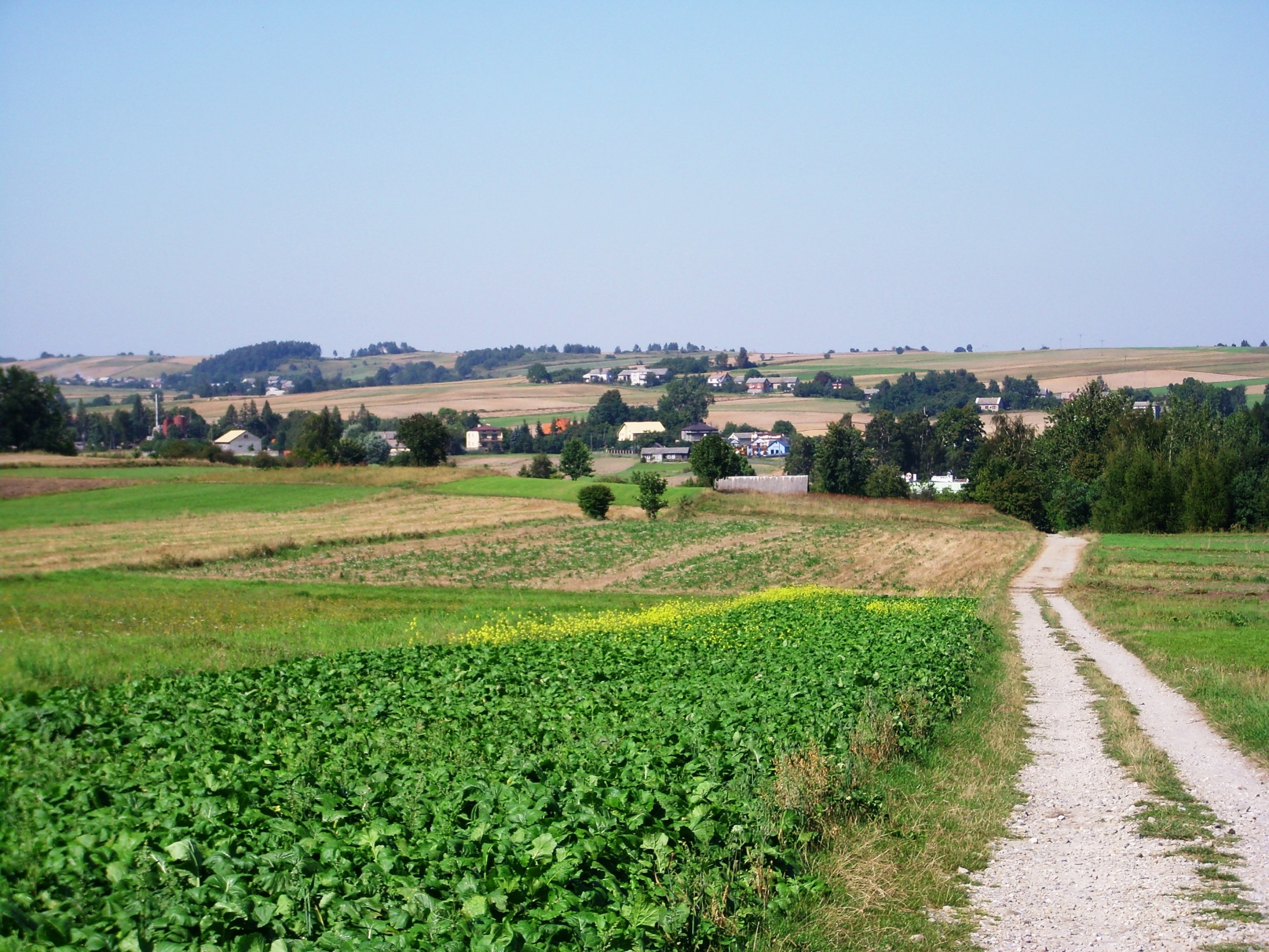

- Location within Poland
- Coordinates: 50°24′N 19°43′E
- Country: Poland
- Voivodeship: Lesser Poland
- County: Olkusz
- Gmina: Wolbrom

Dłużec [ˈdwuʐɛt͡s] is a village in Gmina Wolbrom, Olkusz County, Lesser Poland Voivodeship, Poland.
