= Olkusz County =

Olkusz County Powiat olkuski
- County
- Flag Coat of arms

- Location within the voivodeship
- Coordinates (Olkusz): 50°17′N 19°34′E
- Country: Poland
- Voivodeship: Lesser Poland
- Seat: Olkusz
- Gminas: Total 6 (incl. 1 urban): Bukowno; Gmina Bolesław; Gmina Klucze; Gmina Olkusz; Gmina Trzyciąż; Gmina Wolbrom

Area
  - Total: 622.19 km^{2} (240.23 sq mi)

Population (2008)
  - Total: 113,910
  - Density: 183.08/km^{2} (474.17/sq mi)
  - Urban: 57,322
  - Rural: 56,964
- Car plates: KOL
- Website: www.sp.olkusz.pl

Olkusz County (Polish: powiat olkuski) is a unit of territorial administration and local government (powiat) in Lesser Poland Voivodeship, southern Poland. It came into being on January 1, 1999, as a result of the Polish local government reforms passed in 1998. Its administrative seat and largest town is Olkusz, which lies 37 kilometres (23 mi) north-west of the regional capital Kraków. The county also contains the towns of Bukowno, lying 8 km (5 mi) west of Olkusz, and Wolbrom, 20 km (12 mi) north-east of Olkusz.

The county covers an area of 622.19 square kilometres (240.2 sq mi). As of 2008 its total population is 113,910, out of which the population of Olkusz is 37,552, that of Bukowno is 10,695, that of Wolbrom is 9,075, and the rural population is 56,964.

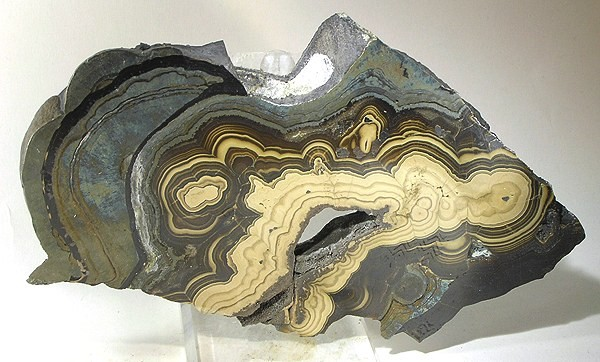
Marcasite, Galena, Sphalerite ore specimen, Olkusz Mine. Size 20.8 x 12.2 x 1.2 cm.

== Neighbouring counties ==
Olkusz County is bordered by Zawiercie County to the north, Miechów County to the east, Kraków County to the south-east, Chrzanów County to the south-west, and the city of Dąbrowa Górnicza and Będzin County to the west.

== Administrative division ==
The county is subdivided into six gminas (one urban, two urban-rural and three rural). These are listed in the following table, in descending order of population.

Gmina	Type	Area (km^{2})	Population (2006)	Seat
Gmina Olkusz	urban-rural	150.7	50,289	Olkusz
Gmina Wolbrom	urban-rural	150.8	23,454	Wolbrom
Gmina Klucze	rural	119.3	14,895	Klucze
Bukowno	urban	63.4	10,695	
Gmina Bolesław	rural	41.4	7,822	Bolesław
Gmina Trzyciąż	rural	96.6	7,131	Trzyciąż

== Industry ==
ZGH Boleslaw is a leading miner and producer of zinc products in eastern Europe. The history of zinc mining in the area dates to the 12th century when Casimir II the Just set up a mining settlement in the old area of Olkusz. The company has modernized its plants, and earned an ISO 9001 certificate.
