= 65th Guards Rifle Division =

65th Guards Rifle Division (May 1, 1943 – 1947)
- Active: 1943–1947
- Country: Soviet Union
- Branch: Red Army
- Type: Division
- Role: Infantry
- Engagements: Battle of Smolensk (1943); Orsha Offensives (1943); Battle of Nevel (1943); Pskov-Ostrov Offensive; Baltic Offensive; Riga Offensive (1944); Courland Pocket
- Battle honours: Riga

Commanders
- Notable commanders: Col. Aleksandr Efimovich Vinogradov; Col. Yakov Ivanovich Dmitriev; Maj. Gen. Mikhail Fedorovich Andriushchenko

The 65th Guards Rifle Division was formed as an infantry division of the Red Army in May 1943, based on the 2nd formations of the 75th and 78th Rifle Brigades. It served in that role until after the end of World War II.

Along with its "sister", the 56th Guards Rifle Division, the 65th was formed "out of sequence". This meant that many Guards rifle divisions were higher numbered and formed earlier than the 65th. Following its formation, the division was immediately assigned to the 19th Guards Rifle Corps of the 10th Guards Army, where it remained for the duration of the war.

It first saw action in the summer offensive on the Western Front, known as Operation Suvorov. In the winter of 1943–44, it participated in the fighting north and east of Vitebsk, first as part of the Western Front and later as part of the 2nd Baltic Front. Subsequently, during the summer offensives, it helped break through the German Panther Line's defences and advanced into the Baltic states. For this, it eventually received a battle honor for its role in capturing Riga. For the remainder of the war, it contributed to the blockade of the remnants of German Army Group North in the Courland Pocket in Latvia, by then assigned to the Leningrad Front. After the war, the 65th Guards was moved to Estonia, where it was disbanded in 1947.

== Preceding Formations ==
The 65th Guards was formed on the basis of two rifle brigades which had been part of the 6th "Stalin Siberian Volunteer" Rifle Corps (later redesignated as the 19th Guards Rifle Corps).

=== 75th Rifle Brigade ===
The second formation of this brigade occurred in late July 1942, when it was redesignated from the 2nd Omsk Volunteer Brigade within the Siberian Military District Its order of battle consisted of:

- 1st, 2nd, 3rd, and 4th Rifle Battalions
- Artillery Battalion (12 76 mm cannon)
- Antitank Battalion (18 57 mm guns)
- 120 mm Mortar Battalion
- Submachine Gun Battalion
- 82 mm Mortar Battery

This was the second of the Siberian Volunteer Brigades, and it had, on September 15, 6,059 personnel. 33.4 per cent of them were Communist Party members or Komsomols. It was assigned to the 6th Rifle Corps and, in late September, sent under that command to the Kalinin area of the Moscow Military District. By November 1, the Corps had been assigned to the 22nd Army of the Kalinin Front, facing the western side of the German-held Rzhev salient.

=== 78th Rifle Brigade ===
The second formation of this brigade also took place in late July, when it was redesignated the 3rd Krasnoyarsk Volunteer Brigade in the Siberian Military District. Its order of battle was very similar to that of the 75th, with additional support elements:

- 1st, 2nd, 3rd, and 4th Rifle Battalions
- Artillery Battalion (12 × 76 mm cannon)
- Antitank Battalion (18 × 57 mm guns)
- 120mm Mortar Battalion (209 men, 12 mortars)
- Submachine Gun Battalion
- Sapper Battalion
- Antitank Rifle Company (36 antitank rifles)
- 82 mm Mortar Battery
- Reconnaissance Company
- Motor Transport Battalion (50 trucks)

When formed, the brigade had 5,982 personnel on September 15, of whom 37.8 per cent were Communist Party members or Komsomols. It was also assigned to the 6th Rifle Corps and moved with it to the Kalinin Front. Once assembled, the Corps consisted of the 150th Rifle Division and the 74th, 75th, 78th, and 91st Rifle Brigades. Prior to the start of Operation Mars, it was transferred to the 41st Army, still in the Kalinin Front.

==== Operation Mars ====
In the plan for this offensive, the 6th Rifle Corps, commanded by Maj. Gen. S. I. Povetkin was to assault the German front south of Bely to provide a passage behind German lines for the 1st Mechanized Corps. The 150th Division and the 75th and 74th Rifle Brigades were in the first echelon, with the 78th and 91st Brigades in the second. The offensive began on November 25, and the 75th Brigade, commanded by Col. Aleksandr Efimovich Vinogradov, routed elements of the 2nd Luftwaffe Field Division. They broke through the German defenses and continued to advance. The next day, the two brigades continued to push forward towards Bykovo, the 74th supported by companies of the 65th Tank Brigade. By November 27, German reserves were arriving, and the 91st Brigade was alerted for commitment, whereas Col. I. P. Sivakov's 78th Brigade remained in Corps reserve. By December 1, the 78th had also been committed east of the 75th, and they were deep inside the 41st Army's salient, southeast of Bely.

Early on December 4, the 41st Army went over to the defense, and the 75th and 78th were ordered to move to the southwest to face the SS Cavalry Brigade and the remnants of the 2nd Luftwaffe being besieged in the defensive position of Demekhi by the 17th Guards Rifle Division. During December 5–6, the German forces encircled most of the 41st Army south of Bely, with the 19th Panzer Division breaking through the 78th Brigade north of Podselitsa. The commander of the 41st Army, Maj. Gen. G. F. Tarasov ordered Colonel Vinogradov to wheel the left flank of his brigade back toward Demekhi to join with the 17th Guards in erecting new defenses to prevent any deeper German advance across the Vishenka River. Colonel Sivakov, whose brigade was weakened, was ordered to assemble as many troops as possible and hold on to new defensive positions around Shevnino. However, it was seized before Sivakov's men could intervene.

Late on December 7, the 65th and 219th Tank Brigades of the 1st Mechanized Corps cooperated with the 78th Brigade and various Soviet rear service troops to make another effort to retake Shevnino, but were stopped. Being closer to the base of the salient, the 75th and 78th were able to largely avoid the situation faced by the 91st and 74th, which were encircled by this time. Sivakov was ordered to join Vinogradov's unit and the two tank brigades (down to fewer than ten tanks each) along the Vishenka. This line was reinforced late the next day by the just-arrived 279th Rifle Division and the weakened 150th. From December 9–14, the encircled forces made multiple attempts to escape. A final effort was made on the night of December 15/16. In an after-action report, the 1st Panzer Division reported the 74th, 75th, and 91st Brigades as "destroyed", whereas the 78th had suffered heavier casualties than the 75th, and the 91st still had about 2,800 men on strength after its breakout.

During February 1943, the 6th Rifle Corps returned to the 22nd Army. By the beginning of March, the Corps had been withdrawn to the reserves of the Kalinin Front. Later that month, it returned to the 22nd Army, but did not remain with that Army when it was transferred to the Northwestern Front in April. Instead, the 75th and 78th Brigades were moved to the Gzhatsk area, where they were merged to form the 65th Guards Rifle Division in the redesignated 19th Guards Rifle Corps. By June 1, the Corps had joined the former 30th Army of the Western Front, now redesignated as the 10th Guards Army; the Corps also contained the 22nd and 56th Guards Rifle Divisions.

== Formation ==
The 65th Guards officially received its Guards title on May 1. The division's order of battle was as follows:

- 255th Guards Rifle Regiment
- 257th Guards Rifle Regiment
- 259th Guards Rifle Regiment
- 190th Guards Artillery Regiment
- 92nd Guards Antitank Battalion
- 88th Guards Reconnaissance Company
- 98th Guards Sapper Battalion
- 118th Guards Signal Battalion
- 93rd Medical/Sanitation Battalion
- 89th Guards Chemical Defense (Anti-gas) Company
- 91st Guards Motor Transport Company
- 90th Guards Field Bakery
- 85th Guards Divisional Veterinary Hospital
- 2062nd Field Postal Station
- 1222nd Field Office of the State Bank

Colonel Vinogradov, who had commanded the 75th Brigade, was appointed to command of the division on the same day. It spent the next three months working up before the start of the Western Front's summer offensive on August 7.

== Operation Suvorov ==
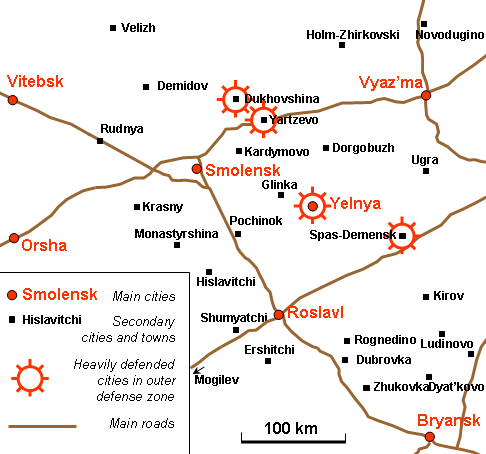
General layout of the Smolensk region during the battle.

The Front's main effort was made between Yelnya and Spas-Demensk by the 10th Guards and 33rd Armies. The 10th Guards' 15th and 19th Guards Corps were deployed on a 10 km-wide sector between Mazovo and Sluzna; the 65th and 56th Guards Divisions were in the first echelon, with the 22nd Guards in the second. Each division had about 8,000 personnel on strength. The 5th Mechanized Corps was assembled behind the Army to take advantage of the expected breakthrough. The operational objective for the first day of the offensive was the town of Pavlinovo, situated on the Smolensk-Spas-Demensk railway, 10 km to the south. The German defense in this sector was based on the Büffel-Stellung position, held by XII Army Corps. The Corps' 260th and 268th Infantry Divisions had both been reduced to two infantry regiments and held wide sectors, but the terrain was heavily wooded and dotted with numerous fortified villages. Two key German positions at Gnezdilovo and nearby Hill 233.3 had not been identified by Soviet intelligence and so were not affected by the preparatory bombardment.

That bombardment began at 0440 hours and continued until 0630, consuming more than 50 percent of Western Front's available ammunition. Shortly after crossing the start line, the 65th and 56th Guards encountered heavy resistance from the 499th Regiment of the 268th Infantry. That Division's artillery broke up the assault groups before they could make any progress, while a pair of German assault guns knocked out advancing T-34s of the supporting 119th Tank Regiment. Some small detachments found a way through, but the 19th Guards Corps were stopped. The 15th Guards Corps made somewhat greater progress against the portion of the 499th Regiment that it faced. By the early afternoon, the commander of Western Front, Col. Gen. V. D. Sokolovsky, was making command changes and committing additional forces. During the rest of the afternoon, the 10th Guards Army's infantry gradually outflanked the remaining strongpoints of the 499th Regiment, and once night fell, the 268th Infantry was authorized to pull back 2–3 km to form a new line. Meanwhile, a battlegroup of the 2nd Panzer Division, de-training near Yelnya, was ordered to march to support that Division.

The offensive resumed at 0730 hours on August 8 after a 30-minute artillery preparation. The division, soon reinforced by the 22nd Guards, captured Veselukha almost immediately. However, both divisions remained halted in front of Hill 233.3, held by the 1st Battalion of the 488th Grenadier Regiment with a company of assault engineers and armor support, dug-in behind minefields, barbed wire, and other obstacles. A further attack by the 65th Guards from 1030 to 1430 hours on August 9 was also repulsed; Hill 233.3 was not taken until the evening of August 10 by the reinforcing 29th Guards Rifle Division and the 23rd Tank Brigade. A few hours earlier, the 56th Guards, now supported by the 249th Tank Regiment, had captured the village of Delyagino, causing the German forces to retreat 2 km to the south. These gains compromised the Büffel-Stellung and allowed the 10th Guards Army to finally reach the Smolensk - Spas-Demensk railway; the XII Corps was now forced to retreat until Sokolovsky's offensive outran its logistical support. The Western Front's artillery had already expended almost all of its available ammunition.

On August 12, the 10th Guards Army launched another assault and captured Gnezdilovo. By late afternoon, the XII Corps' front was deteriorating, and Soviet infantry and tanks were approaching Pavlinovo despite German reinforcements. The Corps was ordered to evacuate Spas-Demensk overnight. By August 14, Sokolovsky brought the 21st Army into the 10th Guards Army's sector, allowing the latter to pull back for rest and rebuilding. During this downtime, Colonel Vinogradov was accused by Sokolovsky of having "lost control" of the division and failure to achieve his combat missions and relieved on August 16 and replaced the next day by Col. Yakov Ivanovich Dmitriev. On August 21, the STAVKA authorized a suspension of the offensive. German losses had been heavy. The 10th Guards Army had also suffered 30 per cent casualties, and the 65th Guards had been heavily damaged, having 75 per cent of its personnel killed or wounded in seven days of fighting.

=== The Liberation of Yelnya ===
The offensive was renewed on August 28, with the 10th Guards, 21st, 33rd and 68th Armies in the center of the Front making the main attack. The objective was to cripple the XII Army Corps and then push mobile groups through the gaps to capture Yelnya. At 0800 hours, the Front began a 90-minute artillery preparation across a 25-km wide front southeast of the city. The 10th Guards and 21st Armies attacked a German battlegroup around Terenino station, held by one infantry battalion and an engineer unit. German reserves were brought in, and the battle alternated for about eight hours until the German battlegroup collapsed and retreated to the Ugra River. In total, the two Soviet armies advanced from 6 to 8 km. The next day, the 10th Guards defeated the German elements that had failed to make it over the Ugra and began pushing up the rail line toward Yelnya. Despite intervention by the battlegroup of 2nd Panzer, the 10th Guards pushed back the right flank of the 342nd Infantry Division, with the 29th Guards and the 119th Tank Regiment in the lead. Yelnya was evacuated during the afternoon and was captured on August 30.

Although it was only 75 km to Smolensk, by September 3, the German 4th Army had established a tenuous new front west of Yelnya. Sokolovsky continued local attacks through the first week of the month, but his Western Front was again forced to a halt due to logistical shortages; he was authorized to pause the offensive for another week. During the night of September 14/15, Sokolovsky's center group of armies conducted aggressive probing all along the front of the German IX Army Corps, which was holding a 40 km-wide line with five weakened divisions; known German positions were also assaulted with artillery. At 0545 hours, a 90-minute artillery preparation began, followed by an intense air bombardment. The ground attack began at 0715, south of the Smolensk - Yelnya railroad. At 1030 hours, the 10th Guards Army struck the left flank of the 330th Infantry Division with a mass of infantry and tanks, pushing back two battalions. The Army, in cooperation with the 21st Army, continued attacking into the afternoon, creating several small penetrations and advancing up to 3 km.

=== The Liberation of Smolensk ===
Overnight, the 330th Infantry made minor withdrawals to straighten its front. On September 16, the 10th Guards Army, now led by the 15th Guards Corps, failed to make any substantive gains. However, by the end of the day that IX Corps was close to breaking. During the night, it fell back to the next defensive line, which was mostly incomplete. Sokolovsky ordered a pursuit to approach Smolensk from the south with the 10th Guards and 68th Armies and most of his armor. The retreat of the 330th Infantry was covered by the Tiger tanks of heavy Panzer-Abteilung 505. Supply problems forced the Soviet armies to pause for a few days outside Smolensk before making the final push. On the morning of September 22, the 68th Army made a clear breakthrough southeast of the city. Late on the 23rd, the German 4th Army signalled the evacuation of Smolensk. During the next day, the Soviet forces probed the German defenses but did not begin their attacks until nightfall. By 0600 hours on September 25, most of Smolensk was recaptured, although much of it was destroyed or damaged.

== Battles for Orsha ==
By October 2, the 10th Guards Army had reached a line from Liady southwards along the Mereia River to the town of Baevo. Early on October 3, the Army launched an assault as part of the Western Front's offensive on Orsha. The 65th and 22nd Guards Divisions were in the first echelon of 19th Guards Corps, with the 56th Guards in the second as the Corps prepared to attack across the river between Kiseli and Kovshichi, facing the boundary of the 18th and 25th Panzer Grenadier Divisions. Fierce fighting developed at the crossing site at Kiseli, which was not overcome until the 30th Guards Rifle Division finally took Liady on October 8. The 15th Guards Rifle Corps was also able to commit the 85th Guards Rifle Division from reserve to break through the river line.

At this point, the 19th Guards Corps finally crossed the river and joined the pursuit, which led to the eastern approaches to Dubrovno, 15 km east of Orsha, by the end of October 11. After a fast regrouping by the 10th Guards Army, the offensive was resumed the next day, with the 22nd Guards leading the Corps on the left flank. Following an 85-minute artillery preparation, that division began the attack but almost immediately stalled due to the ineffectiveness of the artillery and armor. Ongoing assaults up to the 18th produced minor advances at considerable cost.

General Sokolovsky then ordered another regrouping, during which the 19th Guards Corps moved northward to take up the Ozery-Shcheki (Sheki) sector along the Verkheta River, north of the Smolensk-Orsha road. The 65th Guards divisional history recorded:

The division turned its sector over to the 62nd and 63rd Rifle Divisions on the night of 20 October and, after marching along the route from Liady through Klimenki, Kransyi, Skvortsy, and Blashkino, arrived in the Sharino region on the following day. The division relieved units of the 359th Rifle Division during the night of 23 October and occupied jumping-off positions for an offensive along the Sheki, Skulaty and Tkhorino front.

The offensive was renewed on the morning of October 21, following an artillery preparation that lasted two hours and ten minutes. The 197th Infantry Division was struck by the divisions of the 31st Army, which advanced as much as 4 km deep, and were reinforced on the right the next day by the 65th Guards. However, the advance that day was considerably less, in part due to heavy German artillery fire and the inability to reply on the Soviet side due to shell shortages.

The 332nd and 181st Infantry Regiments... were defending positions in front of the 65th Guards Rifle Division. The first positions in the enemy's defensive belt consisted of three dense trenches with communications trenches, pillboxes, antitank and antipersonnel minefields, and two to three lines of barbed wire entanglements. The Siberians had to assault such a strong defensive position.

The main attack was made on the left flank, directed at height marker 148.8, Petriki and Zapole. The division pushed back the 181st Regiment from its positions by October 25, forcing it to withdraw to prepared positions from Shera to Kireeva. However, further attempts to develop the offensive failed, and the division was ordered to defend before being relieved by the 22nd Guards on November 5. While the remainder of the 10th Guards Army cleared German defenders from the bogs south of the Verkheta, this was also at considerable cost, and a halt was called once again at the end of October 26. In the course of five days of fighting, the 10th Guards and 31st Armies together suffered 19,102 casualties, including 4,787 killed.

A third offensive on Orsha began on November 14. The 10th Guards Army was again called upon to form part of the strike group, which was concentrated on both sides of the Orsha-Smolensk highway. The plan for the offensive differed little from the previous ones. The 10th Guards and 31st Armies were to provide a shock group to assault on both sides of the highway north of the Dniepr River, and were to be supported by the 2nd Guards Tank Corps. This effort did not directly involve the 65th Guards until the night of November 20, when it relieved the 56th Guards and 207th Rifle Divisions in the face of the 197th Infantry and 78th Assault Divisions.

During the following seven days of combat, the division made scant progress before being relieved by the 653rd Regiment of the 220th Rifle Division. On December 5, Sokolovsky decided to cease offensive operations and withdraw the 10th Guards Army into reserve. The Army was transferred to the reserves of the 2nd Baltic Front in the Velikiye Luki region. This transfer, which began on December 8, involved the movement of 43,250 soldiers, 1,700 vehicles, and 6,500 horses, as the Army was still dependent on horse-drawn transport. This approximately 210 km move was not completed until December 31. During its course, the 19th Guards Corps received approximately half of 10,500 new replacements, which were split with the 7th Guards Rifle Corps. A large percentage of those received by the 65th Guards were of Latvian nationality, and over the following months, the division gradually lost its Siberian identity, becoming known unofficially as one of the "Latvian Guards" divisions.

== Baltic Offensive ==
The 10th Guards Army was deployed into the salient northwest of Nevel and south of Pustoshka, between the 3rd and 4th Shock Armies, to help eliminate the German-held salient north of Nevel with its base at Novosokolniki. However, its deployment was delayed by the need to replenish its forces, while Army Group North surprised the Soviet command by beginning a phased withdrawal from the salient on December 29, which was completed six days later.

During the late winter, the 10th Guards Army gradually advanced north of Pustoshka towards Novorzhev. On April 4, 1944, Colonel Dmitriev left command of the division, but was not replaced until May 15. Maj. Gen. Mikhail Fedorovich Andriushchenko, former commander of the 98th Rifle Corps, was brought in to take over; he would remain in this position until the division was disbanded. As of July 1, the 65th was facing the defenses of the Panther Line south of Novorzhev. One month later, the division had advanced well to the west and crossed the border into Latvia in the vicinity of Kārsava. The pace of the advance slowed over the next six weeks, and by mid-September, the 19th Guards Corps was located near Lubāna and Gulbene. In the first days of October, the division was north of the Daugava River on the approaches to Riga near Ogre. One week later, the division received its only battle honor:

RIGA... 65th Guards Rifle Division (Major General Andriushchenko, Mikhail Fedorovich)... The troops who participated in the liberation of Riga, by the order of the Supreme High Command of October 13, 1944, and a commendation in Moscow, are given a salute of 24 artillery salvoes from 324 guns.

Following the battle for Riga, the 10th Guards Army was part of the forces of the 2nd Baltic Front that were blockading the former Army Group North in the Kurland Peninsula of Latvia. In March, it was transferred to the Leningrad Front as part of the Kurland Group of Forces, where it remained for the duration.

Postwar, the 65th Guards was withdrawn to Estonia by October 1, 1945, as part of the 19th Guards Rifle Corps. It was disbanded there between August 1, 1946, and 1947.
