= 56th Guards Rifle Division =

56th Guards Rifle Division (June 4, 1943 – 1947)
- Active: 1943–1947
- Country: Soviet Union
- Branch: Red Army
- Type: Division
- Role: Infantry
- Engagements: Battle of Smolensk (1943); Orsha Offensives (1943); Battle of Nevel (1943); Pskov-Ostrov Offensive; Baltic Offensive; Riga Offensive (1944); Courland Pocket
- Decorations: Order of the Red Banner
- Battle honours: Smolensk

Commanders
- Notable commanders: Maj. Gen. Anatolii Ivanovich Kolobutin; Col. Fyodor Pavlovich Boyko; Col. Ivan Filatovich Krovyakov

The 56th Guards Rifle Division was formed as an elite infantry division of the Red Army in June 1943, based on the 2nd formations of the 74th and 91st Rifle Brigades, and served in that role until after the end of the Great Patriotic War. Along with its "sister", the 65th Guards Rifle Division, the 56th was formed "out of sequence", that is, many Guards rifle divisions were higher numbered and formed earlier than the 56th. The division was immediately assigned to the 19th Guards Rifle Corps of the 10th Guards Army and remained under those headquarters for the duration of the war. It first saw action in Western Front's summer offensive, Operation Suvorov. On September 8 the 254th Guards Rifle Regiment was given the honorific title "in the name of Aleksandr Matrosov" and on September 25 the division as a whole was awarded the honorific "Smolensk" for its role in the liberation of that city. During the winter of 1943-44 it took part in the stubborn fighting north and east of Vitebsk, first in Western and later in 2nd Baltic Front. During the following summer offensives it helped break through the defenses of the German Panther Line and advanced into the Baltic states, eventually being decorated with the Order of the Red Banner after the liberation of Riga. For the rest of the war it was part of the forces blockading the remnants of German Army Group North in the Courland Pocket in Latvia, eventually in Leningrad Front. After the war the 56th Guards was moved to the town of Elva in Estonia where it was disbanded in 1947, although the successor formations of the 254th Guards Regiment exist into the present day.

== Preceding Formations ==
The 56th Guards was formed on the basis of two rifle brigades which had been part of the 6th "Stalin Siberian Volunteer" Rifle Corps (later redesignated as the 19th Guards Rifle Corps).

=== 74th Rifle Brigade ===
The 2nd formation of this brigade took place at Barnaul in July 1942 by redesignating the 1st Special Siberian-Altaian Volunteer Brigade in the Siberian Military District. Its order of battle consisted of:

- 1st, 2nd, 3rd, and 4th Rifle Battalions, each with:
  - 3 rifle companies (180-200 men each)
  - 1 submachine gun platoon (30 men)
  - 1 antitank rifle platoon (30 men)
  - 1 machine gun platoon (4 HMGs)
- Artillery Battalion (12 76mm cannon)
- Antitank Battalion (18 57mm guns)
- 120mm Mortar Battalion
- Submachine Gun Battalion
- 82mm Mortar Battery

When formed from Siberian militia volunteers it had, on August 31, 5,804 personnel, of whom 31.4 percent were Communist Party members or Komsomols. It was soon assigned to the 6th Rifle Corps and sent under that command to the Kalinin area of the Moscow Military District. By November 1 the Corps had been assigned to the 22nd Army of Kalinin Front facing the western side of the German-held Rzhev salient.

=== 91st Rifle Brigade ===
This brigade formed for the second time in late August 1942 by redesignating the 4th Siberian Volunteer Brigade in the Siberian Military District. Once formed its order of battle was identical to that of the 74th Brigade. Like the latter it was assigned to the 6th Rifle Corps, along with two other Siberian volunteer brigades and the 150th Rifle Division, and was moved to the 41st Army prior to the start of Operation Mars.

==== Operation Mars ====
In the plan for this offensive the 6th Rifle Corps, commanded by Maj. Gen. S. I. Povetkin, was to penetrate the German front south of Bely to provide a passage into the German rear for the 1st Mechanized Corps. The 150th Division and the 75th and 74th Rifle Brigades were in the first echelon, with the 78th and 91st Brigades in the second. The offensive began on November 25 and the 74th Brigade, commanded by Col. I. P. Repin and supported by companies of the 65th Tank Brigade, soon routed elements of the 2nd Luftwaffe Field Division from two strongpoints and continued to advance. The next day these rifle and tank brigades continued to push forward towards Bykovo. However, by November 27 German reserves were arriving and the 91st Brigade was alerted for commitment. By December 1 it was deep within 41st Army's salient, southeast of Bely, while 74th Brigade was holding its positions in the face of counterattacks by the 20th Panzer Division. Early on December 4 the 41st Army went over to the defense and the 74th Brigade was ordered to help cover the gap between the 1st Mechanized Corps and the 17th Guards Rifle Division. During December 5-6 the German forces encircled most of 41st Army south of Bely, including by December 7 the 91st and 74th Brigades.

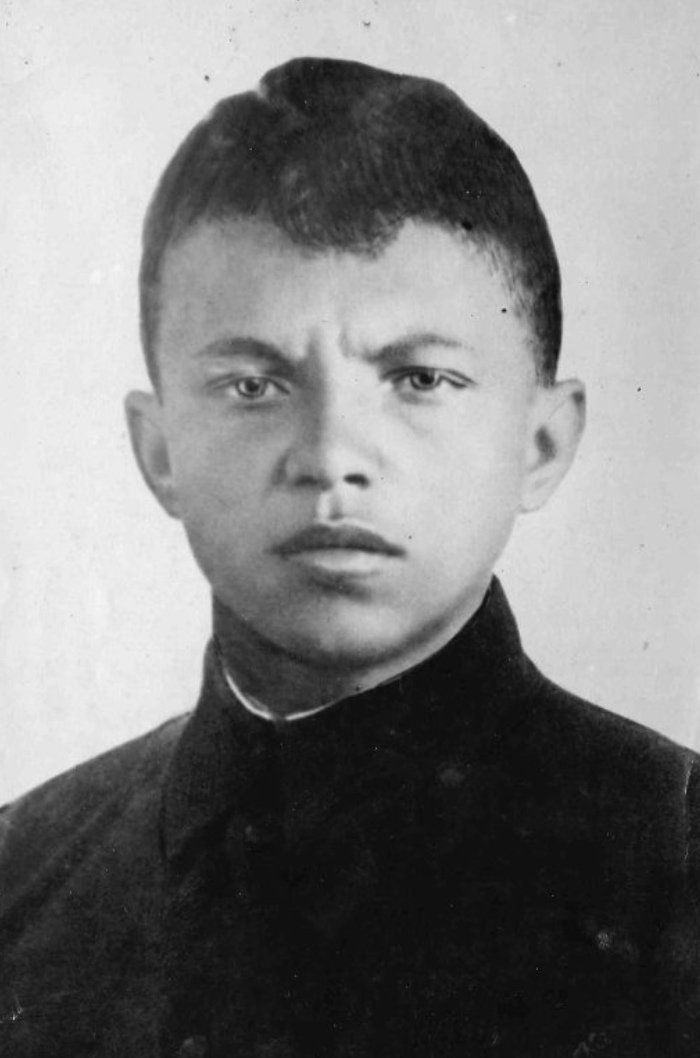
A. M. Matrosov, Hero of the Soviet Union

The encircled force was authorized to break out on the night of December 15/16. The 74th Brigade formed part of the first echelon while the 91st was left to help hold the perimeter before withdrawing through the corridor to the positions of 41st Army. In a German after-action report both brigades were said to have been destroyed. However, in a report at the time of the breakout the 91st Brigade recorded an infantry strength of about 2,800 men. During February 1943 the 6th Rifle Corps returned to the 22nd Army. On February 27 the 2nd Battalion of the 91st Brigade was tasked with attacking a German stronghold near the village of Pleten. Two machine gun bunkers were knocked out, but a third continued to hold up the assault. Krasnoarmeets Aleksandr Matveyevich Matrosov, a 19-year-old volunteer, crept forward to the flank of the bunker and threw two grenades through its embrasure, which appeared to silence it. But when Matrosov's comrades resumed their attack the German gun began firing again. Matrosov then blocked the embrasure with his body and was killed, allowing the attack to continue. While similar feats had occurred previously and would continue, Matrosov's sacrifice was written up by an attached journalist and soon became news across the USSR. He was posthumously made a Hero of the Soviet Union on June 19 and the 254th Guards Rifle Regiment, which was mostly made up of men of the 91st Brigade, was soon given his name as an honorific.

By the beginning of March the 6th Rifle Corps had been withdrawn to the reserves of Kalinin Front. Later that month it returned to 22nd Army but did not remain with that Army when it was transferred to Northwestern Front in April. Instead the 74th and 91st Brigades were moved to the Gzhatsk area where under STAVKA order No. org/2/133681 April 19 they were merged to form the 56th Guards Rifle Division in the redesignated 19th Guards Rifle Corps. By June 1 the Corps had joined the former 30th Army of Western Front, now redesignated as the 10th Guards Army; the Corps also contained the 22nd and 65th Guards Rifle Divisions.

== Formation ==
The 56th Guards officially received its Guards title on June 4. The division's order of battle was as follows:

- 254th Guards Rifle Regiment
- 256th Guards Rifle Regiment
- 258th Guards Rifle Regiment
- 187th Guards Artillery Regiment
- 91st Guards Antitank Battalion
- 87th Guards Reconnaissance Company
- 97th Guards Sapper Battalion
- 117th Guards Signal Company
- 92nd Guards Medical/Sanitation Battalion
- 88th Guards Chemical Defense (Anti-gas) Company
- 90th Guards Motor Transport Company
- 86th Guards Field Bakery
- 84th Guards Divisional Veterinary Hospital
- 2061st Field Postal Station
- 1221st Field Office of the State Bank

Col. Anatolii Ivanovich Kolobutin was appointed to command on the same day; he had previously commanded the 29th Rifle Division. The division spent the next two months working up before the start of the Western Front's summer offensive on August 7.

== Operation Suvorov ==
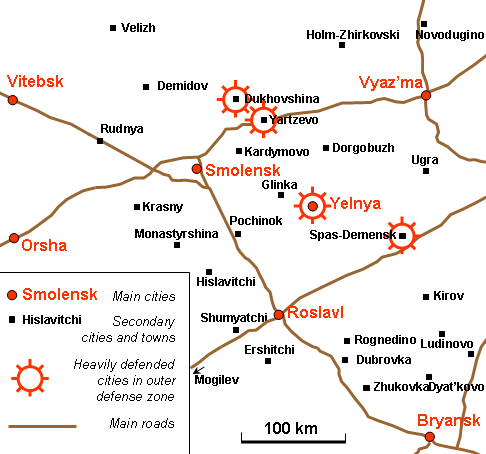
General layout of the Smolensk region during the battle.

The Front's main effort was made between Yelnya and Spas-Demensk by 10th Guards and 33rd Armies. The 10th Guards' 15th and 19th Guards Corps were deployed on a 10km-wide sector between Mazovo and Sluzna; the 56th and 65th Guards Divisions were in the first echelon with the 22nd Guards in the second. Each division had about 8,000 personnel on strength. The 5th Mechanized Corps was assembled behind the Army, ready to exploit the expected breakthrough. The operational objective for the first day of the offensive was the town of Pavlinovo situated on the Smolensk - Spas-Demensk railway, 10km to the south. The German defense in this sector was based on the Büffel-Stellung position, held by XII Army Corps. That Corps' 260th and 268th Infantry Divisions had both been reduced to just two infantry regiments and held very wide sectors, but the terrain was heavily wooded and dotted with numerous fortified villages. Furthermore, two key German positions at Gnezdilovo and nearby Hill 233.3 had not been identified by Soviet intelligence and so escaped the preparatory bombardment.

That bombardment began at 0440 hours and continued until 0630, consuming more than 50 percent of Western Front's available ammunition. Shortly after crossing the start line the 56th and 65th Guards ran into heavy resistance from the 499th Regiment of the 268th Infantry. That Division's artillery broke up the assault groups before they could make any progress while a pair of German assault guns picked off advancing T-34s of the supporting 119th Tank Regiment. However, here and there some small detachments found a way through. The 56th managed to carve out a 1km-deep penetration near Kamenka but it was soon evident that 19th Guards Corps had been stopped cold. The 15th Guards Corps made somewhat greater progress against the portion of the 499th Regiment that it faced. By the early afternoon the commander of Western Front, Col. Gen. V. D. Sokolovsky, was already making command changes and committing additional forces; these decisions were questionable, but did force a decision at Kamenka where a German battalion was overrun. During the rest of the afternoon the 10th Guards Army's infantry gradually outflanked the remaining strongpoints of the 499th Regiment and once night fell the 268th Infantry was authorized to pull back 2-3km to form a new line. Meanwhile, a battlegroup of the 2nd Panzer Division, de-training near Yelnya, was ordered to march to support that Division.

The offensive resumed at 0730 hours on August 8 after a 30-minute artillery preparation. The 65th Guards, now reinforced by the 22nd Guards, remained stymied in front of Hill 233.3, held by a single German battalion. However the two German divisions were being drained by steady losses. The Hill was not finally taken until the evening of August 10. A few hours earlier the 56th Guards, now supported by the 249th Tank Regiment, had captured the village of Delyagino, causing the German forces to retreat 2km to the south. These gains unhinged the Büffel-Stellung and allowed 10th Guards Army to finally reach the Smolensk - Spas-Demensk railway; the XII Corps was now forced to trade space for time until Sokolovsky's offensive outran its logistical support. Western Front's artillery had already shot off almost all of its available ammunition.

On August 12 the 10th Guards Army made another major push and liberated Gnezdilovo. Despite German reinforcements by late afternoon XII Corps' front was crumbling and Soviet infantry and tanks were approaching Pavlinovo. Under the circumstances the Corps was ordered to evacuate Spas-Demensk overnight. By August 14 Sokolovsky brought the 21st Army into the 10th Guards Army's sector, allowing the latter to pull back for rest and rebuilding. On August 21 the STAVKA authorized a suspension of the offensive. German losses had been heavy, but the 10th Guards Army had also lost 30 percent casualties, although the 65th Guards had suffered the most.

=== The Liberation of Yelnya ===
The offensive was renewed on August 28, with the 10th Guards, 21st, 33rd and 68th Armies in the center of the Front making the main attack. The objective was to finally shatter the XII Army Corps and then push mobile groups through the gaps to seize Yelnya. At 0800 hours the Front began a 90-minute artillery preparation across a 25-km wide front southeast of that city. 10th Guards and 21st Armies attacked a German battlegroup around Terenino station, held by one infantry battalion and an engineer unit. German reserves were brought in and the battle see-sawed for about eight hours until the German battlegroup fell apart and began retreating to the Ugra River. In total the two Soviet armies advanced from 6 to 8km. The next day the 10th Guards mopped up the German elements that had failed to make it over the Ugra and began pushing up the rail line toward Yelnaya. Despite intervention by the battlegroup of 2nd Panzer the 10th Guards pushed back the right flank of the 342nd Infantry Division with the 29th Guards Rifle Division and the 119th Tank Regiment in the lead. Yelnya was evacuated during the afternoon and was liberated on August 30.

From here it was only 75km to Smolensk. But by September 3 the German 4th Army had patched up a tenuous new front west of Yelnya. Sokolovsky continued local attacks through the first week of the month but his Western Front was again forced to a halt due to logistical shortages. He was authorized to pause the offensive for another week. It was during this period that the 254th Guards Regiment was granted the honorific title "in the name of Aleksandr Matrosov". During the night of September 14/15 Sokolovsky's center group of armies conducted aggressive probing all along the front of the German IX Army Corps which was holding a 40km-wide line with five decimated divisions; known German positions were also pounded with artillery. At 0545 hours a 90-minute artillery preparation began, followed by an intense air bombardment. The ground attack began at 0715, south of the Smolensk - Yelnya railroad. At 1030 hours the 10th Guards Army struck the left flank of the 330th Infantry Division with a mass of infantry and tanks, pushing back two battalions. The Army, in cooperation with 21st Army, continued attacking into the afternoon, creating several small penetrations and advancing up to 3km.

=== The Liberation of Smolensk ===
Overnight the 330th Infantry made minor withdrawals to straighten its front. On September 16 the 10th Guards Army, now led by 15th Guards Corps, failed to make any substantive gains. However it was clear by the end of the day that IX Corps was close to breaking and during the night it fell back to the next defensive line, which was mostly incomplete. Sokolovsky ordered a pursuit to approach Smolensk from the south with the 10th Guards and 68th Armies and most of his armor. The retreat of the 330th Infantry was covered by the Tiger tanks of heavy Panzer-Abteilung 505. Supply problems forced the Soviet armies to pause for a few days outside Smolensk before making the final push. On the morning of September 22 that push began and 68th Army made a clear breakthrough southeast of the city. Late on the 23rd German 4th Army signalled the evacuation of Smolensk. During the next day the Soviet forces probed the German defenses but did not begin their attacks until nightfall. By 0600 hours on September 25 most of Smolensk was liberated, although much of it was destroyed or damaged. In recognition of its part in this battle the division was awarded a battle honor:

"SMOLENSK"... 56th Guards Rifle Division (Colonel Kolobutin, Anatolii Ivanovich)... The troops who participated in the liberation of Smolensk, by the order of the Supreme High Command of September 25, 1943, and a commendation in Moscow, are given a salute of 20 artillery salvoes from 224 guns.

== Battles for Orsha ==
By October 2, 10th Guards Army had reached a line from Liady southwards along the Mereia River to the town of Baevo. Early on October 3 the Army launched an assault as part of Western Front's offensive on Orsha; the 22nd and 65th Guards Divisions were in the first echelon of 19th Guards Corps with the 56th Guards in the second as the Corps prepared to attack across the river between Kiseli and Kovshichi, facing the boundary of 18th and 25th Panzer Grenadier Divisions. Fierce fighting developed for the crossing site at Kiseli, which was not overcome until 30th Guards Rifle Division finally took Liady on October 8 and 15th Guards Rifle Corps was able to commit 85th Guards Rifle Division from reserve to unhinge the river line. At this point the 19th Guards Corps finally crossed the river and joined the pursuit, which led to the eastern approaches to Dubrovno, 15km east of Orsha, by the end of October 11. After a fast regrouping by 10th Guards Army the offensive was resumed the next day with the 22nd Guards leading the Corps on the left flank. Following an 85-minute artillery preparation that division stepped off, but almost immediately stalled due to the ineffectiveness of the artillery and armor. Ongoing assaults up to the 18th produced meager advances at considerable cost.

Sokolovsky then ordered another regrouping during which the 19th Guards Corps moved northward to take up the Ozery-Shcheki sector along the Verkheta River north of the Smolensk-Orsha road. The offensive was renewed on the morning of October 21, following a two-hour-and-ten-minute artillery preparation. The 197th Infantry Division was struck by the divisions of 31st Army which advanced as much as 4km deep, and were reinforced on the right the next day by 65th Guards. However, the advance that day was considerably less, in part due to heavy German artillery fire and an inability to reply due to shell shortages on the Soviet side. While the remainder of 10th Guards Army cleared German defenders from the bogs south of the Verkheta, this was also at considerable cost, and a halt was called once again at the end of October 26.

A third offensive on Orsha began on November 14. The 10th Guards Army was again called upon to form part of the strike group which was concentrated on both sides of the Orsha-Smolensk highway. The plan for the offensive differed little from those previous. 10th Guards and 31st Armies were to provide a shock group to assault on both sides of the highway north of the Dniepr River, and were to be supported by the 2nd Guards Tank Corps. The Soviet force faced elements of two infantry and two panzer-grenadier divisions of the XXVII Army Corps. As recounted from the history of the 10th Guards Army:

The 56th, 85th, and 30th Guards Rifle Divisions attacked the enemy after an artillery and aviation preparation. They captured the first trenches by an audacious dash, but an antitank ditch up to 6 metres wide and 4 metres deep obstructed the attackers' subsequent advance route. It was so well concealed that even one close to it could not discover it... Our units managed to overcome that obstacle and capture the second trenches only by 1500 hours... The prolonged battles continued during the second half on November and in the beginning of December 1943. Overall our forces advanced from 6 up to 8 kilometres from 14 November through 5 December. In the light of the hopelessness of any further attempts to smash the enemy resistance on the approaches to Orsha, on 5 December the Western Front commander decided to cease offensive operations and withdraw 10th Guards Army into reserve.

The Army was transferred to the reserves of the 2nd Baltic Front in the Velikiye Luki region. This transfer, which began on December 8, involved the movement of 43,250 soldiers, 1,700 vehicles, and 6,500 horses, since the Army was still dependent on quite a lot of horse-drawn transport. This move of about 210km was not completed until December 31. During its course the 19th Guards Corps received about half of 10,500 new replacements which were split with 7th Guards Rifle Corps.

== Baltic Offensive ==
The 10th Guards Army was deployed into the salient northwest of Nevel and south of Pustoshka, between the 3rd and 4th Shock Armies, with the intention of helping to eliminate the German-held salient north of Nevel with its base at Novosokolniki. However, its deployment was delayed by the need to replenish its forces, while Army Group North surprised the Soviet command by beginning a phased withdrawal from the salient on December 29, which was completed six days later.

During the late winter 10th Guards Army gradually advanced north of Pustoshka towards Novorzhev. As of July 1, 1944 the 56th was facing the defenses of the Panther Line just north of the latter town. One month later the division had advanced well to the west and had crossed the border into Latvia in the vicinity of Kārsava. The pace of the advance slowed over the next six weeks and by mid-September the 19th Guards Corps was located near Lubāna and Gulbene. In the first days of October the division was north of the Daugava River on the approaches to Riga near Ogre. On November 3 the 56th Guards was decorated with the Order of the Red Banner for its part in the liberation of the Latvian capital.

On October 30 Colonel Kolobutin had been transferred to command of the 119th Guards Rifle Division in 7th Guards Rifle Corps and was replaced by Col. Fyodor Pavlovich Boyko. This officer was reassigned two months later and on January 13, 1945 Col. Ivan Filatovich Krovyakov took over the command, which he held for the duration of the war. By now the 10th Guards Army was part of the forces of 2nd Baltic Front that were blockading the former Army Group North in the Kurland Peninsula of Latvia. In March it was transferred to Leningrad Front as part of the Kurland Group of Forces, where it remained for the duration.

== Postwar ==
When the fighting ended the men and women of the division shared the full title: 56th Guards Rifle, Smolensk, Order of the Red Banner Division. (Russian: 56-я гвардейская стрелковая Смоленская Краснознамённая дивизия.) On June 6 Kolobutin, now holding the rank of major general, returned to its command. The division was soon relocated to Elva in Estonia with the 19th Guards Corps and in 1947 was mostly disbanded, although the 254th Guards Regiment, owing to its Matrosov honorific, was retained as part of the 36th Guards Mechanized Division. In June 1957 the regiment was reorganized as the 254th Guards Motor Rifle Regiment of the 36th Guards Motor Rifle Division, which became the 8th Guards Motor Rifle Division in 1960. In 1994 the regiment was moved to Yelnya and disbanded. In February 2004 the 752nd Motor Rifle Regiment of the 3rd Motor Rifle Division, stationed at Nizhni Novgorod, was redesignated as the 254th Guards, again with the Matrosov honorific, but was later converted to the 9th Separate Motorized Rifle Brigade, which was disbanded in 2010. In 2018 a new 254th Motor Rifle Regiment of the 144th Guards Motorized Infantry Division was deployed near Bryansk; in 2020 it will be awarded the honorary names "Guards" and "in the name of Alexander Matrosov".
