= 30th Guards Rifle Division =

30th Guards Rifle Division (May 24, 1942 – July 1946)
- Active: 1942–1946
- Country: Soviet Union
- Branch: Red Army / Soviet Army
- Type: Division
- Role: Infantry
- Engagements: World War II; Battles of Rzhev; First Rzhev–Sychyovka Offensive Operation; Operation Mars; Rzhev-Vyazma Offensive; Battle of Smolensk; Orsha Offensives; Battle of Nevel; Pskov-Ostrov Offensive; Baltic Offensive; Riga Offensive; Courland Pocket
- Decorations: Order of the Red Banner
- Battle honours: Riga

Commanders
- Notable commanders: Maj. Gen. Andrei Danilovich Kuleshov; Maj. Gen. Mikhail Aleksandrovich Isaev; Lt. Col. Ivan Anisimovich Fadeikin

The 30th Guards Rifle Division was reformed as an elite infantry division of the Red Army in May, 1942, based on the 1st formation of the 238th Rifle Division, and served in that role until after the end of the Great Patriotic War. It would soon after help provide the headquarters cadre for the 7th Guards Rifle Corps along with its "sister" 29th Guards Rifle Division. However, it was not assigned as a unit to the Corps until August when it joined 33rd Army of Western Front and saw extensive fighting, while also suffering extensive casualties, in the summer campaign against the German 3rd Panzer Army in the southern sector of the Rzhev salient. After leaving 7th Guards Corps the division was reassigned to several other armies in the Front until April, 1943 when it joined the 15th Guards Rifle Corps in 30th Army, which became 10th Guards Army the next month; it would remain under these commands for the duration of the war. The division took part in Operation Suvorov, Western Front's summer offensive towards Smolensk, and after the liberation of that city was involved in several unsuccessful drives on the Belarusian city of Orsha. By December the 30th Guards had been redeployed to 2nd Baltic Front and during the summer and fall of 1944 it took part in the offensives through the Baltic states, winning a battle honor for its part in the liberation of Riga. For the rest of the war the division remained in Latvia helping to contain the German forces trapped in the Courland Peninsula, eventually coming under command of Leningrad Front. In mid-1946 it was converted to the 30th Separate Guards Rifle Brigade.

== Formation ==
The 238th had been originally formed on March 14, 1941 at Alma-Ata, Kazakhstan in the Central Asia Military District, based on the 499th Reserve Rifle Regiment, and so began with personnel mostly of Kazakh nationality. On May 3, 1942 it was awarded the Order of the Red Banner in recognition of its leading role in taking the town of Aleksin from German 4th Army during the counteroffensive in front of Moscow and later the liberation of Kaluga. On May 24 it was further distinguished by being raised to Guards status. After the subunits received their redesignations on June 20 the division's order of battle was as follows:

- 94th Guards Rifle Regiment (from 830th Rifle Regiment)
- 96th Guards Rifle Regiment (from 837th Rifle Regiment)
- 98th Guards Rifle Regiment (from 843rd Rifle Regiment)
- 63rd Guards Artillery Regiment (from 137th Artillery Regiment)
- 35th Guards Antitank Battalion (from 144th Antitank Battalion)
- 34th Guards Antiaircraft Battery (until April 1, 1943)
- 33rd Guards Mortar Battalion (until October 20, 1942)
- 32nd Guards Reconnaissance Company
- 33rd Guards Sapper Battalion
- 42nd Guards Signal Battalion
- 29th Guards Medical/Sanitation Battalion (from 499th Medical/Sanitation Battalion)
- 31st Guards Chemical Defense (Anti-gas) Company
- 28th Guards Motor Transport Company (from 579th Motor Transport Company)
- 38th Guards Field Bakery (from 623rd Field Bakery)
- 28th Guards Divisional Veterinary Hospital (from 611th Divisional Veterinary Hospital)
- 690th Field Postal Station
- 563rd Field Office of the State Bank

Col. Andrei Danilovich Kuleshov remained in command of the division after redesignation; he would be promoted to the rank of major general on November 27. At this time the division was under command of the 49th Army in Western Front. It remained in this Army until August when it was reassigned to the 7th Guards Rifle Corps, along with 5th Guards and 17th Rifle Divisions, in 33rd Army.

== Battles of Rzhev ==
In the planning for Western Front's summer offensive against the eastern face of the Rzhev salient at least one map-solution was prepared in June for a prospective offensive by 49th, 33rd and 5th Armies to seize Vyasma, although this came to nothing. As the planning continued 33rd Army was also considered for advances in the direction of Gzhatsk and west of Medyn. In the end the Army was to be given a large role in the offensive. When the Army joined the offensive on August 13 it faced six German infantry regiments along the front line on its breakthrough sector but had only a 3.5:1 advantage in infantry and 1.6:1 in artillery, considerably less than the other Soviet armies involved, apart from 30th Army on the opposite end of the offensive front. Given this relative weakness in force correlation and the fact that the main offensive had begun more than a week earlier, eliminating any element of surprise, the attack of 7th Guards Corps and the rest of 33rd Army soon faltered.

The Army resumed its offensive on August 24 and made some penetrations on 3rd Panzer's front, but these were soon contained. Another effort began on September 4 in conjunction with 5th Army, but was halted three days later. During this period 20th Army was also attempting to reach Gzhatsk but went over to the defense on September 8. For the rest of the month the southern armies of the Front were officially engaged in "battles of local significance". From August 10 to September 15 the personnel losses of 33rd Army are listed as 42,327 killed, wounded and missing while gaining from 20–25 km to the west and northwest. The heavy losses were attributed to "densely-packed formations... [while] there was almost no coordination between fire and maneuver..." among other factors. Later in September the 30th Guards left 7th Guards Corps to become a separate division, still in 33rd Army, but in November it was moved to the adjacent 5th Army, joining its "sister" 29th Guards in preparation for a new offensive against the salient.

=== Operation Mars ===
In planning for this offensive Army Gen. G. K. Zhukov conceived a two-phase operation beginning against the northern part of the salient to be known as Operation Mars, with a subsequent phase to the south likely under the name of Operation Jupiter. During October and November the German 9th Army noted a Soviet buildup in the sector east of Vyasma, including the 3rd Tank Army, two tank corps, and reinforcements for 5th Army, including 30th Guards. 33rd Army would also take part. Due to postponements Mars did not begin until November 25, at which time the start date for the second phase was tentatively set for December 1. By then Mars was badly bogged down and although Zhukov continued to hope Jupiter could be implemented as late as December 9, on the 16th Stalin ordered the 3rd Tank Army to move south. Earlier in the month the division was moved to 20th Army as Zhukov tried desperately to revive Mars. On the morning of December 11 it attacked with the 415th and 243rd Rifle Divisions on the Bolshoi Kropotovo - Podosinovka sector of the Vazuza bridgehead; this force advanced from 500 - 1,000m but was unable to take any of the fortified villages. The offensive was finally halted on the 14th. Up to December 18 the 30th Guards suffered 652 killed, 1,768 wounded and 170 missing-in-action for this negligible gain.

=== Rzhev-Vyazma Offensive ===
The division remained in 20th Army until February when it was transferred north to 31st Army. It was under this command when 9th Army began its evacuation of the salient at 0300 hours on March 2. 31st Army was the first to go on the pursuit and soon seized the first line of German trenches but then ran into serious resistance. The next morning it was ordered to alter its direction of advance to the south and southwest. On March 8 elements of the Army liberated Sychyovka. The rate of pursuit was generally slow due to strong rearguards, deteriorating weather and the German scorched-earth policy. The official history of the Army states:

"While developing the successes achieved, the 88th and 42nd Guards Rifle Divisions captured the regional center of Izdeshkovo on 18 March and, together with the 118th and 30th Guards Rifle Divisions, reached the eastern bank of the Dnepr River. The entire army forced the river on 20 March and advanced 20-25 kilometres toward the southwest."

This history further recounts the difficulties encountered due to the spring rasputitsa, German demolitions, and other obstacles. On March 22 three divisions of the Army attacked the prepared positions of the 337th Infantry Division at the base of the former salient but were soon brought to a standstill.

== Into Western Russia ==
In April the division was reassigned to 30th Army, where it joined the 85th Guards Rifle Division to comprise the 15th Guards Rifle Corps. In May, 30th Army was redesignated as 10th Guards Army; the 30th Guards would remain under the command of that Corps and Army for the duration of the war. The 10th Guards Army, still in Western Front, did not see much action until the start of Operation Suvorov, the summer offensive towards Smolensk. This offensive would be conducted primarily against the German 4th Army. On August 6 the 5th, 33rd and 10th Guards armies began a reconnaissance-in-force. As a first echelon division the 30th Guards committed a battalion, reinforced with a few tanks and backed by artillery, to advance into the German security zone, which was 2–3 km deep and held by platoon-sized outposts. German resistance proved stiff and gave up little ground; much of the German fire plan was uncovered but at the cost of any remaining tactical surprise. The main attack began the next morning at 0440 hours with an artillery preparation lasting just under two hours. 10th Guards and 33rd armies made the main effort between Yelnya and Spas-Demensk. 10th Guards was on the right, closer to Yelnya, with the 15th and 19th Guards Rifle Corps on a 10 km-wide sector between Mazovo and Sluzna. The 5th Mechanized Corps was behind the Army, ready to exploit the expected breakthrough. The German defense rested on the positions that had been built at the base of the Rzhev salient, and were occupied by the XII Army Corps.

=== Operation Suvorov ===
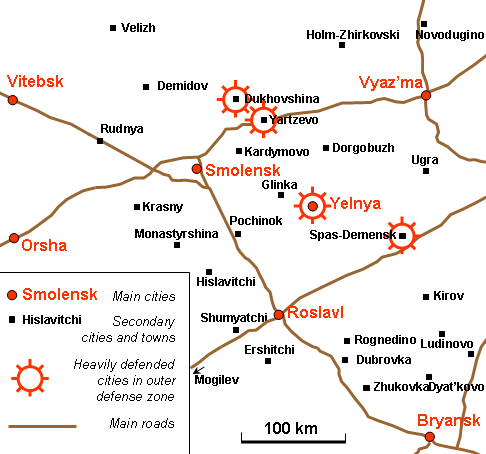
General layout of Smolensk region during the operation.

The infantry assault began at 0630 hours. The 19th Guards Corps encountered heavy resistance, particularly from German divisional artillery, and was soon stopped cold. 15th Guards Corps, on the other hand, went into the attack some time later and began slowly pushing back the 499th Regiment of the 268th Infantry Division. By the early afternoon the Front commander, Col. Gen. V. D. Sokolovskii, was becoming concerned about the inability of most of his units to advance. He therefore committed part of his reserve 68th Army to reinforce 10th Guards Army. While this was a questionable decision on some levels, it did lead to a battalion of the 499th Regiment being overrun near Kamenka. Overall the German position on this first day remained tenable because the offensive was a series of localized attacks rather an all-out effort to overwhelm 4th Army. The operation resumed at 0730 hours on August 8 after a 30-minute artillery preparation, but 19th Guards Corps continued to be held up by what amounted to a battalion. Over the next three days the reinforced 10th Guards tried repeatedly to smash through the lines of XII Corps, particularly at Hill 233.3, as Army Group Center kept feeding in reinforcements from 9th Army to plug the weak spots. Finally, with the help of 33rd Army, the German position was overcome and their forces began towards the Yelnya - Spas-Demensk railway late on August 11. However, by now Western Front had expended almost all of its artillery ammunition.

By the end of the next day lead elements of 10th Guards Army were approaching Pavlinovo and some had already reached the rail line. XII Corps was on the verge of collapse, but the Front's mobile reserve had already been committed elsewhere. Spas-Demensk was evacuated overnight. Suvorov continued to go forward at a crawl due to deteriorating weather and supply shortages until it was suspended on August 21. Sokolovskii had been ordered to renew the drive by August 28 and it began at 0800 hours with a 90-minute artillery preparation across a 25 km-wide front southeast of Yelnya on the sectors of 10th Guards, 33rd and 21st Armies. 10th Guards and 21st Army attacked towards Terenino station against Battle Group Vincenz which contested the advance for about eight hours before it was shattered and began falling back to the Ugra River. Overall, Western Front advanced 6–8 km during the day. On the 29th the 10th Guards mopped up the German remnants that had not made it over the Ugra before boldly pushing up the rail line towards Yelnya. On August 30 the Army continued to make good progress, pushing back the 342nd Infantry Division with the 29th Guards Division and 119th Tank Regiment in the lead. By 1700 hours Soviet infantry and tanks were attacking into the town and within two hours Yelnya was liberated. From here it was only 75 km to Smolensk.

However, despite the German 4th Army being in dire straits, Sokolovskii's forces were again nearly out of fuel and ammunition; in addition nine of his rifle divisions were reduced to 3,000 men or less. On September 7 the STAVKA agreed to another suspension of the offensive. It recommenced at 0545 hours on September 15 with another 90-minute artillery attack against the positions of the IX Army Corps west of Yelnya; the Corps was assigned to hold a 40 km-wide front with five decimated divisions. At 1030 hours the 10th Guards Army struck the left flank of 330th Infantry Division with a mass of infantry and tanks, pushing back two battalions. Through the day several small penetrations were made but at most only 3 km were gained despite the right flank of IX Corps being mauled. The assault resumed the next day at 0630 hours. 15th Guards Corps attacked the northern flank of 342nd Infantry just north of the Yelnya - Smolensk rail line but failed to make any substantive gains. Nevertheless, at 1600 hours on September 16 the 4th Army commander, Col. Gen. G. Heinrici, ordered IX Corps to withdraw to the next defensive line. After detecting the withdrawal, Sokolovskii issued orders for 10th Guards and 68th armies and most of his armor to pursue the left wing of IX Corps and approach Smolensk from the south. The next day Heinrici ordered that the city be prepared for destruction. While the Soviet troops were inspired by the prospect of a major victory at hand they were also nearing exhaustion and again low on supplies; Sokolovskii was forced to call a pause for a few days. The advance resumed on September 22 and Smolensk was liberated three days later. 10th Guards Army played no role in this, having bypassed the city to the south, but was soon pulled out of the line to regroup. 4th Army reached the Panther Line on September 29 and ended its retreat on October 2.

== Orsha Offensives ==
On the same date the lead elements of 10th Guards Army reached positions from Lyady southward along the Mereya River to the town of Baevo. In anticipation of an attack on October 3 the new Army commander, Lt. Gen. A. V. Sukhomlin, deployed his 15th Guards Corps north of 19th Guards Corps in first echelon, with 7th Guards Corps in reserve. 30th Guards Division was to assault the German positions at Lyady, backed by 85th Guards and the 153rd Tank Brigade. The Army's main attack sector was at the boundary between XXVII Army Corps' 18th Panzergrenadier Division and XXXIX Panzer Corps' 25th Panzergrenadier Division. The latter unit would soon be reinforced by infantry of the 1st SS Infantry Brigade. When the attack began as scheduled the division was reinforced by the 662nd and 188th Artillery, 317th Mortar and 132nd Antitank Artillery Regiments and spent four days assaulting the strong German defenses at Lyady before overcoming them on the night of October 8. 15th Guards Corps then committed the 85th Guards from reserve which thrust across the Mereya north or the town. This maneuver, along with the advances of 31st and 68th Armies to the north, forced the two panzergrenadier divisions to begin a fighting withdrawal to the west. 19th Guards Corps soon joined the pursuit. The advance detachments of the Army reached the eastern approaches to Dubrovno, 15 km east of Orsha, by the end of October 11. At this time the 30th and 85th Guards reached the Rossasenka River between the villages of Rusany and Kazarinovo.

Meanwhile the 29th Guards Division had failed to dislodge the 25th Panzergrenadiers near Baevo. As a result the German 4th Army's main defense line along the Pronya River remained intact. The defenses west and northwest of Baevo became Sokolovskii's next logical target. A new offensive was to begin on October 12 led by assault groups formed by five of his armies, including 10th Guards. These were to advance to the west from the region north and south of Baevo toward Orsha on a 15 km-wide penetration sector. General Sukhomlin deployed his Army with the 15th and 19th Guards Corps abreast; 15th Guards Corps was on the right wing with 85th Guards in first echelon and 30th Guards in second. The attack began with an artillery preparation that lasted 85 minutes, but 10th Guards stalled almost immediately with severe losses and no appreciable gains. The assault was renewed the next day after a short artillery fire raid, with the division being committed from second echelon, but with no better results against the German forces defending the villages of Lapyrevshchina and Arvianitsa, several kilometres northwest of Baevo. The fighting continued until October 18 with little to show but heavy Soviet casualties.

Prior to the next offensive the 10th Guards Army was redeployed to just south of the Smolensk - Minsk highway. While this sector was more heavily defended, General Sokolovskii calculated that the presence of the highway and the railway would ease resupply. The Army was reinforced from 5th Army; 15th Guards Corps received a third division, and all the Front's divisions received personnel mobilized from the liberated territories which increased their strength to 4,000-4,500 men each. The 15th and 19th Guards Corps both were deployed with one division in first echelon and the other two in second. While this extensive regrouping produced a powerful shock group astride the highway and to its north and south, it also committed many units to attack on unfamiliar sectors which increased confusion in Soviet ranks. The shock group was backed by 172 tanks and self-propelled guns and substantial artillery. The assault commenced early on October 21 after a two-hour and ten-minute artillery preparation. 31st Army struck the advance positions of the 197th Infantry Division, punched through, and was reinforced by 19th Guards Corps the next day. Over the following days the 10th Guards Army managed to clear the German defenders from the bogs south of the Verkhita River but was finally halted at nightfall on October 26 well short of the rail station at Osintori; Sokolovskii now ordered a suspension of the offensive. 10th Guards and 31st armies had gained just 4–6 km in five days of fighting at a cost of 4,787 killed and 14,315 wounded. Fighting went on well into early November in local attacks and counterattacks to improve tactical positions.

A fourth effort to open the road to Orsha began on November 14. The 30th Guards was facing the 215th Infantry Regiment of the 78th Assault Division, still south of the Smolensk - Minsk highway. The attack began on November 14, following a three-and-one-half hour preparation by artillery and air attacks. A postwar account described the 10th Guards' offensive:

The 56th, 85th, and 30th Guards Rifle Divisions attacked the enemy after an artillery and aviation preparation. They captured the first trenches by an audacious dash, but an antitank ditch up to 6 metres wide and 4 metres deep obstructed the attackers' subsequent attack route... Our units managed to overcome that obstacle and capture the second trenches only by 1500 hours... Mobile detachments had been created in the divisions to exploit success. The detachment formed in 30th Guards Rifle Division consisted of 10 tanks, 4 self-propelled artillery guns, and an infantry battalion from 98th Guards Rifle Regiment. The detachment went into combat at 1600 hours and advanced 3-4 kilometres.

In the face of heavy German counterattacks this proved to be the limit of the initial Soviet advance. General Sukhomlin renewed the attack on November 17 with the 15th Guards Corps, in conjunction with the 70th Rifle Corps of 31st Army and supported by two brigades of 2nd Guards Tank Corps. This split the boundary between the 78th Assault and 25th Panzergrenadiers and finally took the village of Novoe Selo, but again stalled. The battle was prolonged into early December with no more than an additional 4 km being gained. Sokolovskii ceased the offensive on December 5 and withdrew 10th Guards Army into reserve. Later that month it was transferred to 2nd Baltic Front in the Velikiye Luki region; this move began on December 8 and was completed by December 31 after covering 210 km. While the 7th and 19th Guards Corps each received about 5,000 replacements the 15th Guards received none. Sukhomlin requested two to three weeks to train and incorporate these new men, but the Army was ordered to return to action by January 14, 1944.

== Baltic Offensive ==
On January 18 General Kuleshov was moved to the position of deputy chief of staff of 2nd Baltic Front; he would eventually become the commander of 7th Guards Rifle Corps. Col. Mikhail Aleksandrovich Isaev took over command of the division; he would be promoted to the rank of major general on June 3. 10th Guards Army had been deployed into the salient northwest of Nevel and south of Pustoshka, between the 3rd and 4th Shock Armies, with the intention of helping to eliminate the German-held salient north of Nevel with its base at Novosokolniki. However, its deployment was delayed by the need to replenish its forces, while Army Group North surprised the Soviet command by beginning a phased withdrawal from the salient on December 29, which was completed six days later.

During the late winter 10th Guards Army gradually advanced north of Pustoshka towards Novorzhev. As of July 1 the 15th Guards Corps consisted of the 29th, 30th and 85th Guards Divisions, and the 30th was facing the defenses of the Panther Line along the Alolya River due east of Opochka. One month later the division had advanced well west of that city and had crossed the border into Latvia in the vicinity of Kārsava. The pace of the advance slowed over the next six weeks and by mid-September the 15th Guards Corps was located near Lubāna and Gulbene. In the first days of October the division was north of the Daugava River on the approaches to Riga near Ogre. It took part in the battle for the Latvian capital and was awarded its name as an honorific:

"RIGA... 30th Guards Rifle Division (Major General Isaev, Mikhail Aleksandrovich)... The troops who participated in the liberation of Riga, by the order of the Supreme High Command of October 13, 1944, and a commendation in Moscow, are given a salute of 24 artillery salvoes from 324 guns."

Following this victory the division remained in Latvia and Lithuania for the duration of the war. On November 6, General Isaev was given command of 15th Guards Corps and was replaced in command of the division by Lt. Col. Ivan Anisimovich Fadeikin, but on February 17, 1945 Isaev returned to his former command for the duration. As of May 1 the 30th Guards was in the Kurland Group of Leningrad Front, helping to maintain the encirclement of the German forces in the Courland Pocket. It remained in the Baltic states until the next year, when it was converted to the 30th Separate Guards Rifle Brigade.
