= 243rd Rifle Division =

243rd Rifle Division (June 29, 1941 – 1945)
- Active: 1941–1945
- Country: Soviet Union
- Branch: Red Army
- Type: Infantry
- Size: Division
- Engagements: Battle of Smolensk (1941); Battle of Moscow; Battles of Rzhev; Operation Mars; Operation Gallop; Izyum–Barvenkovo offensive Donbas strategic offensive (August 1943); Battle of the Dniepr; Nikopol–Krivoi Rog Offensive; Odessa Offensive; First Jassy–Kishinev Offensive; Second Jassy–Kishinev Offensive; Budapest offensive Siege of Budapest; Bratislava–Brno offensive Soviet invasion of Manchuria
- Decorations: Order of the Red Banner
- Battle honours: Nikopol; Khingan

Commanders
- Notable commanders: Maj. Gen. Fyodor Nazarovich Parkhomenko; Col. Yakov Gavrilovich Tsarkov; Maj. Gen. Vitalii Sergeevich Polenov; Col. Vasilii Kuzmich Guryashin; Maj. Gen. Aleksandr Andreevich Kutsenko; Col. Mitrofan Sergeevich Tkachyov; Col. Nikolai Nikolaevich Parfentev; Col. Mikhail Alekseevich Bushin

The 243rd Rifle Division was the first of a group of 10 regular rifle divisions formed from cadres of NKVD border and internal troops as standard Red Army rifle divisions, very shortly after the German invasion, in the Moscow Military District. It was largely based on what would become the shtat (table of organization and equipment) of July 29, 1941, with several variations. It served as part of 29th Army in the heavy fighting around Smolensk in July and August, then later in the counteroffensive operations around Kalinin, where it helped to clear the first Soviet territory to be permanently liberated. It then saw extensive service in the severe fighting around Rzhev, before being moved south in the winter of 1942-43. During Operation Gallop in February, as part of 3rd Guards Army, it participated in the action that liberated the city of Voroshilovgrad, before attacking into the Donbas during the following summer. In February of 1944 the division was recognized for its role in the liberation of Nikopol, receiving that place name as an honorific, and then was decorated with the Order of the Red Banner after helping to free Odesa. In May it was trapped by German counterattacks in a deep bend on the east bank of the Dniestr River north of Grigoriopol while serving with 5th Shock Army and suffered heavy losses in breaking out to friendly territory. After recovering from this debacle the 243rd advanced into Romania and Hungary, mostly under either 53rd or 7th Guards Armies, and during early 1945 fought through Czechoslovakia; two of its regiments were decorated for their roles in the liberation of Brno just weeks before the German surrender. Along with the rest of 53rd Army it was railed across Siberia to take part in the Soviet offensive against the Japanese forces in Manchuria in August. While the division saw little, if any, actual combat in the far east, it received a second honorific for the sheer accomplishment of advancing through the mountainous terrain. Within months of the Japanese surrender the 243rd was disbanded.

== Formation ==
The 243rd Rifle Division began forming within days of the start of the German invasion on June 29, 1941, at Yaroslavl, in the Moscow Military District. This was based on an NKVD order of that date:

In accordance with a decision of the USSR's government, the NKVD of the USSR is charged with forming fifteen rifle divisions [10 regular and 5 mountain].
1. Lieutenant General I. I. Maslennikov is entrusted with the task of forming fifteen rifle divisions of NKVD forces...
3. Begin forming and deploying the [following] divisions immediately: 243rd Rifle Division, 244th Rifle Division, 246th Rifle Division, 247th Rifle Division, 249th Rifle Division, 250th Rifle Division, 251st Rifle Division, 252nd Rifle Division, 254th Rifle Division, 256th Rifle Division...
4. To form the divisions designated above, assign 1,000 soldiers and non-commissioned officers and 500 command cadre from the NKVD's cadre to each division. Request the Red Army General Staff to provide the remainder of personnel by calling up all categories of soldiers from the reserves.
5. Complete concentrating the NKVD cadre at the formation regions by 17 July 1941...

Although the initial order for its formation came from the NKVD, when it left for the front in early July it was completely under Red Army administration. Its order of battle was as follows:

- 906th Rifle Regiment
- 910th Rifle Regiment
- 912th Rifle Regiment
- 775th Artillery Regiment
- 303rd Antitank Battalion
- 527th Self-propelled Artillery Battalion (from August 9, 1945)
- 324th Reconnaissance Company
- 413th Sapper Battalion
- 665th Signal Battalion (later, 1444th Signal Company)
- 263rd Medical/Sanitation Battalion
- 244th Chemical Defense (Anti-gas) Company
- 273rd Auto Transport Company (later, 466th Auto Transport Battalion)
- 135th Field Bakery (later, 282nd)
- 125th Divisional Veterinary Hospital
- 808th Field Postal Station
- 710th Field Office of the State Bank

Maj. Gen. Fyodor Nazarovich Parkhomenko, an NKVD officer, was appointed to command on July 7, where he would remain until August 15. On July 13 the division was assigned to 30th Army in Reserve Front, and officially reached the fighting front on July 15, but was soon shifted to 29th Army, where it remained through the balance of 1941.

Judging from reports on other NKVD-based divisions, the 243rd was far from complete when it entered combat. The commander of 30th Army, Maj. Gen. V. A. Khomenko, reported on August 5 regarding his 250th and 251st Divisions that they had been required to move up to 350km on foot to their concentration areas and "were taken from their assembly points in the very midst of assembly, and, incomplete, they did not approach being 'knocked together' and went into battle unprepared for combat." In addition, the 251st had only about 400 NKVD cadre soldiers.

== Battle of Smolensk ==
On July 15, the lead elements of 2nd Panzer Group's 29th Motorized Division reached the southern part of Smolensk. Over the following days German pressure mounted against the three armies of Western Front, commanded by Marshal S. K. Timoshenko, which were almost entirely encircled in that region. On July 19 the commander of Reserve Front, Lt. Gen. I. A. Bogdanov, was alerted by the STAVKA to begin preparing an offensive operation with his 29th, 30th and 28th Armies to rescue Timoshenko's force. The 29th, commanded by General Maslennikov, was to advance from the Toropets region toward Velikiye Luki with its 243rd, 256th and 252nd Divisions.

At 2125 hours on July 20, on behalf of the STAVKA, Army Gen. G. K. Zhukov sent a directive to Timoshenko, who was now acting a commander of the Western Direction. Four reserve armies, including the 29th (now designated as "Group Maslennikov"), were to launch attacks toward Dukhovshchina and Smolensk along converging axes. Maslennikov was to attack southward from the Staro-Toropa region toward Demidov, reach Chikhachi and Lake Zhizhitskoye at Artemovo Station line by day's end on July 23, protect the Toropets axis, and dispatch a detachment of up to one battalion to protect the Group's flank in the Knyazhovo region. In the event, at 1000 that day the 243rd was still unloading from trains at Skvortsovo Station, 18km west of Toropets, prior to occupying a line from Dubrovka to Zasenovo, 30-40km southwest of that town. In a further report to the STAVKA at 0800 on July 26 Group Maslennikov was reported as having completed concentrating along the Chikhachi–Lake Zhizhitskoye line, with the division in second echelon, defending the Sementsevo, Ershevo and Ladygovo region. Early the next day Timoshenko reported to Stalin that the offensive had "developed at a slower than desired tempo during the last two days", and stated that Maslennikov had dispatched two divisions to attack the German Yartsevo–Dukhovshchina grouping while also attacking toward Ilyino. However, by July 31 it was clear that this first major counteroffensive in the Smolensk region had failed, although Army Group Center had to commit its last reserves.

Velikiye Luki had fallen to the 19th Panzer Division at nightfall on July 18, but under pressure from forces of 22nd Army was forced to abandon the town three days later. Following this, the 29th Army was sent forward from Toropets to reinforce the Soviet position and allow the 22nd to withdraw to new defenses along the Lovat River. This situation, with a sizeable Soviet force hanging over the left flank of Army Group Center, would continue for another 30 days. In his late-day report on August 3, Timoshenko stated that the 243rd had crossed southward over the Western Dvina River with two regiments and reached the Baevo, Voskresenskoe and Poiarkovo line, 55km south of Toropets against elements of the 14th Motorized Division. Late the next day he issued new attack orders, specifying that the 243rd and 252nd were to make a concentrated attack toward Ilyino, after which they were to send strong covering forces toward Velizh, reach the Olenitsa and Zamoshchitsa front by the end of August 6, and subsequently attack toward Demidov. The following day the 243rd was reported as attacking toward Ilyino and fighting for the Tolkachi, Hill 193.8, Zakhody, Bodnevka and Liubimovo line at 1630 hours.

=== Dukhovshchina Offensive ===
Timoshenko began planning for a renewed effort on August 14 which was intended to recapture Dukhovshchina en route to Smolensk. The STAVKA ordered this to be coordinated with Zhukov's Reserve Front on August 17 in order to engulf the entire front from Toropets in the north to Bryansk in the south. In the event, due to the chaotic situation, Timoshenko was forced to conduct the operation in piecemeal fashion and was unable to establish close cooperation with Zhukov. On August 15 General Parkhomenko left the division, but within a month he was appointed to command of the 311th Rifle Division, and he would lead three others before the end of the war. He was replaced the following day by Col. Pavel Petrovich Miroshnichenko, who had been serving as deputy chief of staff of 29th Army.

In Western Front's report at 0800 hours on August 18 the offensive's progress during the latter half of the previous day; the 243rd was stated as fighting along a line from 1,000m northeast of Andreevskaia to Malyi Borok, 11-12km northeast of Ilyino. The progress of 29th Army was being retarded by the late arrival of 246th Rifle Division. A further report that evening described the division's activity over the previous 24 hours:

243rd RD - conducting night operations against stubborn enemy resistance and heavy artillery and mortar fire, reached the 1 kilometre east of Trubniki to the unnamed heights north of Pesochek front, enveloped the strong point at Pesochek from the north, and is fighting for the unnamed heights south of Andreevskaia with the regiments on its right wing and in its center, while the regiment on its left wing is fighting for the Bodievka and Viaskovo line against stubborn enemy resistance, with strong enemy fire from the strong point at Katkovo and numerous blindages and bunkers. The division destroyed up to four enemy companies.

Timoshenko considered the day's action successful, but the difficulties both 29th and 30th Armies concentrating and employing their fresh reserves qualified that success.

In Timoshenko's estimation, if Maslennikov's forces could defeat and collapse German 9th Army's relatively weak left wing along and south of the Western Dvina this might spell success for the counteroffensive as a whole. The 26th and 6th Infantry Division of VI Army Corps and the 129th Infantry of V Army Corps, all understrength due to earlier fighting and each defending sectors roughly 30km wide, faced 29th Army. Aware of the vulnerability of this sector, Hitler and the OKH had just ordered Army Group Center to dispatch the bulk of 3rd Panzer Group northward to reinforce Army Group North's flagging offensive toward Leningrad and deal with the situation facing 9th Army's left flank en route. On August 19 the 29th Army essentially stalled, in part due to the laggard 246th Division. At 1900 hours Maslennikov sent a detailed attack order to Western Front, specifying that the 243rd, backed by one battery of its own 303rd Antitank Battalion, was to conduct its main attack along the Novinka Farm, Tselpino Farm, Porosiatnikovo Farm, and Parakhino axis, from 12km east-northeast of Ilyino to reach the Marker 194.3, Tselpino Farm and Tiulki line, and take Ilyino in cooperation with the 246th. The remaining batteries of the 303rd formed the Army's antitank reserve. Maslennikov also reported that the division had captured Pesochek at 1500 despite strong airstrikes and counterattacks, as well as the feat on the previous day of one Sgt. Musenko, a squad leader of the 912th Rifle Regiment, who helped repel a German company attacking from Sokovichino for 18 hours.

The following day Maslennikov began reporting German reinforcements arriving behind the left flank of 9th Army; apparently gained by air reconnaissance these were likely forces of LVII Motorized Corps regrouping toward Velikiye Luki. He also claimed 300 German casualties and two mortar batteries destroyed in the 243rd's sector on August 19, although the Army's positions were generally unchanged. Timoshenko, distracted by his successful actions in the 19th Army sector, even on August 21 failed to appreciate what his right wing forces would soon be facing. At 1745 hours he "somewhat caustically" directed Maslennikov to reorganize his offensive against 9th Army's left wing:

252nd RD, protected on the right, will attack from the Ust'e and Vypolzovo line toward Kozino and Il'ino, and 246th, together with 243rd RD, from the Baevo and Ias'kovo line in the general direction of Il'ino.

However, the next day the full extent of the effort against 22nd Army began to become clear. 29th Army attacked at 1400 but encountered strong resistance, and the division was reported as attacking toward Porosiatnikovo and Parakhino; no gains were noted. On August 23 the Army attempted to continue its attacks but by the end of the day unsettling news from the Velikiye Luki area was forcing Timoshenko to alter his plans significantly. At 1430, Maslennikov informed his own units that "at least an enemy panzer division has penetrated toward Velikie Luki from the west... a threat is being created to 22nd Army's rear and 29th Army's flank." He went on to state that the 246th and 243rd Divisions were attacking decisively southward toward Ilyino, and that a sniper company was protecting the Belianka Farm and Sevastianovo sectors. At 2000 Timoshenko reported much the same while also claiming that the two divisions had destroyed two German infantry battalions the previous day. On the following evening Western Front stated flatly that 22nd Army was "under attack by a large enemy force," while the 243rd and 246th persisted it its crawling advance on Ilyino, with the former capturing the northeastern outskirts of Malyi Borok and enveloping Hill 209.6 from the south. The day's fighting cost 29th Army nearly 1,000 casualties. As the crisis developed Maslennikov was ordered to take control of 22nd Army's sector and he reported back at 0700 on August 25 that, among other measures, the 243rd was emplacing obstacles and mines on the road junctions and roads along the Katkovo and Kanat and the Khalotomino and Prudok axes while blowing up bridges, crossings and roads. It was still 15km east-northeast of Ilyino.

=== Retreat to Rzhev ===
On August 28 the 243rd was defending, backed by the 5th Battery of the 644th Cannon Artillery Regiment, in positions from 12km northeast of Ilyino to 18km north-northeast. At this time the 3rd Panzer Group was making a determined effort to destroy 22nd Army near Toropets, and the 206th Infantry Division captured the isthmus between Lake Zhizhitskoye and Dvine, brushing the 252nd Division aside and entering the 29th Army's rear north of Ilyino. Timoshenko and Maslennikov made every effort to restore some semblance of order on Western Front's right flank, but by now 22nd Army was a broken reed and only the scant forces of 29th Army or Front reserves could stem the German tide. Toropets fell on August 30 and the 243rd and 252nd Divisions were ordered north to assist the neighboring Army. On the evening of August 31 the 243rd was directed to leave one regiment along the western bank of the Western Dvina to protect its southern flank as it withdrew, to march east along the Korotyshi–Konovo–Barlovo–Borok route, and occupy and defend the Yamishche, Zaozerke, and Borok sector.

By September 2 the 243rd had reached and was digging in to its new positions in the Yamishche and Khotino sector, 10–18km north of Zapadnaya Dvina. The next day the Front reported that the division's positions were unchanged, while a panzer division was operating opposite its front and conducting strong artillery and mortar fire. In a general assault by Western Front on September 4-5, the 243rd was able to make some westward gains, including the village of Shatry plus Hills 235.4, 203.7 and 205.8, and drove back two German infantry regiments in cooperation with the 252nd Division. However, by the second day, along with its Army, the division was no longer capable of attacking due to high losses and was defending the Borok and Novaia Derevnia line. On September 23, Colonel Miroshnichenko was moved to the post of head of the combat training department of 29th Army. He would later command the 174th Rifle Division and was promoted to the rank of major general in May 1942 while serving as chief of staff of 39th Army but was killed in action in July while attempting to escape from encirclement near Rzhev. Col. Yakov Gavrilovich Tsarkov took over the 243rd the following day.

At the end of September six of the armies of Western Front, now under command of Col. Gen. I. S. Konev, were occupying a defense in a sector 347km wide along a line from Lake Seliger to west of Andreapol to Yartsevo to Yelnya. The plan of defense designated counterattacks in the event of a German penetration:

On the Rzhev operational axis in the area of Belyi: with the 107th Motorized Rifle Division, situated in Western Front reserve, and the 30th Army's 251st Rifle Division. If necessary, the 29th Army's 243rd Rifle Division would also be committed to the counterattack.

In case of the counterattacks' failures it was planned to fall back to the prepared rear army-level line of defense and continue the battle there.

Operation Typhoon began at 0530 hours on October 2 and the forces of 3rd Panzer Group and 9th Army soon penetrated along the boundary between 19th and 30th Armies. On the afternoon of October 5 the Chief of the General Staff, Marshal B. M. Shaposhnikov, summoned Konev to a telegraph machine for talks. Konev reported that the situation of the 22nd and 29th Armies was unchanged, and (erroneously) that the penetration of 30th Army had been held up. Shaposhnikov stated that his information indicated that "your situation at Belyi has become difficult." Konev replied that fighting at Bely was ongoing (in fact it had already fallen), that Maslennikov had departed for there, and that the 243rd was moving from Nelidovo.

== Battle for Kalinin ==
By October 7 all was confusion on the Soviet side of the lines. Western Front was largely out of contact with its forces. Focused on cobbling together a force that could prevent the fall of Moscow, at 0200 hours on October 10 the STAVKA ordered seven rifle divisions pulled out of Western Front's right wing, including the 243rd and 246th from 29th Army. On the 12th it signalled Zhukov to retain these, plus the 5th, 133rd and 256th Divisions, for the defense of the Kalinin region. At this time the 243rd and 246th were waiting to detrain in Rzhev and march on Staritsa. Meanwhile, Army Group Center was trying to exploit eastwards, but was being held up by lack of supplies, ongoing resistance by the tattered Red Army, and the autumn rains. XXXXI Motorized Corps was ordered to capture Kalinin, and during October 8-14 ground its way forward to take the city. Along the way the Corps' 1st Panzer Division rolled into Staritsa at 1500 on October 12 and may or may not have captured the Volga River bridge there. At 1800 hours on October 14 this division reported that it had cleared the center of Kalinin.

The German hold on the city was tenuous, and the panzers were expected to continue their advance toward the northwest along the Torzhok road. The next day Maslennikov spelled out his orders to his divisions. The 243rd, part of the Right Group with the 174th Division, was to cross the Volga at Staritsa and attack toward Pushkino to attack the supply lines of the German Corps about 27km south of the city. The 243rd was to lead, with the 510th Howitzer Regiment and a battery of the 873rd Antitank Regiment in support. The plan was detailed, ambitious, and ultimately unsuccessful, despite the German artillery defending at Staritsa having run completely out of ammunition. After dark, the division began moving off to the northwest to find another crossing point.

Overnight on October 16/17 Konev came up with a much more ambitious plan. Maslennikov was now to cross the Volga with five divisions, including the 243rd, some 15km south-southwest of Kalinin and from there link up with 30th Army, which was supposed to be attacking toward the city from the southeast, thus cutting off XXXXI Corps. The 246th Division got one rifle regiment across at Akishevo, and quickly emplaced two assault bridges, at which point the river began to rise dramatically, washing out both bridges as well as a German bridge under construction at Staritsa. That evening, in an effort to rationalize command and control in the region, the STAVKA decreed the creation of Kalinin Front, under Konev's command, including 22nd, 29th and 30th Armies, plus the Operational Group under Lt. Gen. N. F. Vatutin.

The same evening, Maslennikov visited the proposed crossing site and ordered the operation halted. He then disregarded his orders from Konev and directed the 243rd and three other divisions, including the 246th, to move north on the west bank of the river to cut the road between Kalinin and Marino. Elements of the 243rd that had crossed to the east bank were recalled. The following day the division was on the march toward the village of Mednoye on the Torzhok road. This continued into October 18 in part because the 243rd had the longest march to its new positions. On the same day the 133rd Rifle Division occupied Novoye Kalikino on this road near Kalinin, cutting off the 900th Lehr Brigade and the bulk of 1st Panzer. By 0800 hours on October 19 the XXXXI Corps declared the situation "critical" and that Lehr, coming under pressure from 183rd Rifle Division, would have to pull back from Marino. By October 20 Maslennikov's army was entering the battle northwest of Kalinin, along the Torzhok road, and the 243rd, along with the Separate Motorized Rifle Brigade, formed the southern prong encircling Lehr. This brigade, with minimal fuel and ammunition, was ordered to abandon Mednoye and fight its way out between the road and the Tma River; this turned out to be the first Soviet soil to be permanently liberated during the war. By the end of the day, XXXXI Corps conceded that no further advance toward Torzhok was currently possible, and that its forces would have to withdraw to Kalinin. On the same day the 243rd was reported as being in "quite satisfactory condition" with a total fighting strength of about 60 percent of establishment.

The German priority on October 21 was to rescue as much of 1st Panzer as possible. Meanwhile, Konev was still looking to a "large solution" of striking across the Volga into the rear of XXXXI Corps and encircling it entirely. This would require a 180 degree turn and countermarch over heavily muddy roads and was impractical at best. Instead the fighting went on along the Torzhok road and the combined Soviet force claimed over 500 German officers and men killed, wounded or captured, along with tens of motor vehicles, 20 tanks and 200 motorcycles. Konev's orders called for a reorganization of 29th Army, followed by a crossing of the Volga in the area of Putilovo and the mouth of the Tma. This was somewhat more realistic than his previous plan, by now German infantry was beginning to arrive in the Kalinin area. On the next day the 243rd was diverted to contain a bridgehead the 6th Infantry Division had established over the Volga that threatened the Army's rear.

On October 24, as German 9th Army pushed north the 243rd and 183rd Divisions, with the 54th Cavalry Division, took up positions on the north bank of the Tma on a 29km-wide front from Kunganovo to Nesterovo on the Volga. As the battle wound down, on October 30 Maslennikov was forced to withdraw those elements of his Army, including one regiment of the 243rd, that were east of the Volga fighting for the village of Danilovskoye. Both sides were exhausted, but Kalinin remained in German hands. As the fighting moved toward Moscow, Colonel Tsarkov was replaced in command by Maj. Gen. Vitalii Sergeevich Polenov on November 27. Kalinin would be liberated on December 19, the first major city freed from Nazi Germany.

=== Battles for Rzhev ===
During January 1942 the division was transferred to 30th Army, still in Kalinin Front. It took part in the winter counteroffensive west of Moscow, quickly closing in on, but not quite taking, Rzhev. On January 20 General Polenov left the division to take the position of deputy commander of 29th Army; he would go on to lead the 31st, 5th and 47th Armies, being promoted to the rank of lieutenant general in February 1943, and ended the war in command of 108th Rifle Corps. The new commander of the 243rd was Col. Vasilii Kuzmich Guryashin. In March the division returned to 29th Army after that Army broke out of encirclement. Colonel Guryashin left the division on April 18 and was replaced by Maj. Mikhail Ivanovich Kasnov (Lt. Colonel as of April 28), but this officer was in turn replaced on May 22 by Col. Aleksandr Andreevich Kutsenko, who had previously commanded the 174th and 20th Guards Rifle Divisions.

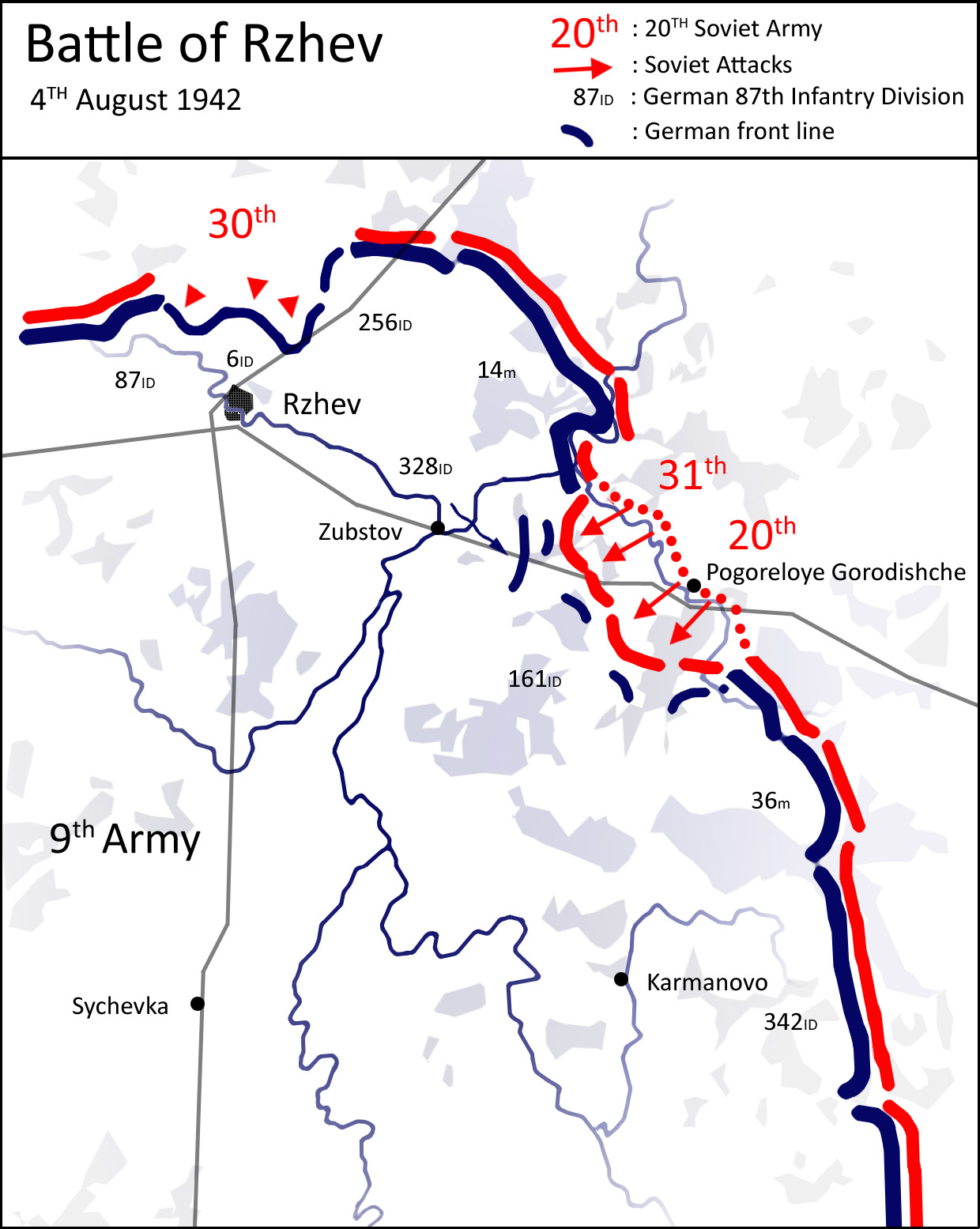
Attack of Western Front, August 4, 1942

The 243rd was in 30th Army during the First Rzhev–Sychyovka Offensive Operation. In August it liberated the village of Kopytikh, to the northeast of Rzhev, and in savage fighting repulsed 14 German counterattacks, and went on the attack itself eight times. Later that month it was transferred to Western Front along with the rest of 30th Army. The 243rd was reassigned to 20th Army, still in Western Front, in December, in the last gasps of Operation Mars, to help make one last desperate attempt to break the German positions and capture Sychyovka. On December 11 the relatively-fresh 243rd, backed by the 5th Tank Corps, which had been held in reserve, made an attack en masse alongside the 247th, 336th, 415th and 30th Guards Rifle Divisions, but together they made scanty gains of 500 - 1,000 metres at significant cost, and failed to capture a single German-held fortified village:

A rocket rising into the air signalled the attack. All those around came to life. The cries of "Forward!" and "For the Fatherland!" resounded across the fields. It was at 1010 hours 11 December 1942. The first to rush forward were the regiments of the 20th Army's 243rd and 247th Rifle Divisions. Soon, however, their forward ranks were forced to take cover against the heavy enemy fire. A fierce, bloody battle began that lasted all day. The attack misfired almost along the entire extent of the penetration front.

Three days later, the offensive was shut down for good. In the period from November 25 to December 18 the division lost 748 men killed and 1,954 wounded, plus four missing, for a total of 2,706 casualties. It was almost immediately withdrawn into the Reserve of the Supreme High Command for rebuilding and redeployment.

== Into Ukraine ==
The division was then railed southward in January 1943, to join 3rd Guards Army in Southwestern Front. On January 8 the commander of the Front, General Vatutin, had reported to the STAVKA on his plans to further develop the winter counteroffensive, noting that Army Group B was completing the withdrawal of its defeated forces behind the Northern Donets along the Morozovskii and Shakhty axes.

=== Operation Gallop ===
By the beginning of February the 3rd Guards Army held a bridgehead over the Northern Donets River south of Voroshilovgrad from which it broke out in a drive to liberate that city. On February 4 the Army's formations were issued orders. At this time the 243rd was moving up to the front and concentrating in the area Mosty–Sadki–Zelenovka and with the 229th Rifle Brigade constituted the reserve of the Army commander, Lt. Gen. D. D. Lelyushenko. The advance on Voroshilovgrad was being led by the 279th Rifle Division and elements of the 2nd Guards Tank Corps, which by the end of February 5 were within 18km of the city. Throughout February 7-9 these forces were involved in bitter fighting along its southern outskirts repelling uninterrupted counterattacks. Also on February 5 the 243rd was ordered toward Ogulchanskii, which it captured the next day, destroying the German force occupying height 181.4, and by the close of February 8 had begun fighting for Voroshilovka, Valeevka and Novo-Svetlovka along the line of the Luganchik River. This fighting continued into February 12; Colonel Kutsenko would later be criticised for attacking these positions head-on instead of outflanking Voroshilovka from the north and attacking from the west.

On February 8 Lelyushenko decided to dispatch the 8th Guards Cavalry Corps toward Voroshilovgrad and to reinforce the 279th with the 912th Rifle Regiment. The 8th Guards Cavalry, along with the 279th, undertook a series of unsuccessful attacks on the city from the south and southwest. The 912th was involved in the same fighting during February 10-11. The 59th Guards Rifle Division joined the attack on the second day. By February 12 the German counterattacks were noticeably weakening. On the same day the main forces of the 243rd, in cooperation with 2nd Guards Tanks, finally outflanked the Luganchik line, encircled and destroyed most of its defenders. By the end of February 14 the division had reached the Davydovka State Farm (Sovkhoz) as the surviving defenders of the outlying defenses fell back into and past the city. The general attack to clear Voroshilovgrad had begun at dawn and by nightfall it was completely in Soviet hands.

=== Battle of the Dniepr ===
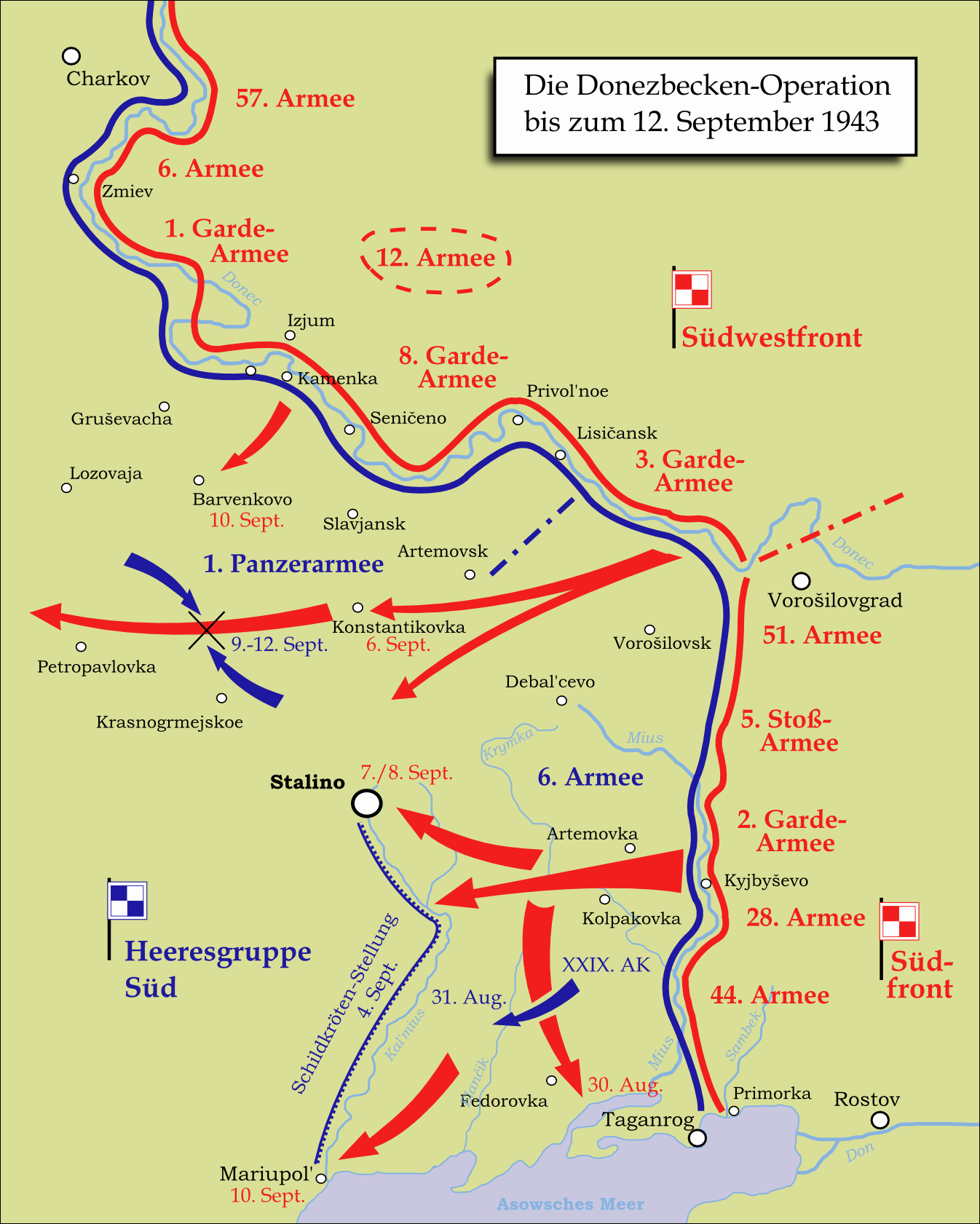
Donbas Operation August 1943

The division remained in 3rd Guards Army until June; in late February it was assigned to the 18th Rifle Corps but in April it returned to direct Army control. When the summer offensive into the Donbas began in July it was in 33rd Rifle Corps as part of 1st Guards Army, still in Southwestern Front. 1st Guards Army took part in the largely unsuccessful Izium–Barvenkovo offensive beginning on July 17, after which the 33rd Corps was transferred to 8th Guards Army in the same Front. The Donbas offensive was renewed on August 13, and soon broke through the 1st Panzer and 6th Armies' lines along the Northern Donets and Mius Rivers. By August 23 1st Panzer Army was in trouble with its army corps south of Izium reduced to a combat strength of just 5,800 men and unable to hold a continuous line. On the 31st Field Marshal E. von Manstein was finally authorized to withdraw both armies to the Kalmius River, effectively beginning the race to the Dniepr.

In August the 33rd Corps was again reassigned, now to 6th Army in Southwestern Front. Within a month the 243rd had left both the Corps and the Army and was serving directly under Front command (3rd Ukrainian Front as of October 20). From October until February 1944 the 243rd part of 3rd Guards Army, now in 4th Ukrainian Front, serving in the 34th Guards Rifle Corps. This Front had begun a new offensive against the German 6th Army on October 9 with the objectives of liberating Melitopol and cutting off the German 17th Army in the Crimea. The fighting for Melitopol continued until October 23, after which two of the Front's armies drove west across the Nogay Steppe, splitting 6th Army in two. The northern portion fell back toward the Dniepr, forming a bridgehead south of Nikopol which was soon invested by 3rd Guards Army on the right (north) flank of the Front. During November substantial German reserves were moved into the bridgehead in anticipation of an offensive to restore communications with Crimea. This came to nothing in the face of Soviet threats elsewhere, but the bridgehead remained strongly held.

=== Nikopol-Krivoi Rog Offensive ===
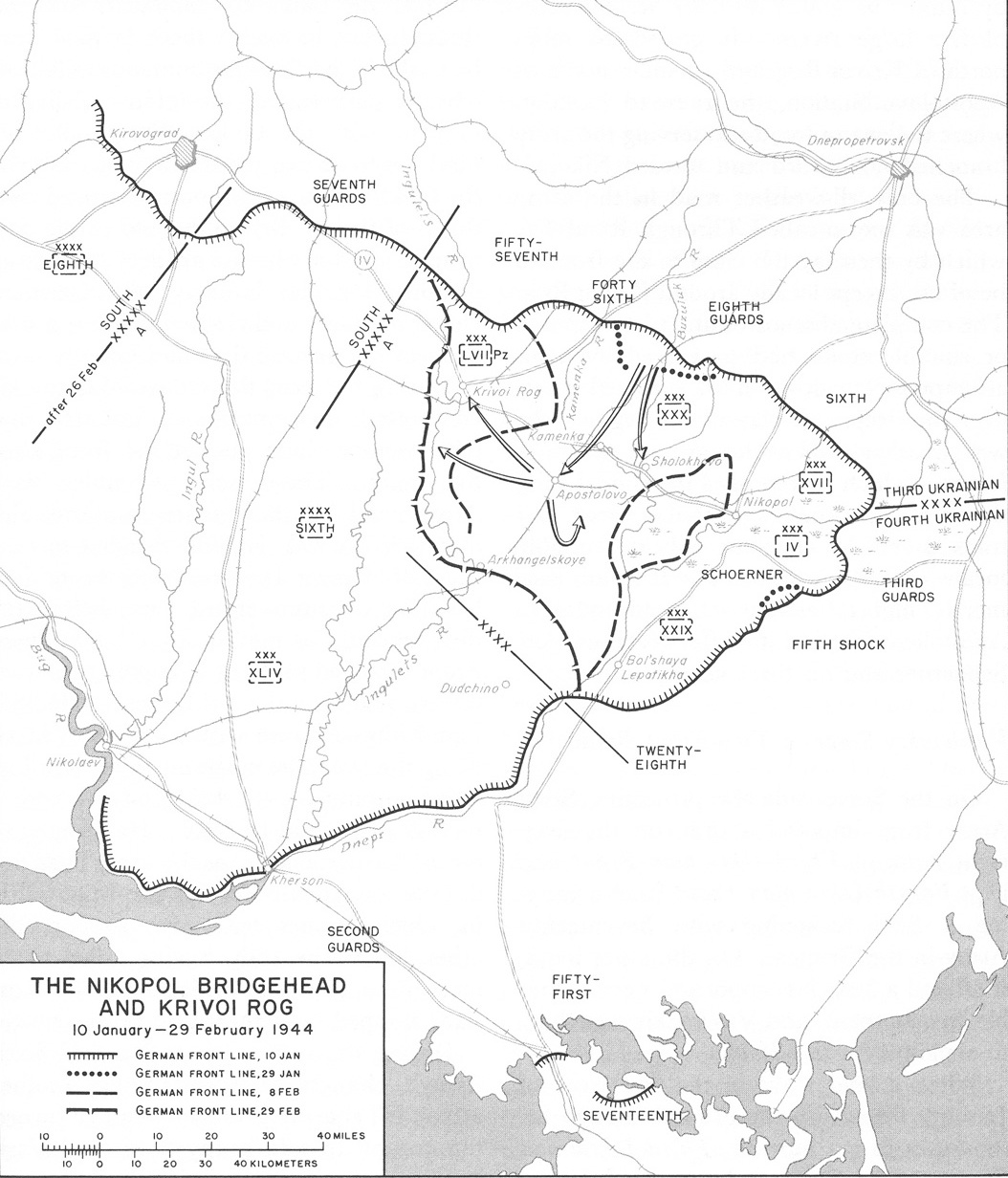
Nikopol-Krivoi Rog Offensive.

A cold wave in the first week of January firmed up the ground enough for the 4th and 3rd Ukrainian Fronts to begin moving against the remaining German positions in the Dniepr bend. 3rd Ukrainian began its assault on January 10, but this had largely failed by the 13th. On the same day the 4th Ukrainian attacked the bridgehead but made minimal gains before both Fronts called a halt on January 16. The next day Colonel Kutsenko was promoted to the rank of major general, but a week later he left the division, being replaced by Lt. Col. Georgii Maksimovich Sklyarov. Kutsenko served in the training establishment into the postwar. The offensive was renewed on January 30 against a bridgehead weakened by transfers and 4th Ukrainian drove a deep wedge into its south end. On February 4 the German 6th Army ordered the bridgehead to be evacuated. On February 8 the men and women of the division played a leading role in the liberation of Nikopol, and received the name of that city as an honorific. Later that month the division was transferred to the 6th Army in 3rd Ukrainian Front, where it came under the 66th Rifle Corps for several weeks before returning to 34th Guards Corps, also in 6th Army.

=== Battle for Odesa ===
With the diversion of 4th Ukrainian Front into the Crimea, 3rd Ukrainian took up the southern flank as the Red Army pressed onward into western Ukraine. Lt. Colonel Sklyarov handed the 243rd over to Col. Makarii Minovich Topolev on March 14. On March 26 the Front commander, Army Gen. R. Ya. Malinovskii, ordered a renewed offensive in the direction of Odesa, which included the 6th Army. On April 4 Cavalry-Mechanized Group Pliyev and the lead elements of 37th Army captured the town of Razdelnaia, again splitting German 6th Army in two. 6th Army was now ordered to envelop Odesa from the northwest. After heavy fighting the 5th Shock Army entered the city's northern suburbs on the evening of April 9. Overnight the forward elements of 8th Guards Army, 6th Army, and the Pliyev Group also drew up to the Odesa defenses. With the Soviet trap closing the German LXXII Army Corps began breaking out to the west, allowing the Soviet forces to liberate the city by 1000 hours on April 10 after only minor fighting. On April 20 the 243rd would be awarded the Order of the Red Banner for its part in the fighting for Odesa.

== Jassy-Kishinev Offensives ==
On April 22 Col. Mitrofan Sergeevich Tkachyov took command of the division; at this time it was again assigned to 66th Corps. On April 25 the 243rd was in second echelon of a corps assault on the German strongpoint at Leontevo, which was helping to confine Soviet forces in their bridgehead over the Dniestr south of Tiraspol. This effort, led by the 203rd and 333rd Rifle Divisions, continued until the 28th and was brought to a halt by intense German artillery, mortar and machine gun fire; in consequence the 243rd was not committed.

On May 4, 6th Army was disbanded by General Malinovskii, and the 243rd went back to 34th Guards Corps, now in 5th Shock Army. This corps was then shifted to the north of Grigoriopol, being in position by May 10. The front's orders called for an ambitious operation in mid-May to eliminate a German bridgehead on the east bank of the Dniestr, then to cross the river and help encircle the enemy forces facing 8th Guards Army farther south. 34th Guards Corps had 23rd Tank Corps plus two artillery and two mortar regiments in support, and the 243rd was in first echelon with the 203rd, with the 248th Rifle Division in second echelon on the left. After a 30-minute artillery preparation beginning at 0300 hours on May 14 the assault smashed the defenses of the battle group of 17th Infantry Division holding the line, and within hours had cleared the long salient of German troops. However, the position proved to be a trap. While the attackers could now fire into the rear of the German forces facing 8th Guards Army, those forces were still strong enough to continue constricting that Army's bridgehead. Meanwhile, the troops in the salient were supposed to continue their attack across the river, so they could not dig in, while they were taking fire from three sides. Within days it was clear that the position was untenable, and German counterattacks across the river had cut off the "bottle" by noon on May 17; the village of Koshnitsa was taken two days later. On the night of May 19/20 the remainder of the encircled men were forced to break out to their own lines. The 203rd Division, fighting alongside the 243rd, reported its highest casualties of any operation of the war; this was likely true for the 243rd as well.

=== Second Jassy-Kishinev Offensive ===
During June the division was transferred to 2nd Ukrainian Front where it joined the 57th Rifle Corps under direct Front command. It would remain in this Front until after the German surrender. At the start of the Second Jassy-Kishinev Offensive the Corps (now containing the 243rd, 203rd and 228th Rifle Divisions) was still in reserve on the right flank of the Front backing the 52nd and 27th Armies, which formed the Front's shock group. The Corps was to be ready to operate in the zone of either of these as needed. When the offensive began on August 20 the 57th Corps was initially involved in the artillery preparation only. During the first three days the shock group completed the breakthrough of the Axis front and the Front reserves (53rd Army, 57th and 27th Guards Rifle Corps) were ordered to move to the area south of the Podu Iloaiei–Iași road during the night of August 22/23. Over the remainder of the operation the Corps advanced southward to cut off and reduce the retreating German and Romanian forces. By the beginning of September the Corps had been officially assigned to 53rd Army. On September 20 Colonel Tkachyov left the division and was replaced by his chief of staff, Col. Nikolai Nikolaevich Parfentev.

== Into the Balkans ==
The division soon entered Hungary, and in the course of the advance one regiment won a battle honor:

SZEGED... 906th Rifle Regiment (Lt. Colonel Tishchenko, Mikhail Ignatovich)... The troops who participated in the liberation of Cluj and Szeged, by the order of the Supreme High Command of 11 October 1944, and a commendation in Moscow, are given a salute of 20 artillery salvoes from 224 guns.

On October 28 the left flank forces of 2nd Ukrainian Front, including 53rd Army, began an operation to defeat the German-Hungarian forces in and around Budapest. By this time the 243rd was part of 49th Rifle Corps, still in 53rd Army. The main drive was carried out by 7th Guards and 46th Armies while the 53rd provided flank security. On October 29 the Army advanced up to 13km and reached the outskirts of Polgár. By the morning of November 4 the 27th Army relieved the 53rd along the front from Polgár to Tiszafüred while it regrouped to force the Tisza River three days later. On November 11 the Army's right flank corps began fighting for the southern outskirts of Füzesabony; the town did not finally fall until the 15th after which the Army commander, Lt. Gen. I. M. Managarov, was ordered to develop the offensive in the direction of Verpelét. By November 20 the 53rd reached the southeastern slopes of the Mátra Mountains between Gyöngyös and Eger where the Axis forces were able to organize a powerful defense which brought the advance to a halt until November 26. At about this time the 243rd had been moved again, now to the 24th Guards Rifle Corps in the same Army.

During December the 243rd was again reassigned, now to the 27th Guards Rifle Corps in 7th Guards Army. The offensive on Budapest itself began at 1045 hours on December 5 following an artillery preparation which successfully suppressed the German firing points and by the end of December 9 the 7th Guards had reached a line from Nandor to Borsosberenke to the left bank of the Danube in the Verőce area.

=== Into Czechoslovakia ===
Before the end of the siege of Budapest the 7th Guards Army was advancing towards Slovakia. In February 1945 the division returned to 24th Guards Corps, still in that Army, but a month later it was back under direct command of 53rd Army. On April 7 Colonel Parfentev was assigned to study at the Voroshilov Academy and was replaced the next day by Col. Mikhail Alekseevich Bushin, who would remain in this position for the remainder of the division's existence.

Later that month the division came under the 50th Rifle Corps in Pliyev's Cavalry-Mechanized Group, and was under these commands when Brno was liberated on April 26. On May 28 the 910th Rifle Regiment would be awarded the Order of Bogdan Khmelnitsky, 2nd Degree, while the 775th Artillery Regiment received the Order of Suvorov, 3rd Degree, in recognition for their roles in this victory.

== Manchurian Campaign and Postwar ==
53rd Army was selected for transfer to the far east for the campaign against the Japanese Kwantung Army in Manchuria, largely due to its experience in fighting through the Carpathian Mountains during 1944-45. After crossing the continent via the Trans-Siberian Railway it joined the Transbaikal Front; by the beginning of August the 243rd was in the 49th Rifle Corps, which also contained the 6th Rifle Division. In common with most of the rifle divisions sent to the far east it received a battalion of 12 SU-76 self-propelled guns to provide mobile firepower through the mountainous and nearly roadless terrain they were expected to encounter.

The Soviet operation began on August 9 but 53rd Army was in the Front's second echelon and remained in assembly areas in Mongolia until the second day when it began crossing the border in the tracks of 6th Guards Tank Army. The commander of Japanese 3rd Area Army had already ordered those of his forces not already cut off to withdraw to defend north and south of Mukden. The advance largely became a challenge to overcome the narrow roads and mountain passes of the Greater Khingan range. The Army accomplished this and on August 15 moved into the yawning gap between the 17th Army and 6th Guards Tanks with the objective to secure Kailu. The advance was unhindered and on September 1 the 53rd Army occupied Kailu, Chaoyang, Fuxin and Gushanbeitseifu while forward detachments reached the Chinchou area on the Gulf of Liaotung.

When the August campaign ended, the division was given credit for its performance by receiving the name of the Khingan range as its second honorific, making its final full title 243rd Rifle, Nikopol-Khingan, Order of the Red Banner Division (Russian: 243-я стрелковая Никопольско-Хинганская Краснознамённая дивизия). The division was disbanded in the fall of 1945 along with the 53rd Army.
