= 359th Rifle Division =

- Active: 1941–1945
- Country: Soviet Union
- Branch: Red Army
- Type: Division
- Role: Infantry
- Engagements: Battle of Moscow; Battles of Rzhev; Battle of Smolensk (1943); Korsun-Cherkassy Pocket; Lvov-Sandomierz Offensive; Vistula-Oder Offensive; Lower Silesian Offensive Operation; Siege of Breslau
- Decorations: Order of Lenin; Order of the Red Banner
- Battle honours: Yartsevo

Commanders
- Notable commanders: Col. Aleksandr Mikhailovich Filippov; Col. Zalman Ionovich Khotimsky; Maj. Gen. Vladimir Romanovich Vashkevich; Col. Vasily Kuzmich Guryashin; Col. Pyotr Pavlovich Kosolapov

The 359th Rifle Division was raised in 1941 as a standard Red Army rifle division, and served for the duration of the Great Patriotic War in that role. It took part in the costly battles around the German salient near Rzhev through 1942 and into 1943. Following this it served in the summer offensive towards Smolensk, also at considerable cost, but it won a battle honor for its role in the liberation of Yartsevo. After a brief rebuilding in the reserves, the division was moved south to the 1st Ukrainian Front, taking part in the liberation of Ukraine through 1944. Following the Vistula-Oder Offensive, the 359th gathered high honors during the fighting around Breslau in 1945, but along with many other distinguished Soviet formations it was disbanded with the coming of peace.

== Formation ==
The division began forming in the Perm oblast of the Urals Military District in August 1941. At its formation, the basic order of battle was as follows:

- 1194th Rifle Regiment
- 1196th Rifle Regiment
- 1198th Rifle Regiment
- 924th Artillery Regiment
- 641st (later 443rd) Sapper Battalion
- 812th Signal Battalion (later 218th Signal Company)
- 423rd Reconnaissance Company

The 221st Antitank Battalion would be added in 1942. The first divisional commander to be assigned was Col. Aleksandr Mikhailovich Filippov on 1 September. However, he was replaced on 3 October by Col. Zalman Ionovich Khotimsky. The unit began moving west in November and was first assigned to 28th Army which was forming up in the Reserve of the Supreme High Command. It went to the front in December as a separate division, joining Kalinin Front before being assigned to 31st Army. It was noted at that time as being at full strength for personnel, with 10,000 officers and men assigned.

In February 1942, the 359th was reassigned to the 30th Army, in the same general area north - northwest of Rzhev. On 28 February, Colonel Khotimsky was replaced in command by Maj. Gen. Vladimir Romanovich Vashkevich, the only general officer who would command the division. In August it moved with 30th Army to Western Front.

=== Operation Mars ===
At the end of September General Vashkevich was appointed as chief of staff of 20th Army, while officially remaining in command of the division. On 20 November he was replaced by Col. Vasily Kuzmich Guryashin. In the first days of December it was becoming clear that the Second Rzhev-Sychyovka Strategic Offensive (a.k.a. Operation Mars) was looking like it would be a costly failure. In an effort to salvage something from the ruins, Army General G. K. Zhukov issued revised orders to attempt to encircle and destroy at least part of the German forces. 39th Army had had some success in the Molodoi Tud area in the early going. The new plan was to renew the attack from this area, with supporting, or diversionary, attacks by 30th Army's 359th and 380th Rifle Divisions. The attack went in on 3 December, after a brief but violent artillery preparation. The German forward defenses were penetrated, and more artillery was brought into the bridgehead on the south bank of the Volga. But by evening, the division's attack on the 251st Infantry Division's right flank was contained.

== Advance ==
On 13 August 1943, Colonel Guryashin handed his command to Col. Pyotr Pavlovich Kosolapov, who would remain in this post for the duration of the war. By September, as Western Front advanced towards Smolensk, the division was in the 36th Rifle Corps of 31st Army. On 19 September it was awarded a divisional honorific:

"YARTSEVO"... 359th Rifle Division (Colonel Kosolapov, Pyotr Pavlovich)... The troops that broke through the enemy's defense along the road to Smolensk and participated in the battles for Dukhovshchina and Yartsevo, by the order of the Supreme High Command of September 19, 1943, and a commendation in Moscow, are given a salute of 12 artillery salvoes from 124 guns.

Following the liberation of Smolensk, Western Front continued its offensive towards Orsha. The first attempt to take this city began on the morning of 3 October. Lt. Gen. V. A. Gluzdovsky, commander of 31st Army, deployed the 36th Corps north of the Smolensk-Orsha road, with the 359th and 215th Rifle Divisions in the first echelon, facing the defenses of the German 197th Infantry Division. Over the next three days, the reinforced Corps, in tandem with the attack of 5th Army to the north, unhinged the German defenses north of the highway and drove them westwards through the village of Ermaki. Further Soviet pressure over the following days forced the 197th Infantry to withdraw on 9 October to a new positions astride the highway from Krasnoe to Gerasimenki. These could not be held, and a further retreat took place on the 11th, when the German forces took up yet another defensive line, from Shcheki on the Verkhita River, southward across the highway at Redki, to the Dniepr at Novaia. At this point General Gluzdovsky was ordered to halt briefly and prepare for a new assault on 12 October.

The second Orsha offensive began with an 85-minute artillery preparation, which was largely ineffective due to a timely withdrawal by the defenders to their second trench line. In heavy fighting over the next two days, 31st Army's attack stalled at considerable cost and with no appreciable gains. Over the next ten days Western Front carried out a major regrouping which, among other things, moved part of the Army south of the highway. The 65th Guards Rifle Division was transferred from 10th Guards Army and relieved units of the 359th during the night of 23 October in the Sharino region. When the offensive was renewed that day, the division was in the second echelon. The frontal assault smashed the defenses of the 197th Infantry, again at huge cost in casualties, and penetrated as much as 4 km deep, but the commitment of armor from 2nd Guards Tank Corps the following day produced gains of less than a kilometre. The 359th was brought up with other units from the second echelon on the 24th, but ran into heavy German artillery fire, to which they had no effective reply due to low ammunition stocks. A halt was ordered late on 26 October, and the Soviet forces dug in.

By the time the fourth Orsha offensive began on 14 November, the rifle divisions of Western Front were down to an average strength of 4,500 men. On the first day the 338th Rifle Division advanced about 1.5 km, but the remaining divisions of 31st Army bogged down in the German security zone under withering machine-gun fire. On the next day the Army made no further progress at all, and General Gluzdovskii ordered the second echelon divisions of 36 Corps into combat. In five days of intense fighting an advance of no more than 4 km was accomplished; Western Front's total casualties amounted to 38,756. Yet another attack began on 30 November, with no progress being made at all on 31st Army's front and another heavy toll in casualties.

In December the 359th was removed to the Reserve of the Supreme High Command for rebuilding. In January 1944, it was reassigned to the 1st Ukrainian Front, where it would remain for the duration. To begin with it was assigned to the 47th Rifle Corps in 27th Army, then to 102nd Rifle Corps in the Front reserves, and by 1 April to 23rd Rifle Corps in 60th Army. The division remained in this Army until September, when it was transferred to the 38th Army. At this time, the 221st Antitank Battalion had been reequipped with ZIS-3 76mm guns, three batteries of four guns each, plus an antitank rifle platoon with seven ATRs.

== Siege of Breslau ==
In January 1945, the 359th was reassigned with 76th Rifle Corps from 3rd Guards Army to 6th Army. The division would remain in this Army for the duration, once again coming under the command of Lt. Gen. V. A. Gluzdovsky. During the Lower Silesian Offensive Operation, 6th Army was given responsibility for the siege and capture of Breslau, beginning on 13 February. On 5 April the 359th was recognized for its role in forcing a crossing of the Oder River northwest of the city with the award of the Order of the Red Banner. During the course of the siege, Private Vasily Ivanovich Nechval, a light machine-gunner of the 1198th Rifle Regiment, was noted for his valor in one of the crossing operations in the early stages of the siege, and on 27 June was recognized with the award of the Gold Star of a Hero of the Soviet Union (Medal No. 8154).

== Postwar ==
By the end of the war the division had earned the full title 359th Rifle, Yartsevo, Order of the Red Banner Division: (Russian: 322-я стрелковая Ярцевской Краснознамённая дивизия). On 4 June, in further recognition of its successful service in the final reduction of Breslau the division was awarded the Order of Lenin, a rare distinction for an ordinary rifle division. It was disbanded shortly afterwards in accordance with the 29 May order that created the Central Group of Forces, and its troops used to reinforce the latter.
