= Lyady, Vitebsk region =

Agrotown in Vitebsk Region, Belarus

Lyady Ляды
- Agrotown
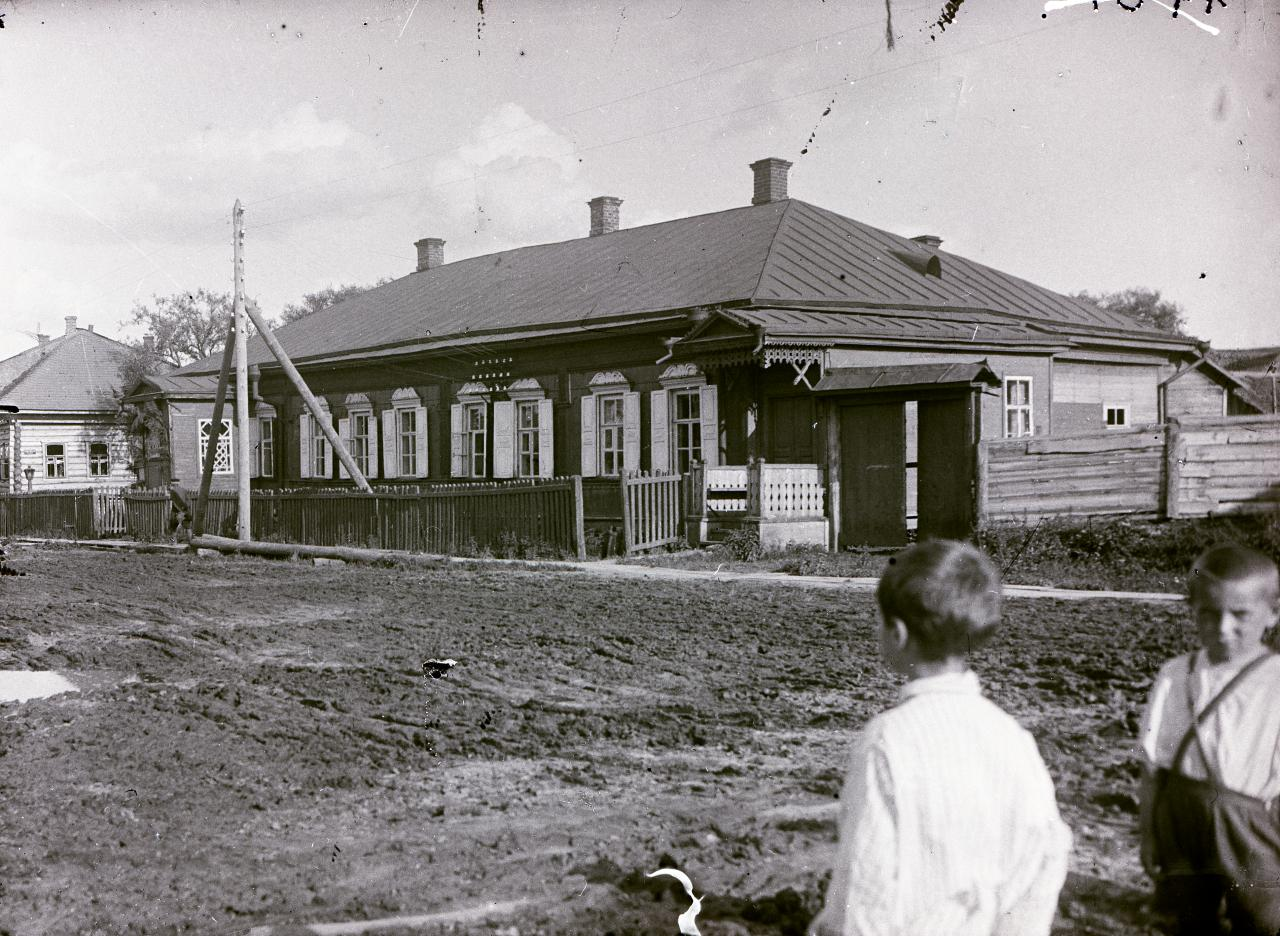
- Lyady post office, 1930

- Location within Belarus
- Coordinates: 54°36′1″N 31°10′4″E
- Country: Belarus
- Region: Vitebsk Region
- District: Dubrowna District
- Founded: 17th century

Population (2019)
  - Total: 396
- Time zone: UTC+3 (MSK)

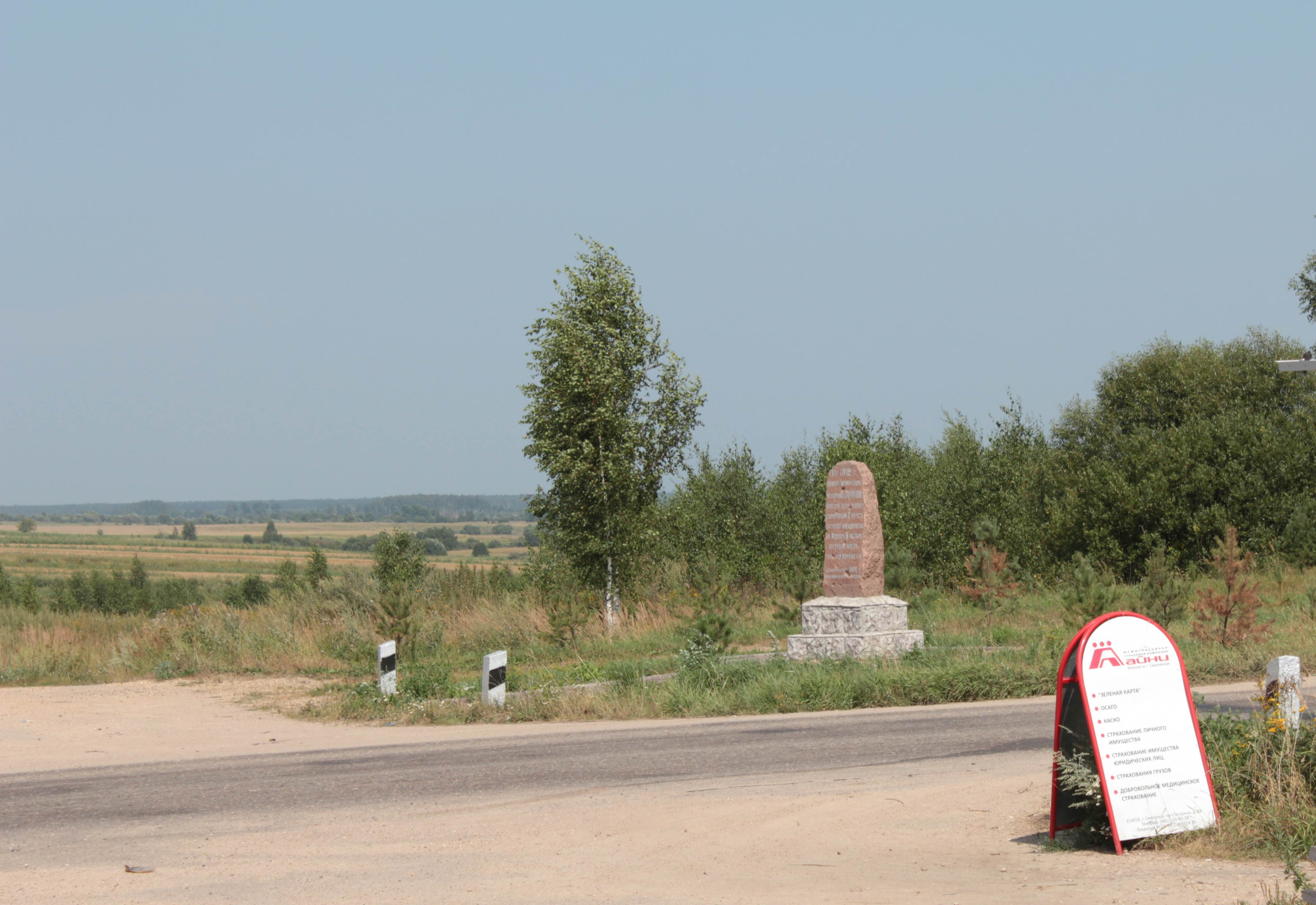
Monument marking Napoleon's 1812 invasion of Russia, constructed in 1918.

Lyady (Belarusian: Ляды; Russian: Ляды) is an agrotown in Dubrowna District, Vitebsk Region, Belarus. It is adjacent to the Belarus–Russia border. Until 2008, it had the status of village. It is part of Valyawki selsoviet.

== History ==
Lyady was founded in the 17th century. It was located on the road connecting Moscow and Warsaw. It is located near the Mereya River, once the border between Russia and Poland and later between the Russian Soviet Federative Socialist Republic and the Byelorussian Soviet Socialist Republic.

During the French invasion of Russia, on 14 August 1812, Ney and his troops crossed the former border into old Russia at Lyady, proceeding toward Smolensk. By 18 November, after the defeat, Napoleon spent a night in the village where they stumbled upon a barn with hens and ducks.

Lyady used to have a predominantly Jewish population, located in the Pale of Settlement. It was a center of Chabad chasidism for over a decade. The first rebbe Shneur Zalman of Liadi settled there at the invitation of Prince Stanisław Lubomirski, voivode of the town, after his second imprisonment in 1800.

After the German occupation of Belarus in the Second World War, the town's Jews were gathered into a ghetto. On April 2, 1942, the Germans and collaborators killed more than 2,000 Jews in the ghetto.

After a six-day battle from October 3–8, 1943, Lyady was cleared of German forces by the reinforced 30th Guards Rifle Division of 10th Guards Army.

== Notable people ==
- Zalman Anokhi (Zalman Yitzhak Aharonson, 1878–1947), Hebrew and Yiddish writer, playwright, and translator
- Reuben Brainin
- Moshe Erem
- Doivber Levin (1904–1931), Jewist Russian writer, member of the Oberiu group
- Shneur Zalman of Liadi
- Sergey Zaryanko
