= 30th Army (Soviet Union) =

- 30-я армия
- Active: 1941–1943
- Country: Soviet Union
- Branch: Red Army
- Type: Combined arms
- Size: Field Army
- Engagements: World War II: Battle of Smolensk (1941); Battle of Moscow; Battles of Rzhev

Commanders
- Notable commanders: Dmitry Lelyushenko; Vladimir Kolpakchi

The 30th Army (Russian: 30-я армия) was a Soviet field army of the Red Army active between 1941 and 1943. It was re-organised to the 10th Guards Army on 16 April 1943.

== History ==
It was formed on 13 July 1941 based on the 52nd Rifle Corps from the Reserve of the Supreme High Command (Stavka). Initially, the 5th Army consisted of the 119th Rifle Division, 242nd Rifle Division, 243rd Rifle Division, 251st Rifle Division (the last two both drawn from NKVD personnel), 51st Tank Division, artillery and other units. The army was built around a solid core of NKVD border guard servicemen. The army's first commander, Major General Vasily Khomenko, was the former commander of the Ukrainian District of NKVD Border Guards.

On 15 July 1941 the army was transferred to the Front of the Reserve Armies and assisted top construct defensive works on the defensive line running through Selizharovo, Olenino, and Vasilievo.

The army fought in the Battle of Smolensk from the end of July to August 1941 and later formed part of the Western Front from 21 July. During the battle, 30th Army troops attacked Dukhovshchina from the region south-west of Bely. The army's attacks on the flanks of the German Ninth Army stopped and sapped the strength of the German forces. Between September and October the army fought in defensive operations around the region southwest of Bely on the Rzhev axis.

On 17 October 1941 army was incorporated to the Kalinin Front and took part in the Kalinin Defensive Operation (5 December 1941 – 7 January 1942).

On 18 November army was again included into Western Front. As its army fought in the Klin-Solnechnogorsk Defensive Operation (15 November-5 December) and from 6 December on in the Klin–Solnechnogorsk Offensive Operation (6–25 December). During the operation 30th Army together with 1st Shock Army liberated Klin (15 December) and destroyed large German units. As a part of Kalinin Front (from 17 December 1941) during January–April 1942 army participated in Rzhev-Vyazma Strategic Operation (8 January-20 April) In the end of operation army troops reached nearly to Rzhev and went on to the defence.

On 1 March 1942 the army consisted of the 174th, 178th, 243rd, 348th, 359th, 363rd, 371st, 375th, and 379th Rifle Divisions, and the 75, 76, 139, 145, 146, 148, 149, 150, 151, 152, 153, and 222nd Separate Ski Brigades.

Later (from 31 August included into Western Front) until the end of 1942 army defended and strengthened its position going from time to time on the offensive.

In March 1943 troops of the army participated in the Rzhev–Vyazma Offensive Operation (2–31 March), subsequently liberating Rzhev and on 1 April reached the line Nefedovschina-Pantiukchy where it stopped to dig into defensive positions.
On 16 April the army was reformed into 10th Guards Army.

== Commanders ==
The following officers commanded the army.

- Major General Vasily Khomenko (July–November 1941 )
- Major General Dmitry Lelyushenko (November 1941–November 1942)
- Major General (promoted to Lieutenant General February 1943) Vladimir Kolpakchi (November 1942–April 1943)

The following officers were members of the army's military soviet (council).

- Brigade Commissar Nikolai Abramov (June 1941-February 1942)
- Major General Yakov Doronin (February 1942-April 1943)

The following officers were chiefs of staffs of the army.

- Lieutenant Colonel Alexander Baderko (June–August 1941)
- Colonel Anton Vinogradov (August–November 1941)
- Major General Georgy Khetagurov (November 1941-December 1942)
- Colonel (promoted to Major General February 1943) Lev Sosedov (December 1942-April 1943)
