= Myareya =

Myareya, Mereya
- Native name: Мярэя (Belarusian); Мерея (Russian)

Location
- Country: Belarus, Russia

Physical characteristics
- Mouth: Dnieper
  - coordinates: 54°39′57″N 31°11′12″E

Basin features
- Progression: Dnieper→ Dnieper–Bug estuary→ Black Sea

The Myareya (Belarusian: Мярэя), alternative transliteration Miareja, or Mereya (Russian: Мерея) is a river in Belarus and Russia. It is a left tributary of the Dnieper. It is 67 kilometres long, runs in a north-north east direction, and partly runs along the border of the two countries.
