= Operation Mars =

1942 Soviet offensive during World War II

- Part of the Eastern Front of World War II
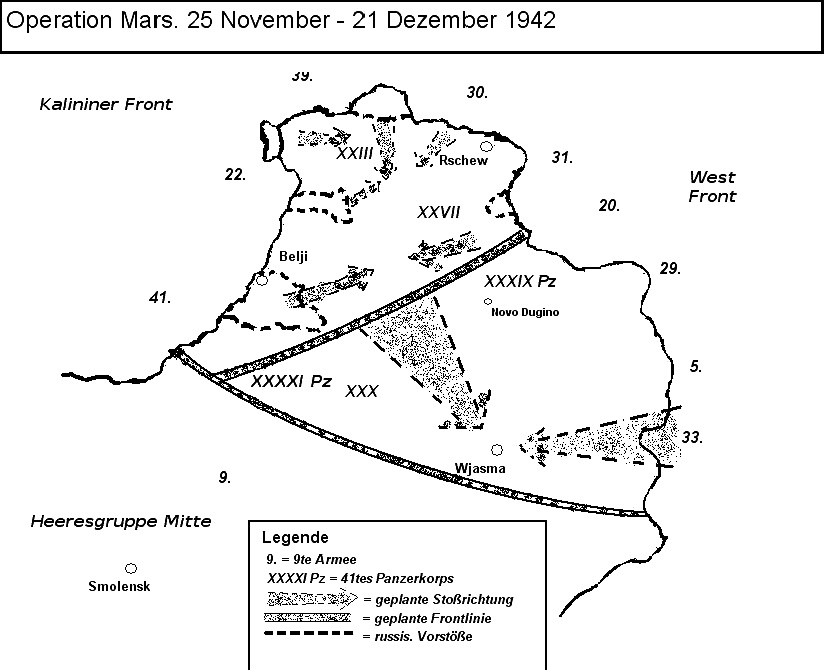
Date	25 November – 20 December 1942
Location	Rzhev and Velikie Luki salients, Russian SFSR
Result	German victory

Belligerents
Soviet Union	Germany

Commanders and leaders
(Soviet Union) Georgy Zhukov (Soviet Union) Ivan Konev (Soviet Union) Maksim Purkayev	(Nazi Germany) Walter Model (Nazi Germany) Günther von Kluge

Strength
702,923 personnel, 1,718 tanks	3 combined corps (with 13 infantry divisions and 2 paratrooper divisions); 2 panzer corps (5 panzer divisions, 3 motorized divisions); 1,615 tanks Total forces: ~350,000 troops

Casualties and losses
Krivosheev: 70,373 irrecoverable 145,301 wounded or sick Glantz: 100,000 killed 235,000 wounded 1,600 tanks	Grossmann: 40,000 combat casualties Buttar: 40,000–45,000 in total

Operation Mars (Russian: Операция «Марс»), also known as the Second Rzhev-Sychevka Offensive Operation (Russian: Вторая Ржевско-Сычёвская наступательная операция), was the codename for an offensive launched by Soviet forces against German forces during World War II. It took place between 25 November and 20 December 1942 around the Rzhev salient in the vicinity of Moscow.

The offensive was a joint operation of the Soviet Western Front and Kalinin Front co-ordinated by Georgy Zhukov. The offensive was one in a series of particularly bloody engagements that are collectively known in Soviet and Russian histories as the Battles of Rzhev, which occurred near Rzhev, Sychevka and Vyazma between January 1942 and March 1943. The battles became known as the "Rzhev meat grinder" ("Ржевская мясорубка") for their huge losses, particularly on the Soviet side. For many years, they were relegated to a footnote in Soviet military history.

== Soviet plans ==
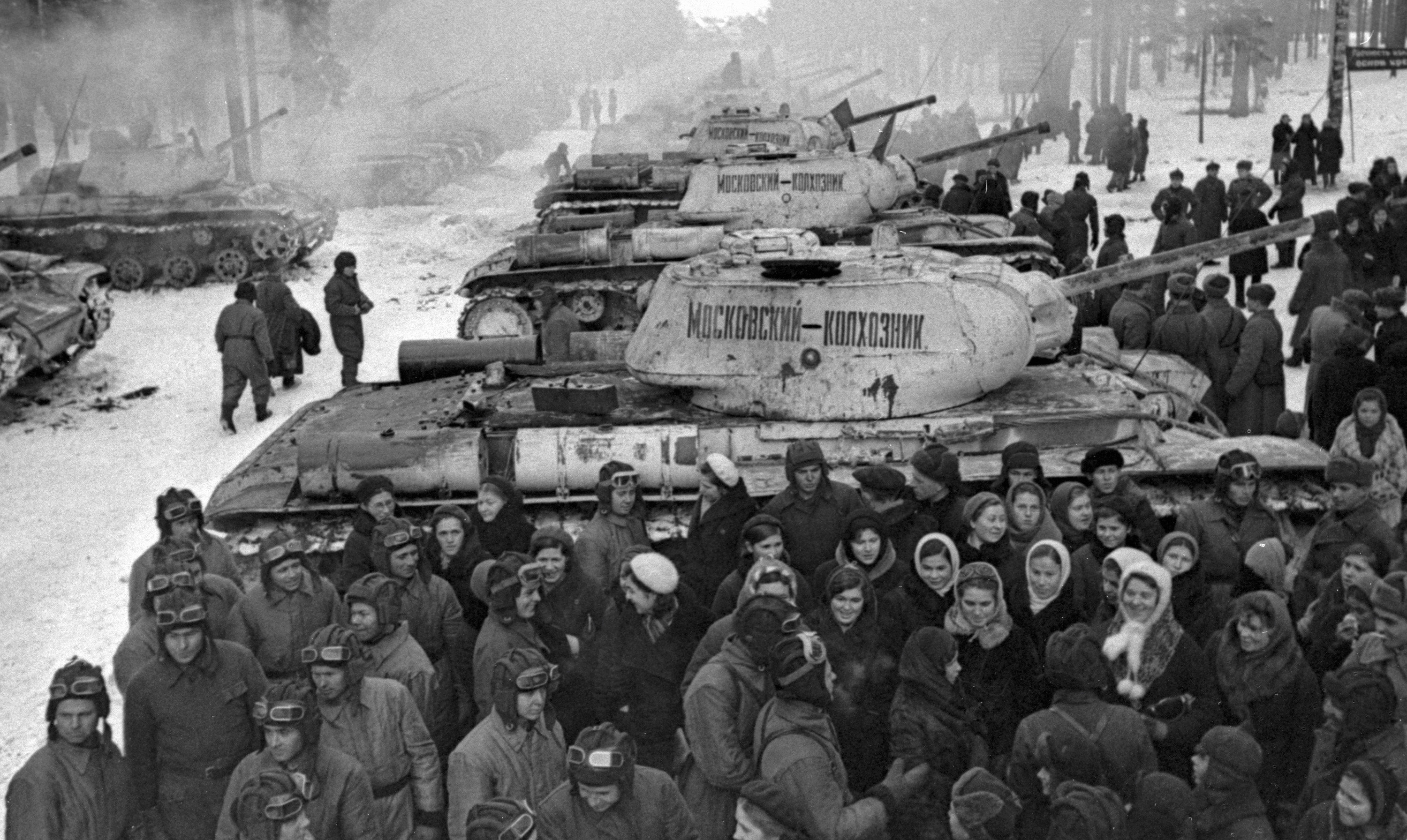
Soviet collective farmers hand over KV-1S tanks to their crews.

In Operation Mars, which was planned to start in late October, forces of the Kalinin and the Western Fronts would encircle and destroy the powerful German Ninth Army in the Rzhev salient. The basic plan of the offensive was to launch multiple co-ordinated thrusts from all sides of the salient, resulting in the destruction of the Ninth Army. The offensive would also tie down German units and prevent them from being moved south.

The Kalinin and Western Fronts were directed by Stalin and Zhukov "to crush the Rzhev-Sychovka-Olenino-Bely enemy grouping." The Western Front was to "take Sychovka no later than the 15th December." The Kalinin Front's 39th and 22nd armies were to take Olenino by 16 December and Bely by 20 December.

Operation Mars was to be followed soon afterward by Operation Jupiter, which was to commence two to three weeks later. The Western Front's powerful 5th and 33rd Armies, supported by 3rd Guards Tank Army, would attack along the Moscow-Vyazma highway axis, link up with the victorious Mars force, and envelop and destroy all German forces east of Smolensk. Once resistance around Vyazma was neutralized, the 9th and 10th Tank Corps, and the 3rd Tank Army would then penetrate deeper into the rear of Army Group Centre.

== Launch of offensive ==
The offensive was launched in the early hours of 25 November 1942. It got off to a bad start, as fog and snowy weather grounded the planned air support. It also greatly reduced the effect of the massive artillery barrages preceding the main attacks by making it impossible for the forward artillery observers to adjust fire and observe the results. The northern thrust made little progress. The eastern attack across the frozen Vazuza River slowly ground forward. The two western thrusts made deeper penetrations, especially around the key town of Belyi. Still, the progress was nowhere near what the Soviets expected.

The German defenders fought stubbornly, clinging to their strongpoints, which were often centered on many of the small villages in the area. In some cases, German strongpoints remained manned for a time after the Soviets advanced past them, creating more problems for the Red Army in their rear areas. Despite repeated, persistent Soviet attacks, German small-arms fire and pre-planned artillery concentrations cut down the attacking Soviet infantry. Soviet tanks were picked off by anti-tank guns and the few German tanks, as well as in close combat with infantry.

One part of a small wood... had been a battlefield; the trees blasted by shells and mines looked like stakes driven in at random. The earth was criss-crossed by trenches; dugouts bulged like blisters... The deep roar of guns and the furious barks of mortars were deafening.

— Ilya Ehrenburg

The relative lack of initial success compounded the Soviet problems. The minor penetrations and the resulting small bridgeheads made it difficult to bring forward reinforcements and follow-up forces, especially artillery so critical for reducing the German strongpoints. The Germans reacted by shifting units within the salient against the points of the Soviet advance and pinching off their spearheads. With limited reserves and reinforcement unlikely due to Soviet offensives elsewhere, the Ninth Army was put under great pressure.

Eventually the shifting of German forces, coupled with Soviet losses and supply difficulties, allowed the Germans to gain the upper hand. Their lines held, and they retook much of the lost ground. The German counterattacks against the Belyi (western) and Vazuza (eastern) Soviet thrusts resulted in several thousand Soviet soldiers being trapped behind German lines. A few of them managed to break through to Soviet lines, some after fighting in the German rear for weeks. The trapped Soviets had to leave almost all of their vehicles and heavy weapons behind. Though the Germans were not able to drive Soviet forces from the Luchesa valley in the northwest of the salient, that was of little significance because the Soviets there were unable to press their attack through the difficult terrain.

== Outcome ==
"The Western Front failed to penetrate enemy defences," according to Zhukov. The Germans were able to hit the flank of the Kalinin Front and trapped Major General MD Solomatin's Mechanized Corps for three days before they were relieved.

Operation Mars was a military failure, and the Soviets were unable to achieve any of their objectives. However, in the aftermath of Operation Mars the commander of Army Group Centre, Generalfeldmarschall Günther von Kluge, recommended the Germans to abandon the salient to economize on manpower and to assume more defensible positions. Adolf Hitler refused. His denial of a major withdrawal in the winter of 1941–1942 had ultimately stabilized the German Army when it was on the edge of a collapse. Subsequently, he was less willing to heed the advice of his commanders. In addition, he was unwilling to give up any ground he had won and saw usefulness in retaining the salient as a starting point for a future thrust upon Moscow. However, in the spring of 1943, his desire to move back onto the offensive made him more receptive to withdrawing forces from the salient to free up manpower for operations elsewhere. A staged withdrawal was begun at the beginning of March 1943. By 23 March, the withdrawal was complete.

Historian A. V. Isayev has pointed out that together with influences on other sectors during the winter of 1942–1943, Operation Mars had an effect upon the strategic situation in 1943. In the plan for the large offensive at Kursk in July 1943, the German Ninth Army was positioned in the southern area of the Orel salient. It assaulted the Kursk salient from the north. However, its losses suffered at Rzhev during Operation Mars resulted in the Ninth Army being short of forces, particularly infantry, and it could not muster enough force to fulfill its task.

== Assessment ==
In the final assessment, Operation Mars was a failure for the Soviet forces. However, among the results of the battle were losses to the reserves of Army Group Center, which reduced the German forces that could be redirected against the more successful Soviet operations against Army Group South in the Battle of Stalingrad. About this matter, German Colonel General Kurt von Tippelskirch commented:

In order to confine the German forces in every sector of the front and prevent the large reinforcement to the critical sectors, and in order to strengthen their [i.e., the Soviet] position in the places which were suitable for future offensives in the following winter, the Russians renewed their offensives in the central sector. Their main efforts focused on Rzhev and Velikye Luky. Therefore, our three panzer divisions and several infantry divisions – which were planned to be used in the southern sectors – had to be kept here to close gaps in the front and to retake lost territories. This was the only method for us to stop the enemy breakthrough.

— Kurt von Tippelskirch

A major area of controversy is whether the operation was intended as a major offensive, or if it was launched simply in order to divert German attention and resources away from Stalingrad, preventing the Wehrmacht from relieving the Sixth Army, or interfering with Operation Uranus. The Soviet forces concentrated for Operation Mars were much larger than the ones used in Operation Uranus around Stalingrad. Military historian David M. Glantz believes that Operation Mars was the main Soviet offensive, while the narrative that it was merely intended to be a diversionary attack was propaganda circulated by the Soviet government to excuse its failure. He described the whole affair as the "greatest defeat of Marshal Zhukov".

In the unlikely event that Zhukov was correct and Mars was really a diversion, there has never been one so ambitious, so large, so clumsily executed, or so costly.

— David M. Glantz

The British historian Antony Beevor disagrees with Glantz by citing that Zhukov spent less time planning Mars than Uranus, and that the Soviet artillery shell allocation was much smaller for Mars than for Uranus. Operation Uranus received "2.5 to 4.5 ammunition loads [per gun]... compared with less than one in Operation Mars." In addition, the Russian historian Makhmut Akhmetovich Gareyev, citing Stavka orders, asserted that the goal of Operation Mars was to tie down German forces in the Rzhev sector, preventing them from reinforcing Stalingrad. Thus, it ensured the success of Uranus and the Soviet offensives in the south.

According to NKVD agent Pavel Anatoliyevich Sudoplatov, Soviet intelligence intentionally leaked the plan of Operation Mars to the Germans as part of a series of deceptive "radio games" named "Monastery" (Монастырь). One of these "Monastery" operations was intended to lure the German attention to the Rzhev sector. During the intelligence operation, a Soviet double agent, Aleksandr Petrovich Demyanov (code name "Heine"), revealed information about a large-scale Soviet offensive in the Rzhev area to convince the Germans that the next major attack by the Red Army would occur in the central sector. Aside from Soviet intelligence, only Joseph Stalin knew about "Monastery".

Zhukov concluded that the main reason Soviet forces were unable to destroy the Rzhev salient "was underestimation of the rugged terrain" and "the shortage of supporting armour, artillery, mortars, and aircraft to pierce the enemy defences." He also did not expect the Germans to bring "up considerable reinforcements to this sector from other Fronts."

== Casualties ==
- Soviet:
  - Isayev:
    70,373 killed
    145,301 wounded
  - Glantz:
    100,000 killed
    235,000 wounded
    1,600 tanks
- German: 40,000 casualties
