= 259th Rifle Division =

259th Rifle Division (July 5, 1941 – June 11, 1946)
- Active: 1941–1946
- Country: Soviet Union
- Branch: Red Army
- Type: Infantry
- Size: Division
- Engagements: Leningrad strategic defensive Staraya Russa offensive operation Tikhvin offensive Battle of Lyuban; Sinyavino offensive (1942); Donbas strategic offensive (July 1943); Donbas strategic offensive (August 1943); Nikopol–Krivoi Rog offensive Odessa Offensive; First Jassy–Kishinev offensive Second Jassy–Kishinev offensive Belgrade offensive
- Battle honours: Artyomovsk

Commanders
- Notable commanders: Maj. Gen. Fyodor Nikolaevich Shilov; Maj. Gen. Afanasii Vasilevich Lapshov; Col. Pavel Petrovich Lavrov; Col. Miron Lazarevich Porkhovnikov; Maj. Gen. Aleksei Mitrofanovich Vlasenko; Col. Terentii Terentevich Belinskii

The 259th Rifle Division was formed from reservists as a standard Red Army rifle division, very shortly after the German invasion, in the Moscow Military District. It was largely based on what would become the shtat (table of organization and equipment) of July 29, 1941. It was assigned to the 34th Army of Reserve Front before the end of July, but this Army was soon reassigned to Northwestern Front. Under these commands it took part in the Staraya Russa offensive operation in August. It suffered significant casualties in its first operation but after falling back toward Leningrad it took part, as part of 52nd Army, in both the defense of Tikhvin and the following counteroffensive that retook the city in one of the first major German reverses. In the new year the 259th was involved in the Lyuban offensive, mostly under command of the ill-fated 2nd Shock Army, and this struggle continued into June. Enough of the division escaped encirclement that it avoided disbandment, and it was sufficiently restored by late August that it was committed to the second Sinyavino offensive, eventually becoming encircled again and forced to break out, at considerable cost. In early October it was withdrawn to the Reserve of the Supreme High Command for a lengthy period of restoration, well into 1943, in 2nd Reserve Army, as it moved well to the south.

The 259th returned to the fighting front on February 2, 1943 as a separate division in 3rd Guards Army of Southwestern Front. It saw limited action before the German Kharkiv counteroffensive threw the Front onto the defensive. It was still in this Army in August when the Front's forces finally broke across the Donets River and advanced into the Donbas, during which the division was awarded a battle honor in early September. Through the fall and into the winter it continued to campaign with 3rd Guards in both the 3rd and 4th Ukrainian Fronts until it was transferred to 6th Army, back in 3rd Ukrainian. It would remain in this Front for the duration of the war. In April 1944 the 259th took part in the advance on Odesa, and was then transferred to 46th Army, where it saw limited action along the Dniestr River into May. When the Second Jassy-Kishinev offensive began in late August the division was part of a special group of forces under 46th Army tasked with making amphibious attacks across the Dniestr estuary and within days took part in the encirclement and elimination of a Romanian/German force in this area. Following this success it advanced into the Balkans where it joined the 37th Army in December, which served as a separate occupation force for the duration of the war. In 1946 it returned to western Ukraine where it was disbanded in June 1946.

== Formation ==
The 259th Rifle Division began forming just over two weeks after the start of the German invasion on July 5, 1941, at Serpukhov, in the Moscow Military District. Its order of battle was as follows:

- 939th Rifle Regiment
- 944th Rifle Regiment
- 949th Rifle Regiment
- 801st Artillery Regiment
- 314th Antitank Battalion
- 336th Reconnaissance Company
- 427th Sapper Battalion
- 683rd Signal Battalion (later 363rd Signal Company)
- 322nd Medical/Sanitation Battalion
- 300th Chemical Defense (Anti-gas) Company
- 68th Auto Transport Company (later 504th)
- 314th Field Bakery
- 517th Divisional Veterinary Hospital
- 308th Field Postal Station
- 567th Field Office of the State Bank

Col. Fyodor Nikolaevich Shilov was appointed to command on the day the division began forming; he would be promoted to the rank of major general 10 days later. This NKVD officer had commanded the Ordzhonikidze School of NKVD troops before the war. As of July 10 the division was still forming up in the Moscow Military District, but as soon as August 1 it had been assigned to 34th Army in Reserve Front.

== Defense of Leningrad ==
On August 6 the 259th was reassigned, with 34th Army, to Northwestern Front. Three days later the German X Army Corps of 16th Army seized Staraya Russa, a vital transportation hub in a nearly roadless region. This left a 48 km-wide gap between it and the II Army Corps at Kholm. In response to an overambitious plan proposed by Lt. Gen. N. F. Vatutin, the chief of staff of the Front, the STAVKA issued orders late that day:

3. The 34th Army will occupy jumping-off positions in the Kulakovo and Kolomna sector along the eastern bank of the Lovat River by the evening of 11 August...
4. Conduct your main attack with the 34th Army and a simultaneous attack by the 11th Army's left flank in the direction of Vzgliady and the 48th Army along the Utorgosh and Peski axis. The 34th Army will deploy one rifle division behind its right flank to protect the junction between 11th and 34th Armies and the 181st Rifle Division behind the junction of the 34th and 27th Armies.
The offensive by all armies will begin on the morning of 12 August.

In the event, this plan was partly preempted when X Corps attacked toward Novgorod on August 10, disrupting the 11th and 48th Armies' attacks.

34th Army, spearheaded by the 202nd and 163rd Motorized Rifle Divisions, joined the 25th Cavalry Division in a lunge that pushed 40 km westward through the German defensive cordon and reached the Staraya Russa–Dno rail line early on August 14. This determined assault enveloped X Corps in Staraya Russa, separated it from II Army Corps on its right flank and threatened the rear of the main German panzer force advancing on Novgorod. The situation was restored by August 22 through the intervention of the LVI Motorized Corps and three days later the 34th and 11th Armies had been driven back to the line of the Lovat. Although suffering heavy losses (from August 10–28 34th Army suffered 60 percent casualties in personnel, 89 percent losses in tanks and 58 percent in other vehicles) the operation delayed Army Group North's drive on Leningrad for another 10 days which may have been decisive in keeping the city in Soviet hands.

While the 259th survived its first battle, General Shilov was not as fortunate. He was severely wounded in combat on August 30 and succumbed to his wounds on September 4. He was replaced on September 1 by Col. Pyotr Vasilevich Borisov, but this officer was in turn replaced on September 20 by Col. Afanasii Vasilevich Lapshov, who had been serving as commander of the 74th Rifle Division's 109th Rifle Regiment. He would be made a Hero of the Soviet Union on March 27, 1942 for his leadership of that regiment in fighting on the Dniestr River, and he would be promoted to the rank of major general on May 13 of that year.

=== Battles for Demyansk ===
Following the Staraya Russa fighting the commander of Army Group North, Field Marshal W. J. F. von Leeb, resolved to ensure that his right flank was secure before beginning the final push on Leningrad. Constant Soviet attacks from the Valdai Hills region enticed 16th Army to keep pushing farther eastward. Given the losses the 34th Army had suffered and the priority for Soviet reinforcements on the Moscow and Leningrad axes there was little it could do to stop this advance, although the 11th and 27th Armies held firm on the flanks. Demyansk was taken in early September, but by now the LVI Motorized Corps was in an absurd position at the end of a single 90 km-long dirt road through swamps back to the railhead at Staraya Russa. LVI Motorized was soon withdrawn in preparation for the renewed offensive on Moscow, and was replaced by II Corps. As winter began to arrive in October the 16th Army's offensive came to a halt and a period of stalemate settled over the area. On October 20 the 259th was transferred north to 52nd Army in the area of Tikhvin.

=== Tikhvin Offensive ===
Tikhvin Offensive. Note position of 52nd Army.

This Army was under command of Lt. Gen. N. K. Klykov. On October 16 two German infantry divisions had stormed across the Volkhov River, followed later in the day by the 12th Panzer and 20th Motorized Divisions of XXXIX Motorized Corps. The assaulting forces penetrated the 4th Army's fragile defenses in four days of heavy fighting in roadless terrain covered by 9–10 cm of snow. This created an immense gap between 4th and 52nd Armies that, given the lack of reserves, the defenders were unable to close. It was in response to this situation that the 259th and other reinforcements were dispatched.

Once reinforced, the two Soviet armies should have been capable of driving the German forces back to the Volkhov. Convinced that this was the case, at 1345 hours on October 26 the STAVKA sent Klykov a blistering directive:

1. The withdrawal of the 52nd Army beyond the Msta and Mda rivers is untimely.
2. The decision to withdraw to the Zelenshchina, Okzovo, Kuz'minka and Zador'e line is incorrect since it is based on unverified aviation reconnaissance data...
3. The army's forces will firmly defend their occupied positions.

However, the two Armies' defenses continued to collapse because they committed their reserves in piecemeal fashion and without adequate support. Once it arrived the 259th joined the 267th and 288th Rifle Divisions in delaying the 8th Panzer and 18th Motorized Divisions long enough to occupy new defenses along the Malaya Vishera River north and south of Malaya Vishera. So strenuous was their defense that, by October 27 the German advance in this sector ground to a halt. At this point, stiffening resistance west of Tikhvin forced a redeployment of these two mobile divisions to Sitomlya to reinforce the main attack.

On October 26, Hitler had insisted that the offensive continue. At the same time the STAVKA was planning a series of counterstrokes to defeat the German forces on the Tikhvin axis. Taking advantage of a vicious blast of cold weather on November 6 that began freezing rivers and streams in the area, the German mobile forces brushed aside the 191st Rifle Division and captured the city in a snowstorm on November 8, cutting the last rail line from Moscow to Lake Ladoga. Despite this success it was clear they had "shot their bolt." The weather and terrain were both taking their toll on vehicles and soldiers alike, and Soviet resistance was stiffening both at Tikhvin and Malaya Vishera. Temperatures had fallen to -40 degrees (C and F) and many soldiers were frostbitten or simply froze to death.

=== Tikhvin Counteroffensive ===
In late November the 52nd, 4th and 54th Armies faced a German force of 10 infantry, two motorized and two panzer divisions deployed between Lakes Ladoga and Ilmen. The German force, whose divisions were at about 60 percent strength, numbered roughly 120,000 men, 100 tanks and assault guns, 1,000 artillery pieces. The STAVKA was able to concentrate 17 rifle and two tank divisions, one cavalry division, and several smaller units, totalling 192,950 men, a considerable superiority in manpower and artillery but a slight inferiority in armor. The main counterattack would be made by 4th Army with one objective being a linkup with 52nd Army at Gruzino. The four divisions (111th, 259th, 267th, 288th) of the 52nd were to destroy the German forces in the Malaya Vishera area, advance to the Volkhov, capture bridgeheads, and help cut German withdrawal routes from Tikhvin.

The counteroffensive began in piecemeal fashion, with 52nd Army initiating the process on November 12. 4th Army joined in on November 19 and 54th Army attacked west of Volkhov on December 3. 8th Panzer, 20th Motorized and the newly arrived 250th Spanish "Blue" Division clung precariously to a string of strongpoints scattered along the overextended right flank of XXXIX Corps, all the way from Tikhvin to Malaya Vishera. General Klykov again mishandled his force, failing to concentrate and making fruitless frontal attacks with inadequate artillery support against the positions of the 126th Infantry Division. The four rifle divisions were spread along a 48 km-wide front, and only two rifle regiments of the 259th were allocated against the essential strongpoint of Malaya Vishera. The only result of the first four days of battle was to convince the OKH to send reinforcements, including the 223rd Infantry Division from France to Malaya Vishera.

Urged on by the STAVKA, Klykov regrouped his forces on November 16 and 17 and resumed his attack overnight on November 17/18. This time he infiltrated two detachments formed from the 259th and 111th Divisions into the German rear area west of Malaya Vishera, and the two divisions successfully stormed and captured the village the next morning. This unhinged the 126th's defenses and forced it to withdraw westward. Although Klykov's forces pursued the retreating force toward Bolshaya Vishera, Gruzino, and Selishchenskii Poselok on the Volkhov, the pursuit was too slow to do much further damage. Nevertheless, this would prove to be one of the first permanent regains of territory by the Red Army. Later, on December 7, the 4th Army reached the outskirts of Tikhvin and early the next day Hitler reluctantly agreed to evacuate the city. 52nd Army continued pushing west, liberating Bolshaya Vishera on December 16.

On December 11 the STAVKA had decided to form a new Volkhov Front, effective December 17, which would contain the 4th and 52nd Armies, which had been under direct STAVKA command, plus the 26th (soon redesignated 2nd Shock Army) and the new 59th Army. This was accompanied by an ambitious plan to accomplish nothing less than the complete lifting of the Leningrad blockade. This proposed Leningrad-Volkhov offensive depended, among many other things, on the establishment of adequate bridgeheads over the river. To Stalin's obvious disgust the commander of the Front, Army Gen. K. A. Meretskov, moved very slowly. 4th and 52nd Armies reached the river near Kirishi, Gruzino and north of Novgorod on December 27. By now utterly exhausted and at the end of their logistical ropes, Meretskov's forces had no choice but to dig in and go over to the defense. The grand new offensive would have to await the new year.

== Battle of Lyuban ==
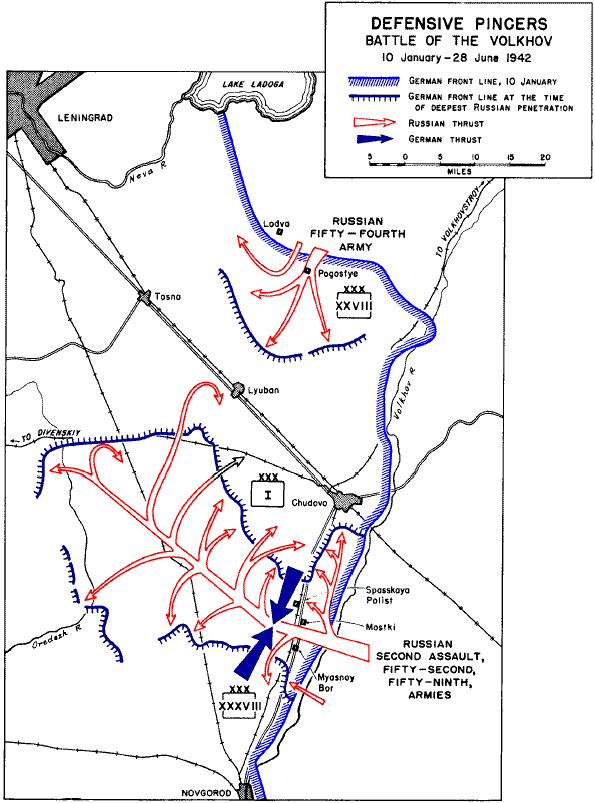
Lyuban Offensive, January 10 – June 28, 1942

Despite delays due to German actions and horrendous weather, Stalin insisted that the offensive begin on January 6, 1942. In the event only the 59th, 4th and 52nd Armies attacked on that date, with 2nd Shock joining in the next day; the 259th had been transferred to this Army just days earlier. In fact none of these forces had completed their concentrations or preparations, with predictable results. From the start, the attackers suffered from acute and persistent ammunition and fuel shortages, unavailability of reserves necessary to exploit success, and poor command, control and communications. 2nd Shock was to begin its assault with the 259th and five rifle brigades. Meretskov signalled the STAVKA at 0700 hours:

The principal difficulties are: the 2nd Shock Army's army artillery has not arrived, its guards divisions have not arrived, aviation is not concentrated, auto-transport has not arrived, ammunition reserves have not been stockpiled, and the serious situation regarding foodstuffs and fuel has not yet been corrected.

2nd Shock and 59th Armies were expected to advance into the frozen swampy wastelands south of Lyuban. The two Armies attempted to penetrate the German defenses along the Volkhov, but the fire was so heavy that 2nd Shock alone lost more than 3,000 men in the first 30 minutes of its assault. Both Armies were forced to retreat to their original positions and struggled fruitlessly for two more days before collapsing in utter exhaustion and confusion. The STAVKA called a three-day halt in the attacks. Stalin's solution, in part, was to send his special emissary, Army-Commissar 1st Rank L. Z. Mekhlis, to supervise Meretskov's attack preparations. Although he was feared and loathed, his role was not altogether negative:

For example, when he learned that the attacking armies were without artillery and that the available guns lacked vital parts, including optical instruments and communications equipment, Mekhlis informed Stalin. Soon, General N. Voronov, the chief of the Red Army's Artillery, was sent to Malaya Vishera with several railway cars containing the missing equipment.

In addition, he immediately recognized the incompetence of the existing commander of 2nd Shock, and had him replaced by General Klykov, former commander of 52nd Army.

After regrouping his forces, Meretskov renewed the offensive early on January 13, this time with something approaching proper artillery preparation. However, ammunition was still in short supply. Attacking across swampy, roadless, and snow-covered terrain in bad weather, none of the attacking forces were able to maneuver freely or to be resupplied. Meretskov repeatedly asked for and received STAVKA assistance; for example, on January 19 he was sent 3,000 PPSh submachine guns and 300 antitank rifles and released nine ski battalions and an aerosan transport battalion to his control. In the 2nd Shock's sector the artillery preparation and subsequent ground assault shattered German defenses at the junction of the XXXVIII Army Corps' 126th and 215th Infantry Divisions, producing panic in the former. In heavy fighting during January 13–16, Klykov's forces managed to carve small wedges in the German defenses west of the Volkhov and Tigoda Rivers. They were not able to capture key German strongpoints, again due to a lack of force concentration. On its flanks the 4th and 52nd Armies failed to record any progress and were soon back on the defense.

On January 21, after a four-day halt for regrouping, 2nd Shock resumed its struggle, this time focusing on capturing the German strongpoints at Spasskaya Polist, Mostky, Zemtitsy, and Miasnoi Bor at the base of the shallow penetration. Meretskov reported early on January 22, in part:

The penetration is developing successfully, albeit slowly, along the 2d Shock and 52d Armies' front. The penetration has developed along a 12-kilometre front from Selishchenskoe village to Krasnyi Udarnik State Farm, which is encircled. The forces have advanced to a depth of 10 kilometres and are approaching the Leningrad road.

He went on to propose a major regrouping of his Front's forces in order to exploit 2nd Shock's and 52nd Army's success. On the night of January 23/24, Meretskov finally convinced himself that Klykov's forces had blasted enough of a hole through German defenses to commit his exploitation force. The next morning the 13th Cavalry Corps lunged through the narrow gap and into the German rear area. However, once the cavalry and some of Klykov's infantry made it through, the XXXIX Motorized and XXXVIII Army Corps hurriedly assembled forces to hold the flanks of the penetration and contain the exploiting 2nd Shock Army south of Lyuban. Meretskov's offensive once again stalled, this time with about 30,000 Soviet troops lodged precariously in the German rear. The 259th was tasked with holding the gap open. At about this time it was transferred back to 52nd Army.

A further effort was made on January 28 after a further regrouping, but 2nd Shock's assaults on Spasskaya Polist and Zemtitsy again failed. Klykov was able to pass most of the rest of his forces through the gap, joining 13th Cavalry Corps, and there were now some 100,000 men in the German rear, but still without any secure communications or supply lines to the rear. In early February, Meretskov prepared a special assault group, consisting of the 11th Rifle Division and 22nd Tank Brigade, which took the German strongpoints at Lyubino Pole and Mostky on February 12. This widened the mouth of the Army's penetration to 14 km. During the following weeks of fighting Klykov was able to expand 2nd Shock's "pocket" west of the Volkhov but was unable to break out decisively toward Leningrad. By the beginning of March the 259th was part of an operational group under command of Maj. Gen. I. T. Korovnikov in 59th Army.

=== Battle in Encirclement ===
In early March, Army Group North began preparing a counterstroke to cut off the Soviet Lyuban force in with an effort to relieve its own II Army Corps encircled at Demyansk. While the ground troops were ready by March 9, the counteroffensive was delayed until March 15 due to the Luftwaffe's commitments elsewhere. When it began at 0730 hours two shock groups totalling five divisions with strong air support attacked from Spasskaya Polist and Zemtitsy toward Lyubino Pole at the base of 2nd Shock's penetration. On the first day the northern shock group gained 3 km and the southern group gained 1,000m. After two days of crawling through boggy terrain against heavy resistance the northern group cut one supply route on March 18 and the southern group severed the second the next day. The two groups linked up on March 20, trapping 2nd Shock in the half-frozen wastes south of Lyuban. The 259th was on the wrong side of the line and by the start of April had been returned to command of 2nd Shock.

Even as the counterstroke was underway, Meretskov frantically formulated plans to thwart it. Despite these exertions, by March 26 German forces had formed outer and inner encirclement lines along the Glushitsa and Polist Rivers. He ordered Klykov to form an operational group to spearhead a breakout to the lines of 52nd Army. This assault by the two Armies, which employed all of his reserves, began early on March 27, and by the end of the day the desperate and costly attacks managed to carve out a narrow gap 3–5 km wide through the German cordon near Miasnoi Bor. With this small victory Meretskov ordered 2nd Shock to begin a new effort to reach Lyuban on April 2. A further attack on April 8 widened the gap to 6 km, but in the meantime the drive on Lyuban had failed again.

By this time the spring rasputitsa had set in, what roads existed became impassable for vehicles, the supply routes through the gap were underwater, and 2nd Shock was running short of ammunition, fuel and food. Command, control and communications within the Army had become impossible. Under these circumstances there was no option but to dig in and await more favorable conditions to resume operations. On April 21 the Leningrad and Volkhov Fronts were regrouped, and Meretskov departed for the front west of Moscow. The previous day he had sent his deputy, Lt. Gen. A. A. Vlasov, into the pocket to replace the ailing Klykov. His mission was to either reinvigorate the offensive or extricate the Army from its perilous position.

By May it was clear to the STAVKA that the latter was the only viable option. Vlasov was ordered to take up an all-round defense, with 13th Cavalry in reserve. The Front commander, Lt. Gen. M. S. Khozin, sent a proposal to the STAVKA that included:

a. Having completed liquidating the enemy in the forests southwest of Spasskaia Polist', the 59th Army will quickly conduct an operation to liquidate the enemy in the Tregubovo, Spasskaia Polist', and Priiutino regions. The 2nd and 377th Rifle Divisions and 29th Tank Brigade will attack from the east, and the 191st, 259th, 267th and 24th Guards Rifle Divisions [will attack] from the west. This operation will tentatively begin on 6 May.

This would focus on the long, narrow salient held by Group Wendel north of the gap, which was the location of the 259th. In further orders the division was subordinated again to 59th Army.

In the event, this tentative date was not met, and on May 12 Khozin notified the STAVKA that Group Wendel was being reinforced, which he took as firm evidence that another attempt to cut the corridor was in the offing. In response, at 2050 hours he ordered Vlasov, and the relevant parts of 59th Army, to begin planning their breakout. His plan, after modifications, was approved in the afternoon of May 16. Heavy, chaotic, but mostly futile combat raged for several days as the ragged remnants of 2nd Shock Army, in large and small groups, tried desperately to reach Volkhov Front's lines. 59th Army could offer little assistance, primarily because its formations were woefully under strength and lacked both tanks and reserves. General Lapshov managed to get out and on May 27 he left the division to become deputy commander of 4th Army. In 1943 he would take command of the 16th Guards Rifle Corps, but would be killed in action on July 14. He was replaced by Lt. Col. Pavel Petrovich Lavrov, who would be promoted to the rank of colonel on July 11. As of June 1 the 259th was officially part of 2nd Shock, but was much the worse for wear, with a total of 755 officers, 825 NCOs, and 3,813 other ranks on strength, about 50 percent of establishment.

The previous day the two German Army Corps had again closed the gap at Miasni Bor. Now totally trapped, the shock groups of 2nd Shock and 59th Armies struck German defenses west and east of the Polist at 0200 hours on June 5. The latter succeeded in reaching the river's east bank but the former faltered and then failed, with German counterattacks penetrating 2nd Shock's positions and seizing several villages. These attacks continued the next day and managed to encircle seven rifle divisions and six rifle brigades north of the former gap, altogether up to 20,000 men. Khozin was dismissed as commander of Leningrad Front and Meretskov given command of the restored Vokhov Front. Starvation was now the greatest threat to 2nd Shock Army. On June 19 a corridor 300m wide was driven through to 59th Army, allowing some men to escape. Another joint attack by the two Armies on June 21 resulted in another 6,000 escaping from the trap overnight. However, that night Vlasov lost communications with Meretskov's headquarters and were never restored. All organized escape attempts ended on June 25 and Vlasov himself soon fell into German captivity. Soviet sources claim that another 9,322 men escaped to Soviet lines singly or in small groups. As late as July 17 Stalin was ordering Meretskov to do all in his power to rescue Vlasov and his command cadre. Enough of the 259th remained that it avoided disbandment, and as of August 1 it was assigned to 4th Army, still in Volkhov Front.

== Second Sinyavino Offensive ==
On July 23, Hitler ordered his 11th Army, which had recently taken Sevastopol with the use of its siege artillery train, to move north and complete the conquest of Leningrad, in an operation that would eventually be named Nordlicht. The STAVKA anticipated such an offensive during mid-summer. In early July Soviet intelligence reported a buildup of German forces in the Sinyavino and Chudovo regions, apparently in preparation for a new drive on Volkhov. The growing fear of German offensive operations prompted the STAVKA to order Meretskov and the new commander of Leningrad Front, Lt. Gen. L. A. Govorov, to conduct a larger scale offensive as a preemptive move and possibly to break the siege. It chose the Germans' Shlisselburg–Sinyavino–Mga corridor, south of Lake Ladoga, as its target. On August 11, Colonel Lavrov was replaced in command of the 259th by Maj. Gen. Mikhail Filippovich Gavrilov. This officer had begun the war in command of the 98th Rifle Division and had most recently been serving as chief of the combat training section of the Volkhov Group of Forces. When the offensive began the division was in 4th Guards Rifle Corps, along with seven rifle brigades; the Corps was directly under Front command and formed Meretskov's second echelon.

East of the Shlisselburg corridor the Volkhov Front attack would be led by 8th Army. The objective was to link up with Leningrad Front. When the offensive preparations were complete the Soviet forces outnumbered the opposing Germans by a factor of better than four to one on 8th Army's 15 km-wide penetration sector. However, the sector had been heavily fortified, and to succeed it had to develop quickly, as the divisions of 11th Army were available as reserves. 8th Army attacked at 0210 hours on August 27, and by the day's end had driven a 5.6 km wedge into the German defenses. The next day the 19th Guards Rifle Division advanced up to 6 km, reaching the southeastern approaches to Sinyavino by nightfall. August 29 saw the inauspicious introduction of the Tiger tank south of the village, with two breaking down almost immediately. Other German reinforcements succeeded in slowing the advance of Volkhov Front.

By this time, Meretskov had already begun to fritter away his second echelon and reserve forces to sustain the advance of 8th Army. He began committing elements of 4th Guards Corps in support of 6th Guards Rifle Corps before August 30. The 259th and a tank brigade went into action on August 29, and the additional rifle brigades joined battle in piecemeal fashion the next day, although too late to affect the penetration, since 8th Army had already been severely weakened. The main attack finally faltered southwest of Sinyavino on September 1–2 with the 8th Army shock group and 4th Guards Corps lodged almost 10 km deep into the German defenses and only 5 km from the Neva River. Meretskov tried to revive the offensive by withdrawing worn units and committing reserves, but it remained stalled. From September 6–9 forces of German XXVI Army Corps began launching counterattacks to regain lost positions. On September 8, General Gavrilov was wounded and hospitalized. He was not released until mid-1943 and did not hold another assignment at the front before his retirement in 1946. Maj. Gen. Nikolai Aleksandrovich Gagen, commander of 4th Guards Corps, took temporary command on September 13.

Hitler now called on Field Marshal E. von Manstein to restore the situation. He concentrated his 24th and 170th Infantry Divisions and 12th Panzer Division to attack the Soviet penetration on September 10, but this attack collapsed almost immediately due to heavy artillery and mortar fire and extensive minefields. Cancelling his planned attacks for the next day, Manstein ordered 11th Army to neutralize the Soviet artillery and prepare another attack from north and south. In a critique from the General Staff on September 15, Meretskov was upbraided for allowing units of the 259th to be committed to battle with no hand grenades. The renewed counteroffensive began on September 21 at the base of the penetration near Gaitolovo and despite desperate Soviet resistance linked up on September 25, encircling the bulk of 8th and 2nd Shock Armies. 4th Guards Corps had been reassigned to the latter.

Belatedly, on September 29 the STAVKA sent Meretskov an order to withdraw his forces from the pocket. During the days following the remnants of the two armies escaped, although fighting persisted until October 15 as the German forces restored their previous front. Leningrad and Volkhov Fronts had suffered 113,674 losses, with most of those falling on the latter, but the German forces had lost an unprecedented 26,000 casualties. Nordlicht was also indefinitely postponed, and would never take place. On October 7, Col. Miron Lazarevich Porkhovnikov took over command of the 259th. On October 14 the division was withdrawn to 2nd Reserve Army in the Reserve of the Supreme High Command for rebuilding, where it remained into the new year, gradually moving to the south.

== Into Ukraine ==
At the start of 1943 the 259th was still in 2nd Reserve Army, where it remained into February. On February 2 it went back to the front as a separate division in 3rd Guards Army of Southwestern Front. It was soon assigned to 14th Rifle Corps. By the beginning of February, 1943 the Army had held a bridgehead over the Northern Donets River south of Voroshilovgrad from which it broke out on February 12 in a drive to liberate that city. Meanwhile, the 8th Cavalry Corps made a spectacular advance, reaching the eastern outskirts of Debaltsevo by nightfall while the 14th and 50th Guards Rifle Divisions, leading the 14th Corps, were still some 60 km to the rear. By the morning of February 14 other units of the 3rd Guards Army, chiefly the 59th Guards and 243rd Rifle Divisions and elements of 2nd Tank Corps, had liberated Voroshilovgrad.

After this victory the 3rd Guards and 5th Tank Armies pressed on towards Stalino. At 0300 hours on February 21 the Front commander, Army Gen. N. F. Vatutin, reported that 14th Corps had "conducted prolonged offensive fighting and, after destroying up to two companies of enemy infantry, advanced and captured Khartsizskaia, Karakash Shakhtaia, and Piatikhatka." However, the day before the German 4th and 1st Panzer Armies had begun the counteroffensive that would become the Third Battle of Kharkov. While this was primarily aimed at Voronezh Front, Southwestern Front also faced attacks and the overall crisis made any further Soviet advance impossible. Colonel Porkhovnikov was killed at his command post by a mortar bomb fragment on February 25, and was replaced by Col. Nikolai Mikhailovich Golovin. By the end of the month the division had left 14th Corps and was again a separate division in 3rd Guards Army. On March 18, Colonel Golovin was relieved of command, and was replaced the next day by Col. Aleksei Mitrofanovich Vlasenko. This officer had been serving as deputy commander of the 243rd Rifle Division and would be promoted to the rank of major general on November 17.

=== Into the Donbas ===
By the beginning of April the division had been moved to 29th Rifle Corps in the same Army. Later in the month it was moved again, now to 32nd Rifle Corps. When July began it was still in this Corps, along with the 266th and 279th Rifle Divisions. Southwestern and Southern Fronts began an offensive on July 17 to force the Donets and Mius Rivers against 1st Panzer and 6th Armies, but this made little progress and was abandoned on August 2. After regrouping, a new effort began on August 13. Southwestern Front struck 1st Panzer south of Izium, as it had in July, and again the German positions held, although at considerable cost in casualties. Southern Front quickly broke through 6th Army when it attacked on August 18, and by August 23 1st Panzer was also in trouble, with only 5,800 men remaining in the army corps south of Izium. On August 31, von Manstein authorized the two Armies to fall back to the Kalmius River.

As the German forces retreated toward Stalino the 259th won a battle honor for its general success in the advance:

ARTYOMOVSK... 259th Rifle Division (Colonel Vlasenko, Aleksei Mitrofanovich)... The troops who participated in the liberation of Donbas, during which they captured Artyomovsk and other cities, by the order of the Supreme High Command of 8 September 1943, and a commendation in Moscow, are given a salute of 20 artillery salvoes from 224 guns.

By the beginning of October the 3rd Guards had run up against a bridgehead that the German forces were attempting to hold on the east bank of the Dniepr east of Zaporizhzhia. The STAVKA demanded that this bridgehead be eliminated as quickly as possible. The Front commander, now Army Gen. R. Ya. Malinovsky, asked for and was granted the use of the 8th Guards Army for this purpose, stating that with it he could take the objective "in two days". The attack began at 2200 hours on the night of October 13 with 8th Guards in the center, 12th Army advancing from the north and 3rd Guards Army from the south. Malinovsky met his deadline with time to spare as 1st Panzer Army's forces abandoned Zaporizhzhia, destroying the dam and the railway bridge as they withdrew to the west bank.

Following the Zaporizhzhia bridgehead battle the 3rd Guards Army was transferred to the 4th Ukrainian Front. This Front had begun a new offensive against the German 6th Army on October 9 with the objectives of liberating Melitopol and cutting off the German 17th Army in the Crimea. The fighting for Melitopol continued until October 23, after which two of the Front's armies drove west across the Nogay Steppe, splitting 6th Army in two. The northern portion fell back toward the Dniepr, forming a bridgehead south of Nikopol which was soon invested by 3rd Guards Army on the right (north) flank of the Front. During November substantial German reserves were moved into the bridgehead in anticipation of an offensive to restore communications with Crimea. This came to nothing in the face of Soviet threats elsewhere, but the bridgehead remained strongly held.

=== Nikopol-Krivoi Rog Offensive ===
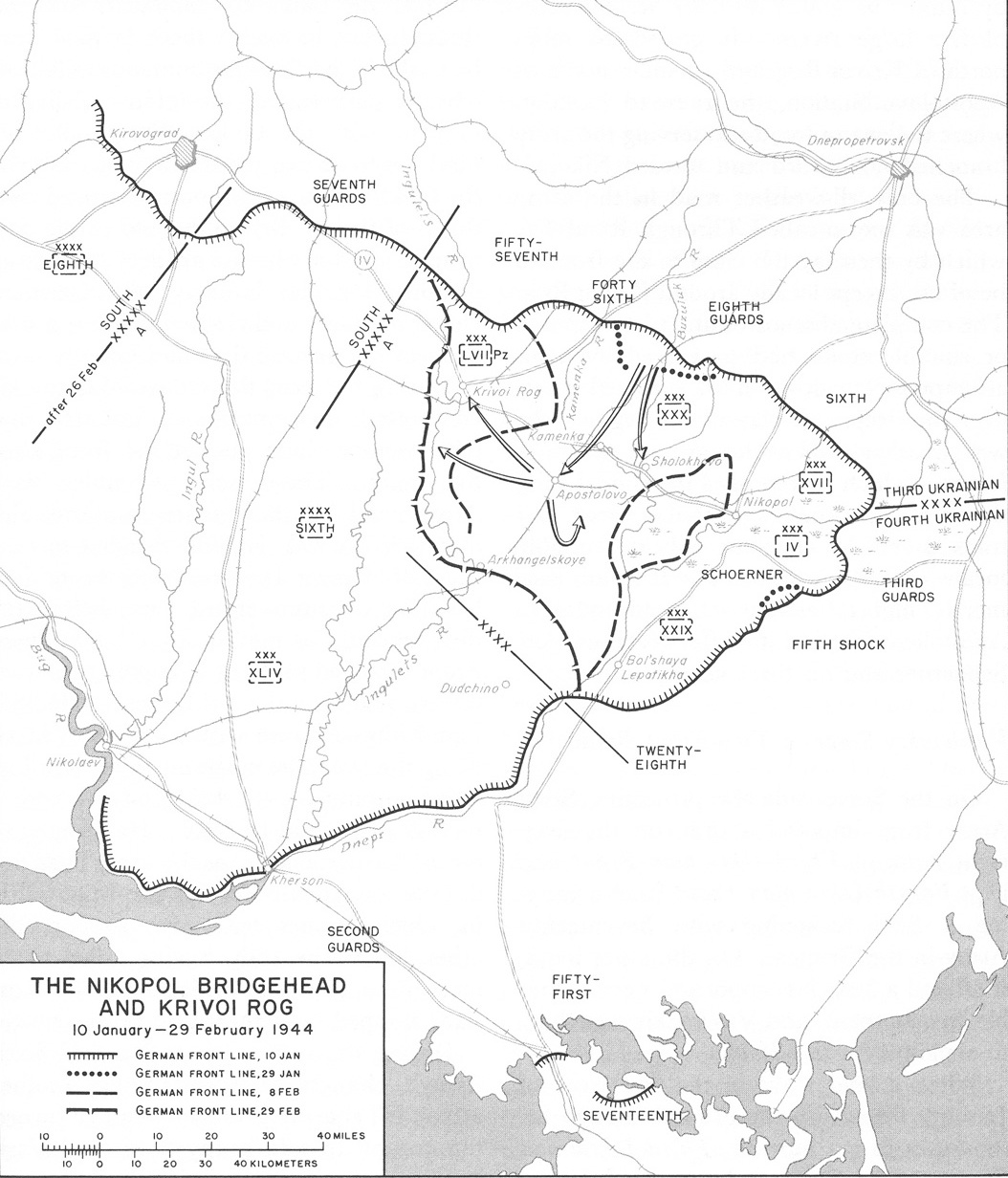
Nikopol-Krivoi Rog Offensive.

A cold wave in the first week of January, 1944 firmed up the ground enough for the 4th and 3rd Ukrainian Fronts to begin moving against the remaining German positions in the Dniepr bend. 3rd Ukrainian began its assault on January 10, but this had largely failed by the 13th. On the same day the 4th Ukrainian attacked the bridgehead but made minimal gains before both Fronts called a halt on January 16. The offensive was renewed on January 30 against a bridgehead weakened by transfers and 4th Ukrainian drove a deep wedge into its south end. On February 4 the German 6th Army ordered the bridgehead to be evacuated. Later that month the 32nd Corps, along with the 259th, was transferred to the 6th Army in 3rd Ukrainian Front.

=== Odessa Offensive ===
With the diversion of 4th Ukrainian Front into the Crimea, 3rd Ukrainian took up the southern flank as the Red Army pressed onward into western Ukraine. On March 26 General Malinovsky ordered a renewed offensive in the direction of Odesa. Prior to this the 32nd Corps (60th Guards, 259th and 266th Rifle Divisions) had been moved to 46th Army in the same Front. On April 4 Cavalry-Mechanized Group Pliyev and the lead elements of 37th Army captured the town of Razdelnaia, again splitting German 6th Army in two. Most of it was soon fighting in isolation or threatened with encirclement and were forced to withdraw slowly and painfully westward through the 37th and 46th Armies' blocking forces. After heavy fighting the 5th Shock Army entered Odesa's northern suburbs on the evening of April 9. Overnight most of the rest of the Front's forces also drew up to the Odesa defenses. With the Soviet trap closing the German LXXII Army Corps began breaking out to the west, allowing the Soviet forces to liberate the city by 1000 hours on April 10 after only minor fighting.

As the Odesa offensive culminated, General Vlasenko had the 939th Rifle Regiment's chief of artillery, Maj. Fyodor Kisleyov, shot in front of the division's officers without trial on April 16, having accused Kiselyov of cowardice on the battlefield. For this incident, Vlasenko was relieved of command on May 22. He was replaced by Col. Terentii Terentevich Belinskii, who would remain in command for the duration of the war.

== Jassy-Kishinev Offensives ==
By the beginning of April the 46th Army was approaching the Dniestr River, the border with the Romanian-held territory of Moldova. On April 8 General Malinovsky ordered the Army to advance as quickly as possible to a wide sector north and south of Tiraspol with the objective of forcing a crossing of the river and capturing several German strongholds on the west bank in support of 37th Army's advance on Chișinău. By early on April 11 the Army was pursuing disorganized German forces across the river with 32nd Corps on its left (south) flank; it reached the river late in the day opposite Olănești with the 259th and 266th Divisions in the first echelon. Its immediate objective was to capture this stronghold but faced several formidable problems in doing so. The Dniestr's floodplain extended up to 5 km east of the eastern bank and was largely under water, while the floodplain on the west bank was less than 1,000m wide and was dominated by high ground of 150m-175m. Despite this the Corps began preparing to cross the next morning. In this effort the 259th and 266th Divisions seized meagre footholds near Olănești but the flooded ground on the east bank hindered and sometimes totally prevented the forward movement of heavy weapons, equipment and ammunition.

General Malinovsky now made plans to renew the offensive on April 19. 46th Army would attack in support of 5th Shock Army's assault on the fortified village of Cioburciu even though it was still facing both strong enemy resistance and deep waters across its front. 32nd Corps faced the 153rd Field Training Division of the German XXIX Army Corps. In the event the inclement weather and associated logistical issues forced the Army to postpone its attack until April 25. When it finally began the 266th Division managed to advance up to 3 km just north of Purcari but nowhere did the advance reach the vital high ground and the offensive ended in stalemate.

By now the 2nd Ukrainian Front was also stalled on the Târgu Frumos axis towards Iași. Malinovsky was ordered to continue the push towards Chișinău sometime between May 15–17. In preparation the 3rd Ukrainian carried out a complex regrouping of its forces to concentrate the 8th Guards and 5th Shock Armies north of Grigoriopol. As part of this movement the 32nd Rifle Corps, now consisting of the 60th Guards, 259th and 416th Rifle Divisions, was transferred to 5th Shock. The regrouping was carried out one rifle corps at a time, given the terrain and logistic restraints, and the 32nd Corps did not begin its move to the north until about May 10. Before the Corps could arrive the 8th Guards Army faced heavy counterattacks by German armor, and the 34th Guards Rifle Corps of 5th Shock Army was almost wiped out in the "bottle" loop of the Dniestr north of Grigoriopol. The best the 32nd Corps could do was to cover the remnants of the defeated divisions as they escaped east of the river. 3rd Ukrainian Front now went over to the defensive.

=== Second Jassy-Kishinev Offensive ===
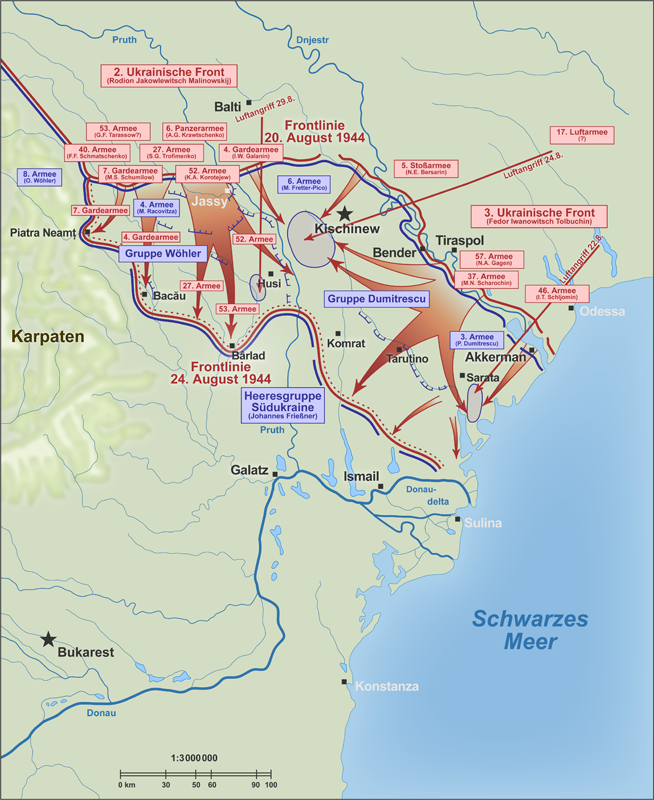
Second Jassy-Kishinev Offensive. Note position of 46th Army.

By the start of July the 259th had left 32nd Corps and had returned to 46th Army as a separate division. 46th Army's front now ran from the western outskirts of Talmaza all the way to the Black Sea coast. In order to carry out a landing operation over the Dniestr estuary a special group of forces was formed under command of the Army's deputy commander, Lt. Gen. A. N. Bakhtin. It comprised the 83rd and 255th Naval Infantry Brigades, a separate motorized infantry battalion from the Danube Flotilla, the 3rd Separate Motorcycle Regiment, 252nd Amphibious Battalion, and other forces. As a separate division the 259th was to operate with this group. The group was to begin the operation on the night before the second day of the offensive. It was to force the estuary in the Akkerman area. At the same time the 259th was to attack from the Belyaevka–Mayaki area in the direction of Moldavka, with the task of assisting in encircling and destroying the Axis forces northwest of the estuary, before attacking to the southwest toward the Cogâlnic River.

The overall offensive began on August 20. Overnight on August 21–22 the 259th captured Palanka. By the afternoon the division had completed its initial mission and was now ordered to launch a concentric attack on Vladimirești, in cooperation with 34th Rifle Corps, to encircle and destroy the German 9th Infantry Division and the Romanian 21st Infantry Division. In order to prevent Axis forces from carrying out an organized withdrawal all the Soviet armies were directed to conduct combat operations by night as well as day. The next day the division came under command of 34th Corps, and was approaching its left flank in the Kaira area. By the day's end 46th Army had encircled the main forces of Romanian 3rd Army, plus the German 9th Infantry, and was approaching the crossings over the Danube. On August 24 most Romanian units ceased to offer resistance, and 34th Corps was tasked with mopping up the encirclement while the remainder of the Army began to exploit into Bulgaria.

== Into the Balkans and Postwar ==
By the beginning of September 34 Corps had been transferred to 57th Army, still in 3rd Ukrainian Front. On September 9, Bulgaria joined the Allies having declared its neutrality five days earlier. Later in the month the Corps came under direct command of the Front, where it remained into November when it was transferred to 37th Army. At the end of the year the 37th became a separate army, not under any Front command, and served as a garrison unit in the Balkans until after the German surrender. The 259th remained in 34th Corps into the postwar.

As of June 10 the division, along with the rest of 37th Army, was part of the Southern Group of Forces, stationed in Bulgaria. By the spring of 1946 it had been resubordinated to 46th Army but was soon moved to the Odesa Military District. It was disbanded under that command on June 11.
