= Gruzino =

Gruzino may refer to:

- Gruzino estate, an estate in Novgorod Oblast, Russia
- Gruzino (rural locality), name of several rural localities in Russia
