= Aleksey Vlasenko =

Soviet Army major general

Aleksey Mitrofanovich Vlasenko
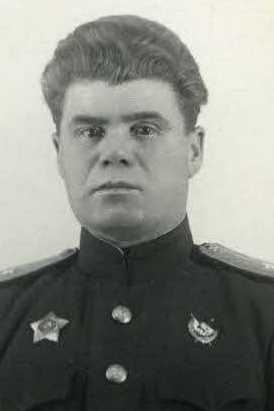
- Vlasenko, c. 1943
- Born: 17 March 1906; Bolshaya Sazanka, Amur Oblast, Russian Empire
- Died: 9 November 1950 (aged 44) Lvov, Ukrainian SSR, Soviet Union
- Allegiance: Soviet Union
- Branch: Red Army (Soviet Army from 1946)
- Service years: 1928–1950
- Rank: Major general
- Commands: 259th Rifle Division; 113th Rifle Division
- Conflicts: World War II
- Awards: Order of the Red Banner (2)

Aleksey Mitrofanovich Vlasenko (Russian: Алексей Митрофанович Власенко; 17 March 1906 – 9 November 1950) was a Soviet Army major general who held divisional commands during World War II.

A student at the Frunze Military Academy when the war began, Vlasenko held regimental and brigade commands during the early years of the war. He commanded the 259th Rifle Division in the advance through Ukraine during 1943 and 1944, but in May 1944 was relieved for ordering the summary execution of a subordinate officer. Demoted to deputy division commander, Vlasenko was given a second chance at division command in December, but after an attempted summary execution he was relieved of command, received a deferred prison sentence and sent back to the front. Vlasenko's conviction was expunged postwar and he continued to serve as a deputy division commander until his suicide in 1950.

== Early life and prewar service ==
A Russian, Aleksey Mitrofanovich Vlasenko was born on 17 March 1906 in the village of Bolshaya Sazanka, Amur Oblast. Conscripted into the Red Army on 2 November 1928, he was sent to the 105th Leningrad Rifle Regiment of the Special Far Eastern Army's 35th Rifle Division as a Red Army man. With this unit, Vlasenko took part in the Chinese Eastern Railway conflict from 1 August to 19 September 1929, fighting in the region of Jalainur. During the conflict, he was accepted to the Omsk Infantry School for command training, entering in September 1929. After graduation in March 1932, Vlasenko remained at the school as a platoon commander. He was transferred to the Ryazan Infantry School in June 1936, serving as a platoon and company commander and assistant battalion commander for weapons training. Vlasenko was accepted to the Frunze Military Academy for advanced training, entering the academy in July 1939.

== World War II ==
After Germany invaded the Soviet Union, Vlasenko, then a major, was released from the academy early in August 1941 and appointed commander of the 765th Rifle Regiment of the 107th Rifle Division. He led the regiment in the Battle of Smolensk and the Yelnya offensive. For its victory in the latter, the division was reorganized as the elite 5th Guards Rifle Division on 26 September, and Vlasenko's regiment became the 765th Guards Rifle Regiment. At the end of the month the division was assigned to the 49th Army, relocated to the region of Kaluga, and by 9 October took up defenses along the east bank of the Ugra river. Subsequently, the division took part in the Vyazma and Mozhaysk-Maloyaroslavets defensive operations during the Battle of Moscow.

In December, Vlasenko took command of the 26th Separate Cadet Rifle Brigade and took part in the counteroffensive in the Battle of Moscow on the Maloyaroslavets axis. From January 1942 the brigade took part in combat operations on the Kalinin Front, assigned to the 2nd Guards Rifle Corps. Vlasenko led the brigade in the Toropets–Kholm offensive. In July Vlasenko, then a colonel, was placed at the disposal of the front Military Council and in August appointed deputy commander of the 243rd Rifle Division. Assigned to the 30th Army, the division took part in the Rzhev–Sychyovka Offensive. From 22 September the division, as part of the 39th Army, took part in fighting to clear the northern bank of the Volga. Reaching the Volga to the right of Rzhev, the 243rd was withdrawn to the Western Front reserve on 1 October. The division was assigned to the 49th Army on 19 November and transferred to the 20th Army on 8 December, taking part in intense fighting to cut the Rzhev–Vyazma railway during Operation Mars. Failing to accomplish the objective, the division went over to the defensive on 14 December. The 243rd was withdrawn to the Reserve of the Supreme High Command on 29 December and on 22 January shifted to the 3rd Guards Army of the Southwestern Front, taking part in the Voroshilovgrad Offensive. During the Voroshilovgrad Offensive Vlasenko acted as commander of the division's 910th Rifle Regiment, and was awarded the Order of the Red Banner for his performance. The recommendation read:

During the battles for Voroshilovgrad from 6 to 14 February of this year, the 910th Rifle Regiment, under the command of Colonel Vlasenko, broke the sustained resistance of the enemy, taking ten settlements, wiping out a series of strongly fortified centers of enemy resistance, skillfully beating back a series of strong enemy counterattacks. In the battles for Voroshilovgrad the regiment took prisoners and trophies. For bold, decisive operations, fine organization of the battle, courage and valor, displayed in the battles with the German occupiers, he is recommended for a state award: the Order of the Red Banner.

Vlasenko took command of the 3rd Guards Army's 259th Rifle Division on 19 March. The division defended a line along the Seversky Donets in the regions of Krasny Liman and Slavyanoserbsk from 8 April. Vlasenko led the division in the advance through Left-bank Ukraine between July and October, in which the 259th took part in the Izyum–Barvenkovo offensive, the Donbas strategic offensive, and the Zaprozhye Offensive. During these operations, the division liberated Zolotoye, Gorskoye, Nikitovka, Artyomovsk, and Popasnya. On 8 September the division received the Artyomovsk honorific in recognition of its performance in the liberation of that city. Vlasenko's division and its parent army were shifted to the 4th Ukrainian Front on 20 October and for the next three months took part in attacks against the German Nikopol bridgehead. Promoted to major general on 17 November, he led the division in the Nikopol–Krivoi Rog offensive and the assault crossing of the Dnieper south of Nikopol between 3 February and 13 March 1944. After a short period of rest to receive replacements, the 259th resumed the attack in the Odessa Offensive on 28 March. Crossing the Southern Bug, the division developed the offensive to the southwest, and reached the Dniester by 9 April, liberating up to 30 settlements. On the night of 13–14 April the division assault-crossed the Dniester in the region of Oloneshty and Korkmaz, seizing a small bridgehead and fighting to hold it. As the offensive culminated, Vlasenko issued an illegal order to execute without trial 939th Rifle Regiment chief of artillery Major Fyodor Kiselyov for displaying cowardice on the battlefield. Kiselyov was publicly shot on 16 April in front of the division's officers. For this incident, Vlasenko was relieved of command on 22 May and placed at the disposal of the Military Council of the 3rd Ukrainian Front.

Vlasenko was demoted to deputy commander of the 19th Rifle Division of the 57th Army on 21 July. He took part in the Second Jassy–Kishinev offensive in this capacity, during which it fought in sustained battles on the Prut and the destruction of encircled troops in the region of Minzhir and Chadyr. The division crossed the Danube on 2 September, entering Romanian territory, and by 8 September reached the Bulgarian border. After taking part in the occupation of Bulgaria, the 19th fought in Yugoslavia and Hungary from 3 October, taking part in the Belgrade offensive and the Budapest offensive.

During the Budapest offensive, Vlasenko took command of the 113th Rifle Division on 4 December. Blaming 157th Penal Company squad leader Captain Vladimir Nosovenko, mounted on horseback, for a delay in the movement of a column, Vlasenko shot and severely wounded him. Having only commanded the 113th for two days, for this incident, he was relieved of command on 6 December. Vlasenko was summoned to Moscow in January 1945 for the investigation of the case by Deputy People's Commissar of Defense Nikolai Bulganin. The Military Collegium of the Supreme Court of the Soviet Union, in a closed session, sentenced Vlasenko to five years of prison with the sentence deferred until the end of the war so that he could be sent back to the front. After conviction, Vlasenko was placed at the disposal of the Military Council of the 1st Ukrainian Front to await further assignment and in May was appointed deputy commander of the 88th Rifle Division of the 31st Army.

== Postwar ==
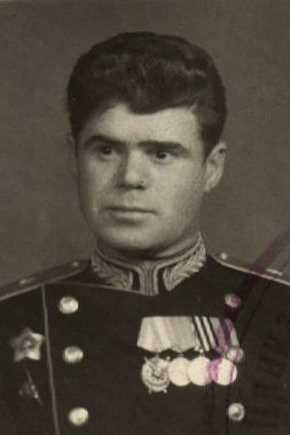
Vlasenko, post-1945

After the end of the war, Vlasenko's conviction was expunged on 7 July, and in August during a reshuffling of commanders he was transferred to serve as deputy commander of the 78th Rifle Division of the Carpathian Military District. He served in the same position with the 206th Rifle Division from January 1946 and the 70th Guards Rifle Division from July of that year. Vlasenko was transferred to the district headquarters at Lvov on 27 February 1947, where he served as deputy chief of the district Combat and Political Training Directorate. Vlasenko committed suicide on the night of 8–9 November 1950.

== Awards ==
Vlasenko was a recipient of the following decorations:

- Order of the Red Banner (2)
- Order of Suvorov, 2nd class
- Order of the Red Star
- Medal "For the Defence of Moscow"
- Medal "For the Victory over Germany in the Great Patriotic War 1941–1945"
