= Tikhvin Offensive =

Military operation undertaken by Nazi Germany during WWII

- Part of Eastern Front (World War II) - World War II
- Maximum German advance (November 12)
Date	German Offensive: October 16 - November 18, 1941; Soviet Counteroffensive: November 12 - December 31, 1941
Location	Tikhvin, USSR 59.643889°N 33.510694°E
Result	Soviet victory

Belligerents
Germany	Soviet Union

Commanders and leaders
(Nazi Germany) Wilhelm Ritter von Leeb (Nazi Germany) Georg von Küchler (Nazi Germany) Ernst Busch	(Soviet Union) Vsevolod Yakovlev (Soviet Union) Kirill Meretskov (Note: Meretskov was released from captivity to replace Yakovlev and take command of the 4th Army on November 9. On December 17 Meretskov would move to command the Volkhov Front, with the 4th Army passing into the hands of P.A. Ivanov.(Glantz, David M. (2002). La batalla por Leningrado (in Spanish). Desperta Ferro. pp. 132–134. ISBN 978-84-946499-7-4.) (Glantz, David M. (2002). La batalla por Leningrado (in Spanish). Desperta Ferro. pp. 142–147. ISBN 978-84-946499-7-4.)) (Soviet Union) Nikolai Klykov (Soviet Union) Mikhail Khozin (Soviet Union) Ivan Fedyuninsky (Note: The 54th Army began with Mikhail Khozin in command; but he exchanged places with Fediuninsky on October 26. Ivan Fediuninsky was then in command of the Leningrad Front since the departure of Georgy Zhukov to Moscow on October 5.(Salisbury, Harrison E. (1969). "The 900 Days: The Siege Of Leningrad". 20 - The Enemy at the Gates. En Da Capo Press. ISBN 978-0060137328.))

Units involved
Army Group North; Volkhov area: I Army Corps; XXXVIII Army Corps; XXXIX Motorized Corps; Leningrad Area: XXVIII Army Corps	Red Army (Note: The Soviet high command readjusted its military structure on July 15, 1941, eliminating the army corps as a unit and assigning divisions directly to armies. This measure was due to the shortage of officers in the Red Army, a product of purges, the rapid military expansion initiated even before the war and the casualties caused in the first days of Barbarossa.(G. Romero, Pablo (2015). Barbarroja 03:00h (in Spanish). Círculo Rojo. p. 389. ISBN 978-84-9095-610-6.) (Glantz, David M.; House, Jonathan M. (2015). When Titans Clashed. How the Red Army stopped Hitler (in Spanish) (Revised and expanded ed.). University of Kansas. pp. 37–44. ISBN 978-0-7006-2121-7.)); Volkhov front: 4th Army; 52nd Army; Novgorod Operational Group; Leningrad Front: 54th Army; 55th Army; Neva Operational Group

Strength
100,000 men in the operation around Volkhov; 80,000 in the defense around Leningrad	300,000 men in all sectors involved

Casualties and losses
45,000 casualties	190,000 casualties (of which 80,000 are dead, imprisoned or missing)

The Tikhvin Offensive was a military operation undertaken by the German army in October 1941 during World War II in the course of Operation Barbarossa. The offensive, conducted entirely around the Volkhov River, was launched by Adolf Hitler with the primary objective of cutting off the supply routes supplying Leningrad. In addition, the German high command intended the deployment of troops in the region to cover the northern flank of the parallel offensive that the Third Reich was launching towards Moscow at that time and also to link up with the allied forces in Finland. The powerful Soviet counteroffensives, added to the accumulated attrition of the German army and the overextension of its logistic network, led to the collapse of the Army Group Norths and the German withdrawal from the occupied ground in the succession of combats.

The Soviet victory at Tikhvin marked their first successful counteroffensive in the sector and allowed Leningrad to continue to hold out in what would become one of the bloodiest sieges in history. The German Army Group North would henceforth not execute any further offensives in the region, being relegated to a defensive role.

== Context ==
Operation Barbarossa, the name given to the German plan to invade the Soviet Union in the summer of 1941, was conceived as an eastward offensive in three directions: Leningrad, Smolensk and Ukraine. For this purpose, Germany dedicated an Army Group to each axis: North, Center and South. Four days later, Finland joined the German offensive, in response to Soviet preventive bombing and with the intention of recovering the ground lost in the Winter War of 1939-1940.

Army Group North ("Heeresgruppe Nord"), composed of three armies (4th Panzer, 16th and 18th), although the smallest of the three, managed in a succession of rapid advances across the Baltic to reach the gates of Leningrad in September. After the capture of Shlisselburg on September 8, the city, besieged by Finns and Germans, had been separated from the rest of the Soviet Union, maintaining as its only link the waters of Lake Ladoga. Although Leningrad, cradle of the October Revolution, was in the eyes of Nazism an important symbolic objective to be destroyed, the Germans found themselves at the arrival of autumn weakened and unable to assault it, with an enemy refusing to surrender and still supplied both by air and via the Lake Ladoga. (Note: Hitler's Directive No. 1a 1601/41 "Concerning the Future Existence of the City of Leningrad" stated that the objective of the siege would be to destroy the city completely by a blockade supported by bombardment.(Glantz, David M. (2002). La batalla por Leningrado (in Spanish). Desperta Ferro. pp. 93–95. ISBN 978-84-946499-7-4.))

== German offensive ==
Following German advances throughout the summer of '41 and with the Battle of Kiev in full swing, Hitler issued Directive No. 35 on September 6, outlining both his plan for the advance toward Moscow and plans for Army Group North, which was to advance eastward to achieve these two objectives:

3. [...] Isolate the Leningrad operational region from the sector along the lower reaches of the Volkhov River. [...] Link up with the Karelian Army at the Svir River after the enemy forces in the Leningrad region have been destroyed.
4. [...] Secure the protection of the northern flank of the Army Group Center advance, in addition to in the advance, on both sides of Lake Ilmen, to link up with the Karelian Army.

— Directive No. 35, Adolf Hitler

The new objectives given to the Army Group North, which had just ceded to the Army Group Centre its 4th Panzer Army and the VIII. Fliegerkorps to contribute to the offensive towards Moscow, caused a crisis between Hitler and Field Marshal von Leeb, responsible for Heeresgruppe Nord, who opposed at first to undertake a new offensive towards the east with his forces depleted and in circumstances that in his opinion were unfavorable for the Germans. The offensive was to take place in a territory 60% covered by swamps and in a season in which it was foreseeable that there would be snow and muddy thaws. To all these disadvantages would have to be added the loss of Finnish support for the Wehrmacht, since after the initial advance of Marshal Mannerheim, who had returned the Finnish border to its pre-Winter War state, Finland had gone on the defensive and even initiated a process of demobilization.

Von Leeb proposed instead an action to destroy the Oranienbaum bridgehead, west of Leningrad, and also an advance to the Ladoga, following the course of the Volkhov, to cut off supplies to Leningrad and destroy the Soviet 54th Army. This second plan was rejected by Hitler, who ordered instead to take Tikhvin, turning northwest, after this city was taken, in the direction of Volkhov, until reaching the Ladoga Lake. Then, if circumstances permitted, they were to advance to the Finnish border at Karelia. Franz Halder, chief of staff of the German army, assessed the plan in his diary as "Pure fantasy!".

To compensate for the units surrendered and the losses suffered since June, it was agreed to send fresh rearguard divisions during the autumn. Thus, from occupied France the 212th, 215th, 223rd, 227th infantry divisions were transferred to the Army Group North, taking advantage of the presence of standard-gauge railway in the Baltic countries; and from Belarus to the 250th (the Spanish "Blue Division"), taking advantage of the fact that it passed near a railroad link with Novgorod.

=== Von Roques Group ===
Simplified original German plan (first phase). - A: Von Roques' plan. - B: Von Leeb's initial proposal. - C: Advance to Tikhvin

In order to make an advance east of the Ilmen to cover the northern flank of the axis towards Moscow, an ad hoc unit ("kampfgruppe" in German terminology) was formed in October consisting mainly of the 126th and 250th Infantry Divisions plus part of the 18th Motorized Infantry Division. This group was given to Franz von Roques, then responsible for the rear of Army Group North.

The maneuver planned for this group consisted of a strong advance on two axes: Malaya Vishera to the north and, further south, the route that crossed the Msta River to the east of Novgorod. Both advances would unite to the east with the final objective of reaching the city of Borovichi. For this purpose, the main assault across the Volkhov in the area of Gruzino was launched on October 16 and on October 19, further south, at Udarnik, by Blue Division troops. While the main assault served both to open the route to Tikhvin and to Malaya Vishera, the Udarnik assault served the function of attracting the maximum number of Soviet forces in order to clear the way for the planned crossing of the Volkhov from the city of Novgorod by the bulk of the 250th Infantry Division.

Although the advances at the bridgeheads were initially rapid, they soon began to attract Soviet counterattacks. On October 27, east of Malaya Vishera, the German advance eastward was halted. Two days later, the Blue Division's diversionary advance, devoid of heavy support in its assaults, was halted in the face of stiff Soviet resistance. On November 1, due to the increasing problems encountered, the scope of the offensive was reduced, leaving the Msta River as the new final objective. Nevertheless, the problematic advance towards Tikhvin at that time and the strong Soviet resistance encountered, forced the von Roques Group to give up the 18th Motorized to help the advance towards Tikhvin and the 126th Infantry Division to hold the defenses of Malaya Vishera. On November 6 von Roques received the order to cancel the expected assault from Novgorod and to pass completely to the defensive. The group was disbanded on November 14, returning its units to the XXXVIII Corps of Friedrich-Wilhelm von Chappuis and bequeathing positions in the bridgehead difficult to maintain.

=== Advance to Tikhvin ===
Following the capture of Gruzino by the 21st and 126th Divisions and after four days of fighting in difficult terrain, the 12th Panzer Division and the 20th Motorized, both part of General Rudolf Schmidt's XXXIX Motorized Corps, launched an advance towards Budogosh causing a gap between the Soviet 4th and 52nd Armies, now separated by the road to Tikhvin. The rapid retreat of the 52nd condensed days later into a strong admonition from Aleksandr Vasilevsky, second in command of the Soviet General Staff, to General Klykov and forced the Stavka to reinforce both armies. On October 23 the Germans would take Budogosh. The seizure was answered by the Stavka ordering, on October 26, the 4th and 52nd armies to initiate a counterattack towards the Tikhvin road, with the aim of driving the Germans across the Volkhov. The counterattack, although it failed due in part to poor coordination, meant that the 12th Panzer Division temporarily halted its advance.

It was during these dates that von Leeb met with Hitler to ask for support from Army Group Centre in the form of an attack from Kalinin towards Bologoye, pushing northwards towards the right flank of Army Group North. Soviet pressure against Kalinin made it impossible to send such relief. Leeb at least got permission to cancel the assault on the Oranienbaum bridgehead west of Leningrad, thus obtaining three divisions from that sector.

The Stavka, before the advance to Tikhvin, ordered a new counterattack of the 4th Army, in which it would employ two shock groups of two divisions each, towards the increasingly closer mechanized forces of Schmidt. This counterattack was a failure, since the German counterattacks, added to their concentration of aviation and artillery, ended up disrupting them. Shortly thereafter, taking advantage of a frost that allowed the rivers to flow, the Germans set out to take over Tikhvin on November 6. The city was occupied in the middle of a snowstorm two days later. Schmidt's XXXIX Corps would from then on be bogged down in the city, going on the defensive in the face of mounting Soviet pressure.

The counterattack against the German advance to Tikhvin was simultaneous with that launched from the Neva River in the direction of Sinyavino, east of Leningrad, with the aim of linking Leningrad back to the Soviet lines. The plan for the Sinyavino corridor involved the Neva Operational Group and the 55th Army, which assaulted along the Neva while Jozin's 54th Army hit the Germans on their eastern flank, leaving the XXVIIIth in the middle of the pincer. The poor results and the difficult situation in Tikhvin forced the Stavka to redirect the effort of the 54th Army to the east, ending the hopes of lifting the encirclement before 42. The confrontation meant that the Germans relocated five divisions to defend the Sinyavino sector. The fighting in the area would be continued the following year in what would become the Sinyavino Offensive.

=== Advance to the Ladoga ===
Simplified original German plan (second phase). - A: Planned advance to Karelia. - B: Planned advance to Ladoga

Formed by units of the 8th and 12th panzer divisions and the 11th and 21st infantry divisions, kampfgruppe von Boeckmann (another ad hoc unit) had as its main objective the capture of Volkhov and to reach the shores of Lake Ladoga, cutting off the last supply route to Leningrad. Another mission of the group would be the defense of the left flank of the increasingly stretched axis towards Tikhvin. The von Boeckmann Group would manage, after a slow advance, to reach within 14 km of Volkhov before being completely halted. Forced by Hitler to maintain the advance, von Leeb reinforced von Boeckmann with the 254th Infantry Division and Schmidt's increasingly weakened motorized corps, bogged down at Tikhvin, with the 61st Division. Reinforced, von Boeckmann maintained an attack from 28 October that succeeded in pushing the Soviet 4th Army eastward, separating it from the 54th, which was defending the axis to the Ladoga, and reaching the Volkhov suburbs on 8 November. Despite being reinforced later with a kampfgruppe of the 8th Panzer, the 4th Army managed, in a desperate attack, to reach the outskirts of Volkhov on November 8. Army managed, in a desperate attack, to block the German flank and stop the offensive.

The presence of mechanized reinforcements in the von Boeckmann Group prompted the Stavka to take action in the sector: he exchanged 4th Army General Vsevolod Yakovlev for Kirill Meretskov; reinforced the 54th Army with five rifle divisions (one of them guard) and a marine infantry brigade; and ordered them to stop the attack to the west, in the direction of Sinyavino, and now to push eastwards, in the direction of the threatened Volkhov.

While Fedyuninsky's 54th Army was preparing to strike at the German forces advancing towards Volkhov, von Boeckmann received another kampfgruppe consisting of elements of the 8th Panzer and also launched an attack with the 254th Infantry Division northwest towards Lake Ladoga, this time on the west bank of the Volkhov River. This effort, which failed due to Fediuninski's quick intervention, was the last attempt of German advance in the Volkhov sector. The balance of forces had changed irreversibly in favor of the Soviets and the Germans were forced to go on the defensive in all sectors.

== Soviet counteroffensive ==
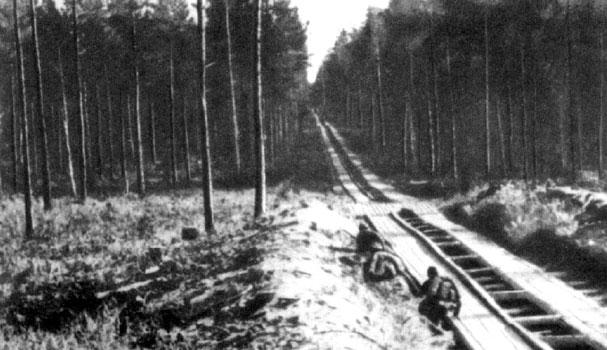
Volkhov front road near the Ladoga. The numerous forests and swamps in the region made control of them vital.

The sharp drop in temperatures at the end of 1941 was the prelude to the harsh winter ahead. This change in the weather had transformed the situation on the front: roads muddied by the effects of rasputitsa were now icy, restoring operational mobility to the armies; rivers, once difficult to ford, had been frozen, allowing infantry to cross them. (Note: The roads in the region used to be paved with wooden logs, which caused bumpy roads that often broke the suspension of the vehicles. When the logs had suffered excessive wear and tear, they lost their bark, causing the wheels to slip and eventually lose their patches due to excessive heat. With the snows, the surface became firmer, but at the cost of becoming especially slippery.(Martínez Esparza, José (1943). Con la División Azul en Rusia (in Spanish). Ejército. pp. 240–241.)) To this should be added the impact of the unexpected Soviet tenacity, the enormous human losses suffered and the poor winter material on the German morale, which was beginning to falter. (Note: Schmidt, the general of the XXXIX Motorized Corps, would comment on December 6, just as his unit was on the verge of collapse at Tikhvin "They have gone beyond the limits of physical endurance...the troops...are becoming apathetic and indifferent...risk of panic..."(Liedtke, Gregory (2016). Enduring the whirlwind. The german army and the Russo-German war 1941-1943 (in Spanish). Helion & Company. pp. 166–167. ISBN 978-1-912390-51-9.)) Even so, the Wehrmacht continued to insist on its push to the east. (Note: Franz Halder commented on November 18 to General von Bock, Commanding General of Army Group Center, "We have to understand that things are going much worse for the enemy and that these battles are more a question of energy than of strategic command."(Citino, Robert M. (2007). Death of the Wehrmacht. The german campaigns of 1942. University of Kansas. p. 45. ISBN 978-0-7006-1791-3.)) Contradicting the traditional German army way of developing an operation, the advance across the Volkhov had been made in fan: the I Corps and the Boeckmann Group to the north, in the direction of Volkhov; Schmidt's XXXIX Motorized to the east, on the axis to Tikhvin; von Chappuis' XXXVIII, stretched and without reserves, covering Schmidt's right flank between Lake Ilmen and Budogosh. (Note: After a month of fighting, the Volkhov front had grown from 70 to 350 km.(Glantz, David M. (2002). La batalla por Leningrado (in Spanish). Desperta Ferro. pp. 132–134. ISBN 978-84-946499-7-4.)) This situation, resulting from the ambitious objectives of the operation, prevented these units from providing mutual support, leaving them vulnerable to counterattacks. With better winter equipment and newly arrived reserves, the Red Army was, in this new situation, prepared to strike back in the form of a counterattack from all points against the German salient.

The Soviet high command devised a plan to form a pincer consisting of the 54th Army to the north and the 4th Army to the east. United at Kirishi, they would destroy the German units at Tikhvin and von Boeckmann's troops at Volkhov. While the pincer was being executed, the 52nd Army and the Novgorod Operational Group would make a frontal assault on the German forces in the Malaya Vishera area to drive them across the Volkhov River and then establish Soviet bridgeheads on the left bank of the river.

Due to logistical limitations and shortage of troops, the operation was carried out gradually and not simultaneously. On November 12, Klykov's attacks began in the Malaya Vishera area, on the 19th Meretskov's 4th Army was launched against Tikhvin, and on December 3, Fedyuninsky's 54th Army began its attack west of the Volkhov.

=== Combat at the bridgehead ===
After beginning to come under pressure from the incessant Soviet attacks, von Leeb asked the OKH on November 16 for a withdrawal from Tikhvin to better defend the sector. The request was rejected, with his boss, Halder, stressing the need to hold the position. To control Tikhvin meant to have annulled the railway line with Volkhov, the point from which vital supplies were sent to Leningrad through the Road of Life.

The right flank of the German axis towards Tikhvin began to be plunged into a succession of frontal attacks by the 52nd Army that forced the German abandonment of Malaya Vishera when Soviet forces took the village of Nekrasovo in an infiltration on November 18, after having made several frontal assaults against the 126th Division. The capture of this village meant, on the one hand, that Bolshaya Vishhera, the town west of Malaya Vishhera, was exposed to Soviet attacks and, on the other hand, that the German units in Malaya Vishhera were liable to be trapped. The 126th was forced to abandon Malaya Vishera and establish defenses in Bolshaya Vishera. The OKH responded to the 126th's hardship by sending the 215th Infantry Division to reinforce the position. Such a withdrawal now left Gruzino's German forces within range of Klykov's attacks, endangering the road to Tikhvin.

It was at this time that the three shock groups of the 4th Army attacked Tikhvin, beginning a slow advance over the snow and in the face of a fierce German defense, which would reach the outskirts of the city on December 7. At the same time, both to the west and south of Tikhvin, heavy fighting to surround the city was pushing the Wehrmacht forces to their limits. (Note: The 18th Motorized Division would have less than 1,000 combat troops at the end of the operation.Glantz, David M. (2002). La batalla por Leningrado (in Spanish). Desperta Ferro. pp. 135–140. ISBN 978-84-946499-7-4. The 12th Panzer Division, also part of the XXXIX Motorized Corps, had only 33 tanks in operational status on December 11.(Liedtke, Gregory (2016). Enduring the whirlwind. The german army and the Russo-German war 1941-1943. Helion & Company. p. 162. ISBN 978-1-912390-51-9.)) German units were precariously holding the axis to the city; but the situation, worsened by weather that was literally decimating their forces, had become desperate by early December: Meretskov had succeeded in penetrating the railroad line south of Tikhvin.

==== Battle of Possad ====
Combat situation between the Blue Division (250th Division) and the 305th Rifle Division at the bridgehead at the end of November. North of Shevelevo was the 126th German division. ⊕: Relief posts

After the assault on the eastern bank of the Volkhov in October, the Blue Division had managed to form a bridgehead of about 5 km and also connect with the German forces advancing further north, at Shevelevo. The Spanish bridgehead, having stagnated since the heavy fighting in the unsuccessful assault on the fortified position of the "Barracks", grew again when it replaced the 30th Regiment of the 18th Motorized at Possad on November 8. (Note: The "Barracks" position was a solid brick building built in the tsarist era in order to attract settlers to the region. The losses suffered there in the frontal assault by the 250th reserve battalion, launched without aviation assistance and with little artillery support, prompted von Roques to order the assault halted on October 28.(Caballero Jurado, Carlos (2016). Atlas Ilustrado. Españoles contra Stalin (in Spanish). Susaeta. pp. 98–99. ISBN 978-84-677-2718-0.)) This regiment had managed to advance to the Vishera River with the idea of heading towards the Msta River, a plan that was discarded when its presence was needed in the advance to Tikhvin. This relief meant that the Spanish division would now be in charge of ensuring the security of the southern end of the Volkhov bridgehead, covering the right flank of the 126th division, a unit engaged in the defense of the Malaya Vishera.

The situation had become complicated for the Spaniards, as they now had to defend a position that could only be reached by crossing a 10 km road through a forest with a strong partisan and Red Army presence. The defense would also have to be made without heavy support or aviation, since the advance to Tikhvin had priority over the rest of the sectors. With most of the division defending the Volkhov and Lake Ilmen (which would soon be passable on ice), Agustín Muñoz Grandes, general of the 250th, could only count on two battalions for the defense of the surrendered positions. It was decided that one battalion would defend the Otensky monastery, located in the middle of the forest, while another would defend the village of Possad, thus controlling the crossroads along the Vishera River.

When Klykov's 52nd Army counteroffensive was unleashed on November 12, the 250th's bridgehead was engaged in a series of battles against the Soviet Novgorod Operational Group. The Novgorod Operational Group had in the sector the 305th Rifle Division, the 3rd Tank Division, three infantry regiments and one artillery regiment. (Note: The 3rd tank division was, after the battles that took place before the encirclement, devoid of tanks and was therefore later converted into the 225th rifle division. The scarce armored means at its disposal were launched against the Possad garrison.(Glantz, David M. (2002). La batalla por Leningrado (in Spanish). Desperta Ferro. p. 150. ISBN 978-84-946499-7-4.)(Caballero Jurado, Carlos (2016). Atlas Ilustrado. Españoles contra Stalin (in Spanish). Susaeta. p. 106. ISBN 978-84-677-2718-0.)) In the face of Soviet pressure it was decided to abandon the Poselok quarter, to build two blockhouses on the road to Possad to control the road and to send a company of reinforcement sappers. The garrison of Possad would spend the rest of the stay continuously harassed by aircraft, artillery and Soviet assaults, being especially critical on December 7, when it was assaulted from all points by armored forces. In the afternoon they managed to penetrate the defenses; but, after accessing the village, they were expelled in a desperate Spanish counterattack with bayonets. (Note: The pessimism was such that, after Muñoz Grandes transmitted the situation to Busch, the 16th Army took for granted the collapse of the Possad and Otensky garrisons.Torres, Francisco (2014). Soldados de Hierro. Los Voluntarios de la División Azul (in Spanish). ACTAS. pp. 306–308. ISBN 978-84-9739-141-2.) The deterioration that was occurring at that time in the German defenses located on the left flank of the 250th ended up making it futile to prolong the defense of Possad, receiving that same day the order to abandon the position. Taking advantage of the darkness, that same night Possad and Otensky were evacuated, retreating in an organized and undetected manner to Shevelevo. On December 9 they would abandon the last positions of the bridgehead. The operation had cost the 250th a 30% casualty rate in combat troops.

=== German withdrawal ===
Simplified situation on the Volkhov front after the counterattacks. End of December.

Heersgruppe Nord is authorized to withdraw the inner flanks of its 16th and 18th armies to the Volkhov River line and the railway line running northwest from the Volkhov station. [...] The mission of the army group is to defend this line to the last man, not to take a single step back, while continuing to besiege Leningrad.

— OKW (German General Staff) December 16, 1941 (Note: Although the withdrawal from Tikhvin was approved by Hitler under Directive No. 39 in the early morning of December 8, the order to abandon the bridgehead was not formalized until a week later.(Glantz, David M. (2002). La batalla por Leningrado (in Spanish). Desperta Ferro. pp. 118–119. ISBN 978-84-946499-7-4.))

Faced with the impossibility of maintaining the positions in the sector, Wilhelm von Leeb ordered the withdrawal during the night of December 7, hours before Hitler gave his approval. Tikhvin would be abandoned on December 9, after a month of occupation, with the German forces fighting desperate battles to avoid being destroyed during their evacuation. Meretskov would pursue Schmidt's motorized corps for the next few days, although the Germans would slow the pursuit by establishing a temporary defense in an intermediate marshy area near Budogosh. Further south, the pressure of the Klykov offensive would eventually drive the Germans out of Bolshaya Víshera on December 16. On December 27 the front would finally reach the Volkhov River, marking the end of the bridgehead.

Meanwhile, in the northern sector of the Volkhov, Ivan Fedyuninsky's 54th Army had begun a slow advance southward, endangering the German I Corps, which was also being harassed on its right flank by Meretskov's 4th Army. The I Corps, forced to abandon its positions, re-drew its line along the Mga-Kirishi railroad. The garrison at Kyrishi, a town on the right bank of the Volkhov, withstood the Soviet assaults and was the only position taken in the operation that was not abandoned by the Wehrmacht. The Red Army would spend the rest of the month trying, with little success, to form bridgeheads on the western bank of the Volkhov to prepare the ground for future offensives.

== Result ==
On Christmas Day von Leeb congratulated his Army Group for the effort carried out in the invasion of the Soviet Union and for the enormous losses inflicted on the Red Army. Shortly thereafter he resigned to Hitler and was replaced by Georg von Küchler, then in command of the 18th Army. Although heavy casualties had been inflicted on the Red Army, the reality was that Leningrad remained under Soviet control and that the Wehrmacht had been unable to cut off the supply routes over Lake Ladoga. The Soviet counteroffensive had been a success and was one of Stalin's first victories in the autumn of 41. Army Group North would spend the remainder of the war in the background of the eastern front, no longer conducting offensives and having low priority when it came to receiving reinforcements. (Note: In 1942, a number of divisions of Heeresgruppe Nord and Heeresgruppe Mitte were forced to disband several of their battalions, with many going from nine to six battalions.(Liedtke, Gregory (2016). Enduring the whirlwind. The german army and the Russo-German war 1941-1943. Helion & Company. pp. 209, 226. ISBN 978-1-912390-51-9.) The situation would be just as bad in material matters: artillery batteries were reduced from four to three pieces; and the number of vehicles and horses was reduced, causing some reconnaissance units to switch to bicycles.(Glantz, David M.; House, Jonathan M. (2015). When Titans Clashed. How the Red Army stopped Hitler (Revised and expanded ed.). University of Kansas. pp. 127–128. ISBN 978-0-7006-2121-7.))

Prolonging the siege also meant that the German army would not be able to rely on the divisions in the sector for other operations. Hitler's frustration with ending the siege would cause him to order Erich von Manstein's 11th Army to withdraw from Fall Blau, the Caucasus campaign of 1942, in order to hasten the fall of Leningrad. Manstein, who had just been promoted to Marshal for his success in the siege of Sevastopol, would be caught up in a new Stavka attempt to liberate the city, the Sinyavino offensive, which would leave him unable to improve the situation in Leningrad.

The Volkhov front stabilized throughout December; but it would suffer a new crisis in January 1942, when the newly arrived 2nd Shock Army crossed the Volkhov between Gruzino and Novgorod in an attempt to liberate the encirclement of Leningrad that would become known as the Lyuban offensive. The offensive would end in the pocketing and subsequent destruction of that army, ending with its general, Andrey Vlasov, captured by the Germans. After the frustrated Lyuban offensive, the front would remain stable until 1944, when the Army Group North, now under the command of Walter Model, retreated west of Lake Peipus, behind the Panther line, abandoning the region due to the collapse of its defensive system.

== Bibliography ==
- Glantz, David M. (2002). La batalla por Leningrado (in Spanish). Desperta Ferro Ediciones. ISBN 978-84-946499-7-4.
- Glantz, David M.; House, Jonathan M. (2015). When Titans Clashed. How the Red Army stopped Hitler (Revised and expanded ed.). University of Kansas. ISBN 978-0-7006-2121-7.
- Citino, Robert M. (2007). Death of the Wehrmacht. The german campaigns of 1942. University of Kansas. ISBN 978-0-7006-1791-3.
- Liedtke, Gregory (2016). Enduring the whirlwind. The german army and the Russo-German war 1941-1943. Helion & Company. ISBN 978-1-912390-51-9.
- Caballero Jurado, Carlos (2009). Atlas Ilustrado de la División Azul (in Spanish). Susaeta. ISBN 978-84-677-0202-6.
- Caballero Jurado, Carlos (2016). Atlas Ilustrado. Españoles contra Stalin (in Spanish). Susaeta. ISBN 978-84-677-2718-0.
- Torres, Francisco (2014). Soldados de Hierro. Los Voluntarios de la División Azul (in Spanish). ACTAS. ISBN 978-84-9739-141-2.
- Díaz del Río, Guillermo (2011). Los zapadores de la División Azul (in Spanish). ACTAS. ISBN 978-84-9739-116-0.
- Martínez Esparza, José (1943). Con la División Azul en Rusia (in Spanish). Ejército.
