= Demyansk Offensive (1943) =

- Part of the Eastern Front of World War II
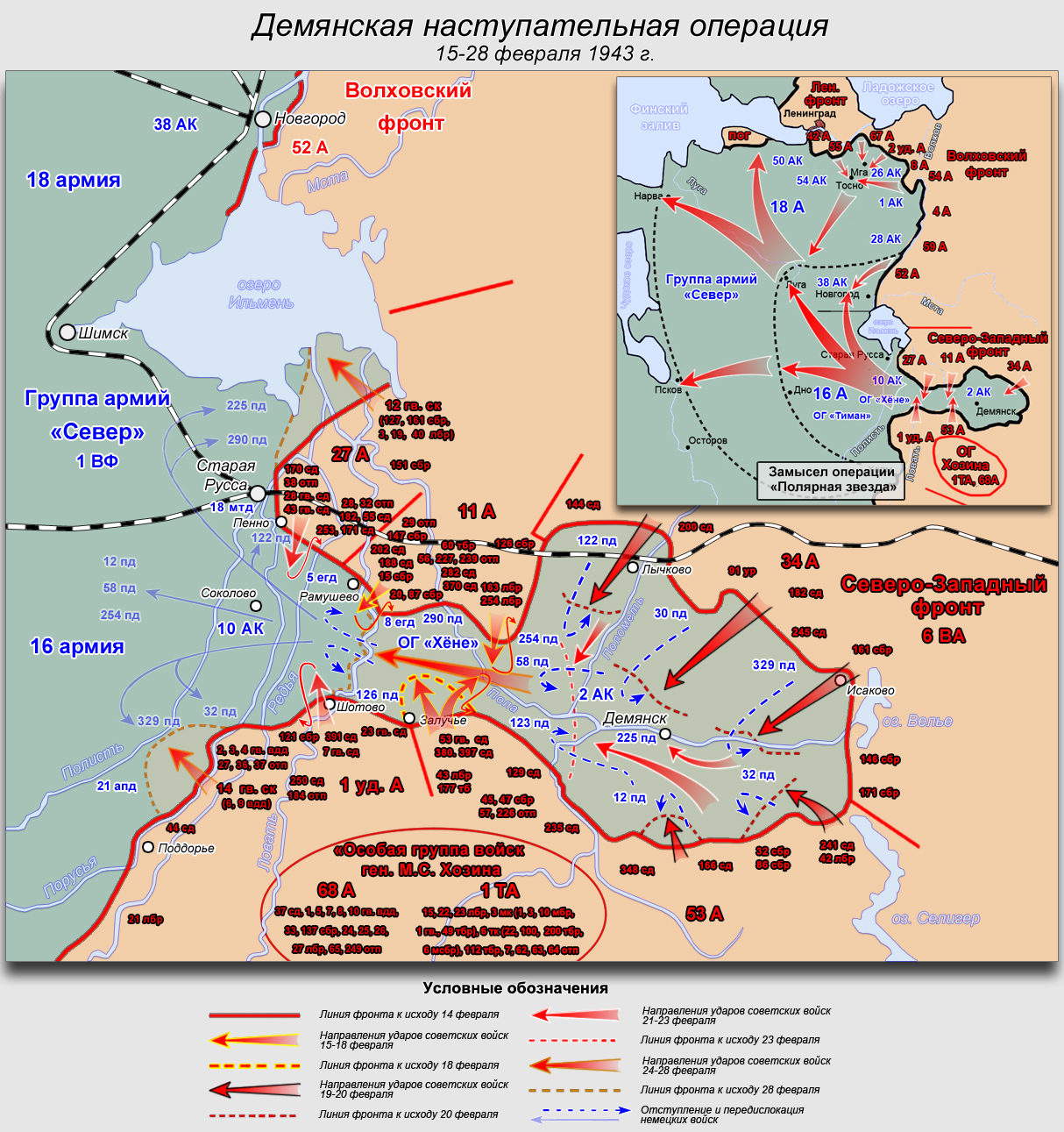
- Positions in the Battle of Demyansk
Date	15–28 February 1943
Location	Demyansk, Novgorod Oblast, near present-day St. Petersburg, Russia
Result	Soviet victory
Territorial changes	Demyansk salient eliminated

Belligerents
(Nazi Germany) Germany	Soviet Union

Commanders and leaders
(Nazi Germany) Georg von Küchler (Nazi Germany) Ernst Busch	(Soviet Union) Georgy Zhukov (Soviet Union) Semyon Timoshenko (Soviet Union) Mikhail Khozin

Units involved
16th Army	Northwestern Front; Mikhail Khozin Special Group; Total: 327,000

Casualties and losses
1,718 killed or missing 5,198 wounded Total: 6,916	10,016 killed or missing 23,647 wounded Total: 33,663

The Demyansk Offensive Operation was part of the Soviet strategic offensive known as Operation Polar Star against Axis forces. The operation took place in Demyansk from 15 to 28 February 1943. The Northwestern Front and Mikhail Khozin Special Group engaged the 16th Army of Army Group North in an operation for control of Demyansk and to destroy Axis forces in the region.

As a result of the Demyansk Offensive, the Northwestern Front eliminated the Demyansk salient, but the original plan of envelopment failed.

== Background ==
At the beginning of 1942, the troops of the Northwestern Front, advancing in the direction of Staraya Russa, had achieved considerable success in encircling the 16th Army in the area of Demyansk. However, they failed to destroy the 16th Army. On 21 April, Kampfgruppe Seydlitz was reopen supply lines to the pocket by opening the Ramushevo Corridor. Soviet troops repeatedly tried to cut the corridor, but the attacks were unsuccessful. In October, Stavka replaced Pavel Kurochkin in command of the Northwestern Front with Semyon Timoshenko. Timoshenko received an order from Stalin to eliminate the German troops in Demyansk.

Due to weather conditions, the new offensive started on 28 November. Fierce fighting lasted for two weeks. Despite the end of the offensive on 23 December, the troops of the Northwestern Front launched a renewed offensive by the 1st Shock Army and 11th Army to cut the Ramushevo Corridor, but by 13 January 1943 were unable to break the German lines. The 34th Army and 53rd Army then attacked, but were also unable to defeat the German forces.

== Preparations ==
In January 1943, the Stavka, fortified by the success of Operation Iskra, decided to undertake a general offensive in the northwestern direction, codenamed Operation Polar Star. It was planned as a joint action of the Northwestern Front, the Leningrad Front and the Volkhov Front, as well as a special group created by Mikhail Khozin, to destroy Army Group North and to relieve the Siege of Leningrad. The coordination of Soviet troops in Operation Polar Star was given to Georgy Zhukov, appointed Stavka representative to the Northwestern Front. The objectives of the units involved were enumerated in Stavka Order No. 30042 and Order No. 30039.

The troops of the 1st Shock Army and 27th Army of the Northwestern Front were to begin the offensive on 19 February, ten days after the start of the Leningrad and Volkhov Fronts. The 34th, 53rd and 11th Armies were to join the attack later. The troops of the 1st Shock Army, advancing to the Ramushevo corridor from the south, were to break through the German defences in the area of Ovchennikov, and move to link up with the 27th Army advancing from the area of Penno and Borisov north of the Ramushevo Corridor. The encirclement would be completed in the area of Onufrieva and Sokolovo. Then, the 1st Shock Army would cut the Ramushevo Corridor, allowing the 27th Army and the Khozin Special Group into the breach, who would attack west and eliminate German forces in the area of Staraya Russa. After this, the 27th Army would be put under control of the Khozin Special Group and in conjunction with the 68th Army and develop the offensive in the direction of Luga, and with the 52nd Army capture Novgorod.

The Northwestern Front troops were also to cut the communications of Army Group North advancing towards Luga, Porkhov and Strugi Krasnye, and to prevent other enemy troops from stopping the Leningrad and Volkhov Fronts. Afterwards, advancing towards Pskov and Narva, Army Group North would be surrounded and then destroyed. To hasten the advance, the Stavka planned to conduct an amphibious operation to capture the strategic rail junction of Dno, for which part of the 68th Army detachment included the 5th Guards Airborne Division.

== Battle ==
The preparation of the Soviet offensive came as no surprise to the German command. Realizing that holding the Demyansk bridgehead would be extremely difficult, Georg von Küchler asked Hitler to allow the withdrawal of troops back to the line of Staraya Russa and Kholm. At first, Hitler refused, but on 29 January changed his mind. The command of the 16th Army immediately began implementing the withdrawal. At the same time, German troops continued to defend their strong positions. The Ramushevo Corridor was particularly strongly fortified, with 1200-1500 mines per kilometer in some places, and pillboxes and bunkers every 300 to 350 meters.

According to the original plan, the Northwestern Front was to attack on 19 February. However, the operation was postponed due to weather and to the Khozin Special Group not being fully concentrated yet. At this point, the Soviet command realized that the Germans were retreating from the Demyansk salient. On 16 February the Germans began to withdraw unnecessary supplies and equipment, and on the 17th the order was given to withdraw the main forces. As a result, Stavka issued an order to attack immediately with the forces already available.

On 15 February, the 11th and 53rd Armies attacked to cut the Ramushevo corridor and the 34th Army attacked to the northeast of Demyansk. Faced with fierce resistance, the Soviet forces failed to cut the corridor and prevent the Germans from retreating. On 20 February, Stavka recommended Zhukov to attack with the 27th Army, 1st Shock Army and Khozin Special Group before the previously planned date due to the German retreat. On 23 February, the 27th Army attacked south of Staraya Russa, and the 1st Shock Army attacked at the base of the Ramushevo Corridor, attempting to prevent the Germans from crossing the Lovat River. By this time, the Germans had vacated most of the bridgehead and Demyansk had been abandoned by the II Army Corps on 22 February. The Soviet troops were still unable to break the German defences and on 28 February the offensive was stopped. On 1 March, von Kuchler announced the completion of the evacuation of 16th Army from the salient, allowing the Germans to condense their defences.

== Aftermath ==
The Demyansk salient was held by the German troops for more than a year, based on a large scale operation to encircle Soviet forces with converging attacks from Demyansk and Rzhev. In March, the Soviet troops caused the Germans to withdraw from the Demyansk salient and retreat across the Lovat. Almost simultaneously, the Germans withdrew from the Rzhev-Vyazma salient. As a result, the possibility of a German attack in the Moscow area was ended. However, the results of the offensive were relatively modest, and the Stavka objectives for Northwestern Front were not achieved. Soviet troops failed to implement the full plan of Operation Polar Star in February 1943. Despite this, Stavka decided to prepare a new offensive to implement Operation Polar Star in March, but with more limited objectives.
