= Mikhail Khozin =

Soviet general

Mikhail Semyonovich Khozin
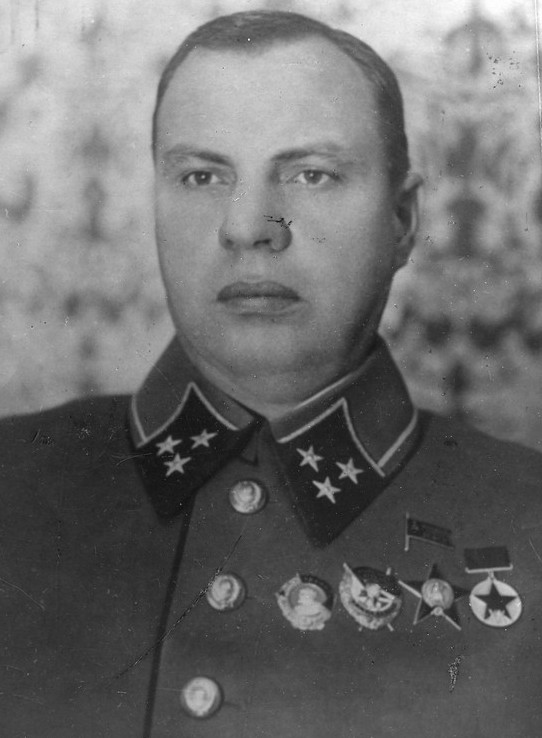
- Native name: Михаил Семёнович Хозин
- Born: 22 October [O.S. 10 October] 1896; Skachikha Village, Kirsanovsky Uyezd, Tambov Governorate, Russian Empire
- Died: 27 February 1979 (aged 82) Moscow, Russian SFSR, Soviet Union
- Allegiance: Russian Empire (1915–1917); Soviet Russia (1917–1922); Soviet Union (1922–1963)
- Service years: 1915–1963
- Rank: Colonel-general
- Commands: 32nd Rifle Division; 34th Rifle Division; 36th Rifle Division; 18th Rifle Division; 1st Rifle Corps; Leningrad Front; 20th Army; 33rd Army; 54th Army; Volga Military District
- Conflicts: World War I; Russian Civil War; World War II; Siege of Leningrad
- Awards: Order of Lenin (twice)

Mikhail Semyonovich Khozin (Russian: Михаи́л Семёнович Хо́зин; 22 October [O.S. 10 October] 1896 – 27 February 1979) was a Soviet general.

He was the commander of the Leningrad Front from October 1941 to June 1942, until he was relieved from command and replaced by Leonid Govorov for failing to relieve the 2nd Shock Army.

== Early life, World War I, and Russian Civil War ==
Mikhail Semyonovich Khozin was born on 22 October [O.S. 10 October] 1896 in the village of Skachikha, Kirsanovsky Uyezd, Tambov Governorate, the son of a railroad worker. He graduated from a parish school in 1907 and a three-year city school in 1911, entering the Saratov Railway Technical School. In August 1915, he was mobilized into the Imperial Russian Army during World War I and enlisted in the 4th Company of the 60th Reserve Infantry Battalion at Tambov as a volunteer. In May 1916 he entered the 4th Kiev School for Praporshchiks for junior officer training. In June of that year he graduated with the rank of Praporshchik and was appointed a junior officer in the 60th Reserve Infantry Regiment.

In late October, he was sent to the 37th Siberian Rifle Regiment of the 10th Siberian Rifle Division, where he was appointed a junior officer in the regimental machine gun detachment. Subsequently, he fought on the Romanian Front with this unit, part of the 6th Army, and was wounded on 18 December 1916. In June 1917, he was appointed regimental head of the intelligence collection, and was elected a member of the regimental committee that month. In August, Khozin was appointed officer for special assignments with the topographical section of the quartermaster general department of the 6th Army. He was demobilized in late 1917.

After returning to his homeland, Khozin worked at the rail junction at the station of Kirsanov as commissar of the track and traffic service of the Kirsanov Rail Junction, simultaneously commanding a workers' detachment tasked with guarding the rail bridge. He was conscripted into the Red Army during a mobilization of party members in November 1918, appointed assistant commander of the 14th Rtishchevo Railroad Regiment. Khozin rose to command the regiment in May 1919, leading it against Mamontov's raid. In late 1919, the regiment was reorganized into two separate battalions, the 34th and 33rd. Khozin continued to command the 34th Separate Rifle Battalion, which remained in Kirsanov and operated in the Borisoglebsk, Voronezh and Tambov sectors. In May 1920 Khozin transferred to command the 194th Separate Rifle Battalion VOKhR, and in October took command of the 294th Rifle Regiment of the 33rd Rifle Division VNUS. He took part in the suppression of the Tambov Rebellion in Tambov, Saratov and Voronezh Governorates.

== Interwar period ==
From February 1921, he commanded the 22nd Separate Rifle Brigade of the Cheka Troops, which guarded the Soviet border with Estonia and Latvia. In October of that year he was appointed commander of the 113th Separate Rifle Brigade of the Oryol Military District. Khozin's brigade was sent to the North Caucasus Military District, where it was assigned to the 28th Rifle Division. Subsequently, he led a regiment of the division in the suppression of anti-Soviet resistance in Terek Oblast between December 1921 and March 1922, and in the disarmament of Chechnya, Ingushetia and Ossetia during November and December 1923.

In January 1924, Khozin was appointed assistant commander of the 22nd Rifle Division at Krasnodar, and that fall went to Moscow to complete the Higher Academic Courses at the Frunze Military Academy. After graduating from the courses, he became commander of the 32nd Rifle Division before taking command of the 31st Rifle Division at Stalingrad in September 1925. In October 1926, he was appointed commander of the 34th Rifle Division at Saratov. He graduated from the political training courses for commanders at the Military-Political Academy in 1930, and was transferred to the Transbaikal in 1932 to command the 36th Rifle Division of the Special Red Banner Far Eastern Army. Khozin was transferred west in May 1935 to command the 18th Rifle Division of the Moscow Military District, and in April 1937 rose to command the 1st Rifle Corps of the Leningrad Military District. Promotions followed quickly for Khozin as he was appointed deputy commander of the Leningrad Military District in December of that year, and in April 1938 succeeded to command the district. He was promoted to the rank of komkor on 22 February 1938, and was appointed chief of the Frunze Military Academy in January 1939. Khozin was promoted to Komandarm 2nd rank on 8 February 1939 and received the rank of general-leytenant when the Red Army introduced general officer ranks on 4 June 1940.

== World War II ==
After Germany invaded the Soviet Union, Khozin was dispatched to hold an operational post in July, becoming deputy commander for the rear of Georgy Zhukov's Front of Reserve Armies. He was made a deputy chief of the General Staff on 4 September, responsible for the Leningrad axis. When Zhukov took command of the Leningrad Front, he brought Khozin with him as his chief of staff on 13 September. Khozin simultaneously commanded the 54th Army from 26 September during operations aiming to break the Siege of Leningrad in the region of Kolpino. After Zhukov departed the Leningrad Front Khozin succeeded him in command on 27 October. Khozin led the front during the Tikhvin defensive and offensive operations, and in April 1942 took simultaneous command of the Volkhov Group of Forces, reduced in status from the previously independent Volkhov Front. For his failure to relieve the 2nd Shock Army, Khozin was relieved of command in June and appointed commander of the 33rd Army, fighting on the Vyazma axis. He served as deputy commander of the Western Front between October and December. Zhukov selected Khozin to lead the 20th Army on 7 December, replacing the dismissed Nikolay Kiryukhin as the army prepared for Operation Mars. Khozin's army was tasked with attacking the German defenses on the Vazuza river bridgehead, and due to the understrength, demoralized and inexperienced conditions of his units Khozin's plan for the offensive relied on a frontal attack. The army suffered heavy losses in a series of costly attacks and the offensive culminated by mid-December. Khozin was replaced in command of the army and appointed Stavka representative to the 3rd Tank Army, serving in this capacity during the Ostrogozhsk–Rossosh offensive. In January 1943 Khozin was promoted to the rank of general-polkovnik. Khozin commanded the Special Group of Forces created to eliminate the German Demyansk salient in the Demyansk Offensive between February and March. Khozin's group reported directly to Stavka and operated in the zone of the Northwestern Front. Khozin became deputy commander of the Northwestern Front in April, and transferred to hold the same position for the Western Front. He was dismissed from this position by a Stavka order on 8 December for inactivity and an unserious attitude to his duties. In March 1944 he was appointed commander of the Volga Military District in the rear, remaining in this post for the rest of the war.

== Postwar ==
Postwar, Khozin was relieved of command of the Volga Military District in July 1945, considered unfit for his position. After a year at the disposal of the Main Cadre Directorate awaiting his next assignment, he was appointed to a non-operational post, chief of the Military-Pedagogical Institute in July 1946. Khozin remained in military academy posts for the rest of his career, and was transferred to serve as chief of the Military Foreign Languages Institute in February 1954. He was shifted to serve as chief of the Higher Academic Courses at the Voroshilov Higher Military Academy in November 1956, and in November 1959 became head of a department of the academy. Retired in November 1963, Khozin died on 27 February 1979 in Moscow and was buried in the columbarium of the Vagankovo Cemetery.
