= Gruzino (rural locality) =

Gruzino (Russian: Грузино) is the name of several rural localities in Russia:

- Gruzino, Leningrad Oblast, a village in Kuyvozovskoye Settlement Municipal Formation of Vsevolozhsky District of Leningrad Oblast
- Gruzino, Novgorod Oblast, a selo in Gruzinskoye Settlement of Chudovsky District of Novgorod Oblast
