= Kirsanovsky Uyezd =

Kirsanovsky Uyezd (Кирса́новский уе́зд) was one of the subdivisions of the Tambov Governorate of the Russian Empire. It was situated in the eastern part of the governorate. Its administrative centre was Kirsanov.

== Demographics ==
At the time of the Russian Empire Census of 1897, Kirsanovsky Uyezd had a population of 263,102. Of these, 98.8% spoke Russian, 0.8% Belarusian, 0.1% Yiddish and 0.1% Ukrainian as their native language.
