= Bolshaya Sazanka =

Bolshaya Sazanka Большая Сазанка
- Selo
- Location within Amur Oblast Location within Russia
- Coordinates: 51°10′N 128°09′E
- Country: Russia
- Region: Amur Oblast
- District: Seryshevsky District
- Time zone: UTC+9:00

Bolshaya Sazanka (Russian: Большая Сазанка) is a rural locality (a selo) and the administrative center of Bolshesazansky Selsoviet of Seryshevsky District, Amur Oblast, Russia. The population was 607 as of 2018. There are 8 streets.

== Geography ==
Bolshaya Sazanka is located on the Zeya River, 23 km northwest of Seryshevo (the district's administrative centre) by road. Voronzha is the nearest rural locality.
