= Bolshaya Vishera =

Bolshaya Vishera Большая Вишера
- Posyolok
- Location within Novgorod Oblast Location within Russia
- Coordinates: 58°55′N 32°5′E
- Country: Russia
- Region: Novgorod Oblast
- District: Malovishersky District
- Time zone: UTC+03:00

Bolshaya Vishera (Russian: Большая Вишера) is a rural locality (a village) in Malovishersky District, Novgorod Oblast, Russia. 1,458 (2010 census);

During the Second World War, after a relatively short occupation, Bolshaya Vishera was liberated by forces of the 52nd Army on December 16, 1941.
