= Gruzino estate =

Estate near Chudovo, Russia

Coordinates: 59°8′50″N 31°53′14″E

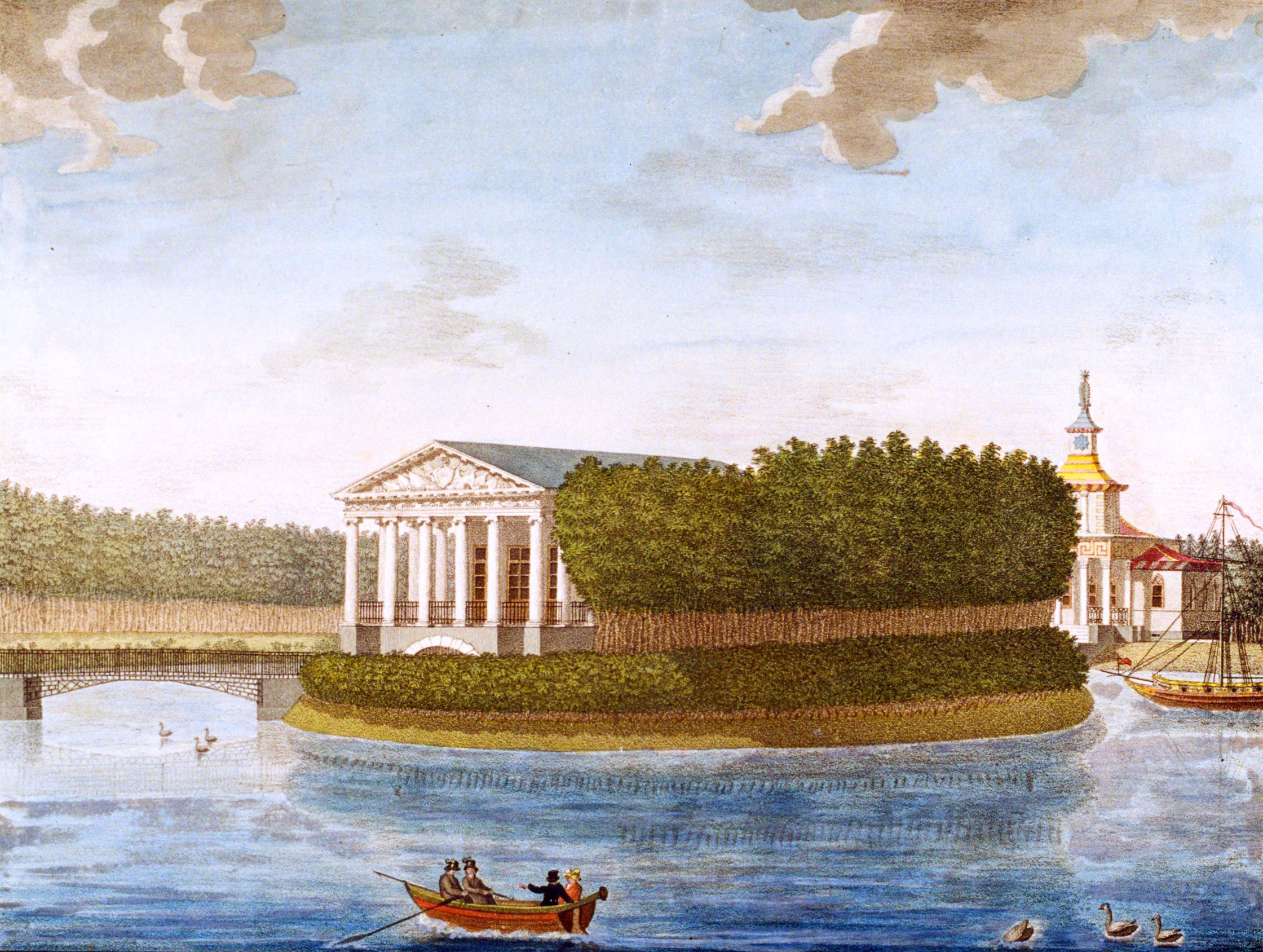
Chinese Pavilion in Gruzino, 1822

The Gruzino (Russian: Гру́зино) estate near Chudovo, Russia, was constructed by a team of Neoclassical architects under Vasily Petrovich Stasov for Count Alexey Arakcheyev in the 1810s.

Count Arakcheyev chose Gruzino as an imperial gift from Emperor Paul when Arakcheyev was appointed Commandant of St. Petersburg, though the area was in disrepair. He was given the land despite prior claim to it by the governor of the Novgorod and Tver provinces. Using serf labor, Arakcheyev built Gruzino to one of the most up-to-date estates in Russia at the time. The celebrated sculptor Ivan Martos contributed a statue of Emperor Paul. Two months after Arakcheyev's death, Emperor Nicholas gave the estate to the Novgorod Cadet Corps.

Although it is stated officially that the manor was destroyed by the Nazi German troops during the World War II, other sources maintain that the estate was wiped out in the 1930s, during Joseph Stalin's industrialisation process. The statues of Medici lions formerly adorning the porch are all that remains from this Neoclassical ensemble. They were transported and mounted for display in the Novgorod Kremlin.

== Gallery ==
=== Gruzino in old photographs ===
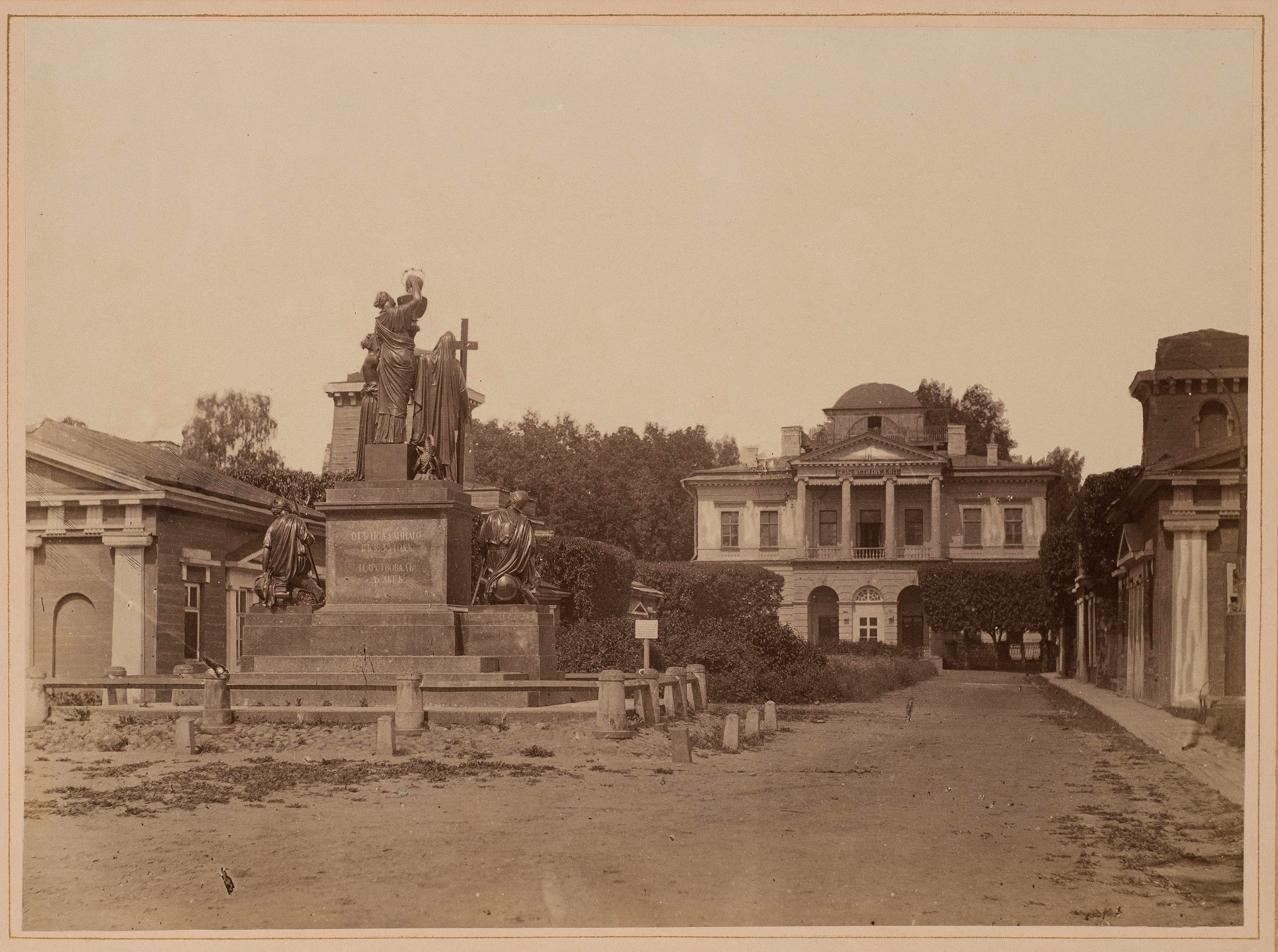

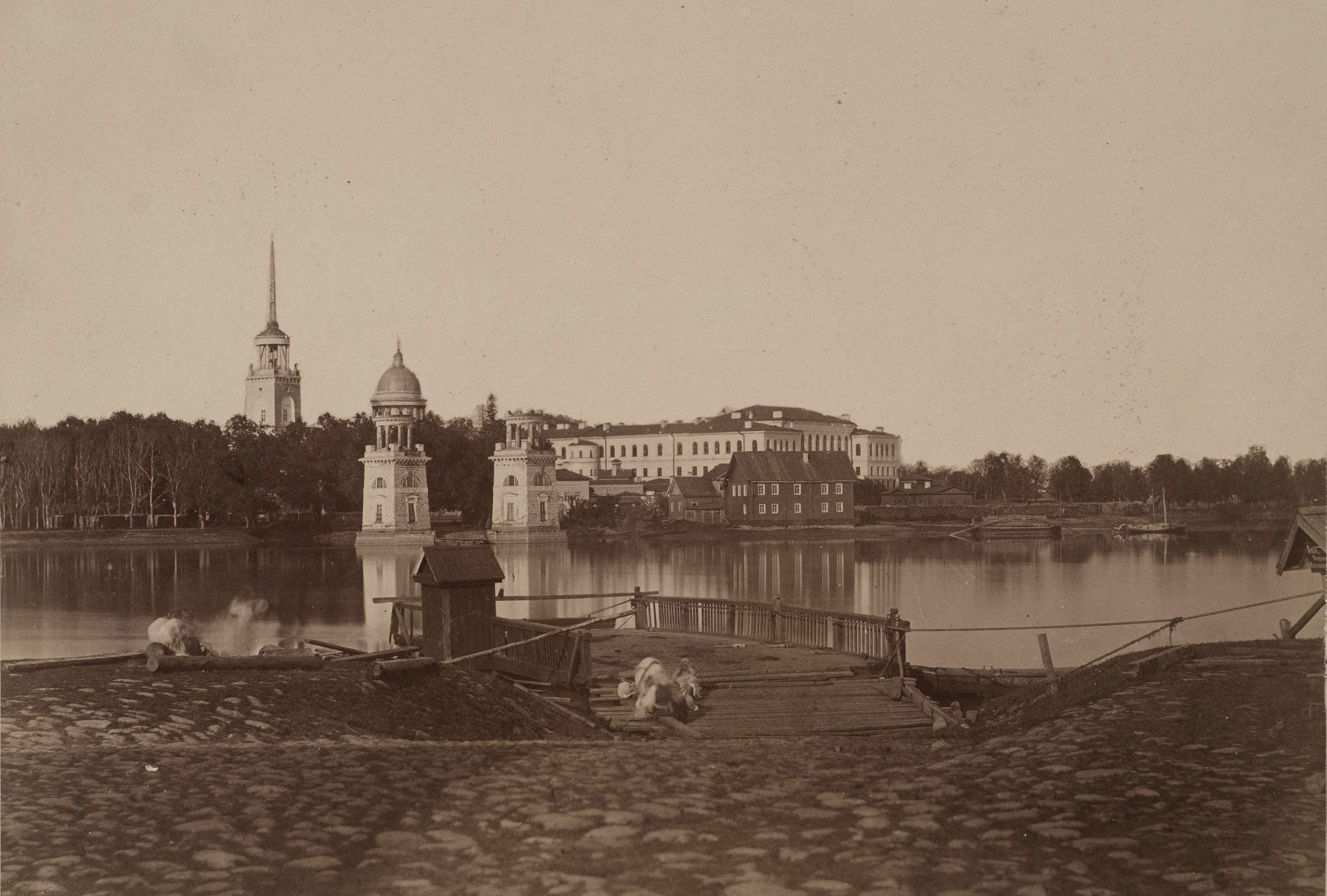

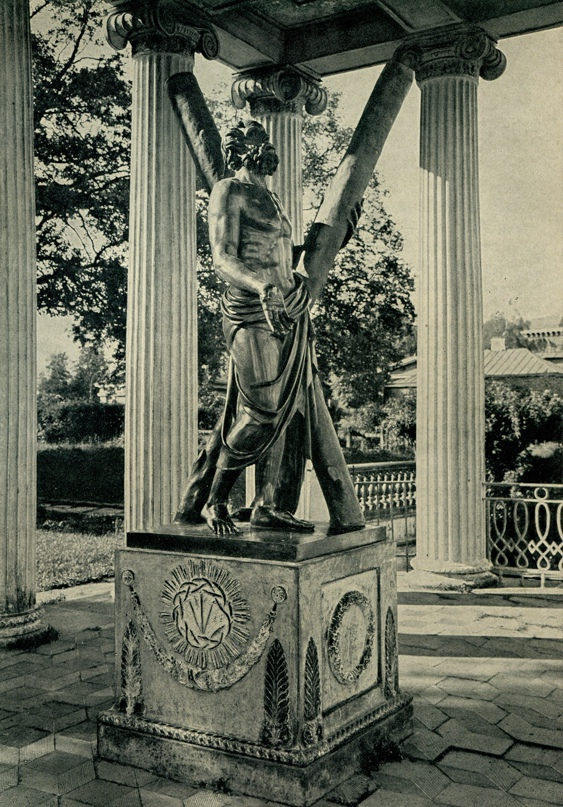

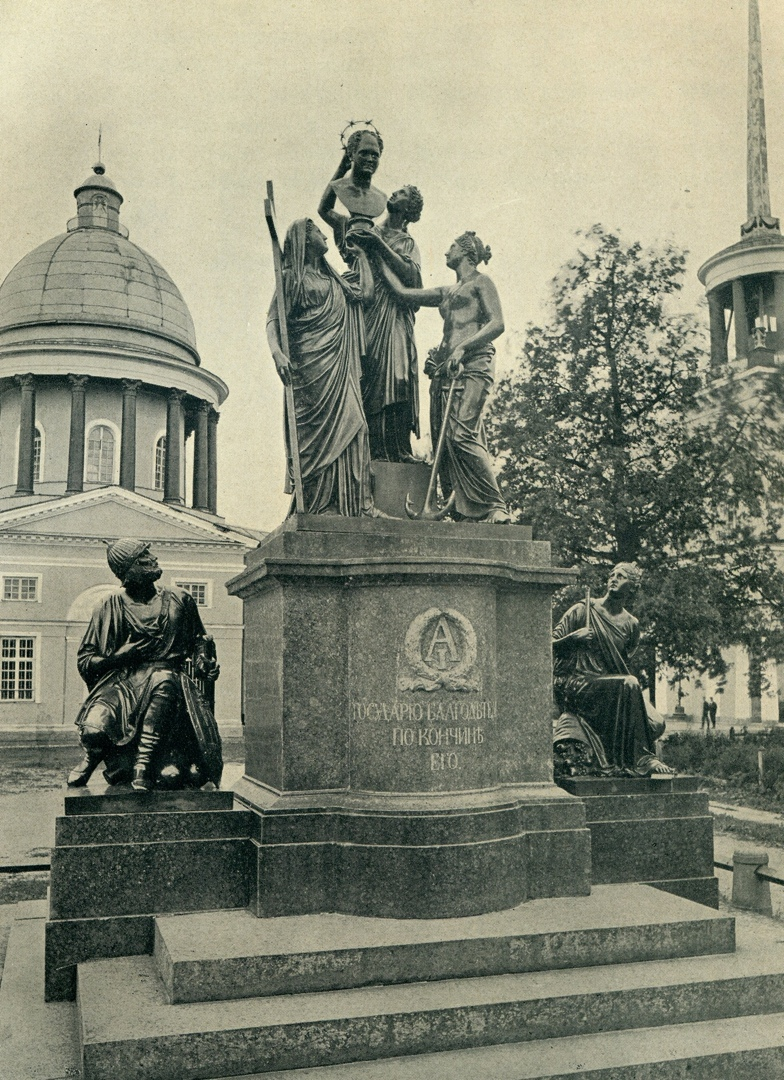

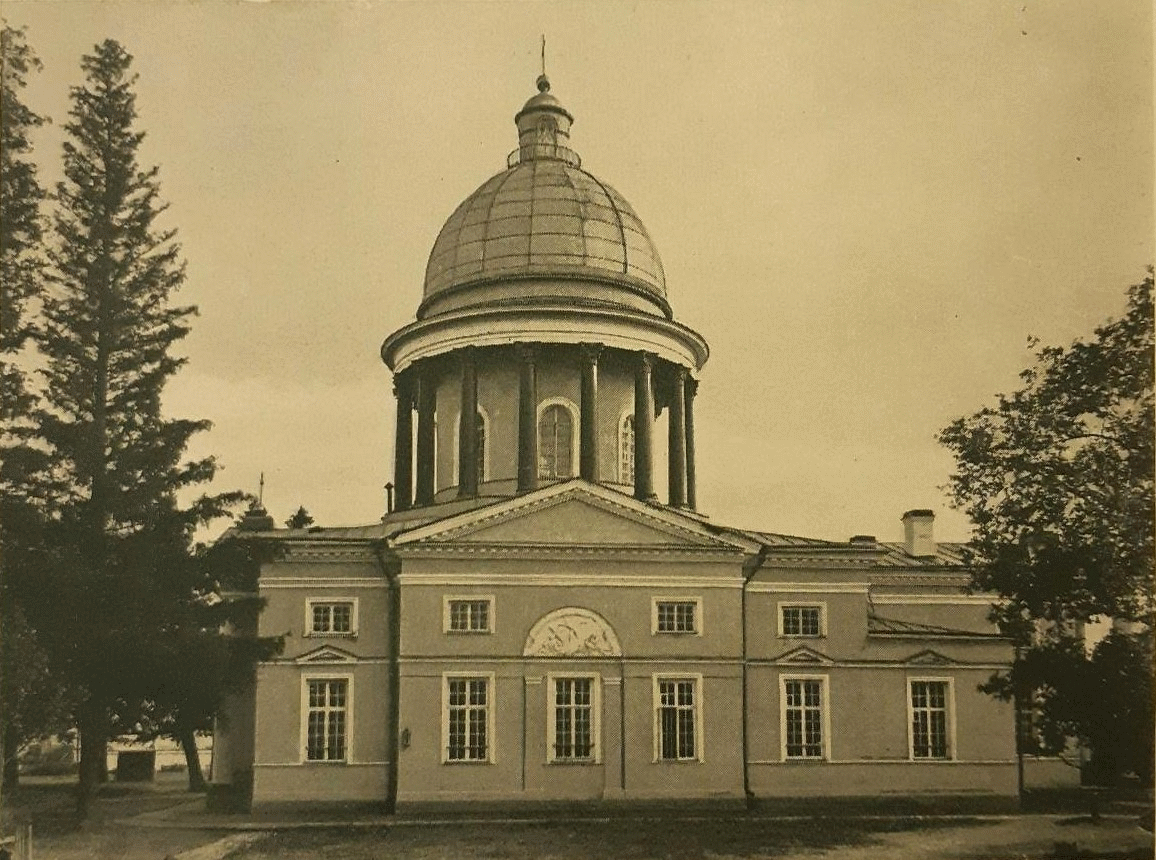

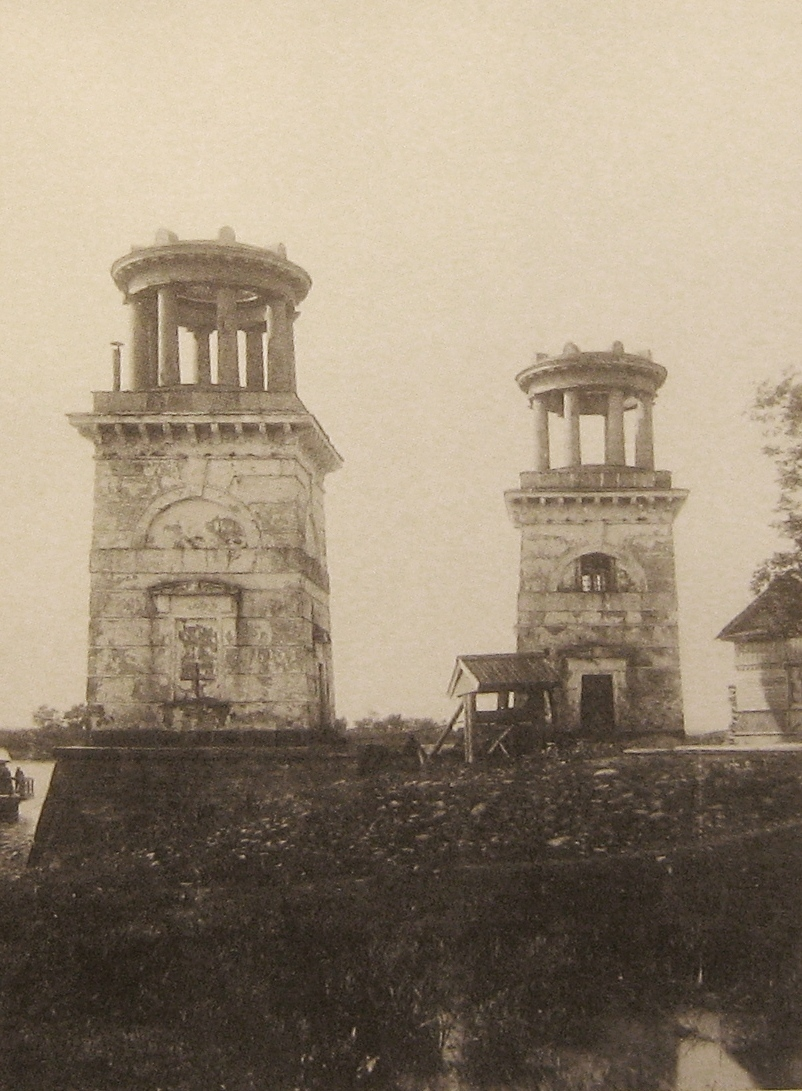

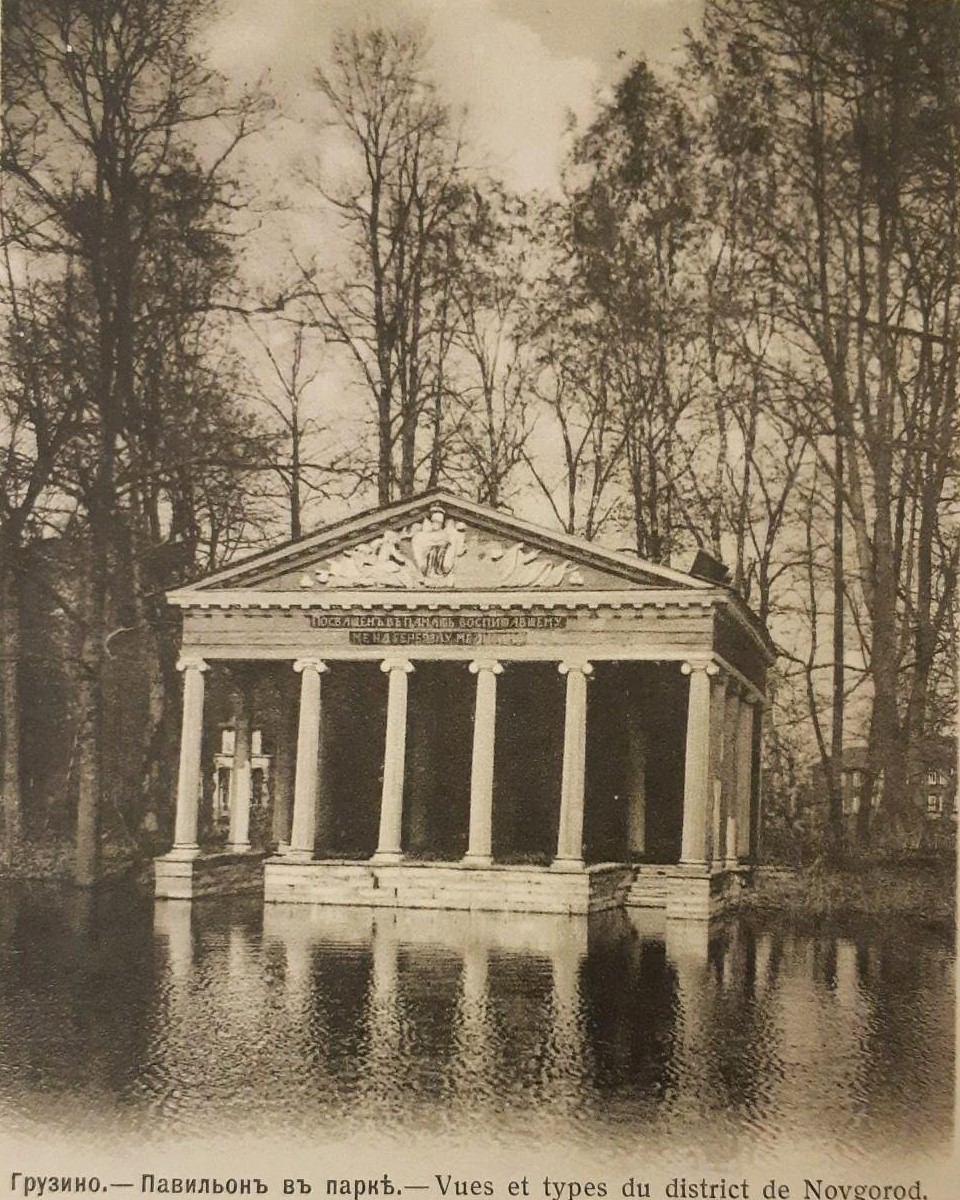

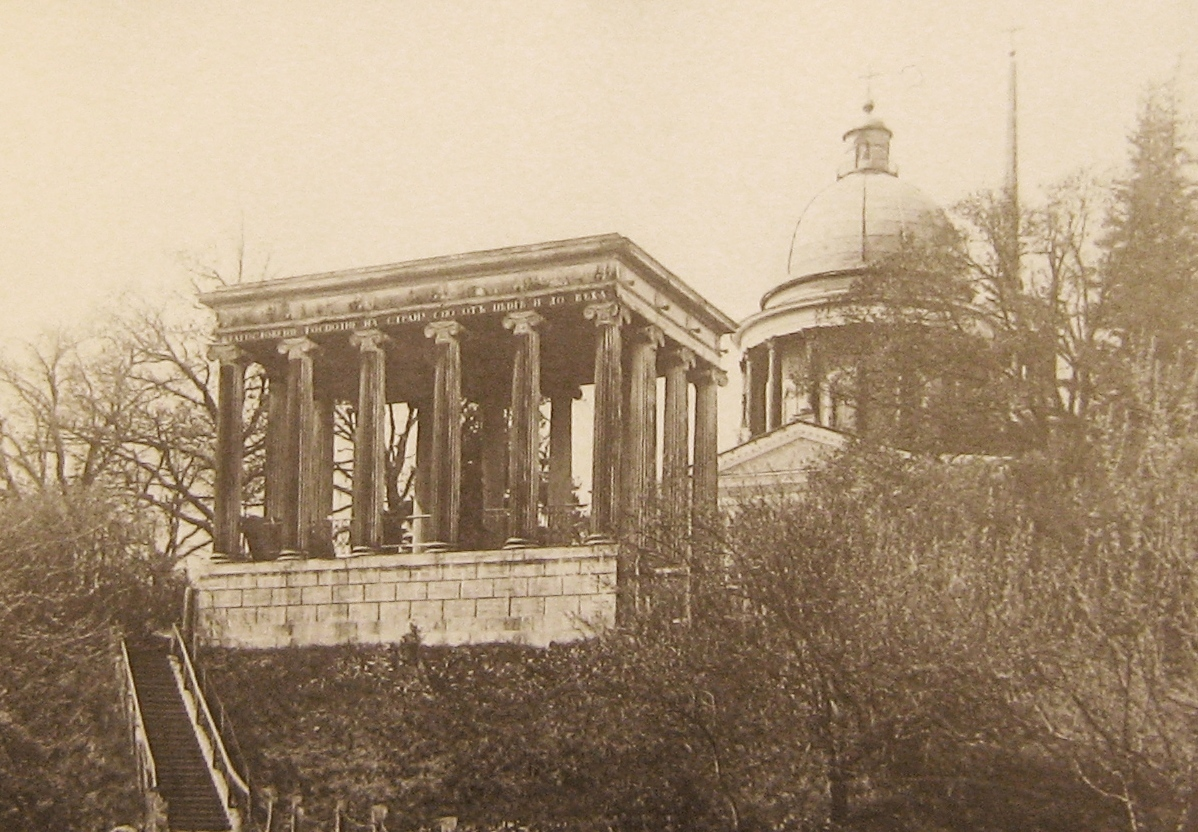

=== Lithographed views of Gruzino, 1810-1824 ===
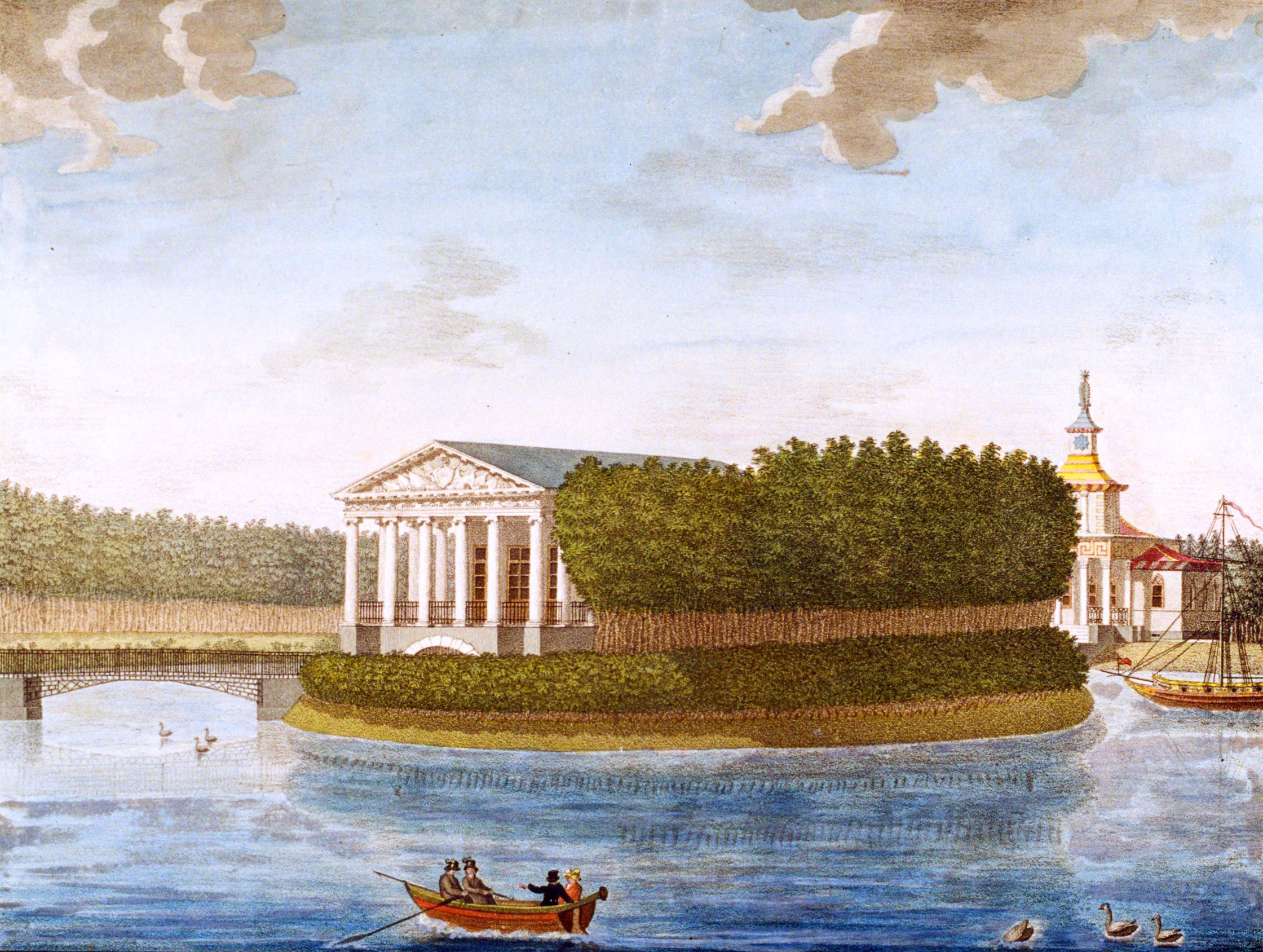

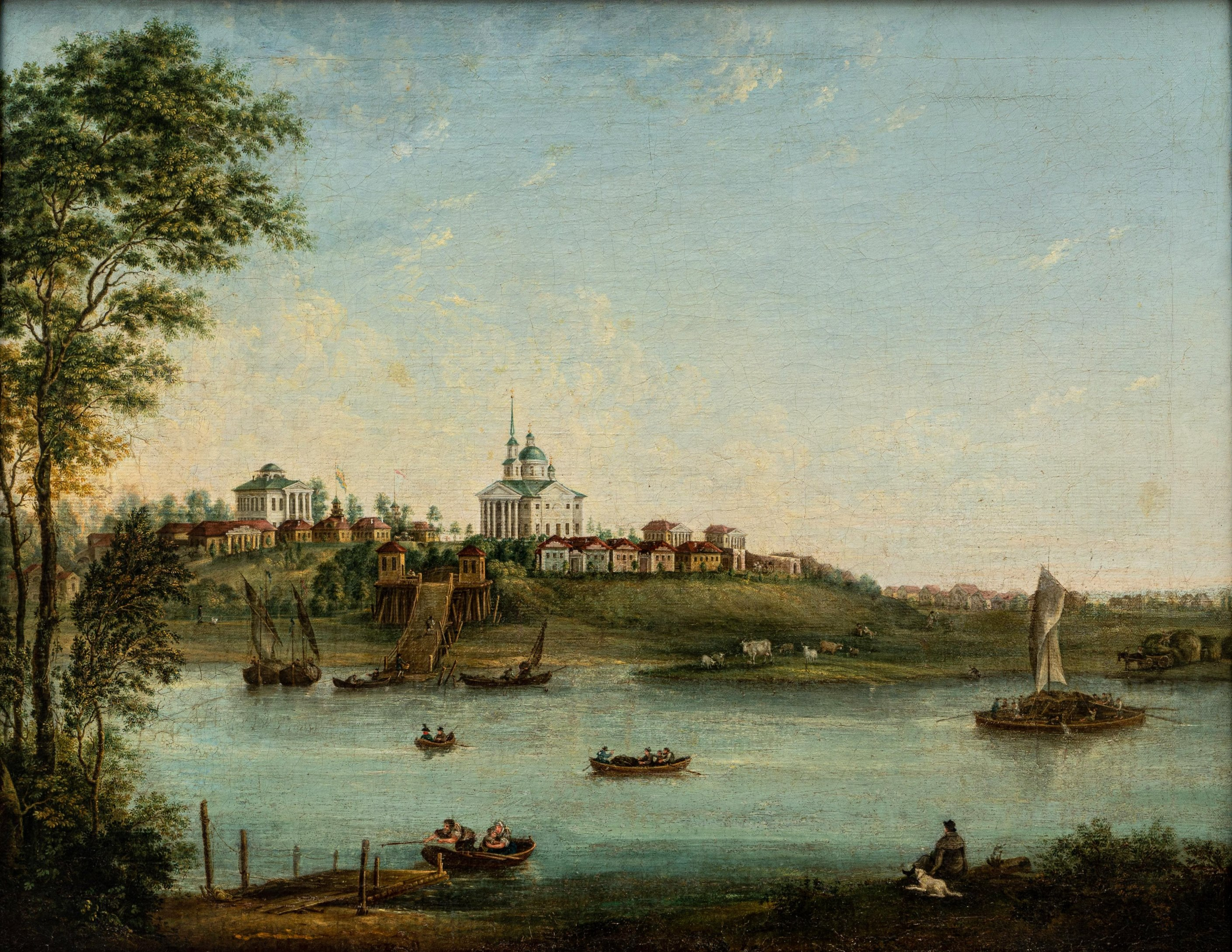

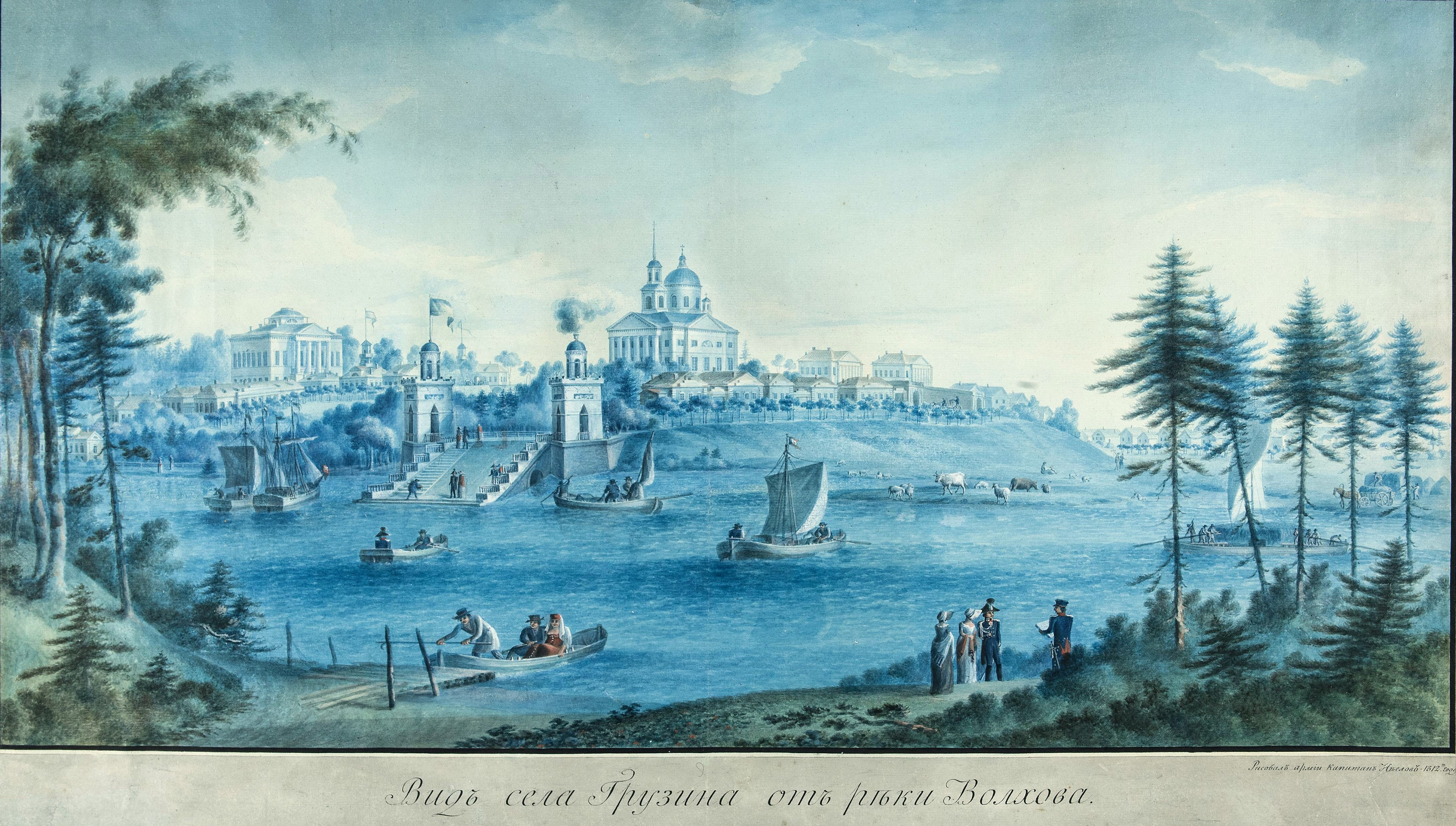
