= Safronov =

Safronov or the feminine equivalent Safronova is a surname. It may refer to:

== Places ==
- Safronov, Volgograd Oblast, Volgograd Oblast, Russia
- Safronovo, Altai Krai, Russia
- Safronovskaya, Arkhangelsk Oblast, Arkhangelsk Oblast, Russia
- Safronovskaya, Vologda Oblast, Vologda Oblast, Russia

== People with the surname ==
=== Safronov ===
- Afanasy Safronov (1903–1944), Soviet general
- Dmitriy Safronov, Russian athlete (marathon)
- Dmitrii Safronov, Russian Paralympic athlete
- Ivan Safronov (1956–2007), Russian colonel and journalist
- Ivan Safronov (1990) (born 1990), Russian journalist and son of Ivan Safronov (1956–2007)
- Kirill Safronov, Russian ice hockey player
- Oleksandr Safronov, Ukrainian football player
- Viktor Safronov (1917-1999), Soviet astronomer
- Vladimir Safronov (1934–1979), Russian boxer
- Vladimir Safronov (actor) (1940–2025), Russian actor

=== Safronova ===
- Alessya Safronova, Kazakhstani volleyball player, Liza's mother
- Liza Safronova, Turkish-Kazakhstani volleyball player, Alessya's daughter
- Maria Safronova, Russian artist
- Marianna S. Safronova, Russian/American scientist involved in theoretical atomic physics
- Milana Safronova, Kazakhstani boxer
- Natalya Safronova, Russian volleyball player
- Olga Safronova, Kazakhstani sprinter
- Valentina Safronova (1918—1943), Bryansk guerilla in World War II

=== Safranovas ===
- Vasilijus Safronovas, Lithuanian historian

=== Safronkov ===
- Vladimir Safronkov, Russian diplomat

== See also ==
- Sofronov (disambiguation)
