= Sofronov =

Sofronov may refer to:

== People ==
- Anatoly Sofronov (1911–1990), Soviet Russian writer, poet, playwright, scriptwriter, editor
- Georgy Sofronov (1893–1973), Soviet general

== Places ==
- Sofronovo, Melenkovsky District, Vladimir Oblast, Russia
- Sofronovo, Nikolsky District, Vologda Oblast, Russia
- Sofronovo, Vashkinsky District, Vologda Oblast, Russia

== See also ==
- Safronov (disambiguation)
- Sofronovo (disambiguation)
