= Safronovskaya =

Safronovskaya may refer to:

- Safronovskaya, Arkhangelsk Oblast, Russia
- Safronovskaya, Vologda Oblast, Russia
