= Sofronovo =

Sofronovo may refer to:

- Sofronovo, Melenkovsky District, Vladimir Oblast, Russia
- Sofronovo, Nikolsky District, Vologda Oblast, Russia
- Sofronovo, Vashkinsky District, Vologda Oblast, Russia
