= Vasilijus Safronovas =

Lithuanian historian (born 1984)

Vasilijus Safronovas (born 21 July 1984, in Klaipėda) is a Lithuanian historian. Throughout his writings he explores modern cultural and intellectual history of Lithuania and former region of East Prussia, with particular interest to former Territory of Memel/ Klaipėda (or Memelgebiet in German).

== Life ==
At the age 17 he published his first scientific book – a synthetic work on history of the city of Klaipėda. In 2007 Safronovas received his M.A. in history from Klaipėda University and in 2011 defended his PhD "The Competition of Identity Ideologies in a City of South-Eastern Baltic Sea Region: the Case-Study of Klaipėda in the 20th Century" at The Lithuanian Institute of History and Klaipėda University (supervisor Professor Alvydas Nikžentaitis), developing the concept of competition between different identity ideologies and cultures of remembrance in the same city.

Since 2008, he has worked as a lecturer at Department of History, Klaipėda University (giving lectures on Theory and History of Historiography; Heritage Theory and Management; History of the City and Region of Klaipėda). In 2010 to 2015 he also worked as research fellow at the Lithuanian Institute of History (Vilnius) as well as at the Institute of Baltic Region History and Archaeology (within Klaipėda University) from 2011. Safronovas participates in national and international research projects on various topics in identity and collective memory, coordinated by both of these institutes.

Among his works are several books and more than 40 scholarly articles, published in Lithuanian, German, English, Russian, French, and Polish on issues of history of the city and region of Klaipėda, nationalism, foundational myths, collective memory, identity, cultures of remembrance, and politics of history in Lithuania, former region of East Prussia, and the Baltic Sea Region in the 19th and the 20th Century. He was also an author of 545 articles on regional history prepared for the 4th Volume of "Encyclopaedia of Lithuania Minor" (2009) and co-editor of several books published in the series "Acta Historica Universitatis Klaipedensis" by Klaipėda University.

In 2012 his PhD dissertation was awarded with a prize of Lithuanian Society of Young Researchers. His works were also awarded with Immanuel Kant Scholarly Prize founded by Minister of State in the Federal Chancellery of Germany and Federal Government Commissioner for Culture and the Media.

== Selected bibliography ==
- Klaipėdos miesto istorinės raidos bruožai, Klaipėda : S. Jokužio leidykla-spaustuvė, 2002. ISBN 978-9986-31-063-1
- Praeitis kaip konflikto šaltinis: Tapatybės ideologijų konkurencija XX amžiaus Klaipėdoje, Vilnius : Lietuvos istorijos instituto leidykla, 2011. ISBN 978-9955-847-47-2
- Polish edition: Przeszlość jako źródło konfliktu. Konkurencja ideologii tożsamości w Kłajpedzie XX wieku, Olsztyn : Uniwersytet Warmińsko-Mazurski w Olsztynie, 2012. ISBN 978-83-63040-13-0
- Updated and revised German edition: Kampf um Identität. Die ideologische Auseinandersetzung in Memel/Klaipėda im 20. Jahrhundert (Veröffentlichungen des Nordost-Instituts, Bd. 20), Wiesbaden : Harrassowitz Verlag, 2015. ISBN 978-3-447-10352-7; ISSN 1862-7455
- (co-author with Tomas S. Butkus and Vaidas Petrulis) Klaipėdos urbanistika 1945–1990 m., Vilnius : Vilniaus dailės akademija, 2015. ISBN 978-609-95464-6-9
- Nacionalinių erdvių konstravimas daugiakultūriame regione: Prūsijos Lietuvos atvejis, Vilnius : Lietuvos istorijos institutas, 2015. ISBN 978-609-417-112-3
- English edition: The Creation of National Spaces in a Pluricultural Region: The Case of Prussian Lithuania, Boston : Academic Studies Press, 2016. ISBN 978-1-61811-524-9
- [As editor] Nauji požiūriai į Klaipėdos miesto ir krašto praeitį = The City and Region of Klaipėda: New Approaches to the Past (Acta Historica Universitatis Klaipedensis, Vol. 17), Klaipėda : Klaipėdos universiteto leidykla, 2008. ISSN 1392-4095
- [As editor] Daugiareikšmės tapatybės tarpuerdvėse: Rytų Prūsijos atvejis XIX–XX amžiais = Ambiguous Identities in the Interspaces: The Case of East Prussia in the 19th and 20th Centuries (Acta Historica Universitatis Klaipedensis, Vol. 23), Klaipėda : Klaipėdos universiteto leidykla, 2011. ISSN 1392-4095
- [As editor] Erdvių pasisavinimas Rytų Prūsijoje = Appropriation of Spaces in East Prussia during the 20th Century (Acta Historica Universitatis Klaipedensis, Vol. 24), Klaipėda : Klaipėdos universiteto leidykla, 2012. ISSN 1392-4095
- [As editor] Kareivinės, tapusios Klaipėdos universitetu, Klaipėda : Klaipėdos universiteto leidykla, 2012. ISBN 978-9955-18-646-5 ["The Barracks that Became Klaipėda University"]
- [As editor] Klaipėda Europos istorijos kontekstuose, Klaipėda : Klaipėdos universiteto leidykla, 2013. ISBN 978-9955-18-721-9 ["Klaipėda in the Contexts of European History"]
- [Co-editor with Vytautas Jokubauskas and Vygantas Vareikis] Paramilitarism in the Eastern Baltics, 1918–1940: Cases Studies and Comparisons = Paramilitarizmas Rytų Baltijos regione 1918–1940: atvejo studijos ir lyginimai (Acta Historica Universitatis Klaipedensis, Vol. XXVIII), Klaipėda : Klaipėda University Press, 2014. ISSN 1392-4095
- [Co-editor with Česlovas Laurinavičius] Empires and Nationalisms in the Great War: Interactions in East-Central Europe = Imperijos ir nacionalizmai Didžiajame kare: sąveikos Vidurio Rytų Europoje (Acta Historica Universitatis Klaipedensis, Vol. XXXI), Klaipėda : Klaipėda University Press, 2015. ISSN 1392-4095
- [Co-editor with Klaus Richter] Contact Zones in the Historical Area of East Prussia = Kontaktų zonos istoriniame Rytų Prūsijos regione (Acta Historica Universitatis Klaipedensis, Vol. XXX), Klaipėda : Klaipėda University Press, 2015. ISSN 1392-4095
- [Co-editor with Vytautas Jokubauskas] Transfers of Power and the Armed Forces in Poland and Lithuania, 1919–1941 = Valdžios transferai ir ginkluotosios pajėgos: Lenkija ir Lietuva 1919–1941 metais (Acta Historica Universitatis Klaipedensis, Vol. XXXII), Klaipėda : Klaipėda University Press, 2016. ISSN 1392-4095
