= Vytautas Juščius =

Vytautas Juščius (born 1952) is a Lithuanian professor and doctor of economic science. In 1980, he graduated from the Moscow State University. In 1975–1977 and 1980–1990, he taught at the Kaunas Polytechnic Institute. Since 1990, he's the head of Economics departments at the Faculty of Social Sciences at the Klaipėda University.
