= 85th Guards Rifle Division =

- Active: 1943–1946
- Country: Soviet Union
- Branch: Red Army
- Type: Division
- Role: Infantry
- Engagements: Battle of Smolensk (1943); Orsha Offensives (1943); Battle of Nevel (1943); Pskov-Ostrov Offensive; Baltic Offensive; Riga Offensive (1944); Courland Pocket
- Decorations: Order of the Red Banner
- Battle honours: Riga

Commanders
- Notable commanders: Col. Andrei Yakovlevich Vedenin; Maj. Gen. Basan Badminovich Gorodovikov; Col. Semyon Semyonovich Chernichenko

The 85th Guards Rifle Division was reformed as an elite infantry division of the Red Army in April 1943, based on the 2nd formation of the 118th Rifle Division, and served in that role until after the end of the Great Patriotic War. Late during the conflict it became known as one of the "Latvian Guards" rifle divisions due to its role in the liberation of that state.

It was redesignated after the Rzhev-Vyazma Offensive of March during which the German 9th Army finally evacuated the Rzhev salient. While it formed in 31st Army the division was soon assigned to the 15th Guards Rifle Corps of 30th Army, which itself was redesignated as 10th Guards Army in May. The division would serve under these headquarters for the duration of the war. It re-entered the fighting in August during the offensive for the liberation of Smolensk and once this was accomplished it took part in the grinding offensives toward Orsha through the autumn and into the winter. Prior to the summer offensives of 1944 the entire Army was moved northward, becoming part of the 2nd Baltic Front. After breaking through the German defenses along the Velikaya River in July the 85th Guards entered Latvia and was awarded the Order of the Red Banner for its role in the liberation of Rēzekne. As the Baltic offensive continued the division made slow progress through swampy terrain that German commanders considered impassable, gradually drawing closer to the Latvian capital, and winning its name as an honorific on October 13. During the remainder of the war it was part of the Kurland Group of Forces, containing and wearing down the former Army Group North in the Courland pocket. Despite an admirable record the 85th Guards was gradually disbanded from mid-1945 to mid-1946.

== Formation ==
The 85th Guards was redesignated on April 10, 1943 in recognition of the 118th Rifle Division's successes in the First Rzhev–Sychyovka Offensive Operation as well as its role in the liberation of Rzhev on March 2. It officially received its Guards banner on May 10. At that time its order of battle became as follows:

- 249th Guards Rifle Regiment (from 398th Rifle Regiment)
- 251st Guards Rifle Regiment (from 463rd Rifle Regiment)
- 253rd Guards Rifle Regiment (from 527th Rifle Regiment)
- 188th Guards Artillery Regiment (from 604th Artillery Regiment)
- 90th Guards Antitank Battalion
- 86th Guards Reconnaissance Company
- 95th Guards Sapper Battalion
- 113th Guards Signal Battalion
- 89th Guards Medical/Sanitation Battalion
- 84th Guards Chemical Defense (Anti-gas) Company
- 88th Guards Motor Transport Company
- 87th Guards Field Bakery
- 81st Guards Divisional Veterinary Hospital
- 134th (later 1710th) Field Postal Station
- 1049th Field Office of the State Bank

It also briefly contained the 94th Guards Antiaircraft Battery from its redesignation until April 20. The division continued under the command of Col. Andrei Yakovlevich Vedenin, who had commanded the 2nd formation of the 118th through most of its existence. When it was redesignated it was under command of the 31st Army of Western Front, as was the 30th Guards Rifle Division. By the beginning of May both divisions were moved to 30th Army, also in Western Front, where they formed the 15th Guards Rifle Corps. Later that month the 30th Army was redesignated as the 10th Guards Army. During this period of reorganization the division was located in the area of Borodino and Golochevo, just west of Moscow.

== Into Western Russia ==
On August 1 Colonel Vedenin left the 85th Guards to take command of the 71st Rifle Corps; he would be promoted to the rank of major general on September 1. He moved to command of the 3rd Mountain Rifle Corps in 1944. After several postwar assignments he was promoted to lieutenant general in July 1953 and soon was made the Commandant of the Moscow Kremlin, a post he held until July 1967. Col. Basan Badminovich Gorodovikov took over from Vedenin on August 2; he had previously commanded the 251st Rifle Division and would be promoted to major general on October 16.

The 10th Guards Army, still in Western Front, did not see much action until the start of Operation Suvorov, the summer offensive towards Smolensk. This offensive would be conducted primarily against the German 4th Army. On August 6 the 5th, 33rd and 10th Guards armies began a reconnaissance-in-force. As a first echelon division the 85th Guards committed a battalion, reinforced with a few tanks and backed by artillery, to advance into the German security zone, which was 2-3km deep and held by platoon-sized outposts. German resistance proved stiff and gave up little ground; much of the German fire plan was uncovered but at the cost of any remaining tactical surprise. The main attack began the next morning at 0440 hours with an artillery preparation lasting just under two hours. 10th Guards and 33rd armies made the main effort between Yelnya and Spas-Demensk. 10th Guards was on the right, closer to Yelnya, with the 15th and 19th Guards Rifle Corps on a 10km-wide sector between Mazovo and Sluzna. The 5th Mechanized Corps was behind the Army, ready to exploit the expected breakthrough. The German defense rested on the positions that had been built at the base of the Rzhev salient, and were occupied by the XII Army Corps.

=== Operation Suvorov ===
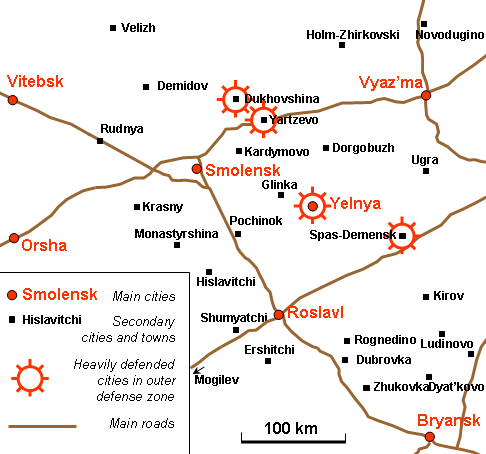
General layout of Smolensk region during the operation.

The infantry assault began at 0630 hours. The 19th Guards Corps encountered heavy resistance, particularly from German divisional artillery, and was soon stopped cold. 15th Guards Corps, on the other hand, went into the attack some time later and began slowly pushing back the 499th Regiment of the 268th Infantry Division; the 85th Guards was noted as having made progress near the village of Shemeni. By the early afternoon the Front commander, Col. Gen. V. D. Sokolovskii, was becoming concerned about the inability of most of his units to advance. He therefore committed part of his reserve 68th Army to reinforce 10th Guards Army. While this was a questionable decision on some levels, it did lead to a battalion of the 499th Regiment being overrun near Kamenka. Overall the German position on this first day remained tenable because the offensive was a series of localized attacks rather an all-out effort to overwhelm 4th Army. The operation resumed at 0730 hours on August 8 after a 30-minute artillery preparation, but 19th Guards Corps continued to be held up by what amounted to a battalion. Over the next three days the reinforced 10th Guards tried repeatedly to smash through the lines of XII Corps, particularly at Hill 233.3, as Army Group Center kept feeding in reinforcements from 9th Army to plug the weak spots. Finally, with the help of 33rd Army, the German position was overcome and their forces began towards the Yelnya - Spas-Demensk railway late on August 11. However, by now Western Front had expended almost all of its artillery ammunition.

By the end of the next day lead elements of 10th Guards Army were approaching Pavlinovo and some had already reached the rail line. XII Corps was on the verge of collapse, but the Front's mobile reserve had already been committed elsewhere. Spas-Demensk was evacuated overnight. Suvorov continued to go forward at a crawl due to deteriorating weather and supply shortages until it was suspended on August 21. In this first phase of the offensive the Army had suffered 30 percent casualties. Sokolovskii had been ordered to renew the drive by August 28 and it began at 0800 hours with a 90-minute artillery preparation across a 25km-wide front southeast of Yelnya on the sectors of 10th Guards, 33rd and 21st Armies. 10th Guards and 21st Army attacked towards Terenino station against Battle Group Vincenz which contested the advance for about eight hours before it was shattered and began falling back to the Ugra River. Overall, Western Front advanced 6-8km during the day. On the 29th the 10th Guards mopped up the German remnants that had not made it over the Ugra before boldly pushing up the rail line towards Yelnya. On August 30 the Army continued to make good progress, pushing back the 342nd Infantry Division with the 29th Guards Division and 119th Tank Regiment in the lead. By 1700 hours Soviet infantry and tanks were attacking into the town and within two hours Yelnya was liberated. From here it was only 75km to Smolensk.

However, despite the German 4th Army being in dire straits, Sokolovskii's forces were again nearly out of fuel and ammunition; in addition nine of his rifle divisions were reduced to 3,000 men or less. On September 7 the STAVKA agreed to another suspension of the offensive. It recommenced at 0545 hours on September 15 with another 90-minute artillery attack against the positions of the IX Army Corps west of Yelnya; the Corps was assigned to hold a 40km-wide front with five decimated divisions. At 1030 hours the 10th Guards Army struck the left flank of 330th Infantry Division with a mass of infantry and tanks, pushing back two battalions. Through the day several small penetrations were made but at most only 3km were gained despite the right flank of IX Corps being mauled. The assault resumed the next day at 0630 hours. 15th Guards Corps attacked the northern flank of 342nd Infantry just north of the Yelnya - Smolensk rail line but failed to make any substantive gains. Nevertheless, at 1600 hours on September 16 the 4th Army commander, Col. Gen. G. Heinrici, ordered IX Corps to withdraw to the next defensive line. After detecting the withdrawal, Sokolovskii issued orders for 10th Guards and 68th armies and most of his armor to pursue the left wing of IX Corps and approach Smolensk from the south. The next day Heinrici ordered that the city be prepared for destruction. While the Soviet troops were inspired by the prospect of a major victory at hand they were also nearing exhaustion and again low on supplies; Sokolovskii was forced to call a pause for a few days. The advance resumed on September 22 and Smolensk was liberated three days later. 10th Guards Army played no role in this, having bypassed the city to the south, but was soon pulled out of the line to regroup. 4th Army reached the Panther Line on September 29 and ended its retreat on October 2.

== Orsha Offensives ==
On the same date the lead elements of 10th Guards Army reached positions from Lyady southward along the Mereya River to the town of Baevo. In anticipation of an attack on October 3 the new Army commander, Lt. Gen. A. V. Sukhomlin, deployed his 15th Guards Corps north of 19th Guards Corps in first echelon, with 7th Guards Corps in reserve. 30th Guards Division was to assault the German positions at Lyady, backed by 85th Guards and the 153rd Tank Brigade. The Army's main attack sector was at the boundary between XXVII Army Corps' 18th Panzergrenadier Division and XXXIX Panzer Corps' 25th Panzergrenadier Division. The latter unit would soon be reinforced by infantry of the 1st SS Infantry Brigade. When the attack began as scheduled the 30th Guards was heavily reinforced by artillery and spent four days assaulting the strong German defenses at Lyady before overcoming them on the night of October 8. 15th Guards Corps then committed the 85th Guards from reserve which thrust across the Mereya north or the town. This maneuver, along with the advances of 31st and 68th Armies to the north, forced the two panzergrenadier divisions to begin a fighting withdrawal to the west. 19th Guards Corps soon joined the pursuit. The advance detachments of the Army reached the eastern approaches to Dubrovno, 15km east of Orsha, by the end of October 11. At this time the 85th and 30th Guards reached the Rossasenka River between the villages of Rusany and Kazarinovo.

Meanwhile the 29th Guards Division had failed to dislodge the 25th Panzergrenadiers near Baevo. As a result the German 4th Army's main defense line along the Pronya River remained intact. The defenses west and northwest of Baevo became Sokolovskii's next logical target. A new offensive was to begin on October 12 led by assault groups formed by five of his armies, including 10th Guards. These were to advance to the west from the region north and south of Baevo toward Orsha on a 15km-wide penetration sector. General Sukhomlin deployed his Army with the 15th and 19th Guards Corps abreast; 15th Guards Corps was on the right wing with 85th Guards in first echelon and 30th Guards in second. The attack began with an artillery preparation that lasted 85 minutes, but 10th Guards stalled almost immediately with severe losses and no appreciable gains. The assault was renewed the next day after a short artillery fire raid, with the 30th Guards being committed from second echelon, but with no better results against the German forces defending the villages of Lapyrevshchina and Arvianitsa, several kilometres northwest of Baevo. The fighting continued until October 18 with little to show but heavy Soviet casualties.

Prior to the next offensive the 10th Guards Army was redeployed to just south of the Smolensk - Minsk highway. While this sector was more heavily defended, General Sokolovskii calculated that the presence of the highway and the railway would ease resupply. The Army was reinforced from 5th Army; 15th Guards Corps received a third division, and all the Front's divisions received personnel mobilized from the liberated territories which increased their strength to 4,000-4,500 men each. The 15th and 19th Guards Corps both were deployed with one division in first echelon and the other two in second. While this extensive regrouping produced a powerful shock group astride the highway and to its north and south, it also committed many units to attack on unfamiliar sectors which increased confusion in Soviet ranks. The shock group was backed by 172 tanks and self-propelled guns and substantial artillery. The assault commenced early on October 21 after a two-hour and ten-minute artillery preparation. 31st Army struck the advance positions of the 197th Infantry Division, punched through, and was reinforced by 19th Guards Corps the next day. Over the following days the 10th Guards Army managed to clear the German defenders from the bogs south of the Verkhita River but was finally halted at nightfall on October 26 well short of the rail station at Osintori; Sokolovskii now ordered a suspension of the offensive. 10th Guards and 31st armies had gained just 4-6km in five days of fighting at a cost of 4,787 killed and 14,315 wounded. Fighting went on well into early November in local attacks and counterattacks to improve tactical positions.

A fourth effort to open the road to Orsha began on November 14. The 85th Guards was facing the 215th Infantry Regiment of the 78th Assault Division, still south of the Smolensk - Minsk highway. The attack began on November 14, following a three-and-one-half hour preparation by artillery and air attacks. A postwar account described the 10th Guards' offensive:

The 56th, 85th, and 30th Guards Rifle Divisions attacked the enemy after an artillery and aviation preparation. They captured the first trenches by an audacious dash, but an antitank ditch up to 6 metres wide and 4 metres deep obstructed the attackers' subsequent attack route... Our units managed to overcome that obstacle and capture the second trenches only by 1500 hours... The enemy launched seven counterattacks in the 85th Guards Rifle Division's sector during the day on 15 November. During the last of these, the attack struck a battalion of 253rd Guards Rifle Regiment commanded by Captain I. N. Nosov. The battalion commander decided to let the counterattacking Germans pass into the depth of his positions and then to destroy them. He informed the regimental commander [Maj. S. A. Larets] and the commander of the neighboring battalion from 249th Guards Rifle Regiment about his decision. The plan was successfully implemented, and the encircled enemy soldiers were destroyed to the last man. Senior Lieutenant P. K. Batalin, the assistant battalion commander, displayed special bravery in the battle. Having hidden in the enemy rear, he and three other soldiers cut off [the enemy's] withdrawal route and provided the opportunity for the full destruction of the penetrating enemy. The fires of that group destroyed more than 20 Hitlerites.

The official history of the "Latvian Guards" divisions includes the following details of the division's operations at this time:

The division conducted so-called "battles of local importance" along the Orsha axis during October and November, which at times were quite severe. For example, combat raged for Novoe Selo, an enemy strongpoint on the Minsk road, from 14 through 18 November. We used the procedure of employing rolling barrage fire to accompany the infantry for the first time during that offensive. The division seized Novoe Selo, but sometimes the enemy's resistance was as stubborn as it had ever been... A battalion under the command of Major Dzhunusov, whose personnel consisted of replacement recruits from the Central Asian republics, particularly distinguished itself. After an artillery rolling barrage, Dzhunusov's battalion advanced forward rapidly at 0900 hours on 14 November. Crushing German resistance, the battalion penetrated into Novoe Selo. The enemy first withdrew in panic but then launched a counterattack. The battles lasted into the evening. The Germans conducted six counterattacks; however, all of them faltered. [The battalion] held on to Novoe Selo. All the battalion's personnel displayed high offensive spirit, persistence, and massive heroism... On 18 November the division was ordered to turn its sector over to 207th Rifle Division.

This proved to be the limit of the initial Soviet advance. The battle was prolonged into early December with no more than an additional 4km being gained. Sokolovskii ceased the offensive on December 5 and withdrew 10th Guards Army into reserve. Later that month it was transferred to 2nd Baltic Front in the Velikiye Luki region; this move began on December 8 and was completed by December 31 after covering 210km. While the 7th and 19th Guards Corps each received about 5,000 replacements the 15th Guards received none. Sukhomlin requested two to three weeks to train and incorporate these new men, but the Army was ordered to return to action by January 14, 1944.

== Baltic Offensive ==
10th Guards Army had been deployed into the salient northwest of Nevel and south of Pustoshka, between the 3rd and 4th Shock Armies, with the intention of helping to eliminate the German-held salient north of Nevel with its base at Novosokolniki. However, its deployment was delayed by the need to replenish its forces, while Army Group North surprised the Soviet command by beginning a phased withdrawal from the salient on December 29, which was completed six days later.

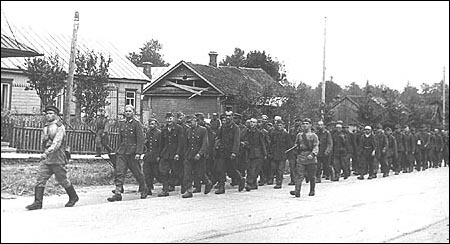
German POWs march through Rezekne, 1944

During the late winter 10th Guards Army gradually advanced north of Pustoshka towards Novorzhev. After a pause in operations through the spring General Gorodovikov was reassigned to command of the 184th Rifle Division on June 5; he would go on to be promoted to the rank of lieutenant general in May 1959 before retiring in 1961. He was replaced by Col. Semyon Semyonovich Chernichenko who would lead the division for the duration of the war. As of July 1 the 15th Guards Corps consisted of the 29th, 30th and 85th Guards Divisions, and the 85th was facing the defenses of the Panther Line from the hills due south of Novorzhev. By several weeks later the division had advanced well west of that town and had crossed the border into Latvia in the vicinity of Kārsava. The 85th Guards played a leading role in the liberation of Rēzekne on July 27 and on August 9 was recognized with the award of the Order of the Red Banner. The pace of the advance slowed over the next six weeks, largely owing to the extreme difficulty of the terrain in the Lubāna lowlands, a completely roadless expanse of swamp that was considered impassable to large formations by the German command. After a 10-day struggle for meagre pathways and sometimes through neck-deep water the area was cleared by August 8. By mid-September the 15th Guards Corps was located near Lubāna and Gulbene. In the first days of October the division was north of the Daugava River on the approaches to Riga near Ogre. The final push for the Latvian capital began on October 10. In a display of the degree of flexibility and craftiness in Soviet tactics by this stage of the war, individual rifle companies of the division, with tank support, made a reconnaissance-in-force that breached the first German defenses an hour before the offensive artillery barrage started; the first shells were planned to land on the second line and suppress German artillery until the tank–rifle forces could reach them. For its actions in this battle the division was awarded an honorific:

"RIGA... 85th Guards Rifle Division (Colonel Chernichenko, Semyon Semyonovich)... The troops who participated in the liberation of Riga, by the order of the Supreme High Command of October 13, 1944, and a commendation in Moscow, are given a salute of 24 artillery salvoes from 324 guns."

== Postwar ==
The division ended the war just beyond Riga as part of the Kurland Group of Forces, which in March 1945 became part of Leningrad Front, containing and wearing down the forces of the former Army Group North trapped in the Courland pocket. When the fighting ended the men and women of the division shared the full title of 85th Guards Rifle, Riga, Order of the Red Banner Division. (Russian: 85-я гвардейская Рижская Краснознамённая ордена Суворова дивизия.) The division was gradually disbanded from late 1945 into 1946.
