= Alvydas Nikžentaitis =

Lithuanian historian

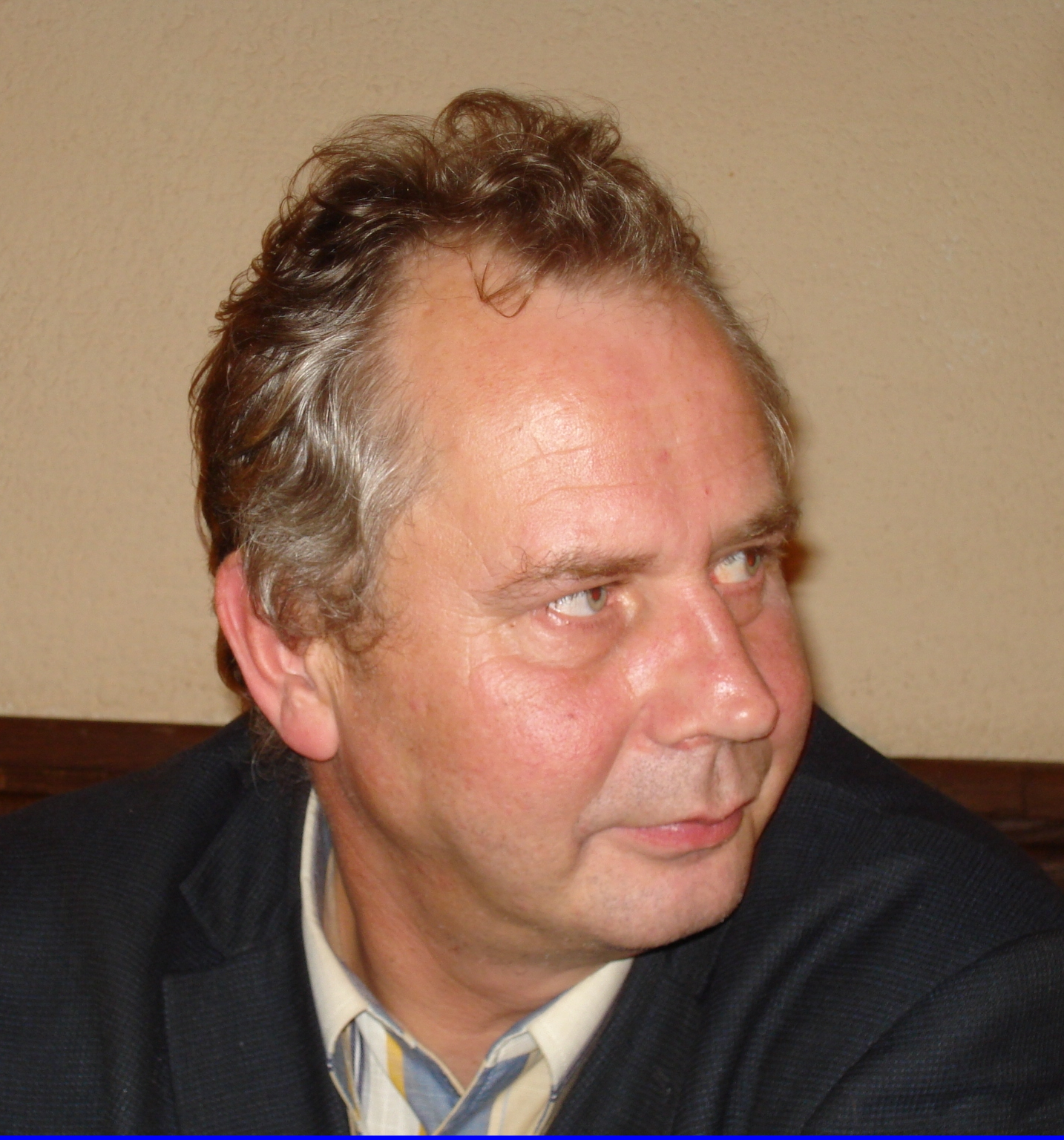
Alvydas Nikžentaitis.

Alvydas Nikžentaitis (born October 18, 1961) is a Lithuanian historian, senior research fellow of the Lithuanian Institute of History and president of Lithuanian National Historians Committee.

== Biography ==
In 1988 Alvydas Nikžentaitis defended his doctoral thesis on relations between Grand Duchy of Lithuania and Teutonic Order in the first half of the 14th century. In 1992 together with Vladas Žulkus he founded Centre of History of Western Lithuania and Prussia (from 2003 - Institute of Baltic Sea Region History and Archaeology) in Klaipėda. Nikžentaitis was also the first director of aforesaid centre and from 1993 he was a head of Historical Department at Klaipėda University. In 1999 Nikžentaitis defended his habilitated doctoral thesis on Lithuanian Pre-Christian society in the 13th and 14th centuries. In 2000 he was named director of the Lithuanian Institute of History. He served the legal maximum of eight years in this position. Till 2004 Nikžentaitis also worked at Institute of Baltic Sea Region History and Archaeology and till 2009 he was also professor of Lithuanian History at Vilnius Pedagogical University, Faculty of History. From 2009 Nikžentaitis coordinates research projects on various topics in identity and collective memory.

Main scholarly interests:

- Relationship between Grand Duchy of Lithuania and Teutonic Order;
- Historical relationship between the Lithuanians and the Germans;
- History of national myths and stereotypes;
- Problems of national identity;
- Collective memory and cultures of remembrances.

Nikžentaitis is the author of several books and articles published in Lithuania, Germany and abroad.
