= Vladas Žulkus =

Lithuanian archeologist

Vladas Žulkus (born April 16, 1945, in Telšiai) is a Lithuanian archaeologist. In October 2002 he was elected rector of Klaipėda University.

== Biography ==
Žulkus started his career as an archaeologist in the Institute for Monument Preservation in Klaipėda. From 1969 till 1990 he was fellowship of the institute (from 1979 in position of head of archaeologists group) and investigated mainly the old town and the castle ruin in Klaipėda. In 1988, after studying in Institute of Archaeology of the USSR Academy of Sciences, he defended his doctoral thesis on Klaipėda and the region in the 11th - 17th centuries. In 1990 Žulkus became a director of the History Museum of Lithuania Minor. Two years later together with Alvydas Nikžentaitis he founded Centre of History of Western Lithuania and Prussia (from 2003 - Institute of Baltic Sea Region History and Archaeology) and Historical Department at Klaipėda University. In 1993-1997 and in 2001-2002 Žulkus was director of aforesaid Centre and worked in Klaipėda University as a lector, from 1995 - associated professor, and from 2001 - professor. He originated the underwater archaeology research in Lithuania and in 1999 defended his habilitated doctoral thesis on the role of Curonians in the culture and society of Western Balts in the Iron Age. On October 11, 2002 Žulkus became rector of Klaipėda University. In 2009 he was designated a member of the scientific and technical advisory body of the UNESCO Convention on the Protection of the Underwater Cultural Heritage.

Vladas Žulkus is the author of several articles and five books on history and archaeology of Klaipėda, Curonians, and earliest Curonian settlements in Palanga. Amongst them Palanga in the Middle Ages. Ancient Settlements (2007).
