= Ivan Kosobutsky =

Soviet Army lieutenant general

Ivan Stepanovich Kosobutsky
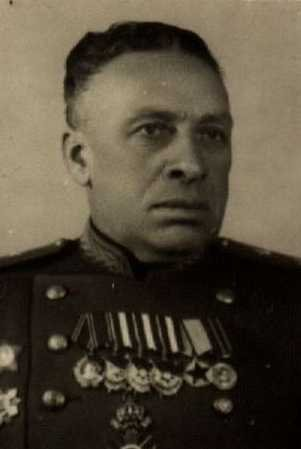
- Kosobutsky in the late 1940s
- Born: 19 March 1895; Senno, Mogilev Governorate Russian Empire
- Died: 15 November 1974 (aged 79) Moscow, Soviet Union
- Allegiance: Russian Empire; Soviet Union
- Branch: Imperial Russian Army; Red Army (Soviet Army from 1946)
- Service years: 1915–1917; 1918–1941; 1942–1953
- Rank: Lieutenant general
- Commands: 15th Rifle Corps; 41st Rifle Corps; 34th Rifle Corps
- Conflicts: World War I; Russian Civil War; Polish–Soviet War; World War II
- Awards: Order of Lenin

Ivan Stepanovich Kosobutsky (Russian: Иван Степанович Кособуцкий; 19 March 1895 – 15 November 1974) was a Soviet Army lieutenant general who held corps command during World War II.

A veteran of World War I and the Russian Civil War, Kosobutsky rose to command the 41st Rifle Corps just before Germany invaded the Soviet Union. He led the corps on the Northwestern Front in the first weeks of the war, but was blamed for the fall of Pskov in early July 1941 and imprisoned. Kosobutsky was released early in late 1942 and commanded the 34th Rifle Corps in the Soviet advance through southern Ukraine and into Romania during 1944. His corps was stationed as an occupation force in Bulgaria from late 1944 and Kosobutsky held a series of training posts before leaving service in the early 1950s.

== Early life, World War I and Russian Civil War ==
A Belorussian, Ivan Stepanovich Kosobutsky was born on 19 March 1905 in the town of Senno, Mogilev Governorate. Conscripted into the Imperial Russian Army in May 1915 during World War I, he was sent to the 7th Moscow School for Praporshchiks for junior officer training. After graduating with the rank of praporshchik, he was sent to the Western Front. Kosobutsky served as an assistant company commander and was demobilized in 1917 with the rank of staff-captain. Kosobutsky was conscripted into the Red Army in June 1918 during the Russian Civil War and appointed assistant commander of the Senno People's Infantry Regiment. He fought on the Western Front with the 17th Rifle Division of the Western Army from October 1918, commanding its 147th and 152nd Rifle Regiments. With the division, he took part in fighting against Polish troops and the Ukrainian People's Army on the Dvinsk, Pinsk, and Mozyr axis, then fought against the Ukrainian People's Army on the Korosten axis. In the summer of 1919 Kosobutsky and the division were involved in fighting in the region of Vilno, Molodechno, and the Western Dvina, and on the Zhlobin axis that fall.

In February 1920 he transferred to command the 23rd Rifle Brigade of the army's 8th Rifle Division, taking part in the Polish–Soviet War. In July Kosobutsky returned to the 17th Rifle Division, commanding its 153rd Rifle Regiment and 49th Rifle Brigade. With the division, he took part in the August offensive on the Minsk, Slonim, Volkovysk, Siedlce and Warsaw axis, and the fight against Bulak-Balakhovich's army between November 1920 and May 1921. Kosobutsky was wounded during the 1920 fighting and decorated with the Order of the Red Banner in 1922 for his performance.

== Interwar period ==
After the end of the war, from June 1922, Kosobutsky continued to serve with the 17th Rifle Division, part of the Moscow Military District's 3rd Rifle Corps at Vladimir. He commanded the 51st Rifle Regiment, served as assistant division commander, and returned to command the regiment. Kosobutsky graduated from the Higher Rifle-Tactical School for Command Personnel In April 1926 he transferred to serve as assistant chief of the 11th Nizhny Novgorod Infantry School for training and combat units, and in November became military instructor of the Nizhny Novgorod State University.

Kosobutsky entered the Frunze Military Academy for advanced training in September 1927, and on his graduation in February 1930 became assistant chief of staff of the 9th Rifle Corps in the North Caucasus Military District. He returned to the academy as a tactics instructor in February 1931, and in June 1933 became chief of staff of the 44th Rifle Division of the Ukrainian Military District's 8th Rifle Corps. Kosobutsky continued to serve in Ukraine as a chief of staff of the Novograd-Volynsky Fortified Region from January 1935. He served in the same position with the 8th Rifle Corps from May 1936, and in August 1937 took command of the 15th Rifle Corps of the Kiev Military District.

In October that year he became an army inspector for the district, and deputy district chief of staff in March 1938. Kosobutsky was transferred to chief of Construction Directorate No. 180 at Shepetovka in August of that year, and became a senior instructor of the higher formations tactics department at the Academy of the General Staff in August 1939. While at the academy, Kosobutsky was dispatched on an official trip on the orders of Deputy People's Commissar of Defense Yefim Shchadenko between January and August 1940. Having received the rank of major general when the Red Army introduced general officer ranks on 4 June 1940, he was appointed commander of the Moscow Military District's 41st Rifle Corps in March 1941.

== World War II ==
After Germany invaded the Soviet Union, Kosobutsky's corps was assigned to the Northwestern Front on 28 June and in early July took part in intense defensive battles, securing the retreat of the front's troops from the line of the Western Dvina to the Pskov–Ostrov fortified region. As German troops approached Pskov on 8 July, they threatened the left flank of the corps' 118th Rifle Division, commanded by Major General Nikolay Glovatsky. Glovatsky reported the situation to Kosobutsky, who gave the order to retreat to the right bank of the Velikaya and abandon Pskov. However, Glovatsky was not informed that the 111th Rifle Division also had to retreat behind the 118th, and the bridge over the Velikaya was blown up prematurely before all the units of both divisions had managed to cross the river. As a result, panic arose and the crossing had to be conducted with improvised means while under German fire. The corps suffered heavy losses in equipment and personnel in the fall of Pskov. Glovatsky was arrested for unauthorized retreat on 19 July. In the court case, Kosobutsky refused to support Glovatsky's account of the situation, and denied giving the order to retreat. In his defense Glovatsky presented the written order authorizing the retreat, but was found guilty and shot. Kosobutsky himself was blamed for the fall of Pskov, and singled out by name in State Defense Committee Order No. 00381, which listed senior officers punished for the disasters of the first month of the war. Accused of tolerating mistakes in the corps headquarters and allowing the surrender of Pskov without a fight, he was deprived of his rank by the Military Collegium of the Supreme Court of the Soviet Union and sentenced to ten years in the Gulag on 26 July.

Kosobutsky was freed early by a decision of the Presidium of the Supreme Soviet on 21 October 1942 in response to a petition for pardon and sent to the front. Kosobutsky became assistant commander of the Southwestern Front for the formation of reserves in November. When the front went on the offensive in August 1943, Kosobutsky was placed in charge of the auxiliary command post on the right flank of the front. For his performance in this position, front commander Rodion Malinovsky recommended Kosobutsky for the Order of the Red Banner, awarded on 26 October 1943. The recommendation read:

Comrade Kosobutsky fulfilled an entire series of responsible assignments of the front Military Council and coped excellently with the tasks assigned to him. For the last six months Comrade Kosobutsky worked directly in armies and forward units, verifying the condition of the defense of the troops and with the transition of the troops of the front to the offensive, led the auxiliary command post of the front on the right flank, precisely implementing all decisions of the front Military Council. He was often directly present with the advancing troops, where he showed personal courage and bravery and ensured the successful offensive of the troops of the right wing in the region of Zmiyev, for which he is deserving of the award of the Order of the Red Banner.

In response to a petition from the 3rd Ukrainian Front Military Council, the Military Collegium of the Supreme Court rehabilitated Kosobutsky on 30 October 1943, expunged his sentence, and restored him to the rank of major general. However, his party membership was not restored. In October 1943, Kosobutsky took command of the 34th Rifle Corps of the 1st Guards Army of the 3rd Ukrainian Front. He led the corps for the rest of the war, during which it was transferred to the 46th, 57th Army, and 37th Armies. During this period, the corps took part in the Battle of the Dnieper, the Nikopol–Krivoi Rog Offensive, the Bereznegovatoye–Snigirevka offensive, the Odessa Offensive, and the Second Jassy–Kishinev offensive. In these operations, Kosobutsky's corps took Dnepropetrovsk, Krivoi Rog, Shumen, and Constanța. For his performance in the Nikopol–Krivoi Rog Offensive, 46th Army commander Vasily Glagolev recommended Kosobutsky for the Order of Bogdan Khmelnitsky, 2nd class, which was upgraded to the Order of Suvorov, 2nd class and awarded on 19 March 1944. The citation read:

Major General I. S. Kosobutsky is a strong-willed, bold commander. In battle he correctly assesses the situation and makes bold decisions. During the breakthrough of the enemy defense in the region of Sofiyevka and the offensive operations of the army he skillfully organized the battle, all the time created an offensive rush, ensuring the accomplishment of the command objectives. Skillfully maneuvering units in cooperation with means of reinforcement, he inflicted heavy blows on the enemy the entire time, which inflicted significant losses in personnel and equipment. During the period of offensive battles from 27 January 1944 to 10 February 1944, the corps liberated nineteen settlements, including the major district center of Stalindorf, and inflicted a defeat on the enemy: 1,221 soldiers and officers killed, 31 taken prisoner. In this same period the corps captured significant trophies in weapons, ammunition and provisions.

With fine maneuver, tirelessly pressing and pursuing the enemy, the corps approached the outskirts of the large industrial center of Ukraine - the city of Krivoi Rog and in cooperation with other units of the 46th Army on 22 February 1944 took the city by storm, inflicting great damage on the enemy.

For skillful conduct of the breakthrough of the enemy fortified zone, organization of the corps' offensive operations that gave the opportunity to inflict great losses on the enemy in personnel and equipment and to take the major industrial center of Ukraine - the city of Krivoi Rog, Major General Kosobutsky is deserving of the award of the Order of Bogdan Khmelnitsky, 2nd class.

For his performance in the Second Jassy–Kishinev offensive, 46th Army commander Ivan Shlyomin recommended Kosobutsky for the Order of Kutuzov, 2nd class, awarded on 13 September. The recommendation read:

Major General Kosobutsky, with his corps, from April 1944, held a bridgehead on the right bank of the Dniester in the region of Raskaets-Purkar.

Repeated attempts of the enemy to eliminate the bridgehead suffered defeats, in the battle on 23 July 1944 alone, when the enemy with the forces of up to four regiments and 34 armored vehicles tried to force the unit over the Dniester, but all attacks of the enemy were repulsed and great losses inflicted on him, up to 1,200 soldiers and officers were wiped out and eighteen armored vehicles destroyed.

On 20 August 1944, units of the corps went over to the offensive, broke through the strongly fortified and deeply echeloned defense of the enemy, and, developing the offensive further, reached the station of Sarata by a flanking maneuver, cut off the path of retreat of the enemy Lower Dniester group and joined battle to wipe them out.

During the period of battles from 20 to 28 August 1944, the corps destroyed the 10th, 15th, and 2nd Infantry Divisions and part of the 21st Romanian Infantry Divisions, the enemy left on the battlefield 10,000 German and Romanian soldiers and officers, 5,100 men were taken prisoner...On 28 August units of the corps fought their way to the bank of the Danube.

For skillful leadership of the corps, successful accomplishment of combat objectives, as a result of which a number of settlements of Soviet Moldavia were liberated, and inflicting a significant defeat on the enemy in personnel and equipment, Major General Kosobutsky is deserving of the award of the Order of Kutuzov, 2nd class.

Kosobutsky, promoted to lieutenant general on 13 September, was evaluated by superiors as follows:

During the battles on the territory of Ukraine he showed...ability to accomplish difficult objectives of offensive battle in combination with skillful organization of combined arms cooperation. Thanks to his skillful and correct decisions the corps accomplished the assigned objectives...In difficult situations he conducted himself boldly and calmly.

After the Soviet occupation of Bulgaria, the corps was stationed in Sofia from October 1944, remaining there for the rest of the war.

== Postwar ==
After the end of the war, Kosobutsky served as chief of staff of the Combat and Physical Training Directorate of the Southern Group of Forces from August 1945. In January 1946 he became a senior instructor in the higher formations tactics department of the Voroshilov Higher Military Academy. Kosobutsky rose to chief of the department in April 1949, and was transferred to the reserve in June 1953. He died in Moscow on 15 November 1974, and the urn with his ashes was placed in the old crematorium of the Donskoye Cemetery.

== Awards ==
Kosobutsky was a recipient of the following decorations:

- Order of Lenin
- Order of the Red Banner (4)
- Order of Suvorov, 2nd class
- Order of Kutuzov, 2nd class
- Order of Saint Alexander, 3rd class (Bulgaria)
