= 118th Rifle Division =

118th Rifle Division (July 6, 1940 – September 27, 1941) 118th Rifle Division (January 18, 1942 – April 10, 1943) 118th Rifle Division (May 19, 1943 – 1946)
- Active: 1940–1946
- Country: Soviet Union
- Branch: Red Army
- Type: Infantry
- Size: Division
- Engagements: World War II; Operation Barbarossa; Defense of Pskov; Siege of Leningrad; First Rzhev–Sychyovka Offensive Operation; Operation Mars; Rzhev-Vyazma Offensive; Mius Offensive; Donbas Strategic Offensive; Lower Dnieper Offensive; Melitopol Offensive; Nikopol–Krivoi Rog Offensive; First Jassy-Kishinev Offensive; Lvov–Sandomierz Offensive; Vistula-Oder Offensive; Lower Silesian Offensive; Berlin Offensive; Battle of the Oder–Neisse; Spremberg–Torgau Offensive Operation; Battle of Bautzen; Prague Offensive
- Decorations: Order of the Red Banner (3rd Formation)
- Battle honours: Melitopol (3rd Formation)

Commanders
- Notable commanders: Maj. Gen. Nikolai Mikhailovich Glovatskii; Col. Afanasy Safronov; Col. Andrei Yakovlevich Vedenin; Col. Fyodor Grigorevich Dobrovolskii; Maj. Gen. Mikhail Afanasevich Sukhanov

The 118th Rifle Division was thrice formed as an infantry division of the Red Army, first as part of the prewar buildup of forces. The first formation was based on the shtat (table of organization and equipment) of September 13, 1939. It was based at Kostroma through its early existence. After the German invasion in June 1941 it was rushed to the front as part of the 41st Rifle Corps and arrived at the Pskov Fortified Area between July 2–4. Under pressure from the 4th Panzer Group the division commander, Maj. Gen. Nikolai Mikhailovich Glovatsky, requested permission on July 8 to retreat east across the Velikaya River. There is some question if he received written orders and in any case the retreat fell into chaos due to a prematurely-blown bridge. Glovatskii was arrested on July 19, sentenced to death a week later and shot on August 3. The battered division had by then moved north to Gdov and came under command of 8th Army but could not be rebuilt due to a lack of replacements and on September 27 it was disbanded.

A new division began forming in the Gorki Oblast of Moscow Military District in January 1942 based on the shtat of December 6, 1941 and was soon numbered as the second formation of the 118th. It spent a full six months in formation and training before it was assigned to the 31st Army in Western Front. It was soon committed to action in the summer offensive to eliminate the German forces in the Rzhev–Sychyovka area and contributed to the liberation of Zubtsov in late August. The division saw limited action in Operation Mars in November–December and in March 1943 was one of the first units to enter Rzhev as it was evacuated by German 9th Army. The division had performed well enough that it was redesignated as the 85th Guards Rifle Division in April, serving under the 10th Guards Army.

The third 118th Rifle Division was raised in mid-May 1943 in Southern Front under the shtat of December 10, 1942, based on a rifle brigade. It was immediately assigned to 28th Army and remained under that headquarters until November, fighting through the Donbas and towards the lower Dniepr and winning a battle honor following the protracted battle for Melitopol in late October. After an abortive attempt to force its way into the Crimea it was transferred to the 9th Rifle Corps of 5th Shock Army and then moved to 57th Army with that Corps in the spring of 1944. After the Soviet offensive stalled along the Dniestr River the division was moved to the Reserve of the Supreme High Command in June before being reassigned to the 5th Guards Army where it mostly served in the 34th Guards Rifle Corps for the duration of the war. In early August it entered the Sandomierz bridgehead across the Vistula and remained there until the start of the Vistula-Oder Offensive in January 1945 when it broke out and advanced through Poland and into Germany with the rest of 1st Ukrainian Front. During the Berlin operation the 5th Guards advanced toward Dresden and following the German surrender the 118th was awarded the Order of the Red Banner for its part in the late April battles southeast of that city. The division was disbanded in 1946.

== 1st Formation ==
The division began forming at Kostroma in the Moscow Military District according to a decree of the Council of People's Commissars of the Soviet Union dated July 6, 1940. It was a successor to an earlier unit of the same number that began forming in September 1939 at Novocherkassk but was never completed and was disbanded in December. As of June 1941 it had the following order of battle:

- 398th Rifle Regiment
- 463rd Rifle Regiment
- 527th Rifle Regiment
- 604th Light Artillery Regiment
- 621st Howitzer Artillery Regiment
- 191st Antitank Battalion
- 472nd Antiaircraft Battalion
- 132nd Reconnaissance Battalion
- 282nd Sapper Battalion
- 283rd Signal Battalion
- 259th Medical/Sanitation Battalion
- 260th Chemical Defense (Anti-gas) Company
- 663rd Motor Transport Battalion
- 422nd Field Bakery
- 521st Field Postal Station
- 439th Field Office of the State Bank

Major General Nikolai Glovatsky was appointed to command on July 16. He had been in command of the 26th Rifle Division until March 1938 when he was arrested during the latter stage of the Great Purge and imprisoned until October 1939. He then served as deputy commander of the 43rd Rifle Corps until his appointment to the 118th. When the German invasion began the division was assigned to the 41st Rifle Corps and within days was aboard trains moving toward Leningrad. After delays owing to German air attacks and the general chaos of the time the Corps (which also included the 111th and 235th Rifle Divisions) detrained north and west of Pskov during the first days of July where it was assigned to 11th Army in Northwestern Front.

=== Defense of Pskov ===
After falling back from the frontier with its surviving forces on June 25 Northwestern Front began attempting to establish a defense along the Western Dvina River but this was preempted the next morning when the 8th Panzer and 3rd Motorized Divisions arrived along its banks and by nightfall seized a significant bridgehead. Heavy fighting raged in the Daugavpils region until June 30 but the bridgehead was held. With no major defensive barrier remaining to protect the axis towards Leningrad the Front commander had ordered his 8th Army to withdraw northward into Estonia and the 11th and 27th Armies to fall back eastward to Opochka. These moves left the Pskov and Ostrov axis virtually unprotected.

On June 29 the STAVKA ordered the new commander of Northwestern Front, Maj. Gen. P. P. Sobennikov, to organize new defenses along the Velikaya River near Ostrov (the former Stalin Line) anchored to the Pskov and Ostrov Fortified Areas and to reinforce these defenses with the 41st Rifle Corps, commanded by Maj. Gen. Ivan Kosobutsky. On July 2 the OKH ordered Army Group North to advance with its main force through Pskov to Leningrad with 4th Panzer Group leading. The 1st Panzer Division captured Ostrov on July 4, piercing the former Stalin Line defenses. At the same time the 6th Panzer Division crushed the Soviet defenses along the Velikaya south of Pskov, largely due to the delayed arrival of the divisions of 41st Corps; as of that morning although 20 of the trains carrying the 118th had unloaded, two were still en route.

While senior German officers argued over future strategy and their forces struggled to overcome the swampy terrain on both sides of the Velikaya the XXXXI Motorized Corps fended off heavy Soviet counterattacks at Ostrov on July 6–7 and the following day captured Pskov, utterly compromising the remaining Stalin Line defenses and largely isolating the 111th and 118th Divisions on the west bank. On the night of July 8 General Glovatsky twice requested permission from Kosobutsky by phone to pull back across the river. This was granted on the second attempt, but Glovatsky did not get the order in writing and Kosobutsky failed to inform him that two regiments of the 111th were to withdraw over the same bridge. As the two divisions converged they became intermixed and command and control were lost. Further, as the retreat was underway an engineering officer of the 111th, without authorization or immediate threat, ordered the bridge destroyed. Up to two regiments of each rifle division were forced to cross the Velikaya using improvised means under German fire, at considerable cost. On July 16 Kosobutsky was arrested for unauthorized withdrawal from positions and sentenced to 10 years imprisonment although in the event he would be released in October 1942 and return to corps command.

Glovatsky was in turn arrested on July 19 and faced a tribunal in Leningrad on the 26th. Because he had no written order to justify his withdrawal and Kosobutskii denied having given him the order verbally he was condemned to death and executed by firing squad on August 3. He was one of two general officers in command of rifle divisions to suffer this fate during the war (the other being Maj. Gen. S. G. Galaktionov of the 30th Mountain Rifle Division). Glovatsky remained on the books as commander of the 118th until Col. Afanasy Safronov took over on August 20. Glovatskii would be officially rehabilitated in 1958.

=== Approaches to Leningrad ===
On July 4 the Red Army's chief of staff, Army Gen. G. K. Zhukov, had ordered the Northern and Northwestern Fronts to begin construction of a new defense line along the Luga River, roughly 100 km south of Leningrad. By July 14 the 118th had been assigned to the Luga Operational Group along with the rest of 41st Corps and assorted other units. However, in the confusion following the fall of Pskov the division had moved almost due north along the eastern shore of Lake Peipus, eventually taking up positions near Gdov. In fighting with the 58th Infantry Division from July 16–20 the 118th was surrounded and forced to break out, in part with the assistance of the Peipus Flotilla, and reached Narva but lost 1,200 men taken prisoner in the process. As of August 1 it had been detached from 41st Corps and reassigned to the 8th Army in Northern Front.

German infantry forces occupied Kingisepp on August 16 and forced the five rifle divisions of 8th Army defending the Kingisepp axis from the Narva region to the west bank of the Luga on August 21. The 18th Army's XXVI and XXVIII Army Corps attacked north toward the Gulf of Finland from August 22–25. By September 1 the 8th Army had been forced to withdraw to new defenses forming a tight bridgehead south of Oranienbaum, a bridgehead that Soviet forces would retain until 1944. The vigorous assault left 8th Army in a shambles. By September 9 the 118th had been reduced to a strength of only 3,025 personnel, 14 76mm regimental and divisional guns, three 152mm howitzers, seven heavy and 47 light machine guns; in addition almost all of its regimental and battalion commanders had been lost. On September 27 the division was disbanded. Most of its remaining forces were transferred to the 48th Rifle Division when Colonel Safronov took command of that unit and would continue holding the Oranienbaum pocket into early 1944. Safronov was promoted to the rank of major general in September 1943 and would be mortally wounded in fighting along the Narva River on August 17, 1944, dying the following day.

From 1957-64 the successor unit to the 48th Rifle Division was designated as the 118th Motor Rifle Division.

== 2nd Formation ==
A new division began forming on January 18, 1942 in the Gorki Oblast of the Moscow Military District, formed from recruits from the Kirov, Kostroma and Yaroslavl Oblasts east of Moscow. Its order of battle remained similar to that of the 1st formation with several exceptions:

- 398th Rifle Regiment
- 463rd Rifle Regiment
- 527th Rifle Regiment
- 604th Artillery Regiment
- 191st Antitank Battalion
- 94th Antiaircraft Battery
- 132nd Reconnaissance Company
- 282nd Sapper Battalion
- 728th Signal Company (later 283rd Signal Battalion)
- 259th Medical/Sanitation Battalion
- 488th Chemical Defense (Anti-gas) Company
- 191st Motor Transport Company
- 403rd Field Bakery
- 866th Divisional Veterinary Hospital
- 1710th Field Postal Station
- 1049th Field Office of the State Bank

Lt. Col. Andrei Yakovlevich Vedenin was appointed to command the day the division began forming; he would be promoted to full colonel's rank on February 4. The 118th remained under the Moscow Military District, the Moscow Defense Zone, and eventually the 4th Reserve Army of the Reserve of the Supreme High Command for a full six months for forming up and training until it was assigned to the 31st Army of Western Front on July 18.

=== First Rzhev–Sychyovka Offensive ===
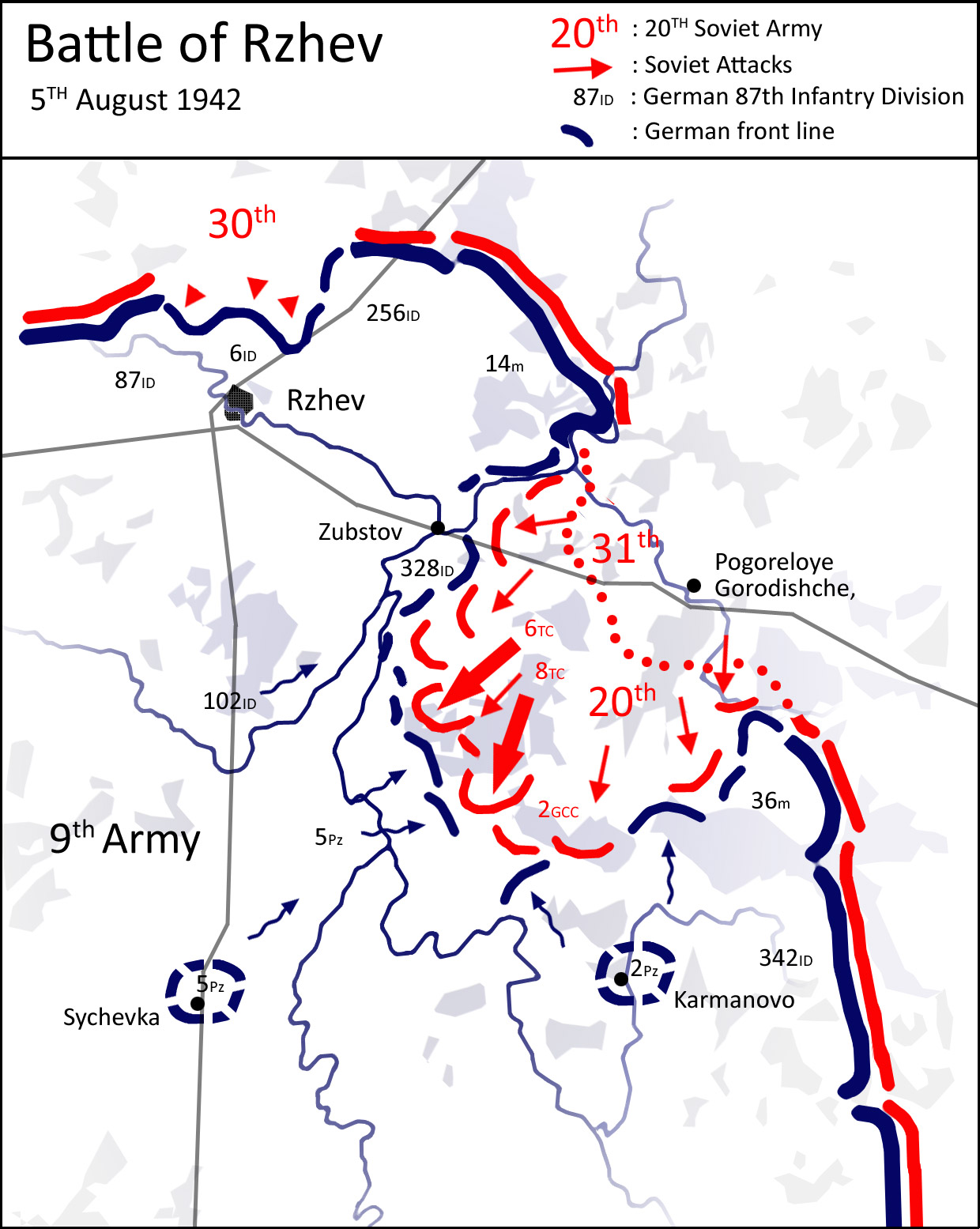
First Rzhev-Sychyovka Offensive. Western Front attacks on August 5.

In the planning for the summer offensive west of Moscow the 31st Army was one of four Soviet armies allocated from Western Front and Kalinin Front to strike the main blows to liberate Rzhev and Sychyovka and in the process encircle and destroy the main forces of German 9th Army. The intention was that Kalinin Front would attack on July 28, followed by Western Front on July 31, but in the even the latter was delayed until August 4. As of August 1 the 31st Army had seven rifle divisions under command plus four tank brigades and a substantial amount of artillery.

The offensive opened with a powerful artillery preparation which reportedly knocked out 80 percent of German weapons, after which the German defenses were penetrated on both sides of Pogoreloe Gorodishche and the 31st Army's mobile group rushed through the breaches towards Zubtsov. By the evening of August 6 the breach in the 9th Army's front had expanded up to 30 km wide and up to 25 km deep. The following day the STAVKA appointed General Zhukov to coordinate the offensives of Western and Kalinin Fronts; Zhukov proposed to liberate Rzhev with 31st and 30th Armies as soon as August 9. However, heavy German counterattacks, complicated by adverse weather, soon slowed the advance drastically. On August 23 the 31st Army, in concert with elements of the 29th Army, finally liberated Zubtsov. While this date is officially considered the end of the offensive in Soviet sources, in fact bitter fighting continued west of Zubtsov into mid-September. As of September 1 the 118th was under command of 29th Army. At dawn on September 8, the 29th and 31st Armies went on a determined offensive to seize the southern part of Rzhev. Despite resolute attacks through the following day against the German 161st Infantry Division they made little progress. After 31st Army suspended its attacks temporarily on September 16 the division returned to its command, and was one of three divisions on its right flank that resumed the assault on September 21–23 with similar lack of success. Over the course of the fighting from August 4 to September 15 the 31st Army suffered a total of 43,321 total losses in personnel.

=== Operation Mars and Rzhev-Vyazma Offensive ===
On September 13 Colonel Vedenin left command of the division, which was taken over the next day by Lt. Col. Nikolai Fyodorovich Sukharev. Vedenin returned on November 2 and led the 118th for the duration of its 2nd formation. In the planning for Operation Mars (Second Rzhev–Sychyovka Offensive), which began on November 25, the division was not given any prominent role. The three divisions of 31st Army which were allocated to attack were unable to penetrate the German defense in three days of costly fighting after which the entire Army went over to the defense. As part of a final bid to renew the offensive the 31st, 29th and 20th Armies attacked on December 11, but with no greater success before being shut down on the 18th.

In February 1943 the armies of Western and Kalinin Fronts began preparing for what would become the Rzhev-Vyasma Offensive Operation. 31st Army was to be prepared to attack by February 20–21. In the event these plans were delayed and eventually superseded when German 9th Army launched Operation Büffel on March 1 and began its phased withdrawal from the salient, pursued by 31st and other armies through the rest of the month. On March 2 the 118th was the first division of Western Front to enter Rzhev. The official history of 31st Army describes how the operation unfolded after the Rzhev region was cleared and following several sharp engagements near Sychyovka:

While developing the successes achieved, the 88th and 42nd Guards Rifle Divisions captured the regional center of Izdeshkovo on 18 March and, together with the 118th and 30th Guards Rifle Divisions, reached the eastern bank of the Dnepr River. The entire army forced the river on 20 March and advanced 20–25 kilometres toward the southwest. The roads had become completely impassible because of the spring rasputitsa, even for horse transport. The impassible mud bogged down the artillery tractors and trucks... The situation... was also complicated by the fact that, during their withdrawal, the Hitlerites blew up and burned all the towns and villages along the Vyasma River lines and turned the terrain west of the Dnepr into a "desert" zone.

On March 22 reconnaissance discovered that the German 6th and 337th Infantry Divisions had occupied defenses along previously prepared lines at the base of the former salient with full-profile trenches, extensive minefields and barbed wire obstacles. Initial attacks penetrated the first trench line but could proceed no farther and the offensive stalled. On April 10, in recognition for its part in the liberation of Rzhev, the 118th was redesignated as the 85th Guards Rifle Division.

== 3rd Formation ==
On May 19 a new 118th Rifle Division began forming in the 28th Army of Southern Front, based on the 152nd Rifle Brigade.

=== 152nd Rifle Brigade ===
The brigade was formed from December 1941 to February 1942 in the South Urals Military District and was moved by rail to the Moscow Military District in May. In July it was assigned to the Moscow Defense Zone, but in August it again boarded trains, this time to Astrakhan at the mouth of the Volga as the German summer offensive rolled across the Caucasus region. There it joined the 28th Army of Stalingrad Front in September which was defending the approaches to the lower Volga. When Operation Uranus began on November 19–20 the Army began advancing toward Elista, which was liberated on December 31 by the 152nd attacking from the north, the 248th Rifle Division from the south, plus the 34th Guards Rifle Division and the 6th Guards Tank Brigade from the east. In January 1943 it helped cover the south flank of 51st Army in a new offensive toward Rostov-na-Donu. In the late winter and early spring the brigade advanced along the north shore of the Gulf of Taganrog to the Mius River line where it was disbanded to form the new 118th Division.

Col. Fyodor Grigorevich Dobrovolskii was appointed to command on the day the division began forming. At this time its personnel were noted as being 50 percent Russian, 20 percent Ukrainian, and 30 percent of several non-Slavic nationalities. Its order of battle remained as per the 2nd formation with the following exceptions:

- The artillery regiment was designated as the 117th Guards;
- there was no antiaircraft battalion or battery;
- the 283rd Signal Battalion would later be reorganized as the 728th Signal Company;
- the Field Postal Station was numbered the 1797th and the Field Office of the State Bank was numbered the 1754th.

As of June 1 the 118th was a separate division within the small 28th Army, which also consisted of the 271st Rifle Division and the 1st Guards, 78th and 116th Fortified Regions.

== Into Ukraine ==
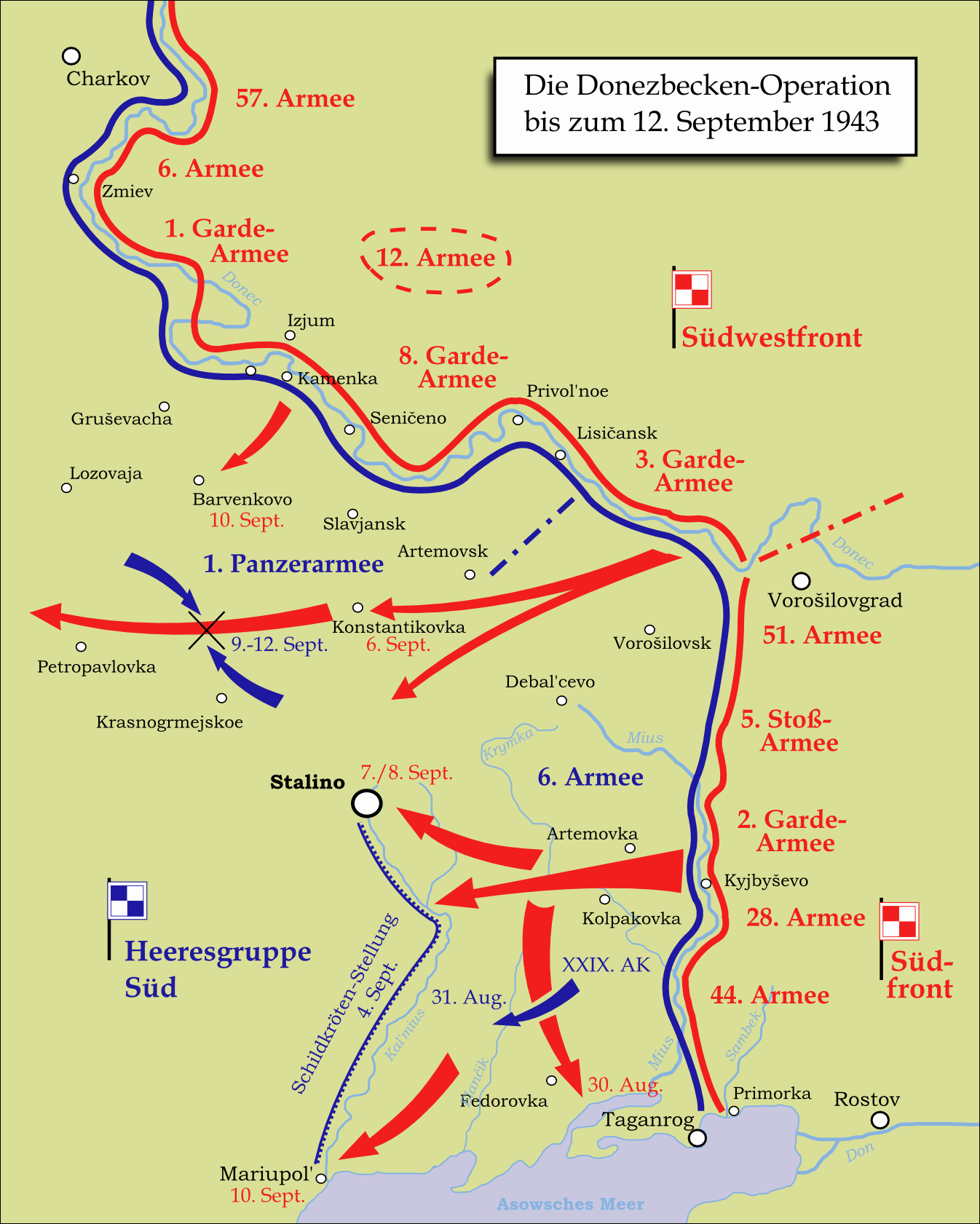
Donbas Offensive in August 1943

By the start of July the 118th and 271st Divisions had been subordinated to 55th Rifle Corps but the strength of 28th Army remained much the same as a month earlier. The new commander of Southern Front, Col. Gen. F. I. Tolbukhin, was directed to plan a new offensive to breach the German front along the Mius River which was held by the rebuilt but chronically understrength 6th Army. Tolbukhin chose to break the German defenses facing the center of his line with the 5th Shock and 28th Armies operating on a 16 km-wide sector with the 2nd Guards Army in second echelon ready to exploit any initial success. The offensive opened on July 17, within days of the suspension of the German offensive at Kursk. The 28th and 5th Shock forced the river but were soon met by German armor from the southern wing of Army Group South which first contained the bridgehead and at the end of the month launched a powerful counterblow with four panzer divisions, a panzergrenadier division and two infantry divisions. On the evening of August 1 Tolbukhin reported the situation to the STAVKA and received permission to withdraw his forces to their old positions. While he was downcast by what he considered a failure he was reassured by Marshal A. M. Vasilevskii that the offensive had successfully diverted German strength from more important axes. By this time 28th Army had five divisions under command and the 118th was no longer under corps command. Southern Front returned to the offensive on August 18, this time finally smashing the Mius-Front with the fire of over 5,000 guns and mortars on the German defenses. By the end of the month Tolbukhin's armies had taken Taganrog and Hitler finally authorized 6th Army, "if necessary", to pull back to the Kalmius River. By this time the 118th was under command of the 37th Rifle Corps, along with the 248th and 347th Rifle Divisions. Through September and well into October Southern Front (as of October 20 4th Ukrainian Front) made slow progress against 6th Army from the Dniepr to the Sea of Azov with orders to destroy the German Melitopol grouping, seize crossings over the Dniepr and then shut the German 17th Army into the Crimea. The offensive made little progress until October 9 but by October 23, led by forces of the 51st Army, the Front finally ground its way into the city, and the division was awarded an honorific:

MELITOPOL... 118th Rifle Division (Colonel Dobrovolskii, Fyodor Grigorevich)... By order of the Supreme High Command of 23 October 1943 and a commendation in Moscow, the troops who participated in the battles for the liberation of Melitopol are given a salute of 20 artillery salvoes from 224 guns.

At the start of October the division had been again a separate division in 28th Army. With Melitopol cleared the Front began a rapid advance through the Nogai Steppe to cut off the Crimea; the 51st Army was directed to seize the Perekop Isthmus while the 28th Army was to make a crossing at the Chongar Peninsula.

=== Fighting for the Chongar Peninsula ===
As the Soviet advance began on October 24 the Chongar was virtually unguarded. Lt. Gen. F. Köchling, who had recently arrived from Berlin to take over local command in Crimea, noticed the weakness and agreed to move his meagre forces to provide some defense there and at Perekop. The commander of the 336th Infantry Division, Maj. Gen. W. Kunze, established a blocking position at Salkove, at the northern entrance to the Chongar, with a battery of four 88mm flak guns and two companies of his antitank battalion, backed by just 100 infantrymen. The railway bridge was also mined for demolition. These measures were in place by October 28.

28th Army began to arrive at the eastern entrances to Crimea late in the afternoon of October 30 as Kunze continued to reinforce his position. Elements of the 347th Rifle Division brushed aside a unit of Luftwaffe field troops and began advancing down the Arabat Spit while the 118th appeared 1.5 km north of the Salkove position. Despite air and ground reconnaissance during the day and overnight the German force remained largely undetected. Around 0900 hours a column of 14-16 trucks approached Salkove, drove straight into the German fire zone, and was completely destroyed. Five hours passed before Colonel Dobrovolskii responded to this ambush by sending two rifle companies on foot, supported by mortars, against the blocking position, but the result was a desultory exchange of fire for the rest of the afternoon. The advance of the 347th Division on the Arabat was also stopped at about the same time, and this effectively ended 28th Army's attempt to force its way into Crimea from the march. During this fighting the 118th was assigned to the 67th Rifle Corps. During November it was moved again, now to the 63rd Rifle Corps of 5th Shock Army.

=== Battles in the Dniepr Bend ===
At the start of the new year 5th Shock commanded five rifle divisions and 63rd Corps consisted of the 118th and 267th Rifle Divisions. On January 12 three armies of 4th Ukrainian, the 5th Shock, 28th and 3rd Guards, began a drive to eliminate the bridgehead south of Nikopol held by the IV and XXIX Army Corps. This failed to do more than dent the German position and was stopped on the 16th. In a renewed effort on January 30 the Front pushed a deep wedge into the south end of the bridgehead toward Bolshaya Lepatikha. As of February 1 the 118th was serving as a separate division in 5th Shock Army.

German 6th Army began to retreat from the bridgehead toward the Ingulets River on February 4 with its last troops crossing the Dniepr three days later. The pursuit continued through the rest of the month largely due to deep mud conditions faced by both sides and 5th Shock reached Dudchino by March 1. The division was recorded at this time as having the same mix of nationalities among its personnel as when it was formed. During this advance the Army was transferred to the 3rd Ukrainian Front and the 118th joined the 9th Rifle Corps. Under this command the division made an assault crossing of the Southern Bug River in southern Ukraine on March 27.

=== First Jassy-Kishinev Offensive ===
As of April 1 the 9th Corps had been moved to the 57th Army, still in 3rd Ukrainian Front. The Corps also had the 230th and 301st Rifle Divisions under command. Overnight on April 10/11 the STAVKA ordered 3rd Ukrainian Front to mount a concerted offensive to reach the Soviet-Romanian state borders, forcing crossings of the Dniestr River. Early the next morning the 57th Army, on the Front's north flank, began pursuing disorganized German forces toward the river, with forward detachments from each corps in the lead, supported by small groups of tanks from the 23rd Tank Corps and the 96th Tank Brigade. Through the day these advanced up to 16 km to the west against only light resistance from 6th Army's LII and XXX Army Corps. 9th Corps was deployed on the Army's left (south) wing moving in the direction of Varnița with the support of the 595th Tank Destroyer Regiment and several construction and engineering units. The Front had assigned an 18 km long sector of the Dniestr to 57th Army from Butor to Varnița with the objective of seizing a consolidated bridgehead along its length.

Forward detachments of the Corps' forces began reaching the east bank late on April 11 between Bîcioc and Varnița. The XXX Army Corps defended this sector with remnants of its 384th and 257th Infantry Divisions. The Corps commander, Maj. Gen. Ivan Rosly, wrote in his memoirs:

We were able to compensate for the many genuine weaknesses in our preparations to force so formidable a water obstacle only by fast action. The corps reached the Dnestr without its authorized crossing equipment and could not count on reliable artillery and aviation support. The rasputitsa and the lack of roads forced serious alterations in our plans.

Roslyi's riflemen gathered up local materials, including wood, furniture and even wooden doors from nearby buildings to construct rafts and makeshift boats. The 118th captured the northern portion of Parcani and also managed to secure a small foothold on the western bank, but German resistance was stiffening. The 301st and 230th Divisions made additional gains early on April 13 at Hill 65.3 and Varnița and the 118th kept pace, but by then the nature of the battle changed as German artillery fire and airstrikes struck the Corps' forward positions continually and regrouped infantry began counterattacks to drive Roslyi's men back into the river. The objective had not been met and the Corps was left holding a set of shallow bridgeheads dominated from high ground to the west. On April 14 the Front ordered 57th Army to go over to the defense, where it remained until the offensive was renewed in August.

=== Lvov–Sandomierz Offensive ===
On May 10 Colonel Dobrovolskii handed his command to Maj. Gen. Mikhail Afanasevich Sukhanov, who would lead the division into the postwar. In June it went into the Reserve of the Supreme High Command where it was assigned to the 34th Guards Rifle Corps in the 5th Guards Army. With this Army the 118th returned to the front in the last days of July as part of 1st Ukrainian Front; it would remain under these commands for the duration of the war. The Front had launched this offensive on July 13 but the Army did not enter the operation until early August. By the end of August 3 it had concentrated in the Kolbuszowa region and was ordered to exploit the 3rd Guards Tank and 13th Armies' crossings over the Vistula in the Baranów Sandomierski area. 5th Guards Army was to develop the offensive along the Busko-Zdrój axis with the 32nd Guards Rifle Corps and toward Mielec with the 33rd Guards Rifle Corps while the Army commander, Lt. Gen. A. S. Zhadov, directed the 34th Guards Corps to remain in second echelon near Kolbuszowa. The Corps crossed in to the exiting bridgehead at Baranów throughout the day on August 6, followed by the balance of the Army during the following days. These fresh troops secured the bridgehead, led to the capture of Sandomierz on August 18 and set the stage for a protracted battle against considerable German forces well into the autumn.

== Into Poland and Germany ==
1st Ukrainian Front launched its part of the Vistula-Oder Offensive on January 12, 1945. 5th Guards Army was assigned a 6 km-wide breakthrough front, with up to 282 guns and mortars and 23 tanks and self-propelled guns per kilometre. The 4th Guards and 31st Tank Corps were to be committed on the first day to complete the breach of the German main defensive zone. The breakthrough and exploitation went largely as planned and by January 22 the Front's main group of forces, which included the 5th Guards Army, was arriving along the Oder River along a broad front in the general area of Lissa, although the Army was lagging about 20 km behind, threatening the link between the main group and the left flank armies. In response the Army was redirected towards the Oder northwest of Oppeln and reached there by day's end and captured the city the next day in cooperation with the 3rd Guards Tank and 21st Armies. The 34th Guards Corps, along with the 32nd and 33rd, were deployed in a single echelon and by January 28 had seized three substantial bridgeheads over the river.

=== Lower Silesian Offensive ===
On the night of January 30/31 the 55th Rifle Corps of 21st Army relieved 34th Guards Corps in its bridgehead between Oppeln and Brieg. Beginning on February 8 the 5th Guards Army took part in the Front's Lower Silesian Offensive with its main objective of encircling the German garrison of Breslau. On its sector the offensive was based on the bridgehead seized by 14th Guards Rifle Division in January. The German defense was based on the 269th Infantry Division with several battlegroups, independent battalions, two panzer battalions and an NCO school. The Army's attack was led by 32nd Guards Corps and developed slowly over the first three days. On February 11 the Front commander, Marshal I. S. Konev, shifted the 31st Tank Corps from 21st Army and committed it on the sector of 33rd Guards Corps the next day with the immediate objective of capturing the Bogenau area. Over the next two days the 34th Guards Corps was committed from second echelon and advanced steadily.

On February 13 German resistance did not abate and if anything increased as further forces entered the Breslau area but despite this the 4th Guards and 31st Tank Corps linked up with the 7th Guards Mechanized Corps of 6th Army to complete the encirclement. Konev chose to leave 6th Army and 34th Guards Corps to maintain the siege while the 32nd and 33rd Guards Corps were ordered to make a decisive attack from the Magnitz area toward Koberwitz and then to the southwest. The 118th was directed out of the line in the Breslau area and, together with one antitank artillery regiment, to move by dawn on February 15 to the area south of Kanth in order to prevent a German breakthrough to that town. As of the end of that day the cordon between the encircled forces and the main German forces had been widened to up to 13 km. By February 24 the remainder of 34th Guards Corps had taken out of the line in the Breslau area and the division had occupied the front from Raaben to Mettkau.

=== Berlin Operation ===
In the planning for the Upper Silesian Offensive the 34th Guards Corps was to reinforce 21st Army as part of the Oppeln group of forces, along with 4th Tank Army and 4th Guards Tank Corps. The 34th Guards and 4th Guards Tanks would attack in the direction of Priborn to support the shock group of 21st Army and reach Munsterberg by the end of the second day. Before operation began on March 15 the 118th had been replaced by the 112th Rifle Division from 6th Army, and had been reassigned to the 33rd Guards Corps, which did not take part in the offensive.

By the start of the final offensive against the German capital the 33rd Guards Corps consisted of the 78th Guards Rifle Division, the 9th Guards Airborne Division and the 118th. 5th Guards Army was deployed along the east bank of the Neisse River on a 13 km front and planned to launch its main attack with its right wing on the 8 km sector from Gross Saerchen to Muskau. The 32nd and 34th Guards Corps were deployed in the first echelon while the 33rd Guards Corps was in second echelon, along with the 4th Guards Tank Corps. At this time the division, in common with most of those in the Army, had a personnel strength of roughly 5,200 men.

When the offensive began on April 16 the Army's main forces crossed the Neisse under the cover of massed artillery fire. By the end of the day the 33rd Guards Corps had concentrated in the area from Klein Zerchen to Kwolsdorf to Toepferstedt on the river's east bank. As the offensive continued the Army's right flank reached the Spree River by the end of April 18 but the Corps remained in its second echelon, now in the area of Jamlitz. The next day the Corps was committed along the Spremberg axis in the 32nd Guards Corps' sector and by evening all three divisions were fighting along the line from Graustein to Slamen in an effort to eliminate the German bridgehead east of this important resistance center. At 1100 hours on April 20, following a pair of 5-minute artillery preparations, the 118th and its corps-mates began the storm of Spremberg which concluded with an advance of 5–6 km by the end of the day.

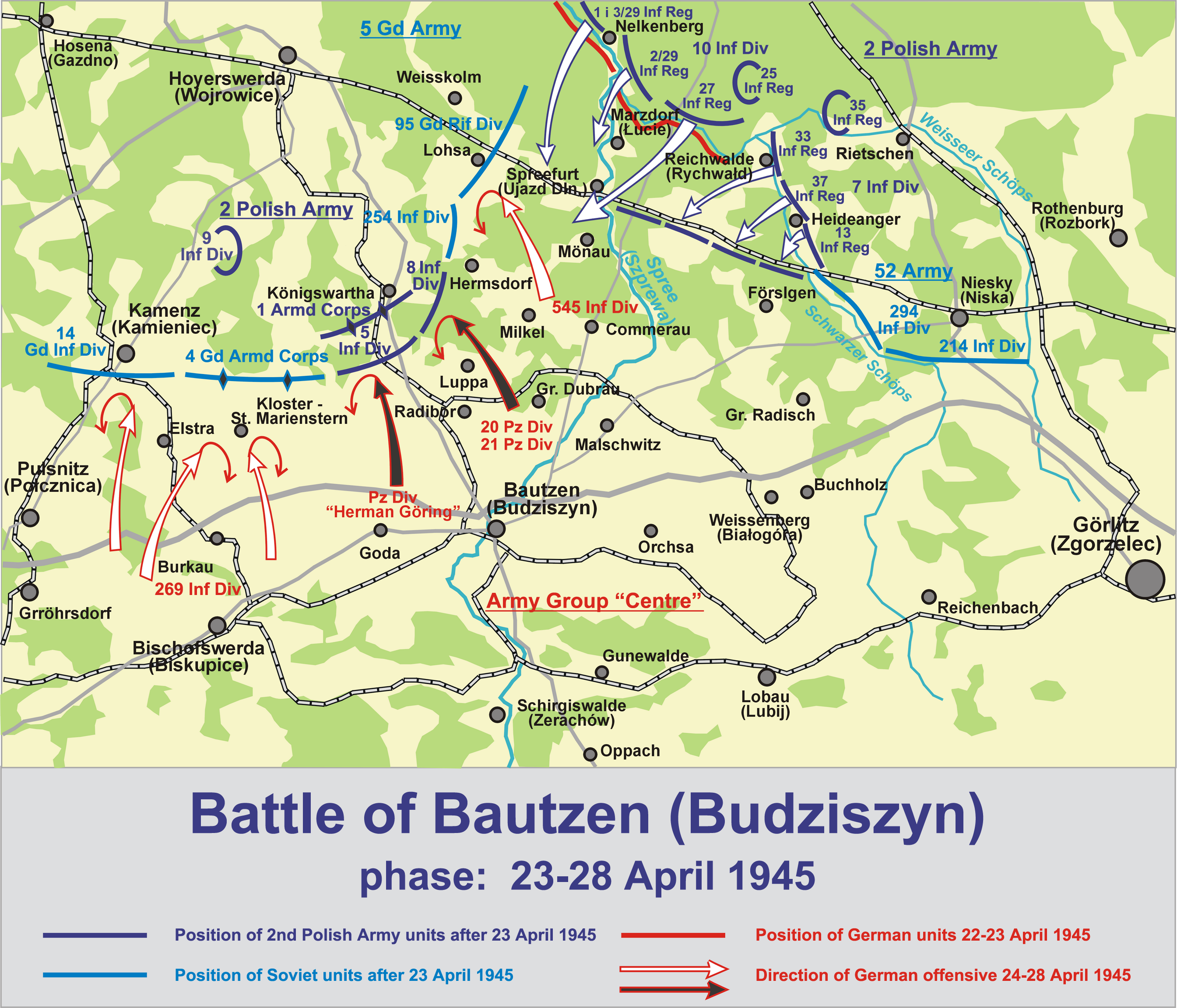
The battles near Bautzen. Note the position of the 5th Guards Army.

On April 21 the Corps linked up with the 13th Army's 24th Rifle Corps in the Neu Welzow area, completing the encirclement of the German Spremberg grouping. About 5,000 men were killed in the pocket including elements of Panzer-Führerbegleitdivision, 10th SS Panzer Division Frundsberg and 21st Panzer Division, plus 30 tanks and assault guns destroyed. Over the next two days a German force based on elements of 17th and 4th Panzer Armies launched a counteroffensive which broke through the 52nd Army's front along its boundary with the 2nd Polish Army and continued north in the general direction of Spremberg. To counter this effort, Konev ordered Zhadov to use the 33rd Guards Corps and the 14th Guards Division to attack towards Losa and Ugist (north of Bautzen) and reestablish contact with the Poles. This effort brought the German attack to a halt by the end of April 24. In the course of this complicated fighting the 118th was transferred back to the 34th Guards Corps.

During April 27–30 the German group of forces in the Görlitz area attempted to renew their counteroffensive but without success and finally went over to the defensive. From May 6–11 the 118th took part, with the rest of 1st Ukrainian Front, in the final offensive on Prague.

== Postwar ==
The division ended the war north of Prague with the title 118th Rifle, Melitopol Division. (Russian: 118-я стрелковая Мелитопольская дивизия.) On June 4 the division was awarded the Order of the Red Banner for its role in the operations near Dresden in late April. The division remained under the command of General Sukhanov until it was disbanded in September 1946.
