= Safronovo =

Safronovo Сафроново
- Selo
- Location within Altai Krai Location within Russia
- Coordinates: 53°11′N 81°06′E
- Country: Russia
- Region: Altai Krai
- District: Bayevsky District
- Time zone: UTC+7:00

Safronovo (Russian: Сафроново) is a rural locality (a selo) in Paklinsky Selsoviet, Bayevsky District, Altai Krai, Russia. The population was 246 as of 2013. There are 2 streets.

== Geography ==
Safronovo is located 45 km southeast of Bayevo (the district's administrative centre) by road. Paklino is the nearest rural locality.
