= Marianna Safronova =

American theoretical physicist

- Education: Moscow State University; University of Notre Dame
- Awards: APS Fellowship (2011); APS Woman Physicist of the Month
- Scientific career
- Fields: Theoretical Atomic Physics
- Thesis: High-precision Calculations of Atomic Properties and Parity Nonconservation in Systems with One Valence Electron (2001)
- Website: www.physics.udel.edu/~msafrono

Marianna Safronova is an American scientist working on theoretical atomic physics. Her research focuses on quantum engineering, atomic clocks and nuclear clocks, quantum sensors, dark matter, ultracold atoms, fundamental symmetries, the many-body problem, high-precision atomic codes, an online atomic data portal, and highly charged or superheavy ions.

== Career ==
Safronova received her Ph.D. in physics from the University of Notre Dame in 2001 and joined the National Institute of Standards and Technology (NIST) in 2001 as a guest researcher. In 2003, she accepted a faculty position at the University of Delaware in the department of physics and astronomy, where she is a professor. She is an adjunct fellow at the Joint Quantum Institute, NIST, and University of Maryland, College Park. Her research interests include the study of fundamental symmetries, atomic clocks, searches for the variation in fundamental constants, optical cooling and trapping of neutral atoms, and the development of high-precision methods for calculating atomic properties. She is a fellow of the American Physical Society and a member of the editorial board of the Physical Review A. In December 2011, Safronova was elected as an APS fellow for her "innovative development of high-accuracy first-principles methods of computational atomic structure and dynamics and their application to optical atomic clocks, quantum computing with neutral atoms and tests of fundamental symmetries." In 2012, Safronova received the American Physical Society's Woman Physicist of the Month award for August in recognition of her accomplishments as a researcher and mentor.

In 2011, Safronova and colleagues gained media attention when they reported on their atomic clock research at a national conference. The researchers devised a new calculation to aid ultra-precise timekeeping, findings that could potentially lead to the development of an atomic clock that loses only a second in about 32 billion years. Four years later in 2015, the latest modification achieved precision and stability levels that now meant the clock would neither gain nor lose one second in some 15 billion years.

Safronova is a fellow of the American Physical Society and the 2018–2019 chair of the American Physical Society Division of the Atomic, Molecular, and Optical Physics (DAMOP). She was a member of the Committee on a Decadal Assessment and Outlook Report on Atomic, Molecular, and Optical Science (AMO2020), National Academy of Sciences, Engineering and Medicine. She is a member of the Quantum Science and Technology journal editorial board.

In 2021, Safronova, with Rudolf Eigenmann, led a project creating an online portal that allows atomic structure calculations to be accessible to the public. The portal focuses on neutral and ionized atomic species that are of experimental interest.

Since 2004, Safronova has been invited to give over 250 talks at universities and seminars.

== Education ==
- B.Sc and M.Sc, Moscow State University, Department of Physics, Quantum statistics and Field theory group, Moscow, Russia (1988–1994). Thesis title: Renormalization of Topological Yang-Mills Theory.
- Ph.D, Department of Physics, University of Notre Dame (1994–2001). Thesis title: High-precision Calculations of Atomic Properties and Parity Nonconservation in Systems with One Valence Electron. Ph. D. Advisor: Walter R. Johnson.
