= Vladimir Safronov (actor) =

Russian actor (1940–2025)

Vladimir Alekseevich Safronov (Russian: Влади́мир Алексе́евич Сафро́нов; 1 November 1940 – 5 August 2025) was a Russian actor.

== Life and career ==
Safronov was born in Moscow on 1 November 1940. From 1972 until his death, he was an artist of the State Academic Maly Theater of Russia in Moscow, on the stage of which he portrayed more than fifty roles of different scales and genres of modern and classical repertoire.

In addition to acting, he was engaged in pedagogical activities. From 1987 to 2002, he taught acting at the Higher Theater School.

In 1982 he was awarded the Honored Artist of the RSFSR, and in 2006 was named a People's Artist of the Russian Federation.

Safronov died in Moscow on 5 August 2025, at the age of 84.
