= Maria Safronova =

Russian artist (born 1979)

- Born: May 10, 1979; Rzhev
- Education: Surikov Moscow Art Institute
- Awards: Sergey Kuryokhin Award (2015)

Maria Igorevna Safronova (Russian: Мария Игоревна Сафронова; born May 10, 1979) is a Russian artist. She is a participant of Moscow, Russian and foreign exhibitions and the member of the Moscow Union of Artists. She is included in the Top 100 recognized artists of Russia according to «InArt». In 2017, 2018, she entered the Russian Investment Art Rating 49ART, which represents outstanding contemporary artists under the age of 50. In 2015, she became the laureate of Sergey Kuryokhin Award in the nomination «The best Work of Visual Art».

== Biography ==
Maria Safronova was born on May 10, 1979 in Rzhev. She studied at the Moscow Academic Art Lyceum.

In 2003, she graduated from Surikov Moscow Art Institute (department of Monumental Painting). Maria Safronova is a scholarship Holder of the Ministry of Culture of the Russian Federation. In 2003, she participated in the painting of the Cathedral of St. Nicholas the Wonderworker in New York.

In 2011, she graduated from the Institute of Contemporary Art Problems and the School of Contemporary Art «Free Workshops» of Moscow Museum of Modern Art.

In 2016, she was a participant in Curator's Choice at the Boston Museum of Fine Arts annual summer auction in Boston, USA.

Maria Safronova's works are in the collections of the Moscow Museum of Modern Art (Moscow, Russia), the Novosibirsk State Art Museum, the Vladimir Smirnov and Konstantin Sorokin Foundation, the Erarta Museum and Gallery of Contemporary Art (St. Petersburg, Russia), the Sergey Kuryokhin Center for Contemporary Art (St. Petersburg, Russia), the Museum of Women and Children (Beijing, China), as well as in various private collections in Russia, Great Britain, USA, Switzerland, Austria, Germany, Italy, Estonia and other countries.

== Creative Work ==
Participation in personal exhibitions:

- 2011 — «Habitat» — individual exhibition, Erarta Museum, St. Petersburg.
- 2013 — «Routine» — individual exhibition, Moscow Museum of Modern Art, Moscow.
- 2015 — «Subtitles» — individual exhibition (in cooperation with Anton Kuznetsov) exhibition halls of the State Pushkin Museum, parallel program of the 6th Moscow Biennale of Contemporary Art.
- 2015 — «General game view» — individual exhibition, the gallery «Triumph».
- 2016 — «Total Private» — individual exhibition, Moscow Museum of Modern Art, Moscow.
- 2017 — «With love for the past and present», exhibition halls in Rzhev.
- 2017 — «Solar wind». The individual exhibition as part of «Artist of the Week», VLADEY, Winzavod.
- 2018 — «An experimental field», Gallery 21, «Vinzavod», Moscow.
- 2020 — «What if?», The Triumph Gallery, Moscow.

== Selected exhibitions ==
- 2010 — «From the opposite», Winzavod, Moscow.
- 2011 — «Impossible Community», Moscow Museum of Modern Art, Moscow.
- 2011 — «Cartography of the possible», Central House of Artists, Moscow.
- 2011 — «Today/Tomorrow», Moscow Museum of Modern Art, Moscow.
- 2012 — «Inconclusive Analysis», a strategic project of the 3rd Youth Biennale, Moscow Museum of Modern Art, Moscow.
- 2012 — «Rejected Reality», a parallel project of the 3rd Youth Biennale, Artplay, Moscow.
- 2012 — «Exhibition of the nominees of Kandinsky Award», «Udarnik» Cinema, Moscow.
- 2013 — «Study of research», Moscow Museum of Modern Art, Moscow.
- 2014 — «Don't you know who I am?» Museum van Hedendaagse Kunst, Antwerp, Belgium.
- 2014 — «Kandinsky Award» — «Udarnik» Cinema, Moscow.
- 2015 — «New Storytellers in Russian Art of the XX—XXI centuries», Russian Museum, Saint. Petersburg.
- 2016 — «Football – Hockey», Winzavod, Moscow.
- 2016 — «Kuryokhin Award 2015». The Kuryokhin Centre of the Contemporary Arts. Saint Petersburg.
- 2016 — «Curator’s Choice» Boston Museum of Fine Arts, USA.
- 2016 — «19/92 at first», Moscow Museum of Modern Art, Moscow.
- 2017 — «Satellite over Monchegorsk. Space in the works of artists of the XXI century», City Center of Culture, Monchegorsk.
- 2017 — «Brueghel. The Inverted World», Artplay, Moscow.
- 2018 — «R_E_volution», Motorenhalle, Dresden, Germany.
- 2018 — «Russia. Realism. XXI Century», The State Russian Museum; The State Museum of Fine Arts of the Republic of Tatarstan, Kazan.
- 2018 — The Second International Triennial of Graphics, The Novosibirsk Art Museum, Novosibirsk.
- 2018 — «The Noise of Time», Komi National Gallery, Syktyvkar.
- 2018 — «Tenderness», Ark Gallery, Moscow.
- 2018 — «18 +/- voluntary self-discipline», Moscow Museum, Moscow.
- 2018 — «On the Edges», VDNH, Optika Pavilion, Moscow.
- 2018 — «Disciplinary Spaces», The Erarta Museum, St. Petersburg.
- 2018 — «Beware, children!», The Museum of St. Petersburg Art (XX—XXI centuries), St. Petersburg.
- 2018 — «Ideal Age», Special Project «Focus» of the 6th Moscow International Biennale of Young Art, Moscow Museum of Modern Art, Moscow.
- 2019 — The 5th Ural Biennale of Contemporary Art, Urals Optical and Mechanical Plant, Yekaterinburg.
- 2019 — «There — into the universal energy flow», InArt Gallery, the Contemporary Arts Center «Vinzavod», Moscow.
- 2019 — «Art Collaboration», Biennale of Contemporary Art, Syktyvkar.
- 2019 — «ArtVilnyus», Congress Center, Vilnius.
- 2020 — «Museum of Self-isolation», Museum of Moscow.
- 2020 — «Break 15 minutes», The All-Russian Museum of Decorative and Applied Arts, Moscow.
- 2020 — Moscow Art Prize, Zaryadye Park, Moscow.
- 2020 — «Emergency», The Triumph Gallery, Moscow.
- 2021 — «The cosmos is ours!», Artstory Gallery.
- 2021 — «A new Beautiful Exhibition», Zaryadye Park, Moscow.
- 2021 — «Kandinsky Prize», Moscow Museum of Modern Art, Moscow.
- 2021 — «Innovation Award», Arsenal, Nizhny Novgorod.
- 2021 — «Nord Art», Budelsdorf, Germany.
- 2021 — «Architects of the Towers of Babel», Innovative Cultural Center, Kaluga.
- 2021 — «Social Realism. Metamorphoses», The State Tretyakov Gallery, Moscow.
- 2021 — «Emergency», Art Gallery, Tambov.
- 2021 — «Break 15 minutes», Arsenal, Nizhny Novgorod.
- 2021 — «The shadow of the soul, but a little pointed», Multimedia Art Museum, Moscow.
- 2022 — «Conduit and Schwambrania. The place where the Earth is rounded», House of Art «Peredelkino», Moscow.
- 2022 — «At your fingertips», In-Art Gallery, «Vinzavod», Moscow.
- 2022 — Apok, The Triumph Gallery, Moscow.
- 2022 — «Named Vasari. Revival», Arsenal, Nizhny Novgorod.
- 2022 — «The Great Emptiness», RuArts Foundation, Moscow.
- 2023 — «Simultaneously and nearby. Images of Conspiracy Thinking», The Triumph Gallery, Moscow.

== Reviews of art experts and art critics about the work of Maria Safronova ==
Sergey Khachaturov, an art critic, art expert, curator:

Questions at the abyss on the edge make us treat the drama of human life more wisely, its inevitable lack of freedom in the game according to the rules of society. Fortunately, Maria Safronova understands this global existential scale, alien to opportunistic socio-political ideological bias. She sees itlike a true artist. I like the quality of the workmanship, the man-made works that have nothing in common with the blurred images translated from the photos.

Alexander Borovsky, an art critic, curator. From the catalog «New Russian Storytellers in Russian Art of the XX-XXI centuries»:

Among modern young painters, Maria Safronova stands out for the concentrated seriousness of her large-scale themes. A run of works «Daily Routine» (2012-2013) documents scenes from the life of a psychiatric hospital, resembling the notes of a research scientist, which is enhanced by a layout strictly corresponding to the topology of the paintings. The fixation of the daily cycle of people subject to uniform rules and unified behavior gradually raises the most important questions of collective human behavior (the run «The Game of a general kind», 2013). Since the time of Jeremiah Bentham's «Panopticon» (an architectural project of a correctional institution with an all-seeing, all-observing prison tower), the theme of controlled space has been painfully interested in art. During the underground period, Ilya Kabakov, Leonid Lamm, Sergey Yesayan addressed her, of course, in the context of the Soviet collective experience. Maria Safronova cuts off the Soviet as an unnecessary, distracting story. In the «Daily Routine», a lack of freedom is a given without ideological connotations. People here are «just» sick, «just» committed crimes. They eat, walk, get treated, sleep — under control. The control scans the spaces, probes the bodies, and regulates the poses. There is also a model of this penitentiary institution here — a kind of greeting to the Panopticon. Everything is expected here, even an explosion of aggression — a cruel senseless fight. This is a big story about how control brings the social to a complete fusion with the anthropologicalone. Are individual narratives possible here? Can the plot, itself being an installation of control, break away from this function and let loose a couple of personal human stories? So, to break the «daily routine»?

Olga Kabanova, an art critic, journalist:

Safronova is a charmer; she knows how to pack a tough message in the gentlest way. Her painting (oil, canvas) with all the apparent artlessness — no depths andclare-obscure — it is sharp in drawing, and the colors are so radiant that even scenes in a psychiatric hospital make an exceptionally pleasant impression.

Alexandra Danilova, an art critic, curator and senior researcher at the Pushkin State Museum of Fine Arts about the project «What If?» (2017-2020):

There is something in Maria Safronova's painting that makes her related to the German «new materiality»: the same fixednessand gaze impartiality that easily turn a living person into an object. The heroes of her paintings are just objects, signs of an incomprehensible undeclared threat, which constantly hints at its presence to us. Painting breathes aggressive peace; the silence prevailing in the paintings is alarming and frightening. The ultimate objectivity of the view has now been elevated to the rank of a compositional technique. The simplicity of forms and the lack of dynamics create a special psychological effect, in which the pathos of «frozen time» triumphs. The main character of Maria Safronova's project becomes Kierkegaard's angst — metaphysical fear, a vague sense of threat. It is no longer connected with any specific events, but has turned into a «what if...» spread in the air, becoming an essential feature of the psyche of a person who is in a constant state of anxiety.

== Awards ==
- 2003 — Diploma of Patriarch Alexis II for services to the Church.
- 2004 — Diploma of Russian Academy of Arts.
- 2012 — А finalist of the Kandinsky Prize.
- 2014 — A nominee of the Kandinsky Prize.
- 2015 — The laureate of Sergey Kuryokhin Award in the nomination «The best Work of Visual Ar».
- 2017 — A nominee of the Kandinsky Prize.
- 2020 — A nominee of the Moscow Art Prize.
- 2021 — A nominee of the Kandinsky Prize.
- 2021 — A nominee of the Nord Art Prize (Germany).
- 2021 — А finalist of the «Innovation Award».

== Photo Gallery ==
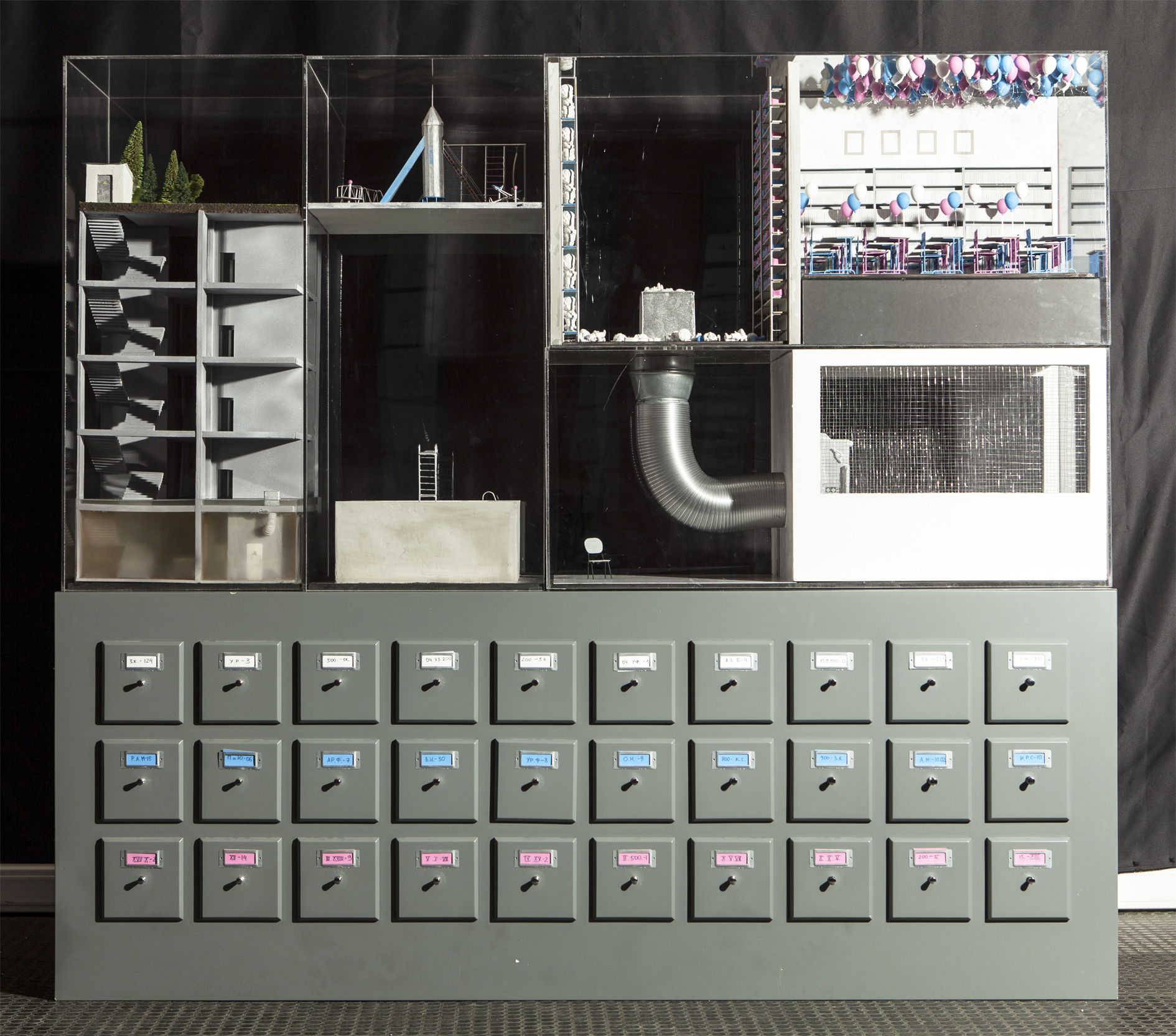
Filing cabinet (from the project «General game type»)
