= Vladimir Safronkov =

Russian diplomat

Vladimir Karpovich Safronkov (Russian: Владимир Карпович Сафронков, born 29 March 1964) is a Russian diplomat. He is the Russian deputy envoy to the United Nations.

Diplomatic rank - Extraordinary and Plenipotentiary Envoy of the 2nd class (February 10, 2014).

Safronkov's speech at the meeting of the UN Security Council on April 12, 2017 attracted the attention of the world media. The video recording of Safronkov's speech at the meeting of the UN Security Council became a hit on the Internet and caused lively debate in the world about the boundaries of what is permitted for a diplomat.
