= Safronov, Volgograd Oblast =

Safronov Сафронов
- Khutor
- Location within Volgograd Oblast Location within Russia
- Coordinates: 47°44′N 43°05′E
- Country: Russia
- Region: Volgograd Oblast
- District: Kotelnikovsky District
- Time zone: UTC+4:00

Safronov (Russian: Сафронов) is a rural locality (a khutor) in Zakharovskoye Rural Settlement, Kotelnikovsky District, Volgograd Oblast, Russia. The population was 167 as of 2010. There are 4 streets.

== Geography ==
Safronov is located on the bank of the Tsimlyansk Reservoir, 17 km northwest of Kotelnikovo (the district's administrative centre) by road. Zakharov is the nearest rural locality.
