= Institute of Baltic Region History and Archaeology =

Research institute of Klaipėda University

Coordinates: 55°43′28″N 21°07′26″E

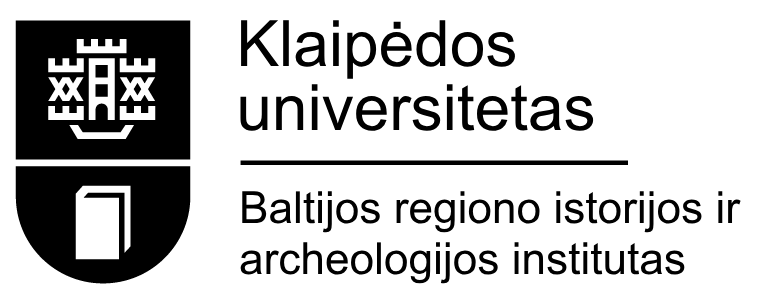
- Parent institution: Klaipėda University
- Established: 2003
- Focus: History of Western Lithuania and Prussia
- Director: Vasilijus Safronovas
- Address: Herkaus Manto g. 84 K4, 92294
- Location: Klaipėda, Lithuania
- Website: briai.ku.lt

Institute of Baltic Region History and Archaeology (Lithuanian: Baltijos regiono istorijos ir archeologijos institutas or BRIAI) is the scholarly research subdivision of Klaipėda University. It was established in 2003, following reorganization of the former Centre for the History of Western Lithuania and Prussia, which functioned in the period 1992 to 2003

The scholars of the Institute are involved in the research of changes in prehistoric and historic societies and cultures within the Baltic region by applying diverse scientific theories and methodologies.

== History ==
In their research activities, the staff of Centre for the History of Western Lithuania and Prussia focused upon investigation of the relations between the Order of the Teutonic Knights in Prussia and the Grand Duchy of Lithuania, development of societies of these states, the history of the German-Lithuanian relationships in the Prussian Lithuania, highlighting political and social turning points in the 20th century experienced by the former territory of East Prussia, and the past of the historical region of Samogitia. Historical and archaeological investigations of Klaipėda, Palanga and other towns and townships of Western Lithuania, as well as analysis of historical issues of the Kaliningrad Oblast and the former East Prussia were accomplished in the Centre for History.

In cooperation with the Polish scientists, the Centre for History initiated underwater archaeology, a research field new for Lithuania. In collaboration with the Nordostdeutsches Kulturwerk Institute in Lüneburg, collection of the archive indispensable for historical urban research work started in Klaipėda; the Cultural Centre of Thomas Mann was founded in Nida as a venue for cultural dialogue between different nations, etc.

The activities of the Centre in the years 1992–2003, with regard to the priorities of scientific research in the Baltic Sea Region, were coordinated by the Academic Board composed of scientists from Lithuania, Germany, Poland, Latvia and Sweden, which was headed by Dr Eckhard Matthes in 1993 to 1999, later by Professor Udo Arnold.

== Research activities ==
Researchers of the BRIAI conduct fundamental and applied scientific research in the following fields:

- Research of the Regional History
- Prehistory of the Baltic Region in the Contemporary Society
- Creation of the Digital Research Archive for Klaipėda Region and Samogitia (STA) and Publication of Sources
- Cultural Anthropology of the Baltic Region

Scholars of the Institute are involved in the studies process of Klaipėda University. Scientists of the Institute read lectures to bachelor's, master's and doctoral degree students majoring in history, and to the students majoring in archaeology and other branches of studies (such as, political sciences, philology), and supervise their scientific efforts.

== Publications ==
BRIAI publishes monographs, collection of articles, as well as two peer-reviewed research series dedicated to historical and archaeological research respectively.

- Acta Historica Universitatis Klaipedensis (published since 1993). Biannual publication presenting the results of the historical research, which are analyzed by BRIAI in conjunction mostly with European partners. The series containing collections of thematic articles remains the only such publication dedicated to the studies of regional history in Lithuania to this day. In addition to articles of Lithuanian researchers, it also publishes contributions by Polish, Russian, German, Latvian and other scholars.
- Archaeologia Baltica (the charge of its publishing was taken over by the archaeologists of the Institute in 2006; the first five volumes were prepared in the Lithuanian Institute of History in 1995–2002). The only archaeological research periodical issued in the English language in Lithuania, which publishes research works of multinational community of scholars featuring issues of archaeology in the region of the Baltic Sea and the latest insights of investigators in this field.

== Staff ==
Directors of the institute: Assoc. Professor, Dr Alvydas Nikžentaitis in 1992–1993, Assoc. Professor, Dr Vladas Žulkus in 1993–1998, Professor Stephen Christopher Rowell, PhD (Cantab.) in 1998–1999, Dr Vacys Vaivada in 1999–2001, Professor, Dr Habil. Vladas Žulkus in 2001–2002, Dr Silva Pocytė since 2002.
