= Afanasy Safronov =

Red Army major general

Afanasy Ivanovich Safronov
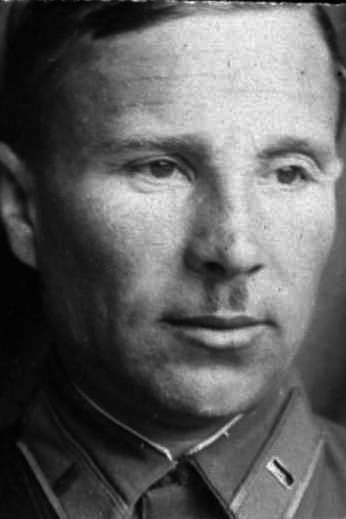
- Safronov in the late 1930s
- Born: 22 October 1903; Smolensk, Russian Empire
- Died: 18 March 1944 (aged 40); Leningrad Oblast, Soviet Union
- Military career
- Allegiance: Soviet Union
- Branch: Red Army
- Service years: 1924–1944
- Rank: Major general
- Commands: 118th Rifle Division; 48th Rifle Division
- Conflicts: World War II (DOW)
- Awards: Order of the Red Banner (2)

Afanasy Ivanovich Safronov (Russian: Афанасий Иванович Сафронов; 22 October 1903 – 18 March 1944) was a Red Army major general who held division command during World War II.

Safronov rose to division chief of staff in the prewar Red Army. He fought in the Baltic defensive operation and the Siege of Leningrad before taking command of the 48th Rifle Division in September 1941. Safronov led the division in the defense of the Oranienbaum bridgehead and the Krasnoye Selo–Ropsha offensive. He died of wounds received in the Narva offensive during March 1944.

== Early life and prewar service ==
Afanasy Ivanovich Safronov was born on 22 October 1903 in Smolensk. He worked as a metalworker for the Mobile Workshop Services of the Centralized Oryol–Vitebsk Railway. Safronov chose a military career and was admitted to the Western Infantry School in Smolensk on 1 October 1924. After the disbandment of the school he was transferred to the Ryazan Infantry School in September 1926. On graduation in September 1927, Safronov was posted to the 27th Separate Territorial Rifle Battalion of the 9th Separate Territorial Rifle Regiment in Borisoglebsk, where he served as a platoon commander, acting paymaster and quartermaster, and assistant chief of staff of a battalion. In May 1931 he returned to the Ryazan Infantry School as a course (year of study) commander. Safronov was admitted to the Frunze Military Academy for advanced training in April 1932. Safronov did not complete all four years, being dismissed due to illness after completing his third year in May 1935, and was appointed assistant chief of the 1st (operational) section of the staff of the 64th Rifle Division in Smolensk.

He was transferred to serve as chief of staff of the 144th Rifle Regiment of the 48th Rifle Division at Vyshny Volochyok in February 1937. In May 1938 Safronov was appointed assistant chief of staff of the 11th Rifle Division at Kingisepp. In October he was sent to complete the Commander Improvement Courses at the Academy of the General Staff, and upon graduation in April 1939 returned to the 11th Rifle Division as its chief of staff. Safronov was selected by the Military Council of the Leningrad Military District, as the best division chief of staff, to serve in the same position with the 16th Rifle Division, sent to Estonia in January 1940 under the forced basing of Soviet troops there. On arrival in the Baltic Special Military District the division was assigned to the 65th Special Rifle Corps.

== World War II ==
After Germany invaded the Soviet Union, Safronov's division was assigned to the 27th Army of the Northwestern Front and deployed in the region of Tallinn. Its units covered the coast of the Baltic Sea, defending Tallinn and the south coast of the Gulf of Finland from the threat of amphibious landing. In early July the 16th Division, with two regiments, concentrated south of Tallinn. On 8 July German troops broke through from Pärnu to the Märjamaa region. Subsequently, the 16th fought in defense of Tallinn, and its elements operated on the Narva axis as part of the 8th Army.

Then-Colonel Safronov was appointed commander of the 118th Rifle Division on 19 August. On 27 September, the remnants of the division were merged into the 48th Rifle Division, which Safronov took command of. He led the division in defensive battles on the approaches to Oranienbaum, and during the Siege of Leningrad it defended part of the Oranienbaum bridgehead. The division strengthened its defensive zone, conducted reconnaissance and created solid fortifications for all of 1942 and until May 1943. For his leadership of the division in the bridgehead, Safronov was recommended for the Order of the Red Banner, which he was awarded on 26 May 1943:

Colonel Safronov has been in the fight against the German occupiers for more than 20 months without a break, steadfastly ensuring the defense of the city of Leningrad on the Petergof axis, that is, the main defense sector of the Coastal Operational Group.

The 48th Rifle Division under the command of Comrade Safronov steadfastly and courageously repulsed and repulses all attempts of the enemy to dislodge it from the defensive line. In the entire period of defense the 48th Rifle Division did not give up a single meter of Soviet ground, actively struggles with the strong enemy, not giving him an hour of calm.

Colonel Safronov organized repeated successful reconnaissance operations, more than 300 snipers lie in wait for the enemy around the clock and wipe him out.

More than 200 soldiers and commanders of the 48th Rifle Division have been awarded orders and medals for heroic feats. Comrade Safronov, through systematic education and combat training, brought up such snipers as Stefanyuk, Sergeyev, Tatyanichev, Smirnov, Babeyevsky and heroes like Ya. I. Pozdnyakov, selflessly fighting for the Homeland.

The 48th M. I. Kalinin Rifle Division is a combat-ready unit thanks to the great merit of its permanent commander Colonel Safronov.

He is deserving of a state award: the Order of the Red Banner.

A note to the award recommendation mentioned that Safronov had never been captured or listed as missing. The division handed over its sector to the 168th Rifle Division on 18 May 1943 and was withdrawn to the reserve of the Coastal Operational Group, where it remained until January 1944. Safronov was promoted to the rank of major general on 25 September 1943.

Safronov led the 48th in the Krasnoye Selo–Ropsha offensive, which began on 14 January. The division received the Ropsha honorific on 21 January for fully breaking the Siege of Leningrad on the Ropsha axis. In the offensive, the division sustained heavy losses of 2,094 killed and 5,036 wounded. For his performance in the offensive, Safronov was recommended for a second Order of the Red Banner, which he was awarded on 17 February. The citation read:

The Red Banner Rifle Division, led by Comrade Safronov, during the breakthrough of the enemy defenses between 14 and 18 January 1944, successfully fulfilled the objectives set before it.

Officers and soldiers of the units of the division showed skill in the conduct of modern battle during the carrying out of combat objectives.

During the operation, Comrade Safronov always personally led the combat operations of the division from his observation post, and simultaneously assigned additional objectives to the units as the situation required, to quicken the pace of the battle.

Leading the division, Comrade Safronov displayed courage, steadfastness and skill in directing the main forces of the division to the completion of the main objectives.

For the successful accomplishment of combat objectives of the division and displaying courage and self-possession during this, Comrade Safronov is worthy of the Order of the Red Banner state award.

The 48th Rifle Division was transferred to the 30th Guards Rifle Corps on 24 February and relocated to the region of Sooküla, where it went on the offensive on 25 February. In the ensuing fighting along the Narva, known as the Narva offensive, Safronov was seriously concussed by the explosion of a heavy 220 mm shell while at his observation post on 16 March and died in the hospital on 18 March.

== Awards ==
Safronov was a recipient of the following decorations:

- Order of the Red Banner (2)
- Medal "For the Defence of Leningrad"
