= Sofronovo, Nikolsky District, Vologda Oblast =

Sofronovo Софроново
- Village
- Location within Vologda Oblast Location within Russia
- Coordinates: 59°51′N 45°07′E
- Country: Russia
- Region: Vologda Oblast
- District: Nikolsky District
- Time zone: UTC+3:00

Sofronovo (Russian: Софроново) is a rural locality (a village) in Argunovskoye Rural Settlement, Nikolsky District, Vologda Oblast, Russia. The population was 38 as of 2002.

== Geography ==
Sofronovo is located 46 km northwest of Nikolsk (the district's administrative centre) by road. Dyachkovo is the nearest rural locality.
