= Sofronovo, Melenkovsky District, Vladimir Oblast =

Sofronovo Софроново
- Village
- Location within Vladimir Oblast Location within Russia
- Coordinates: 55°24′N 41°22′E
- Country: Russia
- Region: Vladimir Oblast
- District: Melenkovsky District
- Time zone: UTC+3:00

Sofronovo (Russian: Софро́ново) is a rural locality (a village) in Danilovskoye Rural Settlement, Melenkovsky District, Vladimir Oblast, Russia. The population was 393 as of 2010. There are 3 streets.

== Geography ==
Sofronovo is located 20 km northwest of Melenki (the district's administrative centre) by road. Danilovo is the nearest rural locality.
