= Safronovskaya, Vologda Oblast =

Safronovskaya Сафроновская
- Village
- Location within Vologda Oblast Location within Russia
- Coordinates: 60°38′N 42°40′E
- Country: Russia
- Region: Vologda Oblast
- District: Verkhovazhsky District
- Time zone: UTC+3:00

Safronovskaya (Russian: Сафроновская) is a rural locality (a village) in Sibirskoye Rural Settlement, Verkhovazhsky District, Vologda Oblast, Russia. The population was 15 as of 2002.

== Geography ==
Safronovskaya is located 42 km southeast of Verkhovazhye (the district's administrative centre) by road. Voronikha is the nearest rural locality.
