= Safronovskaya, Arkhangelsk Oblast =

Safronovskaya Сафроновская
- Village
- Location within Arkhangelsk Oblast Location within Russia
- Coordinates: 62°45′N 43°16′E
- Country: Russia
- Region: Arkhangelsk Oblast
- District: Vinogradovsky District
- Time zone: UTC+3:00

Safronovskaya (Russian: Сафроновская) is a rural locality (a village) in Vinogradovsky District, Arkhangelsk Oblast, Russia. The population was 4 as of 2010.

== Geography ==
Safronovskaya is located 32 km southeast of Bereznik (the district's administrative centre) by road. Konetsgorye is the nearest rural locality.
