= Klaipėda University =

University in Lithuania

Coordinates: 55°43′28.53″N 21°07′25.64″E

- Klaipėdos universitetas
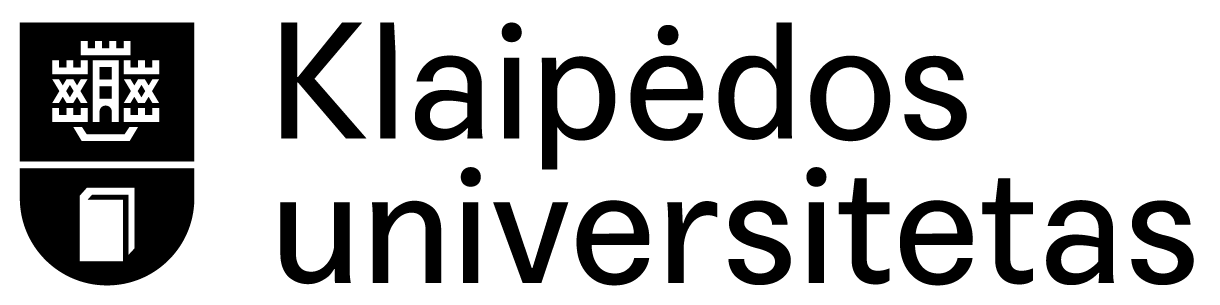
- Type: Public
- Established: 1991; 35 years ago
- Budget: €24.7 million (2022)
- Rector: prof. dr. Artūras Razbdauskas
- Administrative staff: 504 (2019)
- Students: 2,697 (2019)
- Location: Klaipėda, Lithuania
- Website: www.ku.lt

University rankings

Regional – Overall
- QS Emerging Europe and Central Asia: 131 (2022)

Klaipėda University (Lithuanian: Klaipėdos universitetas or KU) is a university in the Lithuanian port city of Klaipėda.

== Overview ==
Klaipėda University was formally founded on 1 January 1991, by a decree of the Seimas (the Lithuanian parliament). The new university incorporated existing institutions of higher education in the city. At its inception, it comprised 3,000 students and three faculties (Humanities and Natural Sciences, Marine Engineering, and Pedagogy). It has since grown to seven faculties and eight institutes: the faculties of Natural Science and Mathematics, Humanities, Marine Engineering, Art, Pedagogy, Social Sciences, and Health Sciences; Maritime Institute, Seascape Institute, Institute of Continuing Studies, Coastal Research and Planning Institute, Institute of Baltic Sea Region History and Archaeology, Institute of Regional Policy and Planning, Mechatronics Institute, and Musicology Institute. Having 4000 students and 600 persons in educational staff (in 2017), the university offers 54 undergraduate (bachelor's degree), 4 specialized professional, 48 graduate (master's degree), and 11 postgraduate (doctoral) study programs.

== Historic structures of the university campus ==
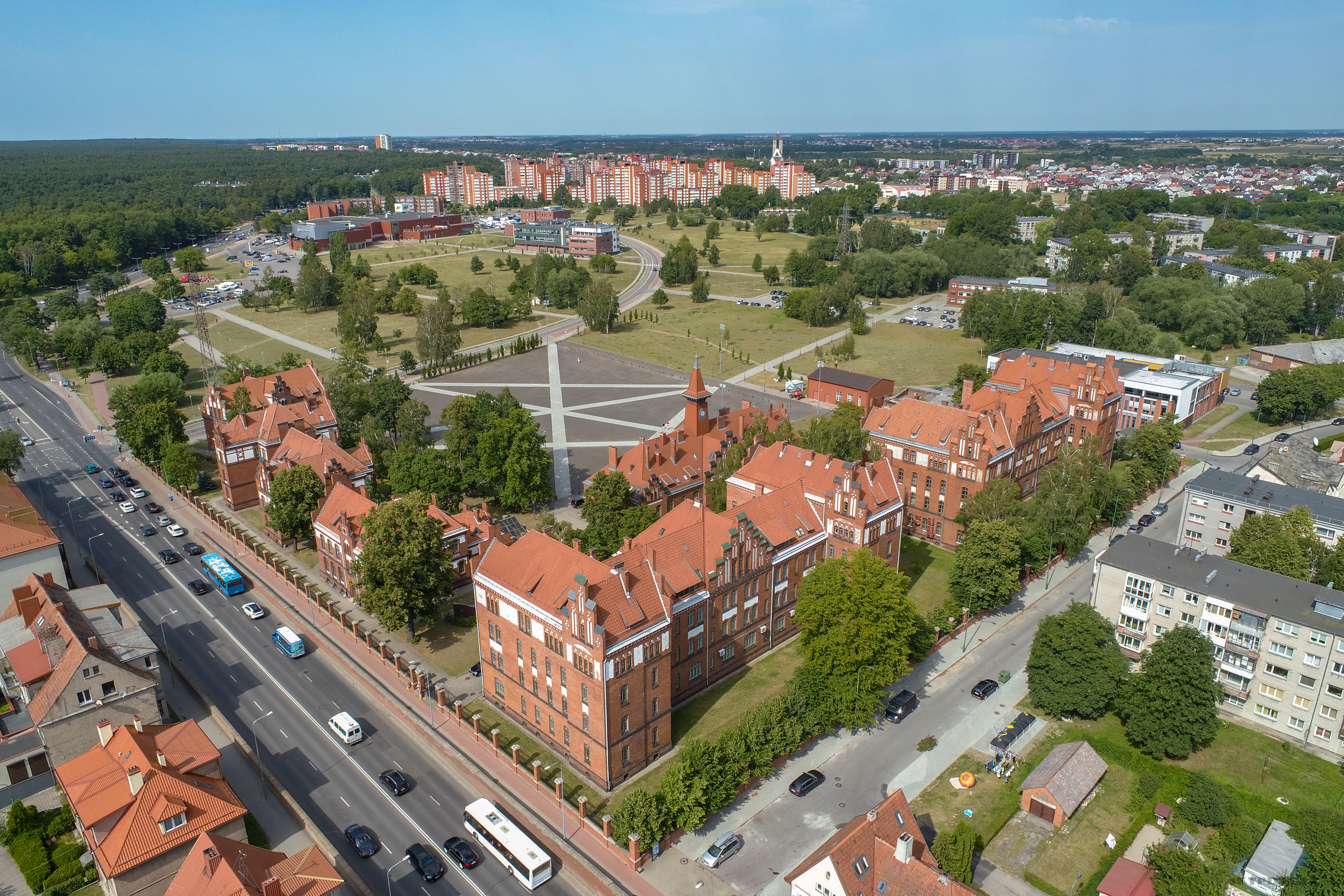
Historic buildings on the campus of Klaipėda University

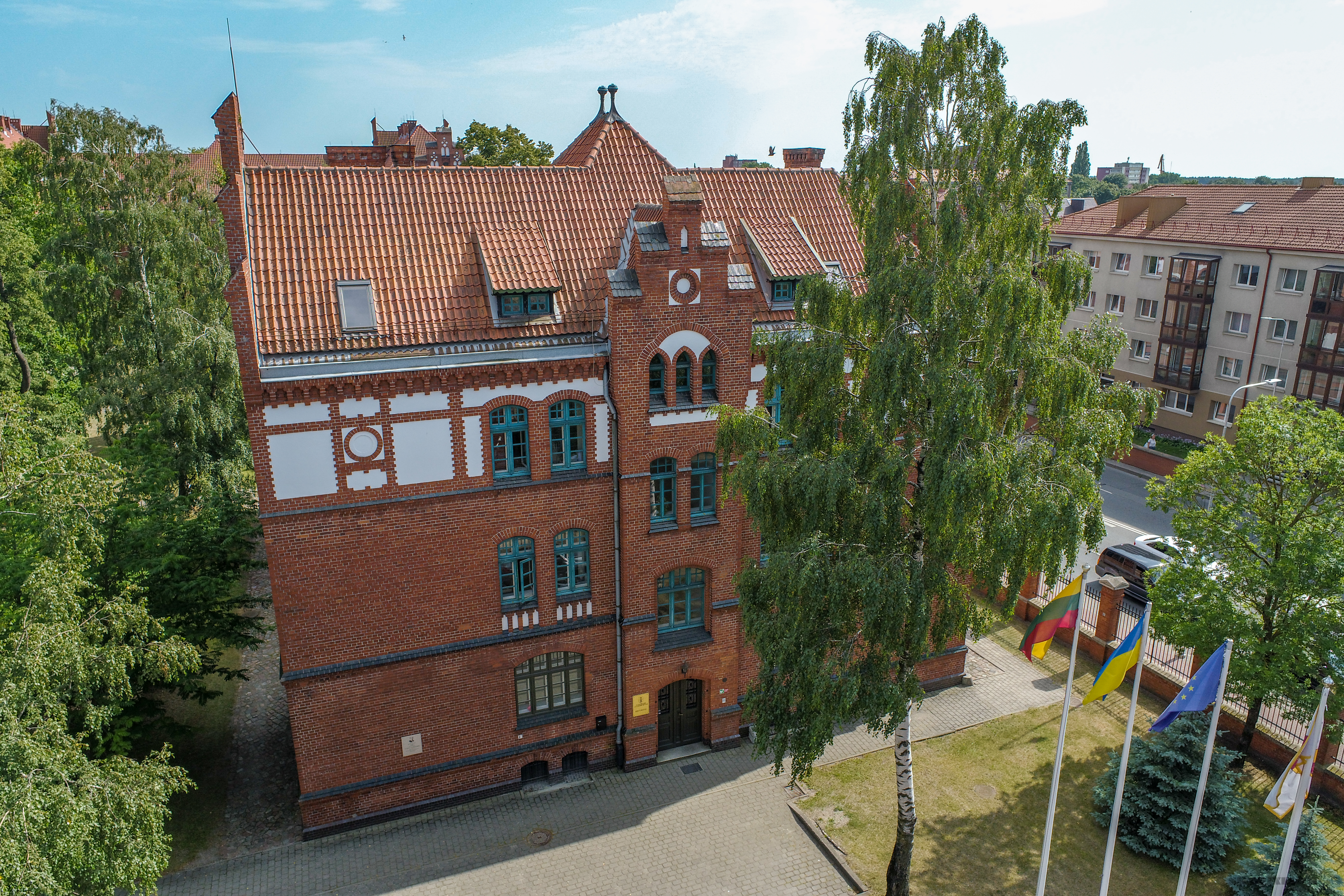
Rectorate

Klaipėda University occupies a former military campus. The territory of 23.6 hectares (58 acres) contains six Neo-Gothic buildings that have been declared architectural monuments. In the first half of the 20th century these four-story red brick buildings, erected by the Germans in 1904–1907, comprised two residential blocks for servicemen, a chapel-canteen-club, HQ and a guardhouse, a residential block for officers and an storehouse for uniforms. During the 20th century it was a base for, successively, German, French, Lithuanian and Soviet troops.

== Students and studies ==
Klaipėda University offers a developed three-level study system: 58 bachelor, 2 specialized vocational, 56 master, 10 doctoral study programs. It also offers 7 international study programs for foreign students. Its location in a seaport determined that the university develops academic programs not found in other Lithuanian universities, including marine environment research and engineering of marine transport, hydrology and oceanography, port technologies and engineering, history and languages of Lithuania Minor and Baltic region, ecological engineering, landscape architecture, underwater archaeology, port technology, and naval engineering.

== Structure ==
KU Marine Research Institute

Business Incubator

Klaipėda University is an autonomous state study and science institution of the Lithuanian Republic. The highest authority in the university is its Council. The Council is a collegial governing body of the university, formed according to the Law on Science and Studies under which the management of state schools of higher education includes not only the representatives of academic community but those of public as well. The Council provides strategic objectives of the university, affirms the vision and mission of the university, elects the rector and ensures accountability and contact with society and the founders.

The Senate is a collegial body managing the academic affairs of the university. The Senate of Klaipėda University operates in accordance with the Statute of Klaipėda University.

Daily University is led by the rector who represents the university and operates on behalf of the university. The rector uses the assistance of the vice–rector for research and academic affairs, vice–rector for infrastructure and development affairs, of the seven deans of the faculties, of the directors of the three scientific and two studies institutes, of the president of the students union, and of rector's office units.

Rapidly developing Klaipėda University has more than 2,800 students and 900 staff, including 550 professors, associate professors and lecturers studying and working in:

3 faculties:

- Faculty of Social science and Humanities
- Faculty of Marine Technologies and Natural Sciences
- Faculty of Health Sciences

2 institutes:

- Marine Research Institute
- Institute of Baltic Region History and Archaeology

and other structural units:

- Laboratories
- Library
- Virtual Learning Center
- Botanical Garden
- Publishing Office

Klaipėda University owns Brabander – the largest Lithuanian exploratory – sail training vessel, designed for students’ practice and marine expeditions. On 18 January 2008 by the decision of University Senate an independent structural element – laboratory scientific research and training sailing vessel BRABANDER was established. The university also owns the yacht Odisėja for marine expeditions and sail training. On 14 November 2014 acquired a new special research vessel Mintis which was funded by the project “Creation of Marine Valley Nucleus and the Renewal of Studies Infrastructure (JŪRA)”.

== International cooperation ==
Klaipėda University established the International Relations Office in 1992. It helps to implement the university's policy concerning its relations with foreign higher education institutions.

In 2019, Klaipėda University joined the EU-CONEXUS which is an international alliance of coastal cities universities aiming to enhance cooperation between them.

== Rectors ==
- Donatas Švitra (1991–1993)
- Stasys Vaitekūnas (1993–2001)
- Vladas Žulkus (2002-2011)
- Vaidutis Laurėnas (2011-2014)
- Eimutis Juzeliūnas (2014–2018)
- Artūras Razbadauskas (2019–present)

== Notable persons ==
- Minister of Internal Affairs and Member of Parliament Agnė Bilotaitė studied political sciences at Klaipėda University.
- Former mayor of Kaunas Vytautas Šustauskas and member of Parliament studied management at Klaipėda University.
- Lithuanian sports commentator, TV presenter, writer Robertas Petrauskas studied history at Klaipėda University.
- Lithuanian singer Jurijus Veklenko studied tourism and recreation at Klaipėda University.
- Mayor of Palanga municipality Šarūnas Vaitkus studied tourism and recreation at Klaipėda University.
