= 165th Rifle Division =

165th Rifle Division (July 8, 1940 - December 27, 1941) 165th Rifle Division (December 1941 - July 1945)
- Active: 1940–1945
- Country: Soviet Union
- Branch: Red Army
- Type: Infantry
- Size: Division
- Engagements: Battle of Kiev (1941); Battle of Lyuban; Battle of Krasny Bor; Mga offensive Battle of Nevel (1943); Pustoshka-Idritsa offensive Operation Bagration; Lublin–Brest offensive Vistula–Oder offensive East Pomeranian offensive Battle of Berlin
- Decorations: Order of the Red Banner (2nd Formation); Order of Kutuzov (2nd Formation)
- Battle honours: Siedlce (2nd Formation)

Commanders
- Notable commanders: Col. Ivan Vasilevich Zakharevich; Col. Pavel Ivanovich Solenov; Col. Vasilii Ivanovich Morozov; Col. Nikolai Ivanovich Kaladze

The 165th Rifle Division was originally formed as an infantry division of the Red Army in the North Caucasus Military District in July 1940, based on the shtat (table of organization and equipment) of September 13, 1939. It was still in that District at the time of the German invasion, and it was soon moved to the vicinity of Kyiv as part of Southwestern Front. It would remain defending south of the Ukrainian capital into September, eventually as part of 37th Army, when it was deeply encircled and destroyed.

A new 165th was created in January 1942 in the Ural Military District based on a 400-series division that began forming the previous month. After forming up until April it was sent west by rail where it was assigned to Leningrad Front. In early June, as part of 59th Army, it took part in attacks to re-establish ground communications with the encircled 2nd Shock Army, but suffered heavy losses without gaining any meaningful success. It was then withdrawn to second echelon, now in 52nd Army of Volkhov Front, where it remained until February 1943. when it was thrown into another abortive operation south of Leningrad, again suffering heavy casualties. During late July and early August, as part of 8th Army of the same Front, it took part in the Fifth Sinyavino Offensive, which attempted to cut off the forces of German 18th Army north of Mga, but this bloody affair did little but add to the massive casualties on both sides. In September the 165th left the fighting front and entered the Reserve of the Supreme High Command for rebuilding, and began moving west. In mid-October it arrived in 2nd Baltic Front near Nevel, where it was first assigned to 3rd Shock Army and then to 6th Guards Army in the fighting that went on into the winter both inside and outside the salient that had formed there. During February 1944 the division returned to the Reserve of the Supreme High Command for another move to the south and west, ending up in the 47th Army near Kovel, which soon became part of 1st Belorussian Front. In the second phase of the summer offensive against Army Group Center in July the 165th distinguished itself and was awarded the Order of the Red Banner as well as an honorific for its role in the capture of Siedlce. Prior to the 1945 winter offensive into Poland it was transferred to 70th Army, which was soon shifted to 2nd Belorussian Front, and the division remained under these commands for the duration. As it advanced it helped to break the German defenses north of Warsaw and was later awarded the Order of Kutuzov, 2nd Degree. As the campaign continued into East Pomerania in March the 165th played a large role in the capture of Gdynia and several of its subunits were given battle honors or decorations. Soon after it regrouped with its Front west to the lower reaches of the Oder River for the final advance into central Germany in late April. The division ended the war on the coast of the Baltic Sea, and in June several of its subunits were decorated for the capture of Stettin and several nearby towns. By this time orders had come to disband it in place, which was carried out in July.

== 1st Formation ==
The division first began forming on July 8, 1940, at Ordzhonikidze in the North Caucasus Military District. Its order of battle on June 22, 1941, was as follows:

- 562nd Rifle Regiment
- 641st Rifle Regiment
- 751st Rifle Regiment
- 608th Artillery Regiment
- 199th Antitank Battalion
- 451st Antiaircraft Battalion
- 199th Reconnaissance Battalion
- 206th Sapper Battalion
- 305th Signal Battalion
- 164th Medical/Sanitation Battalion
- 153rd Chemical Defense (Anti-gas) Platoon
- 199th Motor Transport Battalion
- 155th Field Postal Station
- 41st Field Office of the State Bank

Col. Ivan Vasilevich Zakharevich took command of the division on July 16, where he would remain for the duration of the 1st formation. At the start of the German invasion it was part of 64th Rifle Corps, with the 175th Rifle Division. After a brief period to complete its mobilization it began moving by rail, with its Corps, toward the front in early July, concentrating at Rudnevka by July 12. 64th Corps was now in the reserves of Southwestern Front.

=== Defense of Kyiv ===
The 13th and 14th Panzer Divisions reached the Irpin River west of Kyiv on July 11 after breaking through Southwestern Front near Zhytomyr. The German command was divided on plans to directly attack Kyiv to seize its crossings over the Dniepr River, but by July 13 German reconnaissance made it clear that Soviet fortifications and troop concentrations ruled out any possibility of taking the city by surprise. Kyiv would remain in Soviet hands for more than two further months. At about the same time the 64th Corps moved into positions along the Irpin, with the 175th west and southwest of Boiarka, and the 165th further southwest. In Order No. 034/op of August 1 the commander of the Southwestern Direction, Marshal S. M. Budyonny, wrote:

For a long time now, the 64th Rifle Corps has been demonstrating low combat effectiveness. Both divisions of this corps, and especially the 165th, leave the battlefield at the first appearance of the enemy. On July 31, the 165th division again failed to fulfil its combat mission and retreated to the Vasilkov line.

During late July and into early August the XXIX Army Corps of German 6th Army made numerous attempts to capture Kyiv, but all of these were foiled. As German forces advanced on Boiarka 64th Corps was split apart, with the 165th pushed across the Dniepr and the 175th falling back by August 11 into the Kiev Fortified Region, defending the city's southwestern sector. As of the beginning of the month the Corps was being disbanded and the 165th came under direct command of Southwestern Front. Later in August it was subordinated to the new 37th Army, which was tasked with continuing the defense of Kyiv. Meanwhile, the 2nd Panzer Group and 2nd Army of Army Group Center began their drives southward. By September 10 the remnants of 5th and 37th Armies were grouped north of Kozelets but on September 16 the 2nd Panzer linked up with the 1st Panzer Group of Army Group South well to the east and the Army was deeply encircled. As of September 15 the 165th had been effectively destroyed, but in common with most of the encircled divisions of Southwestern Front it officially remained on the books until December 27, when it was finally written off.

== 2nd Formation ==
The 436th Rifle Division began forming in December 1941 until January 23, 1942 at Kurgan in the Ural Military District. On the latter date it was redesignated as the new 165th Rifle Division. Its order of battle was very similar to that of the 1st formation:

- 562nd Rifle Regiment
- 641st Rifle Regiment
- 751st Rifle Regiment
- 608th Artillery Regiment
- 199th Antitank Battalion
- 199th Reconnaissance Company
- 202nd Sapper Battalion
- 305th Signal Battalion (later 305th Signal Company)
- 164th Medical/Sanitation Battalion
- 533rd Chemical Defense (Anti-gas) Platoon
- 199th Motor Transport Company
- 149th Field Bakery
- 914th Divisional Veterinary Hospital
- 1670th Field Postal Station
- 1091st Field Office of the State Bank

Col. Pavel Ivanovich Solenov was appointed to command on the date of redesignation. The division remained forming and training in the Ural District into April, when it began moving west by rail, joining the 6th Guards Rifle Corps in Leningrad Front by the beginning of May. When it left the Urals the 165th was at full strength with over 12,000 officers and enlisted personnel allotted. It joined the active army on May 7.

== Battle of Lyuban ==
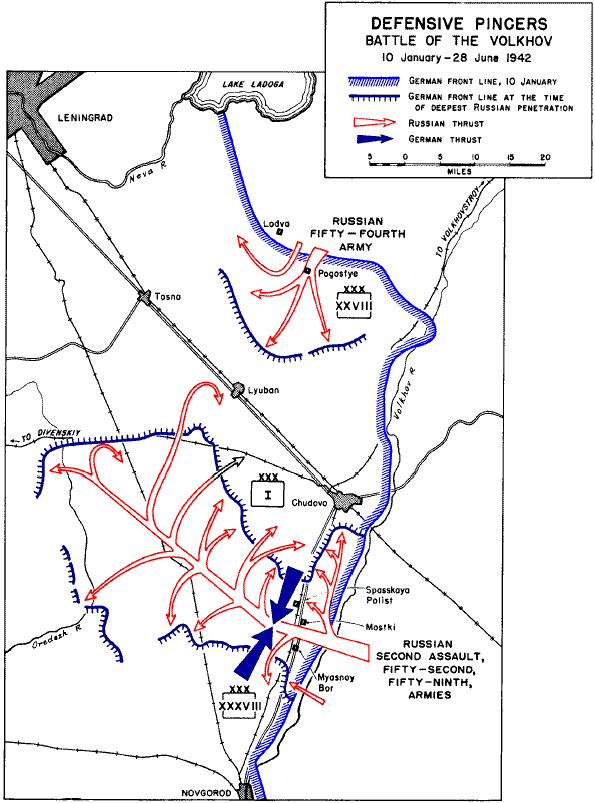
Battle of Lyuban

By late April the Red Army's winter counteroffensive had wound down to a halt from sheer exhaustion without many of the STAVKA's objectives being attained. One of these was breaking the siege of Leningrad. 2nd Shock and 54th Armies attempted to break through to the city from the south and east beginning in early January but 2nd Shock had become immobilized in a deep salient without reaching the initial objective of Lyuban. By May it was necessary to rescue the Army from its predicament in the forests and thawing swamps. It had been encircled in late March, but soon partially relieved when a narrow corridor was forced through the German lines near Miasnoi Bor. This route became practically useless when it was flooded by the spring rains.

On April 30 the commander of the recently designated Volkhov Group of Forces, Lt. Gen. M. S. Khozin, ordered the commander of 2nd Shock, Lt. Gen. A. A. Vlasov, to take up an all-round defense. Meanwhile, Khozin began planning for a new operation to enlarge the corridor between Miasnoi Bor and Spasskaya Polist, which was submitted to the STAVKA on May 2. To this end the 6th Guards Corps was to be reinforced with the 4th and 24th Guards Rifle Divisions plus the 24th and 58th Rifle Brigades, all of which required refitting, which was to be completed by mid-May. The Corps was then to widen the corridor, reinforce 2nd Shock, and join in a combined attack with 59th Army to encircle and eliminate the German forces in the Chudovo area. On May 12 Khozin reported that German reinforcements were arriving at Spasskaya Polist and north of Lyubtsy, which seemed to indicate another effort would be made to cut 2nd Shock's communications. He now directed Vlasov to prepare for a breakout operation by stages.

The breakout battle began on May 16 and continued for several days, but proved largely futile, at significant cost to both those inside and outside the pocket. At 1720 hours on May 21 the STAVKA sent orders for 2nd Shock to break out once and for all and to clear German forces from the east bank of the Volkhov River at Kirishi and Gruzino no later than June 1. Also on May 21 orders arrived to send 6th Guards Corps, minus the 165th, to reinforce Northwestern Front's operations in the Demyansk region. By now, 2nd Shock had lost as much as 70 percent of its original strength and was lacking all types of supplies. On May 24 it began the first phase of its withdrawal from its most advanced positions, and Army Group became alarmed that it might escape. To this end, on May 30 the XXXVIII and I Army Corps launched a joint attack to finally cut the corridor to the pocket. This was complete by noon on May 31. In a desperate effort to reopen the gap the 165th was thrown into battle near Miasnoi Bor on June 1, without artillery support, and soon lost 50 percent of its combat strength without any success, and was replaced by the 374th Rifle Division. The division returned to the attack on June 5, gaining some 700m-800m. The inspector of Leningrad Front's political department, Sen. Battalion Commissar Roginskii, reported:

From the very beginning of the offensive, there was disorganization and poor management on the part of the command staff.
At 14:00, a mass escape from the battlefield of fighters began, including some of the middle command staff, and only through measures taken by the [political] workers of the Army, the Front Command Post, as well as individual commanders and political workers of the division, was the escape from the battlefield stopped. As a result, the division lost the initiative in the offensive and retreated to its original position.

On June 17 Khozin removed Colonel Solenov from command, replacing him with Col. Vasilii Ivanovich Morozov, who had been leading the 58th Rifle Brigade. The 165th remained in the breakthrough area and on June 23 managed to briefly link up with 2nd Shock in the Teremets-Kurlyandskii area. This was part of a final effort by 59th and 2nd Shock Armies which saw some 6,000 men escape from the trap before all communications with the pocket were lost and organized efforts ceased.

=== Battle of Krasny Bor ===
As of the beginning of July the 165th was pulled back to the second echelon of 52nd Army facing Spasskaya Polist. This Army was part of the re-formed Volkhov Front and the division would remain in the same general area while it was slowly rebuilt until January 1943. In January 1943 it was moved to the Front reserves and then joined 54th Army, still in Volkhov Front. The division re-entered combat on February 16 as part of that Army's Krasnoborsk-Smerdinsk operation south of Pogoste. The 165th attacked with the 7th Guards Tank Brigade and 14th Rifle Brigade in an effort to cut the Shapki–Lyuban road, but the only actual accomplishment was to temporarily break the encirclement of Morozov's former 58th Brigade. This was followed by a German counterattack which enveloped the 641st Rifle Regiment and other elements of the division plus the 7th Guards Tanks. Some of the troops escaped the trap on February 21 and the next day heavy fighting broke out throughout the division's zone which even involved Morozov's headquarters.

=== Mga Offensive ===
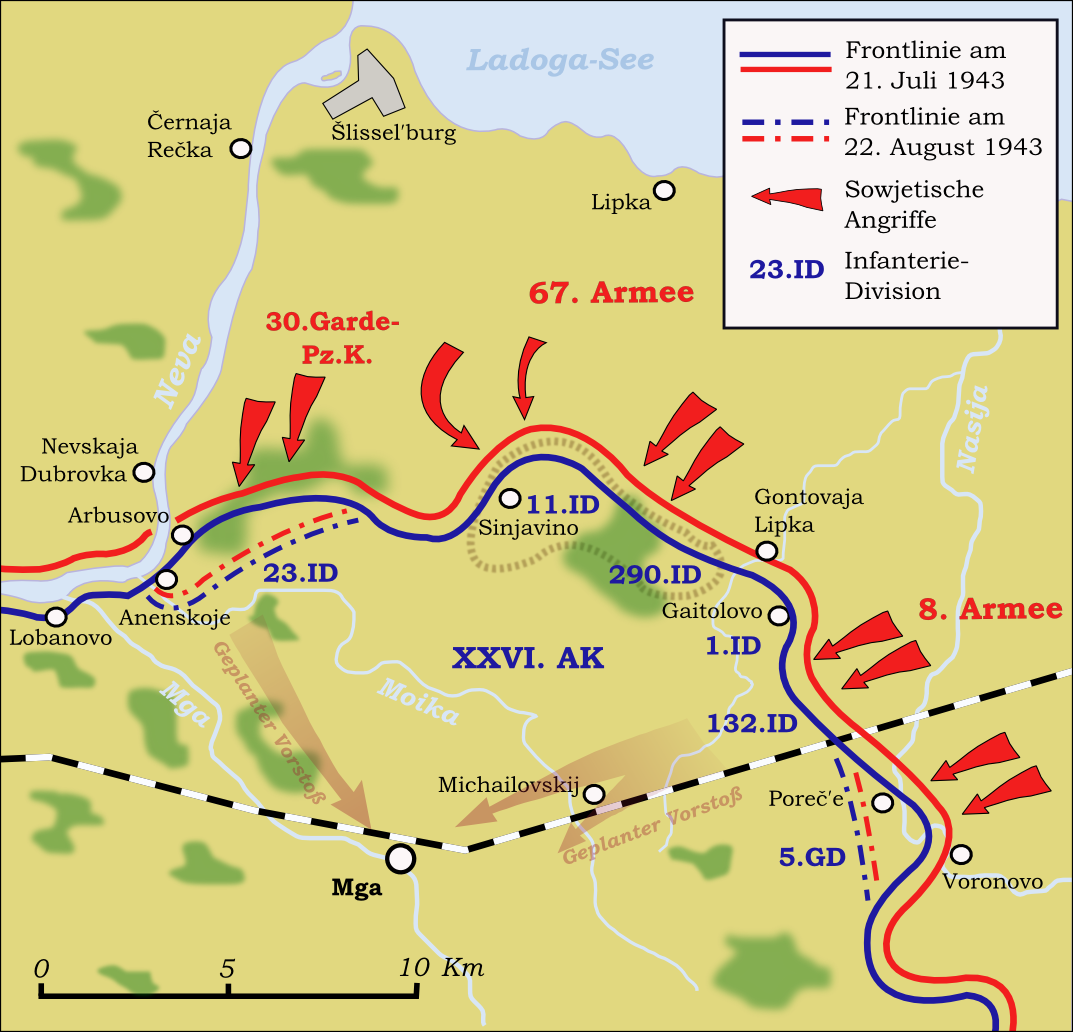
Mga (5th Sinyavino) Offensive, July 22 - September 25, 1943

In March the 165th left 54th Army and returned to Front control where it remained until July, when it was assigned to 8th Army of the same Front. Operation Iskra in January had restored land communications with Leningrad, but the corridor south of Lake Ladoga remained narrow and dominated by German artillery observers on the heights near the village of Sinyavino. This led the STAVKA to order a fifth offensive to finally take this place. The town of Mga was at the base of a wide salient with Sinyavino at the tip, and the plan was to envelop the salient using the forces of Leningrad Front's 55th and 67th Armies and Volkhov Front's 8th Army. The latter was due east of Mga and was to make its main thrust on a 13.6 km sector in the Voronovo area, penetrate the defenses, and link up with the Leningrad Front armies driving down from the north while detaching two rifle divisions and a tank brigade to strike at Sinyavino from the south. The Army was also to make a supporting attack in the area north of Pogoste on the Mga–Kirishi rail line.

In order to penetrate the strong German defenses the Army commander, Lt. Gen. F. N. Starikov, organized his main forces into two shock groups. The 165th was in the second echelon of the southern shock group along with the 374th Rifle Division. The offensive was preceded by six days of artillery fire on the enemy positions, which were held by the 5th Mountain Division. Despite the careful preparations the attack stalled after capturing the forward German trenches. Starikov made several efforts to renew the drive, including committing the 165th and 379th Rifle Divisions from second echelon in late July, but with little effect. The 132nd Infantry Division arrived in the nick of time to reinforce 5th Mountain before it collapsed. On August 9 reconnaissance elements of Starikov's shock groups found what they took as a weak point in the defenses around a small bridgehead on the east bank of the Naziia River held by 5th Mountain. He ordered in additional forces to support the 165th and two other divisions already fighting in the area, and although the defenders were nearly encircled and the Pogoste heights were taken, the effort subsequently stalled. The bridgehead was taken after it was evacuated overnight on August 14/15 but by then the offensive had collapsed in utter exhaustion, although the STAVKA did not officially end it until August 22. The 165th had again suffered heavy casualties in the two rifle regiments it had in first echelon. By the end of the month it had returned to direct Front command; on September 29 it was assigned to the Reserve of the Supreme High Command and began moving west. It was soon assigned to the 93rd Rifle Corps.

== Battle of Nevel ==
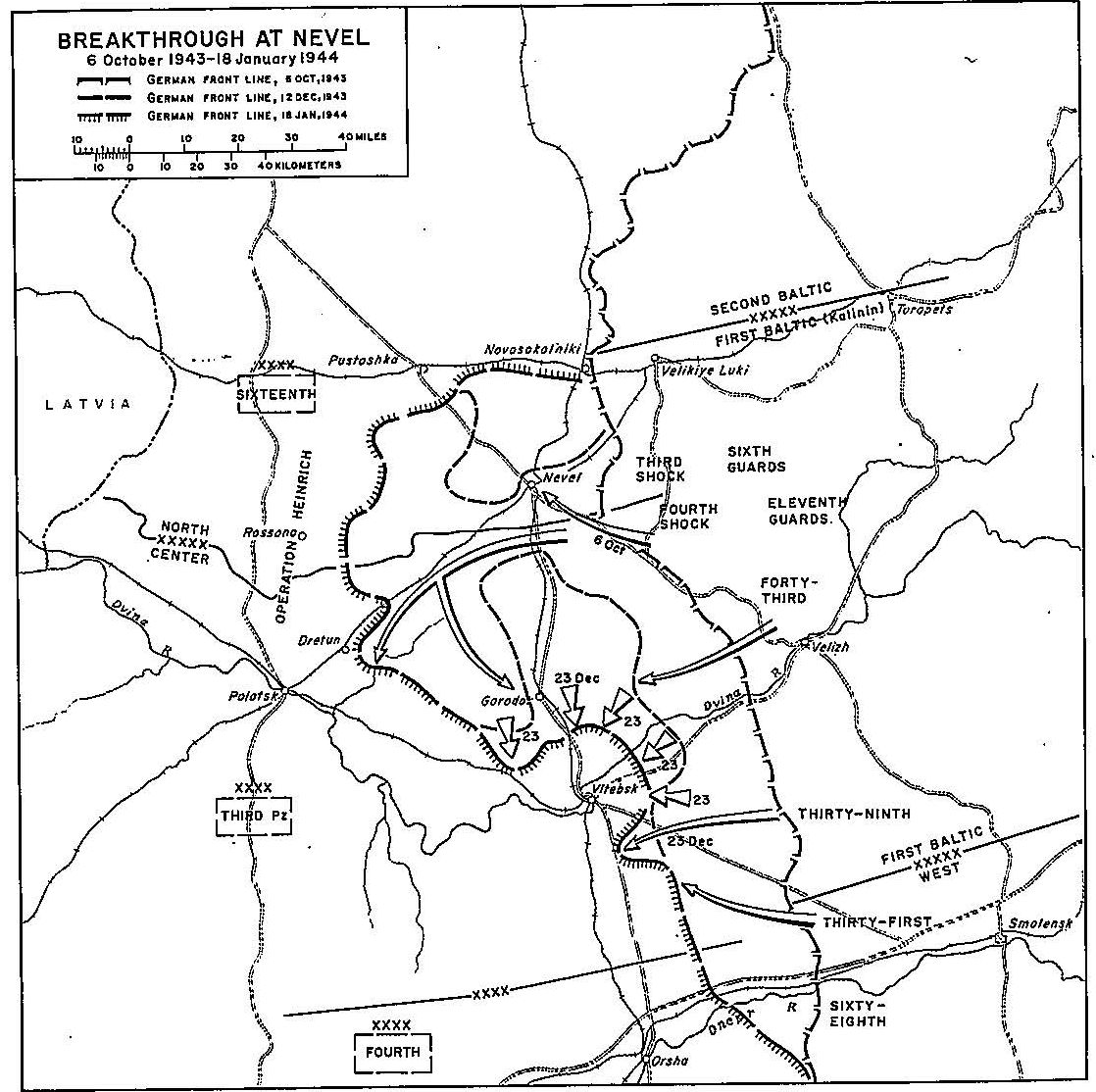
Battle of Nevel (October 1943 - January 1944)

The 165th returned to active service on October 15 when 93rd Corps was assigned to 3rd Shock Army in 2nd Baltic Front. The Corps also had the 379th Division under command. On October 6 the 3rd and 4th Shock Armies had scored a surprise success at the boundary of Army Groups North and Center, routing the 2nd Luftwaffe Field Division, and liberating the town of Nevel. On October 15, 3rd Shock was on the northern flank of the salient, attacking the villages of Moseevo and Izocha with the 100th Rifle Brigade and one regiment of 28th Rifle Division. The remainder of that division soon joined the battle, supported on the right by 93rd Corps. The attack was contained, but gained improved positions for later attacks.

=== Pustoshka-Idritsa Offensive ===
Those began on November 2 with the start of the Pustoshka-Idritsa Offensive. 3rd Shock, led by the 21st and 46th Guards Rifle Divisions, smashed through the defenses of 16th Army's Group von Below, then turned the right flank of the 58th Infantry Division. Pivoting northward, the force headed deep into the German rear towards Pustoshka, penetrating more than 30 km deep on a 40 km front by November 7. Army Group North faced an even more dire situation when 6th Guards Army entered the fighting on November 10 in the lake district northeast of Nevel. At about the same time the 165th was moved to the 97th Rifle Corps of this Army, which had been assigned the task of cutting through the long German-held salient that stretched from Novosokolniki nearly as far south as Nevel, although 97th Corps primarily provided protection of the right flank. This attack was repelled and on November 15 the 6th Guards Army was ordered over to the defense, followed by the remainder of 2nd Baltic Front on November 21.

==== Redeployment to 1st Belorussian Front ====
2nd Baltic Front began a new offensive to eliminate the Novosokolniki–Nevel salient on the way to Idritsa on December 16. The attack made almost no headway against the fortified German lines, but by late on December 27 Hitler was convinced the salient was a "useless appendage" and its evacuation was finished by January 8, 1944. On January 20 Colonel Morozov left the division and was officially replaced by Col. Anatolii Akimovich Pilipenko, but Morozov returned to his command within 48 hours. Three days later he handed his command over to Col. Nikolai Ivanovich Kaladze. Morozov moved to the position of chief of staff of 29th Guards Rifle Division, and then to command of 22nd Guards Rifle Division, being promoted to the rank of major general on July 11, 1945. Kaladze had previously commanded the 51st Guards Rifle Division and would lead the division into the postwar.

During January the 165th was reassigned to the 12th Guards Rifle Corps of 6th Guards Army, but on February 5 it returned to the Reserve of the Supreme High Command and began moving south and west, temporarily assigned to 96th Rifle Corps of 21st Army. It returned to the fighting front on March 24, now as part of 77th Rifle Corps of 47th Army in 2nd Belorussian Front, but this Army was moved to 1st Belorussian Front in April and the 165th was reassigned to the 125th Rifle Corps; in May it was shifted to the 129th Rifle Corps.

== Operation Bagration ==
At the start of the summer offensive against Army Group Center on June 22/23 the 129th Corps contained the 260th, 328th, and 165th Divisions and 47th Army was one of five Armies on the western flank of the Front, south of the Pripyat Marshes in the area of Kovel, and so played no role in the initial stages of the offensive.

=== Lublin–Brest Offensive ===
The west wing Armies joined the offensive at 0530 hours on July 18, following a 30-minute artillery preparation. 47th Army's shock group had been shifted to its left flank during July 13–16. Forward detachments of battalion or regimental size attacked and soon determined that the German first and part of the second trench lines had been abandoned, so a further 110-minute preparation was cancelled. The leading Armies (47th, 8th Guards and 69th) reached the second defense zone along the Vyzhuvka River on July 19 and quickly forced a crossing, which led to the zone's collapse by noon, followed by a pursuit of the defeated forces, advancing 20–25 km. On August 9 the 165th would be awarded the Order of the Red Banner for its role in breaking through the German defenses west of Kovel.

On July 20 the leading Armies reached the final defense line along the Western Bug River and began taking crossing points off the march with their mobile units. 47th Army was now being led by the 2nd Guards Cavalry Corps, and by dusk was fighting along a line from outside Zalesie to Grabowo to Zabuzhye after a further advance of 18–26 km. The Front's forces were now in a position to begin the encirclement of the German forces around Brest.

The main forces of the Front's left wing were directed against Lublin on July 21, while 47th Army, along with a mobile group of 2nd Guards Cavalry and 11th Tank Corps, was tasked with reaching Siedlce. By the end of July 23 the Army had reached the line Danze–Podewucze–Pszwloka, following an advance of 52 km in three days. By July 27 it was running into greater resistance, especially in the area of Biała Podlaska and Mendzizec, which blocked the encirclement of part of the Brest grouping. On July 29 Brest was finally encircled and taken, and 129th Corps was redirected to the north from its previous westward advance. The next day it outflanked Siedlce from the northeast and northwest. The city fell on July 31, and the division earned a battle honor:

SIEDLCE – ... 165th Rifle Division (Colonel Kaladze, Nikolai Ivanovich)... The troops that participated in the battles for the liberation of Siedlce and other towns, by order of the Supreme Commander-in-Chief of 31 July 1944 and a commendation in Moscow, are given a salute of 20 artillery salvoes by 224 guns.

By this time, 47th Army was spread across a front of 74 km. Meanwhile, on July 28 the 2nd Tank Army was approaching the Praga suburb of Warsaw, which the STAVKA soon gave orders to be seized, along with bridgeheads over the Vistula River. This Army's attack soon ran into heavy resistance and stalled. The Praga area contained complex and modern fortifications and would prove a hard nut to crack. The German command soon struck with a powerful counterattack of five panzer and one infantry divisions against the boundary of 2nd Tank and 47th Armies in an effort to hold the place, and 2nd Tank was ordered not to attempt to storm the fortifications, but to wait for heavy artillery. In addition, both Armies were suffering severe shortages of fuel and ammunition after the long advance.

== Into Poland and Germany ==
During August the 165th was moved to 70th Army, still in 1st Belorussian Front, where it was assigned to 114th Rifle Corps. It would remain in this Army for the duration of the war. In September it returned to 96th Corps, and it remained under this command for most of the duration. Finally, in October the Army was reassigned to 2nd Belorussian Front and stayed there until after the German surrender.

Prior to the start of the Vistula-Oder Offensive the 70th Army had been substantially reinforced and now contained nine rifle divisions organized in three corps. It was located in the Serock bridgehead with the 96th Corps deployed in a single echelon between Guty and Ciepielin and one division of 47th Rifle Corps also in the front line. The 114th Corps was in the Army's second echelon in the area northeast of Serock. The Army's task was to attack on a 3 km-wide front in the direction of Nasielsk on the first day, outflank Modlin from the north and then drive west to help prevent the German Warsaw grouping from retreating behind the Vistula. The 114th Corps would remain in reserve in the initial phase.

2nd Belorussian Front began its offensive on the morning of January 14, 1945. On January 17 the 70th Army made a fighting advance of up to 14 km against sagging resistance, forced the Wkra and began fighting for the eastern and southeastern outskirts of Modlin. The 114th Corps was now committed from behind the Army's right flank, although one of its divisions remained in second echelon. The following day, after stubborn fighting, the Army secured both the town and fortress. The Front's objective was now to reach the mouth of the Vistula and the Baltic coast, thus cutting off the German forces in East Prussia. On February 19 the 165th would be awarded the Order of Kutuzov, 2nd Degree, in recognition of its part in breaking the German defenses north of Warsaw.

During the last week of January the Army seized a bridgehead over the lower Vistula between Fordon and Chełmno and was fighting to widen it while also blockading the German garrison of Toruń. The latter city was understood to contain 3,000 - 4,000 German troops and one division plus a regiment of the 47th Corps was considered sufficient to contain it on this sector. In fact it contained 30,000 men and on the night of January 30/31 the garrison attempted to break out to the northwest. The 200th Rifle Division, which was in the Army's second echelon on the western bank of the Vistula about 15–20 km west of Kulm, was immediately directed to intercept the escaping grouping and was soon joined by the 165th and three other rifle divisions plus some of the armor of 1st Guards Tank Corps. During the following week nearly all the forces of 70th Army were involved in containing and eventually eliminating this breakout which was completed on February 8; only small groups succeeded in escaping to the west. As a result of this fighting, on February 1 the 751st Rifle Regiment (Colonel Sharapov, Markel Sanzhinovich) was awarded the name "Toruń" as an honorific.

=== East Pomeranian Offensive ===
The next phase of the offensive began on February 10. By this time the 1st Belorussian Front had reached the Oder River and appeared poised to advance on Berlin but the STAVKA was concerned about the potential of German counteroffensive action driving south from Pomerania and ordered the commander of 2nd Belorussian Front, Marshal K. K. Rokossovskii, to complete the isolation of East Prussia and eliminate this flank threat. In a significant regrouping within 70th Army the 165th was moved to 47th Corps.

After a brief halt and a regrouping 70th Army was ordered to resume the offensive on February 22 in the direction of Konarzyny, Reinwasser and Bartin. Later in the month the main objective of 2nd Belorussian Front was the group of German forces in Gdańsk and Gdynia. On March 23, 70th Army, with the help of flanking forces of other armies, broke through the German defenses and captured the town of Sopot and reached the shore of Gdańsk Bay. 96th Corps, to which the 165th had returned, was then directed northwards, towards Kolibken, south of Gdynia. The fighting for that city ended on March 30 and the 608th Artillery Regiment (Lt. Colonel Krivonosov, Aleksandr Yakovlevich), the 199th Antitank Battalion (Major Utkin, Vyacheslav Nikolaevich), and the 305th Signal Battalion (Major Seregov, Leonid Makhailovich) were each given its name as a battle honor. Later, on May 17 the following decorations were awarded to the division's subunits for the same battle:

- 641st Rifle Regiment - Order of the Red Banner
- 562nd Rifle Regiment - Order of Suvorov, 3rd Degree
- 202nd Sapper Battalion - Order of the Red Star

=== The Berlin Operation ===
70th Army was one of the three combined-arms armies in 2nd Belorussian Front that helped form its shock group at the start of the assault on Berlin. At this time the division in common with most others in the Front, had somewhere between 3,600 and 4,800 personnel on strength. The Army was deployed along a 14 km front, but the breakthrough sector was 4 km wide along the West Oder River in the area of Mescherin. The 165th was in the first echelon of 96th Corps with 369th Rifle Division, 38th Guards was in second echelon. 3rd Guards Tank Corps was subordinated to 70th Army for the operation. During April 18–19 the Front launched intensive reconnaissance efforts in preparation for the crossings, including the elimination of German advance parties in the lowlands between the East and West Oder. The division designated a reinforced rifle regiment to this task. Over these two days the Army's first echelon took up positions on the east bank of the West Oder, and at one location had managed to create a small bridgehead on the west bank.

The front's full offensive began on April 20, and during the day units of the 165th seized a bridgehead up to 3 km wide and 500m deep near and to the south of Mescherin. 70th Army continued fighting to cross the West Oder into the night of April 21–22. At 1100 hours on the 22nd it resumed its attack, having beaten off 16 counterattacks, and advanced as much as 2–3 km. By the end of the day 96th Corps had reached the Stettin–Harz highway. By the end of the next day the Corps had advanced as far as Geesow and Hohenreinkendorf, 6 km from the riverbank. The advance continued on April 24, gaining as much as 8 km, and 96th Corps reached Luckow and Petershagen. On the following day 70th Army beat off eight German attacks, captured Penkun, and advanced 15 km, completing the breakthrough of the Oder defensive line, while 96th Corps reached the northern outskirts of Blumberg and Kasekow.

70th Army resumed its offensive on the morning of April 26 and forced a crossing of the Randow River, the German second defensive zone, along its entire front. It then advanced 6–8 km farther. On the following day, with the backing of 3rd Guards Tank Corps, the army advanced flat-out to the west, covering as much as 30 km, and 96th Corps ended the day in the defile between the Sternhagener See and Grosser Potzlowsee. Through the period from April 28 to May 5 the further advance was only opposed by small covering detachments seeking in any way to slow down the offensive. On May 3 contact was made with British Second Army east of Wismar and the next day reached the Baltic in the Warnemunde sector, where the 165th ended the war.

== Postwar ==
The men and women of the division ended the war with the full title 165th Rifle, Siedlce, Order of the Red Banner, Order of Kutuzov Division. (Russian: 165-я стрелковая Седлецкая Краснознамённая ордена Кутузова дивизия.) In a final round of awards on June 4 the following subunits were decorated for their parts in the fighting for Stettin and other nearby towns:

- 562nd Rifle Regiment - Order of Alexander Nevsky
- 751st Rifle Regiment - Order of Suvorov, 3rd Degree
- 608th Artillery Regiment - Order of Alexander Nevsky
- 199th Antitank Battalion - Order of Alexander Nevsky
- 305th Signal Battalion - Order of the Red Star

According to STAVKA Order No. 11095 of May 29, 1945, part 6, the 165th is listed as one of the rifle divisions to be "disbanded in place". It was disbanded accordingly in July.
