= Luzhki, Sharkawshchyna district =

Agrotown in Vitebsk Region, Belarus

Luzhki Лужкі
- Agrotown
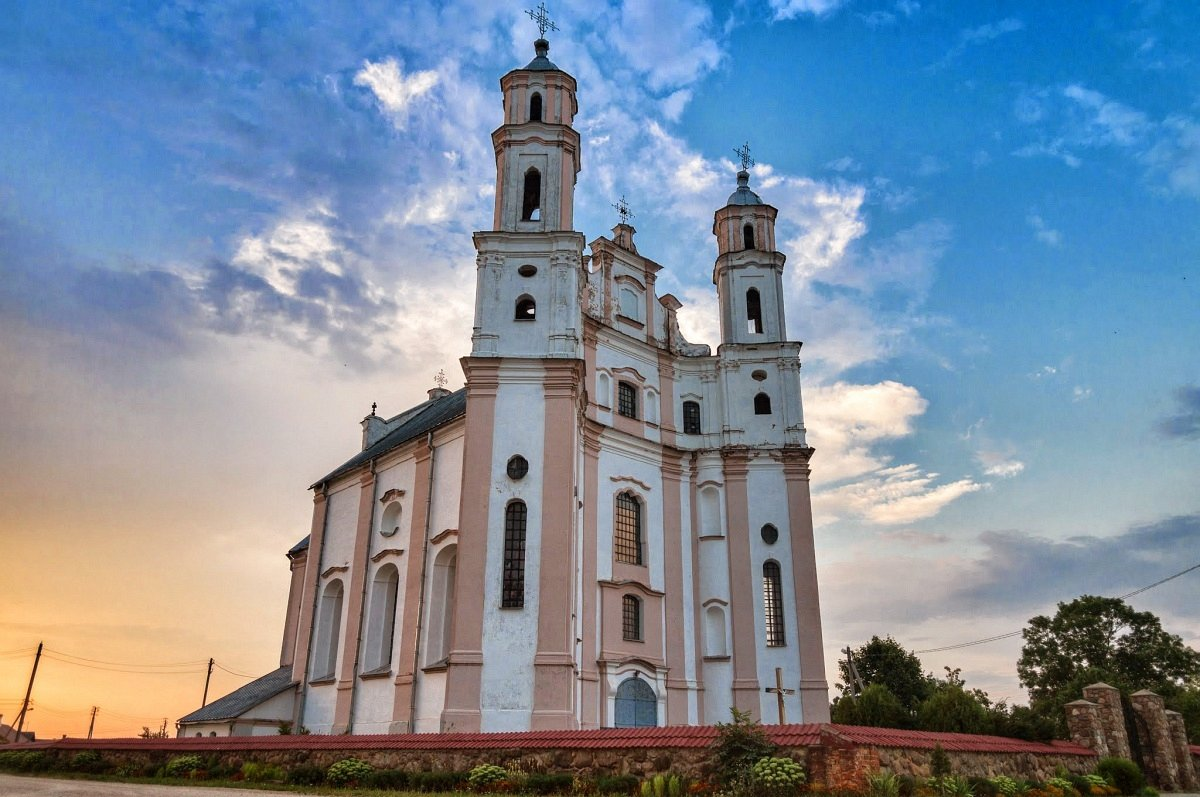
- Church of Saint Michael the Archangel

- Location within Belarus
- Coordinates: 55°21′9″N 27°52′8″E
- Country: Belarus
- Region: Vitebsk Region
- District: Sharkawshchyna District

Population (1999)
  - Total: 905
- Time zone: UTC+3 (MSK)

Luzhki (Belarusian: Лужкі, romanized: Lužki; Russian: Лужки; Polish: Łużki) is an agrotown in Sharkawshchyna District, Vitebsk Region, in northern Belarus. It is located 29 kilometres (18 mi) from Padsvillye, 32 kilometres (20 mi) from Sharkawshchyna, and 198 kilometres (123 mi) from Vitebsk. In 1999, it had a population of 905.

== History ==
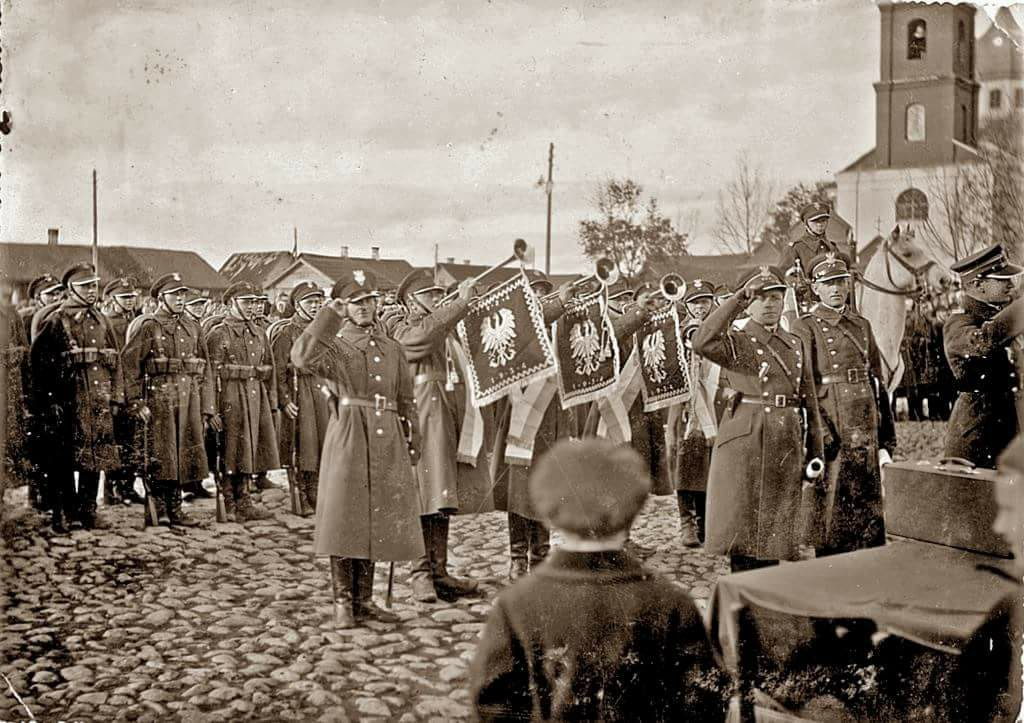
Polish Border Protection Corps in Łużki in the 1930s

Łużki was a former possession of the Sapieha family until Aleksander Sapieha sold it to Walerian Antoni Żaba around 1734. Walerian Antoni Żaba founded a Piarist college and the Baroque Saint Michael church in the settlement. Later on, the town passed to the Plater and Czapski noble families.

In the interbellum, Łużki, as it was known in Polish, was a town administratively located in the Dzisna County in the Wilno Voivodeship of Poland. According to the 1921 Polish census, the population was 49.3% Polish, 25.5% Belarusian and 23.9% Jewish.

Following the invasion of Poland in September 1939, Łużki was first occupied by the Soviet Union until 1941, then by Nazi Germany until 1944, where it was administered as part of Generalbezirk Weißruthenien of Reichskommissariat Ostland. In 1941, a Jewish ghetto was established in the settlement, and Jews were also subjected to forced labour. On 1 June 1942, the ghetto was dissolved and 528 Jews were massacred in a forest near the village. In 1944, the settlement was re-occupied by the Soviet Union, which eventually annexed it from Poland in 1945.

== Notable people ==
- Eliezer Ben-Yehuda (1858–1922), Jewish linguist and lexicographer

== Source ==
- "Лужкі". Беларуская энцыклапедыя: У 18 т. Т. 9: Кулібін — Малаіта / Рэдкал (in Belarusian). Mìnsk: Беларуская энцыклапедыя. 1999. p. 359. ISBN 985-11-0155-9.
- Megargee, Geoffrey P.; Dean, Martin (2012). The United States Holocaust Memorial Museum Encyclopedia of Camps and Ghettos 1933–1945. Volume II. Indiana University Press, United States Holocaust Memorial Museum. p. 1231. ISBN 978-0-253-35599-7.
