= 379th Rifle Division =

- Active: 1941 - 1945
- Country: Soviet Union
- Branch: Red Army
- Type: Division
- Role: Infantry
- Engagements: Battle of Moscow; Battles of Rzhev; Battle of Leningrad; Operation Iskra; Operation Polyarnaya Zvezda; Fifth Sinyavino Offensive; Battle of Nevel (1943); Pskov-Ostrov Offensive; Baltic Offensive; Riga Offensive; Courland Pocket
- Battle honours: Rezekne

Commanders
- Notable commanders: Maj. Gen. Vladimir Afanasevich Chistov; Lt. Col. Ivan Fomich Shcheglov; Col. Nikolai Vasilevich Simonov; Col. Prokopii Kuzmich Boltruchuk; Col. Mikhail Vasilevich Kozlov

The 379th Rifle Division was raised in 1941 as an infantry division of the Red Army, and served for the duration of the Great Patriotic War in that role. It began forming in August 1941 in the Urals Military District. It first served in the winter counteroffensive west of Moscow, and later in the bitter fighting around the Rzhev salient, but was moved north late in 1942. It took up positions along the Volkhov River, mostly under command of the 8th Army, and continued to serve in this Army's battles near Leningrad until September 1943, when it was transferred to the 2nd Baltic Front, where it would stay for the remainder of its service. During this period the division served under many army and corps commands but mostly in the 3rd Shock Army. The division ended the war in Lithuania, helping to contain and reduce the German forces trapped in the Courland Pocket. By this time it was judged as being surplus to the Red Army's needs and in December 1944 its personnel were merged with the 245th Rifle Division to bring that division closer to establishment strength; the latter division also inherited its battle honor. The 379th was officially disbanded on the first day of 1945.

== Formation ==
The 379th began forming in August 1941 in the Urals Military District at Molotov in the Perm Oblast, based on the first wartime shtat (table of organization and equipment) for rifle divisions. Its order of battle was as follows:

- 1253rd Rifle Regiment
- 1255th Rifle Regiment
- 1257th Rifle Regiment
- 934th Artillery Regiment
- 247th Antitank Battalion
- 658th Antiaircraft Battalion (until 15 January 1942); 264th Antiaircraft Battery (15 January 1942 until 14 March 1943)
- 433rd Reconnaissance Company
- 434th Sapper Battalion
- 822nd Signal Battalion (later 822nd Signal Company)
- 456th Medical/Sanitation Battalion
- 449th Chemical Protection (Anti-gas) Company
- 486th Motor Transport Company
- 225th Field Bakery
- 794th Divisional Veterinary Hospital
- 1445th Field Postal Station
- 744th Field Office of the State Bank

The combat path of the 379th Rifle Division

Col. Vladimir Afanasevich Chistov was assigned to command of the division on 1 September, and he would remain in command until 9 September 1942, being promoted to major general on 21 May of that year. As an indication of how short of equipment the District was at this time, it was considered noteworthy that the division managed to pick up 300 brand new PPSh-41 submachine guns and 100 new ZIS-5 3-ton trucks on its way to the front. On 29 November the division was assigned to the 30th Army in Western Front. It was at full strength in manpower, with over 10,000 men. Between 1 and 3 December this Army was preparing to launch its part of the strategic counteroffensive west of Moscow by partially regrouping its forces and carrying out combat reconnaissance. It was also being strengthened with new forces from the Reserve of the Supreme High Command, including the 379th, which disembarked from 2 to 5 December at Taldom and concentrated behind the Army front. The 348th and 371st Rifle Divisions were also reinforcing 30th Army at this time.

== Battle of Moscow ==
The 1st Shock, 20th and 30th Armies all went over to the offensive on the morning of 6 December. The German forces on this sector had been on the defensive for several days and were able to put up stubborn resistance. Attacking along the entire front by the end of the day the troops took the area of Borshchevo and had reached to within 12 to 15km north of Klin. Over the next two days the center and left flank forces of 30th Army continued to advance on Klin and Rogachevo. The German 36th Motorized Division engaged in heavy defensive fighting along a line from Shetakovo to Minino to Berezino with the 379th and 185th Rifle and 82nd Cavalry Divisions. By the morning of 12 December the Army was attacking along its right and left flanks while its center repulsed enemy counterattacks. The division liberated Zavidovo, Spas-Zaulok, and Reshetnikovo; by noon a forward detachment had been formed and given the task of attacking towards Voroshilovskii and cutting off the retreat route of the Germans' Zavidovo group to the west toward Koslovo and Kuryanovo. The next day this enemy grouping, having suffered heavy losses, fell back rapidly along the road to Dorino as the 1st Shock and 30th Armies were completing the encirclement of Klin and the 379th seized Kopylovo. The city was liberated on 15 December. 30th Army continued its pursuit of the Third Panzer Group on 16 December, and was transferred to Kalinin Front at noon.

=== Battles for Rzhev ===
The division remained in 30th Army when it was transferred. Beginning on 8 January 1942, the Army took part in the Sychyovka-Vyasma Offensive Operation, which was planned "to encircle, and then capture or destroy the enemy's entire Mozhaisk - Gzhatsk - Vyasma grouping", that is, what later became known as the Rzhev salient. On 21 January the Front commander, Lt. Gen. I. S. Konev, ordered 30th Army to move from the Front's left flank to its right; this brought it to a position facing south at the north end of the salient, near Rzhev itself, where it would remain for most of the ongoing fighting. By the end of January the successful part of the Soviet counteroffensive had mostly come to an end, in part because most of the rifle regiments had been reduced to 80 - 120 men each.

30th Army began the First Rzhev–Sychyovka Offensive on 30 July with a powerful artillery preparation which, according to Kalinin Front's artillery commander silenced the German artillery, smashed the two forward positions of their main defensive belt and almost completely wiped out the troops occupying them. By the end of the day, despite heavy rain, the Army broke through on a front of 9km to a depth of 6 to 7km. However the assault soon bogged down due to the weather and the savage fighting for the village of Polunino, which was not taken until 21 August. Elements of the 30th reached the outskirts of Rzhev two days later, but could not take the city. On 29 August the Army was reassigned back to Western Front, and the 379th remained with it. During the battles of August and 30 September Army suffered personnel losses of 99,820. On 9 August General Chistov had moved to the post of deputy commanding officer of 30th Army, and the 379th was now under command of Lt. Col. Ivan Fomich Shcheglov.

As of 1 October the division was in the reserves of Western Front. In the first planning document for the upcoming Operation Mars, issued by the Front headquarters on the same date the 379th is identified as one of the divisions that would be assigned to the forces of 20th Army that would attack and seize Sychyovka. In the event the division saw little action in this offensive, losing only 182 killed and 527 wounded from 25 November to the date it left 20th Army. Late in the month it was assigned to 5th Army, still in Western Front. From 29 December – 4 January 1943, the division was in the Reserve of the Supreme High Command.

== Sinyavino Offensives ==
Volkhov and Leningrad Fronts began planning a new offensive to break the German blockade of that city in November 1942. As part of the preparations reinforcements were requested and the STAVKA complied in part by moving five rifle divisions, including the 379th, into Volkhov Front during December/January. The division was assigned to 2nd Shock Army, which formed the Front's shock group. The offensive, which began on 12 January 1943, was known as the Fourth Sinyavino Offensive or Operation Iskra ('Spark') and succeeded in joining up the two Fronts and reestablishing land communications with Leningrad, although Sinyavino itself remained in German hands. Following the success of 'Spark', Marshal G. K. Zhukov ordered a much more ambitious undertaking, Operation Polyarnaya Zvezda. 67th and 2nd Shock Armies joined the assault on 12 February. The assault group of 2nd Shock again struck the defenses of Sinyavino with heavy losses and without success. On 7 March, Lt. Colonel Shcheglov handed his command of the division over to Col. Nikolai Vasilevich Simonov.

By the beginning of April the division had been reassigned, now to the 8th Army. What became the Fifth Sinyavino Offensive began on 22 July. The commander of 8th Army, Lt. Gen. F. N. Starikov, organized two shock groups, each formed in two echelons, to attack north and south of the Mga–Kirishi rail line. The northern group had the 18th and 378th Rifle Divisions in first echelon with the 379th and 239th in the second. The 16th Tank Brigade was also in this echelon, and the 372nd Rifle Division covered the right flank. The shock group faced the bulk of the German 5th Mountain Division astride the rail line. The assault began at 0635 hours and followed six days of artillery preparation against fortified positions. The first echelon troops captured the forward German trenches but then faced stiff resistance including air strikes, antitank guns and mines, and the marshy terrain that bogged down the tanks. With his offensive at a standstill, late in the month Starikov committed the 379th and withdrew the 18th for rest and rebuilding, but this did not improve the situation. Despite last ditch efforts from 11-13 August Starikov's offensive collapsed in exhaustion, still far from Mga.

The sixth and final Sinyavino offensive began on 15 September. The 67th Army's 30th Guards Rifle Corps was assigned to take the village and the nearby heights, which it accomplished in just 30 minutes following an innovative artillery preparation and over 700 air sorties. Meanwhile the 8th Army supported this assault with a drive westward from the Gaitolovo and Voronovo sectors. Starikov formed two shock groups, one of which consisted of the 379th, 372nd and 265th Rifle Divisions and 58th Rifle Brigade, which was to attack at the junction of the German 290th and 254th Infantry Divisions north of the Mga rail line. This part of the offensive made little progress over three days in spite of the explosion of a Soviet mine that pulverized the 254th's Strong Point Olga and wiped out a company. The offensive was shut down on 18 September and the front became relatively quiet for the rest of the year.

== Into Belarus ==
As of October 1 the division was back in the Reserve of the Supreme High Command, now in the 93rd Rifle Corps with the 165th Rifle Division. Within days the Corps was assigned to 3rd Shock Army of Baltic Front (2nd Baltic Front as of 20 October). On October 15, 3rd Shock was on the northern flank of the Nevel salient it had helped create a week earlier, attacking the villages of Moseevo and Izocha with the 100th Rifle Brigade and one regiment of 28th Rifle Division. The remainder of that division soon joined the battle, supported on the right by 93rd Corps. The attack was contained, but gained improved positions for later attacks. Those began on 2 November with the start of the Pustoshka-Idritsa Offensive. 3rd Shock, led by the 21st and 46th Guards Rifle Divisions, smashed through the defenses of 16th Army's Group von Below, then turned the right flank of the 58th Infantry Division. Pivoting northward, the force headed deep into the German rear towards Pustoshka, penetrating more than 30km deep on a 40km front by 7 November.

In support of this offensive the 6th Guards Army, arriving from Ukraine in October, was ordered to move to Nevel on 28 October. In early November the 379th was reassigned to the 97th Rifle Corps of this Army. 6th Guards began its attack on 10 November attempting to cut the long German-held salient from Novosokolniki south nearly to Nevel and link up with 3rd Shock, with 97th Corps covering the right flank. However, German domination of the high ground, powerful defensive positions and difficult terrain and weather prevented any progress and the Army went over to the defensive on 15 November. On 1 December the German 23rd Infantry Division launched a local attack against the overextended 200th Rifle Division of 3rd Shock's 93rd Corps, advancing 3 – 4km, crossing the Ushcha River, and nearly cutting the only supply road to the Soviet forces south of Pustoshka. The 379th and the 18th Guards Rifle Division were dispatched to the threatened sector and placed under control of 90th Rifle Corps. On 5 December the German force briefly seized the heights outside the village of Somino, effectively cutting the road, but were driven off by the two newly-arrived divisions and the 28th Rifle Division attacking from the south. The situation was stabilized by 10 December.

2nd Baltic Front began a new offensive to eliminate the Novosokolniki - Nevel salient on the way to Idritsa on 16 December; in preparation for this the 379th was moved back to the 97th Corps. The attack made almost no headway against the fortified German lines, but by late on 27 December Hitler was convinced the salient was a "useless appendage" and its evacuation was finished by 8 January 1944. In the follow-up to this the division was again reassigned by 1 January to 96th Rifle Corps, still in 6th Guards Army. On 23 January Colonel Simonov handed command of the division to Col. Prokopii Kuzmich Boltruchuk. The division continued to be shuffled about during the following months. On 1 February it was part of the 23rd Guards Rifle Corps, still in 6th Guards; one month later it was in 10th Guards Army (the former 30th Army), back in 93rd Corps as its sole division. As of 1 April it was back in 90th Corps and also back in 3rd Shock Army. It would remain in this Army, mostly as a separate division, until the summer offensive in July.

== Into the Baltic States and Disbandment ==
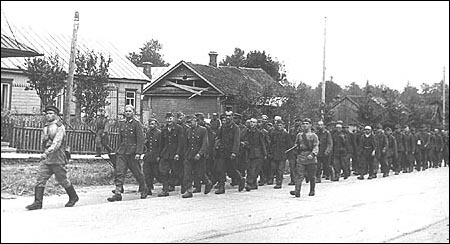
German POWs march through Rezekne, 1944

At the start of the Pskov-Ostrov Offensive the 379th was near Pustoshka, facing the German defenses of the Panther Line. Pushing past these and into the Baltic states the 379th was finally awarded a battle honor for its part in the liberation of Rezekne, Latvia:

"REZEKNE... 379th Rifle Division (Colonel Boltruchuk, Prokopii Kuzmich)... The troops who participated in the liberation of Daugavpils and Rēzekne, by the order of the Supreme High Command of 27 July 1944, and a commendation in Moscow, are given a salute of 20 artillery salvoes from 224 guns.

In a final command change, Col. Mikhail Vasilevich Kozlov took charge of the division on 22 August. By 1 September it was in the 93rd Corps, which had been transferred to the 42nd Army, and was approaching Krustpils by mid-month. As of 1 October, 93rd Corps had been shifted yet again, now to the 22nd Army, and was fighting west of Jaunjelgava as part of the push to seal off Army Group North in the Courland Pocket. Later in October the division was assigned back to 3rd Shock Army, now into the 14th Guards Rifle Corps. The Courland backwater and the fighting there was secondary to the main thrust into Germany and during December the 379th was merged with the 245th Rifle Division, which inherited the Rēzekne battle honor:

... the 245th and 379th rifle divisions, which, upon their arrival are to be reformed into a single rifle division and included within the 59th Army. A directive on the reforming will be issued separately.

The Army and the two divisions were to arrive between 13-30 December in the Lubaczów–Surochów area. The 379th was officially stricken from the Red Army order of battle on 1 January 1945.
