= Boris Vladimirov =

Soviet Army officer

Boris Alexandrovich Vladimirov
- Native name: Борис Александрович Владимиров
- Born: 14 April 1905; Aleksandropol, Aleksandropolsky Uyezd, Erivan Governorate, Russian Empire
- Died: 1 May 1978 (aged 73) Moscow, Soviet Union
- Buried: Vvedenskoye Cemetery
- Allegiance: Soviet Union
- Branch: Red Army (to 1946); Soviet Army (from 1946)
- Service years: 1921–1960
- Rank: Lieutenant general
- Commands: 140th Rifle Brigade; 311th Rifle Division; Rifle Corps
- Conflicts: Russian Civil War; World War II; Lyuban Offensive Operation; Sinyavino Offensive; Leningrad-Novgorod Offensive; Operation Bagration; Baltic Offensive; Vistula-Oder Offensive; East Pomeranian Offensive; Berlin Offensive
- Awards: Hero of the Soviet Union; Order of Lenin (3); Order of the Red Banner (3); Order of Suvorov, 2nd class; Order of the Patriotic War, 1st class; Legion of Merit; Virtuti Militari Silver Cross

Boris Alexandrovich Vladimirov (Russian: Борис Александрович Владимиров; 14 April 1905 – 1 May 1978) was a Soviet Army lieutenant general and a Hero of the Soviet Union. Vladimirov served in the Russian Civil War after being drafted into the Red Army in 1921. He became an officer and by 1941 was a deputy regimental commander. After the German invasion of the Soviet Union, Vladimirov successively became senior officer in charge of the formation of march battalions in the Siberian Military District, chief of staff of a ski brigade, and a rifle brigade. He commanded the rifle brigade in the Siege of Leningrad, during the Lyuban Offensive Operation and the Sinyavino Offensive. Vladimirov took command of the 311th Rifle Division in March 1943, leading it until the end of the war. He was awarded the title Hero of the Soviet Union for his leadership in the Vistula–Oder Offensive. Postwar, Vladimirov became a lieutenant general, commanded a rifle corps, and was deputy chief of staff of the Soviet airborne. He retired in 1960 and lived in Moscow.

== Early life, Russian Civil War, and Interwar period ==
Vladimirov was born on 14 April 1905 in Alexandropol (today Gyumri) in Russian Armenia to the family of a civil servant. He was drafted into the Red Army in June 1921 and fought in the Russian Civil War. In 1925, Vladimirov graduated from infantry school. He became a machine gunner, machine-gun platoon commander, and machine-gun company commander, and led a separate reconnaissance battalion in Cheremkhovo. In 1937, he became a senior teacher of tactics at the reserve officers' advanced training courses in Tomsk. By June 1941 Vladimirov was deputy commander of the 365th Rifle Regiment of the 119th Rifle Division in Krasnoyarsk.

== World War II ==
After the German invasion of the Soviet Union, Vladimirov became senior officer for the formation of march battalions in the Siberian Military District during July. In August, he took command of the 143rd Reserve Ski Brigade at Krasnoyarsk. In December, Vladimirov was appointed commander of the 140th Separate Rifle Brigade, forming at Klyukvenny. The brigade was sent to the front with Vladimirov commanding during February 1942. The brigade became part of the 54th Army and then the 8th Army. It fought in the Lyuban Offensive and Sinyavino Offensive, suffering heavy losses in both failed attempts to break the Siege of Leningrad. Vladimirov was wounded in May 1942.

In 1943, Vladimirov became a Communist Party of the Soviet Union member. In March 1943, he took command of the 311th Rifle Division, fighting on the Volkhov Front. The division fought in the Mga Offensive. On 10 November, Vladimirov was awarded the Order of the Red Banner. The division fought in the Novgorod–Luga Offensive of the Leningrad–Novgorod Offensive from January 1944. On 20 May, Vladimirov was awarded the Order of the Patriotic War, 1st class. From June, the division fought on the 2nd Baltic Front. During Operation Bagration, Vladimirov led the division in the Polotsk Offensive. The division then fought in the Rezhitsa–Dvinsk Offensive and the Baltic Offensive. On 2 November 1944 he was promoted to major general. Vladimirov was awarded a second Order of the Red Banner on 3 November. In December, the division became part of the 1st Belorussian Front.

The division fought in the Vistula–Oder Offensive in January 1945. The division broke through German defenses on the Vistula between 14 and 15 January. Pursuing retreating German troops between 16 and 28 January, the division advanced 400 kilometers. The division captured Schneidemuhl, where they found 30 trains loaded with food and military equipment. On 6 April Vladimirov was awarded the title Hero of the Soviet Union and the Order of Lenin for his leadership. After the offensive, the division continued its advance in the East Pomeranian Offensive and the Berlin Offensive, fighting until the end of the war. On 29 May 1945, Vladimirov was awarded the Order of Suvorov 2nd class.

== Postwar ==
Vladimirov was awarded his second Order of Lenin in November 1945. In 1947, he graduated from Higher Academic Courses at the Higher Military Academy. On 15 November 1950, Vladimirov was awarded a third Order of the Red Banner. He commanded a rifle corps and was deputy chief of staff of the Soviet airborne forces. On 8 August 1955, Vladimirov was promoted to the rank of lieutenant general. He retired in 1960 and lived in Moscow. Vladimirov died on 1 May 1978 and was buried in the Vvedenskoye Cemetery. In 2010, Vladimirov's memoirs were posthumously published by Yauza/Eksmo as Divisional Commander: From Sinyavino Heights to the Elbe (Russian: Комдив. От Синявинских высот до Эльбы).
