= 311th Rifle Division =

311th Rifle Division (July 14, 1941 – May 29, 1945)
- Maj. Gen. B. A. Vladimirov, Hero of the Soviet Union
- Active: 1941–1945
- Country: Soviet Union
- Branch: Red Army
- Type: Infantry
- Size: Division
- Engagements: Siege of Leningrad; Lyuban Offensive Operation; Operation Polyarnaya Zvezda; Novgorod–Luga Offensive; Baltic Offensive; Vistula-Oder Offensive; East Pomeranian Offensive; Berlin Strategic Offensive
- Decorations: Order of the Red Banner; Order of Suvorov
- Battle honours: Dvinsk

Commanders
- Notable commanders: Col. Ivan Semyonovich Gogunov; Maj. Gen. Fyodor Nazarovich Parkhomenko; Col. Sergei Timofeevich Biyakov; Col. Vasilii Ivanovich Zolotarev; Col. Teodor-Verner Andreevich Sviklin; Col. Fyodor Izotovich Andreev; Maj. Gen. Boris Aleksandrovich Vladimirov

The 311th Rifle Division was a standard Red Army rifle division formed on July 14, 1941 at Kirov before being sent to the vicinity of Leningrad, where it spent most of the war, sharing a similar combat path with its "sister", the 310th Rifle Division. The men and women of the division were fully engaged in the struggle for Leningrad until early 1944, fighting in several offensives to drive a lifeline through the German positions to the besieged city, and then to finally drive the besiegers away. When this was accomplished, the division was redeployed to take the fight into the Baltic States in 1944, then into the German heartland in the winter and spring of 1945. It ended the war north of Berlin after compiling a very distinguished record of service.

== Formation ==
The 311th began forming in mid-July, 1941 at the city of Kirov in the Urals Military District. Its order of battle was as follows:

- 1067th Rifle Regiment
- 1069th Rifle Regiment
- 1071st Rifle Regiment
- 855th Artillery Regiment
- 371st Antitank Battalion
- 595th Sapper Battalion

The first commander assigned was Col. Ivan Semyonovich Gogunov on July 14, but he was replaced by Col. Timofei Semyonovich Orlenko on August 22. The division was given about six weeks to assemble before it was moved by rail all the way to the area east of Leningrad in August – September. It was first assigned to the 48th Army. That army's defenses were pierced by the German XXXIX Motorized Corps in late August, forcing the 48th to withdraw and abandon the key railroad station at Mga. Marshal Kliment Voroshilov ordered that Mga be retaken by September 6 at all costs. The 311th, along with the 128th Rifle Division, 1st Mountain Rifle Brigade, and an NKVD division of border guards, drove the German forces from Mga on August 30, but it was lost again the following day.

== Battle of Leningrad ==
German forces cut off and isolated Leningrad on September 8. Two days later, the 311th was re-assigned to the 4th Army, still in Leningrad Front but outside the encirclement. Maj. Gen. Fyodor Nazarovich Parkhomenko took command of the division on September 17, which he would hold until the end of November. On October 16, XXXIX Motorized Corps and I Army Corps crossed the Volkhov River in a new offensive towards Tikhvin, which was intended to deepen the encirclement of Leningrad and to link up with the Finnish Army. The assaulting forces penetrated the 4th Army's fragile defenses in four days of heavy fighting in roadless terrain covered by 9 – 10 cm of snow. While the army's 292nd Rifle Division was shattered, and other elements forced back eastwards, the 311th and 285th Rifle Divisions on the right flank halted the German 11th Infantry Division north of Kirishi on October 24.

On November 8 Tikhvin fell, while another German thrust towards Volkhov was slowly forcing four rifle divisions back towards that city, driving a wedge between the 4th and 54th Armies. It was at this time that the 311th began operating alongside its "sister" 310th Rifle Division. Army Group North ordered its 8th Panzer Division to support the advance but a desperate counterattack by the 310th at Zelenets Station thwarted the outflanking attempt east of the town. By this time the German offensive was stalled due to losses, overextension, Soviet resistance and severe winter weather. Volkhov was held, and by late November the Red Army went over to the counteroffensive. 4th Army formed three shock groups; the Northern Group, which included the 1067th Rifle Regiment, was to attack Tikhvin from the north. The main forces of the 311th remained west of Volkhov, attached to 54th Army. On November 26 that army's main shock group (3rd Guards, 310th and 311th Rifle Divisions, plus 6th Naval Infantry Brigade) attacked the I Army Corps' 21st Infantry Division south of Volkhov, driving it back several kilometres south of the town by the 29th. Several days later, 54th Army was reinforced, and a new shock group, which included the 311th, under its new commander, Col. Sergei Timofeevich Biyakov, attacked on December 3, successively encircling and destroying several companies of the 254th Infantry Division. I Army Corps attempted to hold the vital rail line from Mga to Kirishi, but by mid-month the 311th and its companions had cut it, forming a small salient to the west of Kirishi. At this point the attack ran out of steam, and German reinforcements ensured that the Kirishi area would remain in German hands until early October, 1943.

=== Operation Pole Star ===
On April 28, Col. Vasilii Ivanovich Zolotarev took command, which he would hold until December. Months of heavy combat had worn the division down, and on May 2 it was noted that 54th Army was "rehabilitating" it in preparation for an operation to try to help rescue the nearly-encircled 2nd Shock Army in the Lyuban region. As part of Operation Pole Star in February, 1943, the 311th, along with three other rifle divisions, three rifle brigades, and a tank brigade, attacked the defenses of the German 96th Infantry Division in the sector south of Smerdynia. Despite employing overwhelming force, the shock group penetrated only 3 – 4 km into the enemy defenses along a 5 km front in three days of heavy fighting. German reinforcements from other sectors brought the attack to a standstill, and Operation Pole Star was not a success. In March, Colonel (later Major General) Boris Aleksandrovich Vladimirov took command of the division, which he led until the end of the war.

Towards the end of the Fifth Siniavino Offensive in August the 311th and the 503rd Separate Tank Battalion were the last reserves of Volkhov Front. On August 13 they were thrown into the bloody melee along the Naziia River in the area of Poreche. In one final desperate attempt to crack the German defenses the division, with armor support, fought a see-saw battle, mostly against the 132nd Infantry Division, until both sides were exhausted. On August 22 the STAVKA ordered Volkhov Front over to the defense. A further effort, the Sixth Siniavino Offensive, began in September. The 311th, which was now in 6th Rifle Corps of 8th Army, was in a shock group with three other rifle divisions, set to attack the defenses of the much-reduced 5th Mountain Division from the rail line to Mga south to Voronovo. While this offensive finally liberated Siniavino, 8th Army made few gains in three days of heavy fighting, and this effort was soon shut down. Later in September the division was back in 54th Army, where it remained until November. In that month it was transferred to 21st Army, where it remained in the Reserve of the Supreme High Command, in 99th Rifle Corps, until January, 1944.

== Novgorod Offensive ==
In late 1943, the Leningrad, Volkhov and 2nd Baltic Fronts began planning the operations that would finally drive the besiegers away from Leningrad and, if all went well, destroy one or both of the armies of German Army Group North. The assault began on January 14, 1944. At this time the 311th was in the 8th Army in Volkhov Front, still in 99th Corps. As the offensive continued, the Volkhov Front was dissolved on February 13, and the division was reassigned to the Leningrad Front, still in 99th Corps which was now assigned to the 54th Army.

== Baltic Offensive ==
In the spring of 1944, 54th Army was in the new 3rd Baltic Front, and the 311th was moved to the 7th Rifle Corps for a couple of months. In June the division was reassigned to the 14th Rifle Corps, which moved to the 4th Shock Army in July. In the second week of July it was in the vicinity of Sharkovshchina, advancing into the so-called "Baltic Gap" between German Army Groups Center and North. On July 27 the 311th was recognized for its role in the liberation of Dvinsk in Latvia, and granted the name of that city as an honorific:

"DVINSK"...311 Rifle Division (Colonel Vladimirov, Boris Aleksandovich)... the troops who participated in the battles with the enemy, and the liberation of Dvinsk, by the order of the Supreme High Command of 27 July 1944, and a commendation in Moscow, is given a salute of 20 artillery salvos from 224 guns.

As the offensive continued in early September, the division fought its way further west, to the vicinity of Biržai, southeast of Riga.

== Advance ==
In October, the division was transferred to the 60th Rifle Corps, still in the 4th Shock Army; then that corps was shifted to the 61st Army, still in the same Front until December, when that army was moved to the 1st Belorussian Front. At about the same time, the 311th joined the 89th Rifle Corps, still in the 61st Army, and it would remain in that Front, army and corps until it was disbanded. On October 22 the division was recognized with the award of the Order of Suvorov, 2nd Class.

General Vladimirov distinguished himself in the first stages of the Vistula-Oder Offensive. As a result of a well thought-out and skillfully organized battle plan the 311th successfully broke through the deep defenses of the German forces at the Magnuszev bridgehead over the Vistula river. In pursuit of the enemy, from January 16 to 28 the division advanced about 400 km against scattered resistance, with minor losses in manpower and materiel. Vladimirov's troops were among the first to enter the main territory of Nazi Germany (west of East Prussia) and took the city of Schneidemuhl on February 14. In the process, the division captured a large number of trophies, including 30 trains loaded with food and military equipment. In recognition of this:

"For exemplary performance of his command assignments at the front of the struggle against the German invaders, and for displaying courage and heroism, by the Decree of the Presidium of the Supreme Soviet of the USSR of April 6, 1945, Major General Vladimirov, Boris Aleksandrovich, is awarded the title Hero of the Soviet Union.

On April 26 the division was awarded the Order of the Red Banner for its role in the defeat of German forces around Stargard. When hostilities ceased, the division carried the official title of 311th Rifle, Dvinsk, Order of the Red Banner, Order of Suvorov Division. (Russian: 311-я стрелковая Двинская Краснознамённая ордена Суворова дивизия.)

== Postwar ==
According to STAVKA Order No. 11095 of May 29, 1945, part 6, the 311th is listed as one of the rifle divisions to be "disbanded in place". It was disbanded in Germany in accordance with the directive during the summer of 1945.
