= 46th Guards Rifle Division =

46th Guards Rifle Division (October 10, 1942 – July 1945)
- Active: 1942–1945
- Country: Soviet Union
- Branch: Red Army
- Type: Division
- Role: Infantry
- Engagements: Battle of Velikiye Luki; Battle of Nevel (1943); Pustoshka-Idritsa Offensive; Operation Bagration; Baltic Offensive; Šiauliai Offensive; Riga Offensive (1944); Courland Pocket
- Decorations: Order of the Red Banner

Commanders
- Notable commanders: Maj. Gen. Sergei Isaevich Karapetyan; Maj. Gen. Ivan Mikhailovich Nekrasov; Col. Kuzma Andreevich Vasilev; Maj. Gen. Valerii Ivanovich Savchuk

The 46th Guards Rifle Division was formed as an elite infantry division of the Red Army in October 1942, based on the 2nd formation of the 174th Rifle Division, and served in that role until after the end of the Great Patriotic War. It was in the 6th Army of Voronezh Front when it won its Guards title, but was immediately moved to the Reserve of the Supreme High Command for rebuilding, where it was soon assigned to the 5th Guards Rifle Corps. In mid-November it moved with its Corps to join the 3rd Shock Army in Kalinin Front and played a leading role in the Battle of Velikiye Luki, both in the encirclement of the German garrison of that city and then in fighting off several relief attempts. It remained in the area through the spring and summer of 1943 before taking part in the breakthrough battle at Nevel and the subsequent operations to expand the salient and pinch off the German positions that 3rd Shock had partly surrounded. In June 1944 the 46th Guards was reassigned to the 6th Guards Army of 1st Baltic Front in preparation for Operation Bagration and made a spectacular advance into Lithuania through the "Baltic Gap" between Army Groups Center and North. The division would continue to serve in the Baltic states in 6th Guards for the duration of the war, winning the Order of the Red Banner in the process and ending on the Baltic coast in 22nd Guards Rifle Corps helping to contain the German forces trapped in the Courland Pocket. Despite a creditable record of service the division was disbanded shortly after the end of hostilities.

== Formation ==
The 46th Guards officially received its Guards title on October 10. Due to the circumstances of wartime it would not receive its banner and its subunits would not be redesignated until February 27, 1943; therefore they fought under their previous designations throughout the Battle of Velikiye Luki. After the subunits finally received their designations the division's order of battle was as follows:

- 135th Guards Rifle Regiment (from 494th Rifle Regiment)
- 139th Guards Rifle Regiment (from 508th Rifle Regiment)
- 141st Guards Rifle Regiment (from 628th Rifle Regiment)
- 97th Guards Artillery Regiment (from 598th Artillery Regiment)
- 51st Guards Antitank Battalion
- 238th Antiaircraft Battery (disbanded February 27, 1943)
- 42nd Guards Reconnaissance Company (from 112th Reconnaissance Company)
- 50th Guards Sapper Battalion (from 202nd Sapper Battalion)
- 68th Guards Signal Battalion (from 653rd Signal Battalion)
- 49th Guards Medical/Sanitation Battalion
- 48th Guards Chemical Defense (Anti-gas) Company
- 47th Guards Motor Transport Company
- 52nd Guards Field Bakery
- 45th Guards Divisional Veterinary Hospital
- 1526th Field Postal Station
- 1416th Field Office of the State Bank

Maj. Gen. Sergei Isaevich Karapetyan remained in command of the division after its redesignation. On October 12 it was moved to the Reserve of the Supreme High Command, where by the start of November it was assigned to the newly-formed 5th Guards Rifle Corps, initially as its only division, and at the disposal of the General Staff. Later that month it was joined by the 9th Guards and 357th Rifle Divisions. At this time the personnel of the 46th Guards were noted as being 70 percent fully equipped; more than half had combat experience and one in four was a Communist Party member or a Komsomol.

== Battle of Velikiye Luki ==
On October 13 Kalinin Front had received orders that several formations would be transferred to its command in the buildup to the forthcoming Operation Mars. Among these was the 5th Guards Corps to reinforce 43rd Army. Just as it was arriving at Toropets Maj. Gen. A. P. Beloborodov was moved from 9th Guards Division and given command of the Corps. As plans for the winter offensive changed the 5th Guards Corps was soon sent to reinforce 3rd Shock Army, which launched an offensive to retake Velikiye Luki and Novosokolniki on November 25.

The Corps was to take the leading role in the offensive. After forcing a crossing of the Lovat River and bypassing Velikiye Luki to the southwest, its objective was to cut the rail lines from Velikiye Luki to Nevel and Velikiye Luki to Novosokolniki, and to link up with other forces of 3rd Shock advancing from the northeast to encircle the city. The 357th Division was to then storm the city from the west while the 9th Guards continued the advance on Novosokolniki. 46th Guards, on the left flank, was to cover the other two divisions against counterattacks from Nevel along a broad front. On the eve of the offensive, forward detachments of all three divisions crossed the Lovat, suppressed the German advanced positions along the west bank, and then advanced to their main line along the Nevel railway; this reconnaissance-in-force both revealed much of the enemy fire plan and put artillery observers in position to direct fire against it in the opening preparation. Altogether, with its own assets and the divisional and regimental artillery, the Corps had about 45 barrels per kilometre on the breakthrough front. The Lovat is not wide (25 to 60 metres) but has a fast current, steep banks, and few good approaches.

The night of November 24 was foggy, which hindered German illumination flares as the Soviet forward detachments crossed the river and entered no-mans-land and the German advanced posts fell back to their main position. By 0800 hours on November 25 the Corps had seized a bridgehead of about 14 square kilometres, and the 494th Guards Regiment captured the villages of Skorotovo, Feshkovo, and Obzho. However, the supporting tanks had fallen behind during the night approach. The fog lifted after 1000 hrs., allowing the 30-minute artillery preparation to begin. The infantry attack began at 1100 hrs., but developed slowly because the enemy fire system could not be fully suppressed. The next morning the general offensive by 3rd Shock began with a 90-minute artillery preparation. The division soon crossed the Nevel railway on a 1,000m front north of Chernozem Station on the left flank of 9th Guards, and General Karapetyan reported that German resistance was much weaker there than on other sectors. He had already ordered his 508th Guards Regiment to exploit and had thrown in his reserves; the Regiment rushed forward 2km and continued to advance.

During November 26 the 508th Regiment pressed forward another 3km to the village of Gromovo, and General Beloborodov ordered the 18th Guards Rifle Regiment of the 9th Guards to move into the gap and cut the road and railway between Novosokolniki and Velikiye Luki. In the evening the 46th Guards met the first German counterattacks by infantry and tanks and dug in to hold the area it had occupied. Overnight several prisoners taken by scouts of 9th Guards revealed that the 138th Regiment of 3rd Mountain Division had moved up from Novosokolniki to attack at the junction of the flanks of the two Guards divisions, while advance elements of 20th Motorized Division, from Nevel, were now facing the 46th Guards. On November 28 the 9th Guards and 357th Divisions joined up with the 381st Rifle Division attacking from the north to complete the inner and outer encirclements of the city; meanwhile the 46th Guards, as well as the 21st Guards and 28th Rifle Divisions on its left flank, noted that the German 291st Infantry Division had joined the relief force.

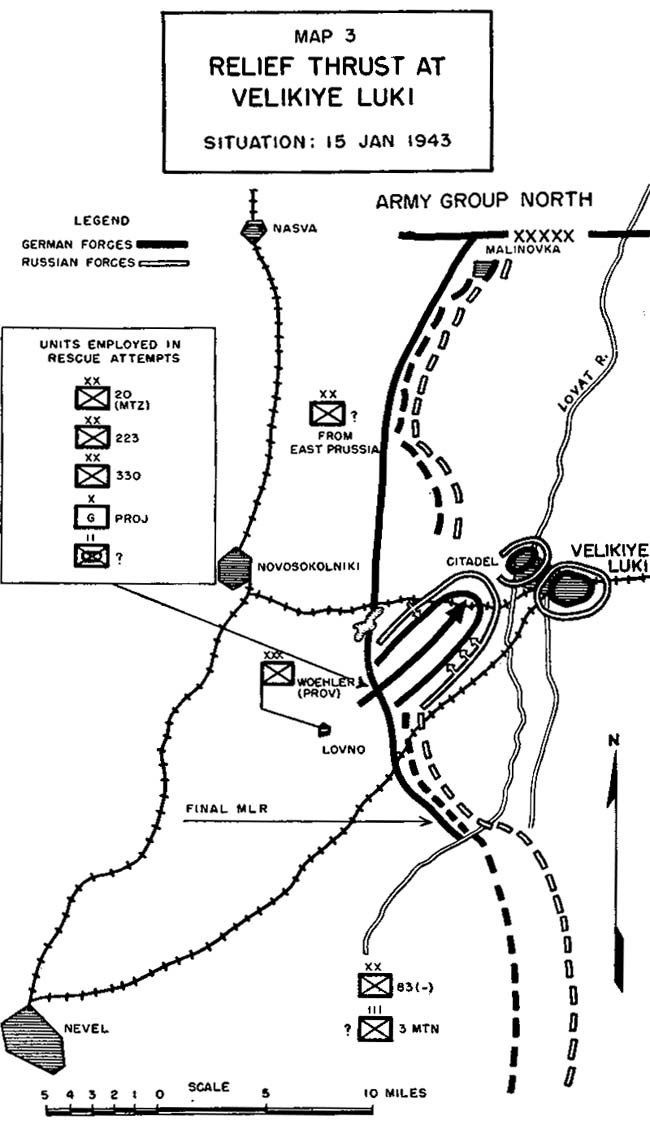
German relief attempts during the battle. (Notice that the order of battle given on this 1952 map is not accurate.)

In the face of this threat the division adopted an offensive/defensive stance. Karapetyan proposed to Corps headquarters a plan to send demolition groups into the German rear under cover of darkness, and Beloborodov approved. The sappers set off towards Nevel and blew up the railway at several points, including a 600m section. The 9th Guards in a similar operation destroyed a reinforced concrete railway bridge near Novosokolniki. These proved important in delaying German reinforcements due to the lack of roads in the region. On the evening of December 2 the 9th Guards and 357th were preparing to liquidate the forces of the German 83rd Infantry Division that were surrounded at Shelkovo and Shiripino. Shortly before the artillery preparation began Beloborodov was informed that the German relief force had launched a strong attack on the 508th Guards Regiment, which was fighting hard. As he drove towards Karapetyan's headquarters he was stopped by a lieutenant who informed the Corps commander that German troops had broken through and were approaching the village of Brukhny. Karapetyan reported that the Regiment's 2nd Battalion was encircled at Torchilikha, the 3rd Battalion was falling back towards the railway, and that he was preparing a counterattack with his reserves. Elements of the relief force managed to join up with the Shiripino grouping overnight but were unable to proceed further due to Soviet counterattacks. Before dawn the 9th Guards and 357th began their planned attack and by the morning of December 4 organized resistance in the Shiripino pocket had ceased, with just small groups of the 83rd Infantry and the relief force escaping to the south.

A second relief attempt began on December 5, driving into the center of 5th Guards Corps until by December 10 the relieving force held a salient with its eastern tip between 13-20km from the Velikiye Luki garrison. It attempted to renew its push on December 11 but by now the Corps had been reinforced with the 19th Guards Rifle Division. On the 14th the 291st Infantry managed to retake Gromovo but was forced out again the next day by the 9th Guards. During most of this period the front facing the 46th Guards was relatively quiet and by the 16th a lull fell over the battlefield as the LIX Army Corps paused to regroup. This was completed by December 19 when a third effort began with an artillery preparation and attack that mostly hit the 9th and 19th Guards. The 46th Guards reported at 1700 hours that the German forces it faced had remained inactive while the 9th Guards limited the advance to 900m at the most. The attacks went on until December 24 when the relief force went over to the defensive. The final relief attempt began on January 4, 1943 and despite the earlier arrival of the 360th Rifle Division and 100th Rifle Brigade, Beloborodov was compelled to also reinforce his defense with two regiments of the 46th Guards, one to the 9th Guards and one to the 360th. The next day elements of LIX Corps wedged forward to within 1,000m of the Velikiye Luki-Novosokolniki road but on January 6, despite the commitment of the 331st Infantry and 707th Security Divisions, the German force was held. It made no further progress through to January 12 when it suspended its attacks due to exhaustion about 3km from the city.

=== Battle for Ptahinskaya Height ===
The German garrison of Velikiye Luki surrendered on January 17; about 4,000 were taken prisoner. The day previous the 5th Guards Corps had begun an offensive to eliminate the wedge into its lines produced by the relief operations. Its goal was to encircle and eliminate at least part of the salient but in the early going the 46th and 9th Guards, reinforced by the 45th Ski and 184th Tank Brigades, were held by numerous counterattacks. Finally on February 5 the wedge was retaken and the Corps went over to the defense, generally along the lines it had held in late November. The spring rasputitsa brought any significant fighting to a halt until late April. At 1400 hours on May 5 Beloborodov's headquarters began receiving reports that "the enemy is moving away". The next morning the Corps advanced 4–4.5km along its entire front and reached the line of Suragino, Izosimovo, Korin, Berezovo, Ostrovka and Ptakhino. This was a ridge of heights overlooking swampy lowlands and had been prepared for defense well in advance.

The 46th Guards immediately found itself in difficulty due to enfilade fire from a German strongpoint on Ptahinskaya height, named for the nearby village. The first attacks by Lt. Col. P. S. Romanenko's 141st Guards Rifle Regiment (former 628th) were unsuccessful despite extensive artillery and air support. After demands from the Front commander, General Beloborodov in turn demanded to know what Karapetyan and his staff proposed to do to seize the height, to which he replied: "We think, Afanasii Pavlantievich. We sit together with Romanenko in front of this Ptahinskaya height and think ..." At 0300 hours on June 23 Karapetyan reported to Beloborodov the surprising news that the height had been taken. After extensive study of the situation Romanenko had formed an assault group of 115 men that stormed the position in darkness at bayonet point. German counterattacks by the 291st Division and 1st SS Infantry Brigade, supported by heavy artillery, began early on June 24 and continued until July 6 with a final effort that included a battalion from a German Army officer school backed by 10 tanks. Soviet sources state that the counterattacks cost the German forces over 3,000 casualties without success. Through the next three months the division engaged in combat training on a quiet front.

== Battle of Nevel ==
As of October 1 the 5th Guards Rifle Corps had been reassigned to 39th Army, and the 46th Guards remained as a separate division in 3rd Shock Army with a personnel strength of roughly 5,500 men. In the deployment for the Nevel operation the Army commander, Lt. Gen. K. N. Galitskii, concentrated his rifle divisions and brigades on a 4km-wide penetration sector, supported by all 54 of the Army's tanks and 814 of its guns and mortars. The division formed part of the Army reserve along with the 31st and 100th Rifle Brigades. Galitskii planned to precede his main attack with a reconnaissance-in-force beginning at 0500 hours on October 6. The Army faced the German XXXXIII Army Corps of three divisions, including the 83rd Infantry which it had defeated previously at Velikiye Luki, and part of II Luftwaffe Field Corps. The boundary between the two German corps also marked the boundary between Army Groups North and Center.

The reconnaissance was followed by a 90-minute artillery preparation at 0840 hours and air attacks. The 28th Rifle Division spearheaded the attack at the army group boundary and almost immediately routed the 2nd Luftwaffe Field Division while the 263rd Infantry Division was also badly damaged. By noon it had cleared the first German defensive position and was followed by the 54 vehicles of the 78th Tank Brigade carrying a regiment of the 21st Guards Division which tore deep into the German positions and seized Nevel off the march by the end of the day following an advance of more than 20km. Meanwhile the 28th Division shifted its advance northwards and joined the 46th Guards in an advance south of Lake Iban in the direction of Bykovo on the Nevel-Dno railway. Despite these spectacular early successes the German high command quickly assembled reserves to contain the advance while being unable to regain any lost ground. According to Soviet sources the Nevel operation ended on October 10 but local battles for position continued until October 18.

=== Pustoshka Offensive ===
On October 20 the Kalinin Front was renamed 1st Baltic and soon came under command of Army Gen. M. M. Popov. In an early morning fog on November 2 the 3rd and 4th Shock Armies penetrated the defenses of the left flank of 3rd Panzer Army southwest of Nevel. After the breakthrough, which opened a 16km-wide gap, 3rd Shock turned to the north behind the flank of 16th Army while 4th Shock moved southwest behind 3rd Panzer Army. 3rd Shock headed deep into the German rear area towards its objective, the town of Pustoshka on the Velikiye Luki-Riga railroad line. By November 7 the Army's lead elements had penetrated more than 30km deep on a 40km front. Later that month 3rd Shock made several futile efforts to break through the German defenses east of Pustoshka but made only minimal gains and on November 21 General Popov ordered his entire Front over to the defensive. At about this time the 46th Guards was assigned to the 100th Rifle Corps.

1st Baltic planned a new offensive to clear the German-held salient south of Novosokolniki in early January 1944. However this was preempted beginning on December 29 when Army Group North began a phased withdrawal which took place over six days. This caught the Soviets by surprise and while 3rd Shock and 6th Guards Army to the east hastily organized a pursuit this did nothing but harass the retreating Germans. In January the 100th Rifle Corps, now consisting of the 46th Guards and 28th Rifle Divisions, was transferred to the 10th Guards Army in 2nd Baltic Front.

== Operation Bagration ==
On February 7 General Karapetyan handed his command to Maj. Gen. Ivan Mikhailovich Nekrasov; the former would soon take command of the 146th Rifle Division while the latter had been made a Hero of the Soviet Union for his leadership in the Yelnya Offensive in 1941. During that month the division was reassigned to the 7th Guards Rifle Corps, still in 10th Guards Army. About a month later it returned to 3rd Shock Army, now in the 90th Rifle Corps. During April it was moved again, now to the 79th Rifle Corps, still in 3rd Shock. On May 15 Nekrasov was replaced in command by Col. Kuzma Andreevich Vasilev. Finally, in preparation for the summer offensive, the 46th Guards joined the 9th Guards and 166th Rifle Divisions in the 2nd Guards Rifle Corps of 6th Guards Army, back in 1st Baltic Front.

In the three nights before the Soviet summer offensive the 6th Guards made an approach march of 110km to a new sector of 1st Baltic Front 30km wide that had been vacated by 43rd Army to the south. This move was not noticed by the German command until the battle began on June 22. 2nd Guards Corps was in the Army's second echelon and even on the second and third days was struggling to keep up with the lead elements which had reached the Western Dvina River but not yet broken through the German defenses there. This was left to 2nd Guards Corps on June 25 which forced a crossing at Beshankovichy with support from the 3rd Air Army, followed by the 1st Rifle Corps of 43rd Army. By June 28 there were two large gaps to the north and south of the retreating German IX Army Corps and the 6th Guards was pushing into both. The previous night the 2nd Guards Corps and 1st Tank Corps had attacked the 252nd Infantry Division and only 300 of its men had managed to escape. By the afternoon of June 29 the remnants of IX Corps were holding a small semi-circle about 75km southwest of Polotsk with a gap over 50km wide stretching to its north, giving 6th Guards Army free rein to advance towards the Baltic states.

== Baltic Offensives ==
As of July 8 the 46th Guards was located just west of Polotsk, while most of its Army had advanced as far as Sharkawshchyna. By August 1 the division had caught up with 6th Guards Army and had crossed the border into Lithuania, into the vicinity of Rokiškis. By the second week of September it was under command of 4th Shock Army in the area of Biržai. In early October the division returned to 6th Guards Army and was advancing north of Šiauliai towards the Latvian capital. For its part in the liberation of Riga, on October 22 the 46th Guards was awarded the Order of the Red Banner. Since September it had been subordinated to the 22nd Guards Rifle Corps, The division remained in Latvia for the duration of the war helping to contain and reduce the former Army Group North in the Courland peninsula. Maj. Gen. Valerii Ivanovich Savchuk took command of the division from Colonel Vasilev on November 23 and remained in this post for the duration. In February 1945 the 46th Guards returned to 10th Guards Army with the 22nd Guards Corps but a month later it and the Corps was back in 6th Guards Army, now in Leningrad Front as part of the Kurland Group of Forces. The division was disbanded in July.
