= Mga offensive =

Military operation

- Part of the Eastern Front of World War II
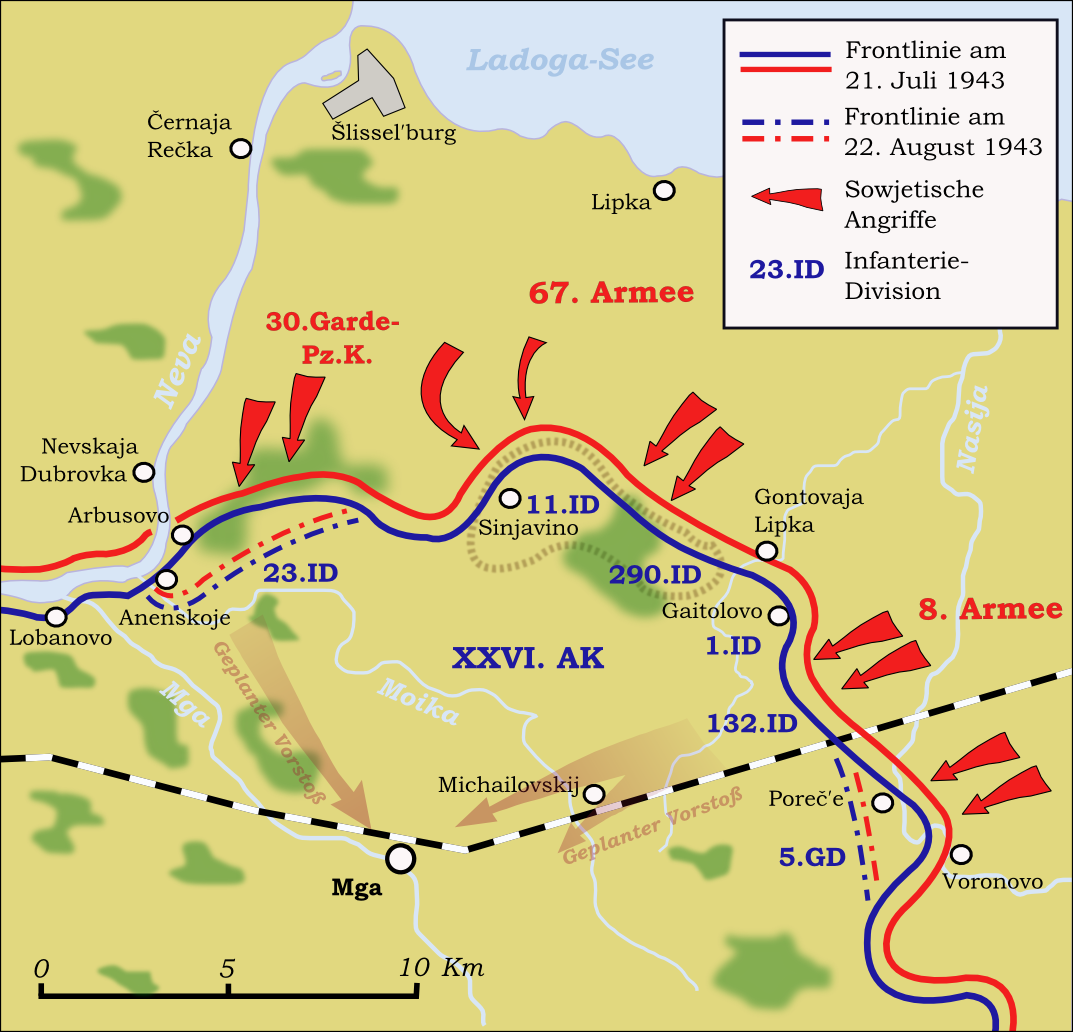
- Map of the battle
Date	22 July – 22 August 1943; 15 – 25 September 1943
Location	Leningrad region,
Result	German victory

Belligerents
(Nazi Germany) Germany	Soviet Union

Commanders and leaders
(Nazi Germany) Georg von Küchler (Nazi Germany) Georg Lindemann	(Soviet Union) Kirill Meretskov (Soviet Union) Leonid Govorov (Soviet Union) Filipp Starikov (Soviet Union) Mikhail Dukhanov

Units involved
Army Group North: 18th Army	Leningrad Front; Volkhov Front; 8th Army; 67th Army

The Mga offensive or Third Battle of Lake Ladoga (German: Dritte Ladoga-Schlacht) or fifth Sinyavino offensive was an unsuccessful offensive operation by Soviet troops between 22 July and 25 September 1943 to break the siege of Leningrad.

== Prelude ==
Leningrad had been surrounded since 8 September 1941. The Soviets had launched several counterattacks in 1941, 1942 and most recently in Spring 1943 with the failed Operation Polar Star. The only success so far had been achieved in January 1943, when during Operation Iskra, a land corridor was opened between Leningrad and the rest of the Soviet Union. However, the land corridor remained within range of German artillery on the Sinyavino Heights, and the Red Army planned a new attack for July 1943.

The attack was to be carried out by the 8th Army (Filipp Starikov) of the Volkhov Front (Kirill Meretskov) and the 67th Army (Mikhail Dukhanov) of the Leningrad Front (Leonid Govorov) against the troops of the German 18th Army (Georg Lindemann) of Army Group North (Georg von Küchler). The goal of the operation was to defeat the enemy group in the area of Mga, restore control over the Kirov Railway and ensure a reliable railway connection between Leningrad and the rest of the Soviet Union.

== The battle ==
On 22 July 1943, at 6:35 a.m., after an hour and a half of artillery fire and a massive air strike, the Soviet troops went on the offensive.

The units of the first echelon of the 8th Army immediately managed to capture the first line of defense of the enemy, but the offensive did not advance any further. In late July, the Soviet command brought into battle the 379th and 165th Rifle Divisions, which replaced the 18th and 256th Divisions, but this did not change the situation in favor of the Red Army. The divisions that entered the battle suffered heavy losses, as German units put up fierce resistance and constantly counterattacked.

On 12 August, in a renewed attack, the Soviet 8th Army took the strong enemy bridgehead east of the Nasija River near Porechye, but failed to breakthrough towards Mga, despite the introduction into battle of the last reserve of the 8th Army - the 311th Rifle Division. The German command was able to quickly strengthen the defense. For several days, Soviet troops tried to advance further, but did not achieve significant results.

The same happened in the northern direction of the front. On 22 July, at the same time as the troops of the 8th Army, units of the 67th Army went on the offensive, and partially broke the enemy's defenses, but failed to exploit the initial success. The German command strengthened its defenses with reserves, sending the 58th, 126th (from the 16th Army), and at the end of the operation the 61st Infantry Divisions and the Soviet offensive was halted. Fierce fighting lasted several weeks and both sides suffered heavy losses.

At the end of August, the fighting gradually began to subside. Despite fierce fighting, the Soviet troops failed to reach the targets set before the start of the operation, and the front line in the area of the Sinyavino Heights differed only slightly from the front line at the beginning of the Soviet offensive.

== Second attack (15–25 September 1943) ==
On the orders of the Stavka, the front commanders Govorov and Meretskov prepared a new offensive only a few weeks after the failure of their first operations. This time the goals were much more narrowly defined and now only included taking the Sinyavino Heights.

The Leningrad Front had refreshed the 30th Guards Rifle Corps in the Leningrad area and then relocated it to the area south of Shlisselburg. There it became temporarily subordinated to General Duchanov's 67th Army. The plan was to use this unit to attack the Sinyavino Heights directly from the north. To the left of the corps it was to be supported by the 43rd and 123rd Rifle Divisions, and to the right by the 120th, 124th and 196th Rifle Divisions. In addition, the 11th and 268th Rifle Divisions were already positioned in front of the Sinyavino Heights. The 8th Army of the Volkhov Front under General Starikov was to support the offensive with an attack between Voronovo and Gaitolovo.

On the morning of 15 September 1943, the attack began again. On this occasion, the Red Army implemented a new artillery concept. This time the Soviet artillery did not pause in their fire when the Soviet infantry was moving forward. The attack of the 30th Guards Rifle Corps with its three divisions was more successful than a few weeks before. The German 11th and 290th infantry divisions were surprised by the new artillery concept and so the Soviet attack units succeeded in gaining several hundred meters of terrain on the Sinyavino Heights. But the 18th Army command moved the 28th Jäger Division as well as the 215th and 61st infantry divisions to the front. With this measure, the German leadership quickly sealed off the Soviet intrusion. In the days that followed, the units of the Soviet 67th Army continued to run against the German defense in order to advance into the lowlands to Mga. However, these attempts were unsuccessful. The attack by the Soviet 8th Army from the east also barely gained ground.

On 18 September 1943, the Stavka therefore again approved the cessation of offensive operations. On 24 September, the fighting for the heights flared up again briefly before the front stabilized again.

== Sources ==
- Glantz, David M. (2005). Leningrad: City Under Siege 1941–1944. Grange Books. ISBN 1840137983.
- Haupt, Werner (1997). Army Group North. The Wehrmacht in Russia 1941–1945. Schiffer Publishing, Atglen, Pennsylvania. ISBN 0764301829.
- Krivosheev, Grigoriy (2001). "Россия и СССР в войнах XX века: Потери вооруженных сил: Статистическое исследование" [Russia and the USSR in the wars of the 20th century: Loss of armed forces: Statistical study] (in Russian). Google translation
- Meretskov, Kirill (1971). На службе народу (in Russian) Serving the People. Imported Publications, Incorporated, (English Translation). ISBN 0828504946.
