= Sharkawshchyna district =

District of Vitebsk region, Belarus

Sharkawshchyna district Шаркаўшчынскі раён (Belarusian) Шарковщинский район (Russian)
- District
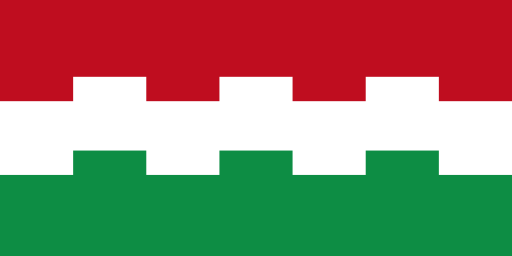
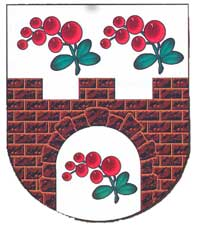
- Flag Coat of arms

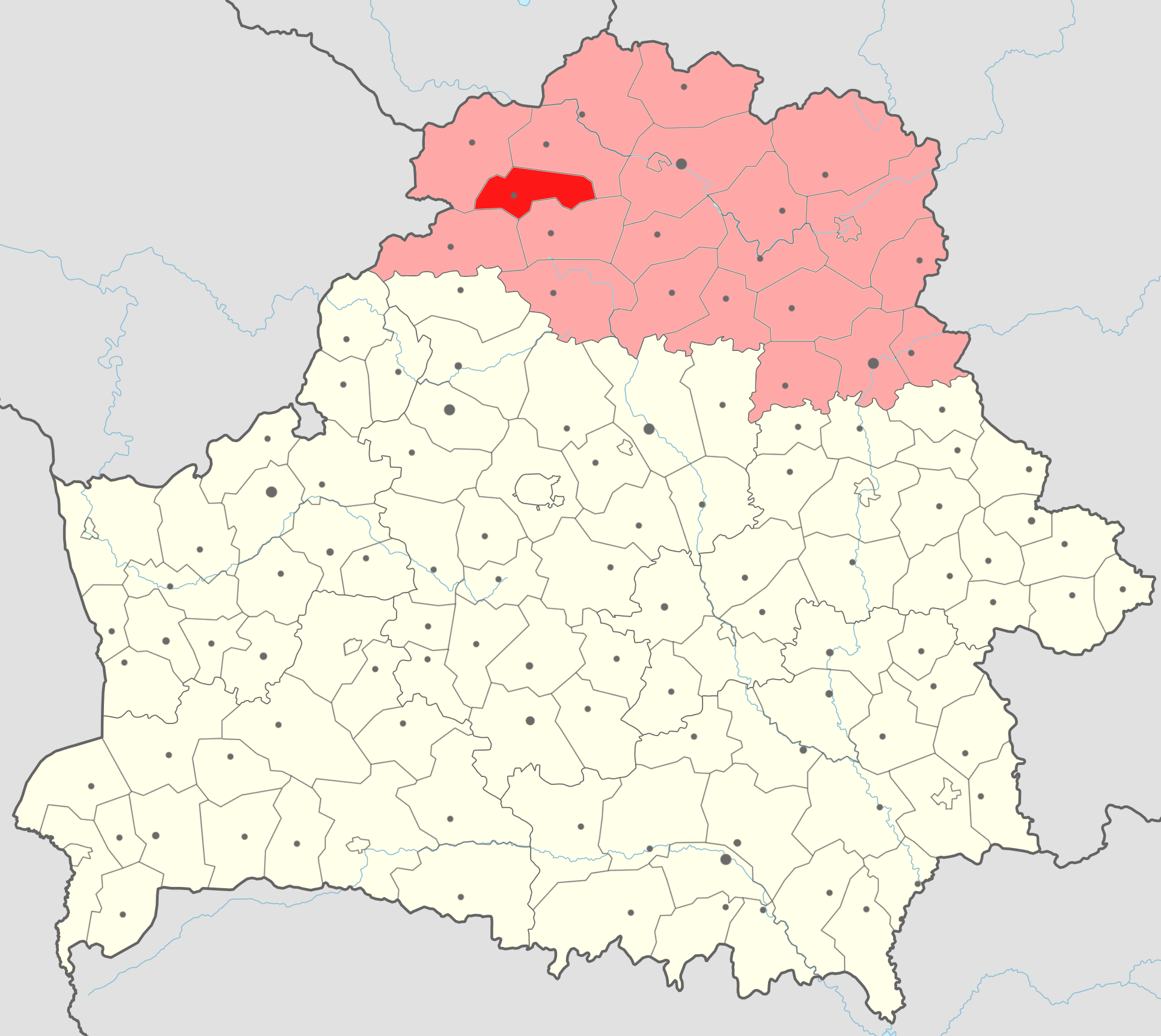
- Coordinates: 55°22′N 27°28′E
- Country: Belarus
- Region: Vitebsk region
- Administrative center: Sharkawshchyna

Area
  - Total: 1,196.98 km^{2} (462.16 sq mi)

Population (2023)
  - Total: 13,362
  - Density: 11.163/km^{2} (28.912/sq mi)
- Time zone: UTC+3 (MSK)

Sharkawshchyna district (Belarusian: Шаркаўшчынскі раён; Russian: Шарковщинский район) is a district (raion) of Vitebsk region in Belarus. The administrative center of the district is the town of Sharkawshchyna.

== Notable residents ==
- Helen Michaluk (born 1930), prominent figure of the Belarusian diaspora who was a long-standing (and the only female) head of the Association of Belarusians in Great Britain.
