= Sharkawshchyna =

Sharkawshchyna: Шаркаўшчына (Belarusian); Шарковщина (Russian)
- Urban-type settlement
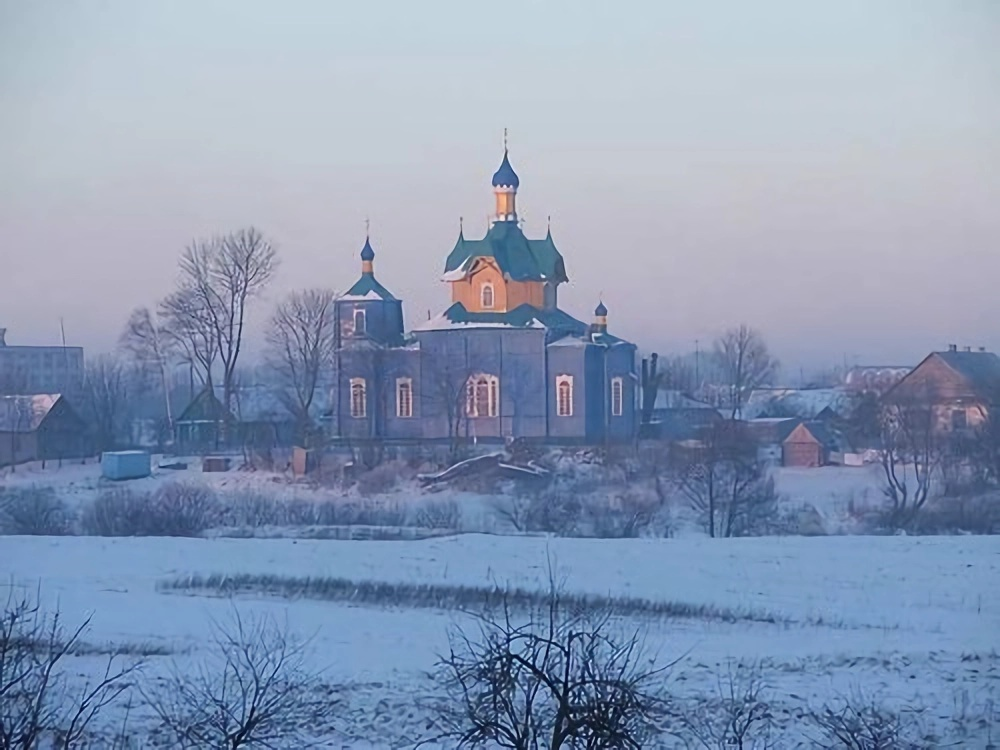
- Sharkawshchyna Orthodox church, founded in 1639, rebuilt in 1912.

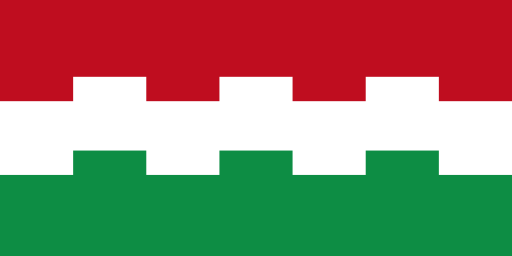
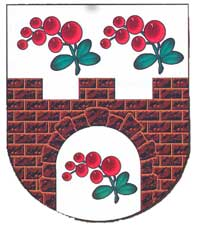
- Flag Coat of arms

- Location within Belarus
- Coordinates: 55°22′N 27°28′E
- Country: Belarus
- Region: Vitebsk Region
- District: Sharkawshchyna District
- First mentioned: 1503
- Elevation: 166 m (545 ft)

Population (2025)
  - Total: 5,945
- Time zone: UTC+3 (MSK)
- Postal code: 211910
- Area code: +375 2154
- License plate: 2

Sharkawshchyna or Sharkovshchina (Note: Belarusian: Шаркаўшчына, romanized: Šarkaŭščyna; Russian: Шарковщина; Polish: Szarkowszczyzna; Yiddish: שאַרקוישטשינע, romanized: Sharkoyshtchine.) is an urban-type settlement in Vitebsk Region, in northern Belarus. It is located 160 kilometres (99 mi) north of the capital Minsk, and serves as the administrative center of Sharkawshchyna District. As of 2025, it has a population of 5,945.

== History ==
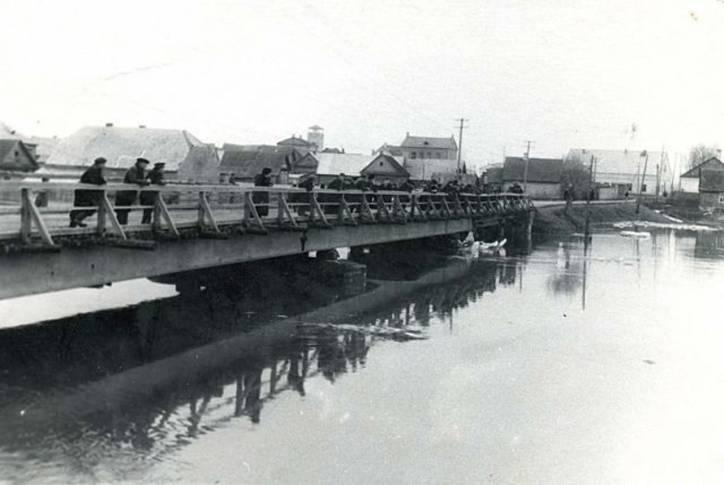
Szarkowszczyzna in the interbellum

Within the Grand Duchy of Lithuania, Sharkawshchyna was part of Vilnius Voivodeship. In 1793, the town was acquired by the Russian Empire as a result of the Second Partition of Poland. From 1921 until 1939, Szarkowszczyzna, as it was known in Polish, was part of the Second Polish Republic, administratively located in the Wilno Voivodeship.

=== World War II ===
At the start of World War II, in September 1939, Szarkowszczyzna was occupied by the Red Army and, on 14 November 1939, incorporated into the Byelorussian SSR. There were an estimated 1,500 Jews on the eve of the war.

Sharkawshchyna was occupied by Nazi Germany on 6–9 July 1941 and administered as a part of the Generalbezirk Weißruthenien of Reichskommissariat Ostland. Between September and November, about 1,700 Jews were rounded up and confined to the local ghetto with severe overcrowding problems. Many died of disease and starvation. At the end of March 1942, the Germans divided the ghetto into two parts: one for "necessary workers" and another ghetto for the others. On 18 June, the German police and local collaborators surrounded the ghetto and opened fire on the ghetto. 700 residents who were unable to successfully escape were escorted away and shot. The Germans later recaptured 300 escapees and shot them. As many as 500 of those who escaped joined the Jews of the nearby ghetto at Głębokie. This was used by several Holocaust researchers from the "Israel school" of Holocaust research, as a study case showing the futility of Jewish resistance in those years.

== Population ==
Population: 5,945 (2025); 6,005 (2024); 6,107 (2023); 6,330 (2017); 6,900 (2010).

== Climate ==
Climate data for Sharkawshchyna (1991–2020)
Month	Jan	Feb	Mar	Apr	May	Jun	Jul	Aug	Sep	Oct	Nov	Dec	Year
Record high °C (°F)	4.3 (39.7)	5.1 (41.2)	11.9 (53.4)	22.3 (72.1)	26.8 (80.2)	28.8 (83.8)	30.4 (86.7)	29.9 (85.8)	24.9 (76.8)	18.0 (64.4)	10.5 (50.9)	5.8 (42.4)	30.4 (86.7)
Mean daily maximum °C (°F)	−2.0 (28.4)	−1.1 (30.0)	4.1 (39.4)	12.4 (54.3)	18.6 (65.5)	22.0 (71.6)	24.1 (75.4)	22.9 (73.2)	17.3 (63.1)	10.1 (50.2)	3.6 (38.5)	−0.4 (31.3)	11.0 (51.8)
Daily mean °C (°F)	−4.2 (24.4)	−4.1 (24.6)	0.1 (32.2)	7.1 (44.8)	12.8 (55.0)	16.5 (61.7)	18.5 (65.3)	17.3 (63.1)	12.2 (54.0)	6.4 (43.5)	1.4 (34.5)	−2.4 (27.7)	6.8 (44.2)
Mean daily minimum °C (°F)	−6.9 (19.6)	−7.1 (19.2)	−3.5 (25.7)	2.2 (36.0)	7.1 (44.8)	10.9 (51.6)	13.2 (55.8)	12.2 (54.0)	7.9 (46.2)	3.3 (37.9)	−0.8 (30.6)	−4.7 (23.5)	2.8 (37.0)
Record low °C (°F)	−21.1 (−6.0)	−19.7 (−3.5)	−12.7 (9.1)	−4.4 (24.1)	−0.2 (31.6)	4.5 (40.1)	8.0 (46.4)	6.0 (42.8)	0.7 (33.3)	−4.3 (24.3)	−10.1 (13.8)	−14.7 (5.5)	−21.1 (−6.0)
Average precipitation mm (inches)	38.5 (1.52)	37.5 (1.48)	34.7 (1.37)	37.0 (1.46)	58.2 (2.29)	73.2 (2.88)	81.0 (3.19)	69.1 (2.72)	57.7 (2.27)	57.3 (2.26)	46.0 (1.81)	42.1 (1.66)	632.3 (24.89)
Average precipitation days (≥ 1.0 mm)	10.4	9.5	8.6	7.3	9.8	10.2	9.9	8.9	8.9	10.7	9.7	10.4	114.3
Mean monthly sunshine hours	37.4	64.0	142.0	199.5	269.5	273.2	281.6	253.0	166.6	91.9	33.2	27.2	1,839.1
Source: NOAA

== Sources ==
- Megargee, Geoffrey P.; Dean, Martin (2012). The United States Holocaust Memorial Museum Encyclopedia of Camps and Ghettos 1933–1945. Volume II. Indiana University Press, United States Holocaust Memorial Museum. pp. 1289–1290. ISBN 978-0-253-35599-7.
