= 28th Rifle Division =

- Active: I Formation: 1918–1941; II Formation: 1941–1945
- Country: Soviet Union
- Branch: Red Army
- Type: Infantry
- Size: Division
- Engagements: Russian Civil War: Kazan Operation; Izhevsk-Votkinsk Uprising; Northern Caucasus Operation (1920); Soviet invasion of Azerbaijan; Battle of Kiev (1941); Battle for Velikiye Luki; Riga Offensive (1944); Courland Pocket
- Decorations: Honorary Revolutionary Red Banner (1st formation); Order of the Red Banner (2nd formation)
- Battle honours: Highland (1st formation) Named for S. Ordzhonikidze (1st formation) Nevel (2nd formation)

Commanders
- Notable commanders: Vladimir Azin (1918-1920)

The 28th Rifle Division was a rifle division in the Soviet Red Army during the Russian Civil War, World War II and the Cold War.

The history of the division dates from the 2nd Consolidated Rifle Division, which took part in the Civil War, and was then renamed the 28th Rifle Division. In the 1930s the 28th Rifle Division was renamed the 28th Highland Mountain Division, which became on September 28, 1936, the 28th Highland Mountain Division 'named for S. Ordzhonikidze' and then on July 16, 1940, the 28th Red Banner Mountain Rifle Division named for S. Ordzhonikidze. (see ru:28-я горнострелковая дивизия)

With the North Caucasus Military District in July 1941. Wiped out during Battle of Kiev, September 1941. Recreated at Archangelsk. With 3rd Shock Army, Kalinin Front, in November 1942. Fought at Velikiye Luki, and at the Battle of Târgu Frumos. With 22nd Army of the Reserve of the Supreme High Command (RVGK) in May 1945.

The division received the honorifics "Nevel Red Banner" during World War II. The division was disbanded before 22 October 1945 with the 100th Rifle Corps in the Odessa Military District.
