= Ivan Korchagin =

Soviet army lieutenant general (1898–1951)

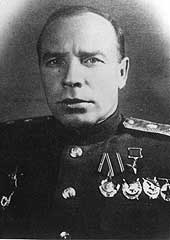
- Korchagin between 1943 and 1944
- Born: 24 August [O.S. 12 August] 1898; Byltsino village, Kozhanskoy volost, Gorokhovetsky Uyezd, Vladimir Governorate, Russian Empire
- Died: 24 July 1951 (aged 52); Moscow, Soviet Union
- Military career
- Allegiance: Russian Empire; Russian SFSR; Soviet Union
- Branch: Imperial Russian Army; Red Army (later Soviet Army)
- Service years: 1914–1918; 1919–1937; 1940–1951
- Rank: Lieutenant general
- Commands: 17th Tank Division (became 126th Tank Brigade); 17th Tank Corps; 18th Tank Corps; 2nd Mechanized Corps (became 7th Guards Mechanized Corps); 8th Mechanized Army
- Conflicts: World War I; Russian Civil War; World War II
- Awards: Hero of the Soviet Union; Order of Lenin (2); Order of the Red Banner (5); Order of Kutuzov, 1st class; Order of Suvorov, 2nd class; Order of the Red Star

Ivan Petrovich Korchagin (Russian: Иван Петрович Корчагин; 24 August [O.S. 12 August] 1898 – 24 July 1951) was a Soviet Army lieutenant general and a Hero of the Soviet Union.

Korchagin volunteered for the Imperial Russian Army during World War I, during which he was wounded multiple times and decorated. He rose from private to junior officer and joined the Red Army during the Russian Civil War. After serving with the Internal Troops in the latter, Korchagin was stationed in Soviet Central Asia during the 1920s, serving in various command and staff positions. In the mid-1930s he became commander of a mechanized brigade before being arrested during the Great Purge. Korchagin was released in 1940 and reinstated in the Red Army, commanding the 17th Tank Division at the outbreak of Operation Barbarossa. Korchagin led the division in the Battle of Smolensk and continued in command after it was reorganized into a brigade due to heavy losses. After his brigade was destroyed in the Battle of Moscow, Korchagin became responsible for aerosani units before commanding the 17th and 18th Tank Corps in the Battle of Voronezh. He became commander of the 2nd Mechanized Corps, which later became the 7th Guards Mechanized Corps, in September 1942, leading it for the rest of the war. Made a Hero of the Soviet Union for his leadership of the corps during the Battle of the Dnieper, Korchagin held army command postwar.

== Early life, World War I, and Russian Civil War ==
Korchagin was born on 24 August 1898 in the village of Byltsino, Kozhanskoy volost, Gorokhovetsky uyezd, Vladimir Governorate. The son of a worker, he completed sixth grade at the Vyazniki male gymnasium in 1914.

During World War I, Korchagin was mobilized into the Imperial Russian Army in October 1914 and volunteered to be sent to the 22nd Nizhny Novgorod Infantry Regiment. From November he fought on the Southwestern Front, with the 312th Vasilkov Infantry Regiment of the 78th Infantry Division. After being hospitalized between May and November 1915, he returned to the division to become a private in the 310th Shatsk Infantry Regiment during the latter month. Sent to the Kovrov-based 250th Reserve Infantry Regiment in February 1916, Korchagin entered the 5th Moscow School of Praporshchiks as a junker in May 1916, and after graduation in October returned to the regiment as an officer. Returning to the 312th Regiment as a company commander in December, he was wounded and hospitalized in February 1917. In May he returned to the 250th Reserve Regiment as a half-company commander. Korchagin returned to the front to take his old position with the 312th Regiment in July, but was hospitalized again between October and December. After recovering, he served with the 258th Reserve Regiment in Gorokhovets as a company commander, ending the war with the rank of podporuchik. For his actions, Korchagin was awarded the Cross of St. George twice. Korchagin became an instructor with the Gorokhovetsky Uyezd military commissariat in May 1918.

During the Russian Civil War, Korchagin joined the Red Army on 1 August 1918 and was sent to the 60th Gorokhovets Rifle Regiment of the 7th Separate Brigade, serving successively as a company commissar, company commander, and battalion commander. In May 1919 he was appointed military leader of the transport Cheka in Vladimir, and in August became chief of security and defense of the district VOKhR troops. From May 1920 he was officer for errands of the chief of defense of the Kursk railway in Moscow.

== Interwar period ==
Korchagin commanded a battalion of the 501st Railroad Regiment of the VNUS troops in Nizhny Novgorod from November 1920, and from January 1921 was acting assistant chief of staff of the 10st Rifle Brigade of the VNUS troops in Ryazan and Vladimir. In mid-1921 he was sent to the Turkestan Front, where he served as chief of repeat courses for the front command personnel. Korchagin temporarily commanded the 1st and later the 2nd Turkestan Rifle Regiments of the 1st Turkestan Rifle Division in Ashgabat from September 1922. In December 1924 he transferred to the 2nd Turkestan Rifle Division to serve as chief of staff of the 4th Turkestan Rifle Regiment, and from December 1925 was commander of the division's 5th Turkestan Rifle Regiment. Korchagin transferred to the 1st Turkestan Mountain Rifle Division (the former 1st Turkestan Rifle Division) to command its 3rd Turkestan Mountain Rifle Regiment in January 1927 after graduating from the Vystrel course, and while stationed in Turkestan fought against the Basmachi movement.

Korchagin transferred to the Leningrad Military District in November 1930 to serve a chief of staff of the Pskov-based 56th Rifle Division. In 1932 he became a member of the Communist Party of the Soviet Union. He was appointed head of the 9th section of the district staff in February 1935 before taking command of the 31st Mechanized Brigade of the 7th Mechanized Corps in November 1936. Korchagin was arrested by the NKVD in August 1937 during the Great Purge, accused of treason under Article 58-1b. He was released due to lack of evidence in February 1940, rehabilitated, and reinstated in the Red Army, being appointed chief of infantry of the 121st Rifle Division of the 24th Rifle Corps of the Belorussian Special Military District. This posting proved to be brief, as in June Korchagin was made head of the Lepel Rifle Mortar School, and a month later appointed deputy commander of the 17th Tank Division of the 5th Mechanized Corps of the Transbaikal Military District. Korchagin succeeded to command of the division in March 1941 after his predecessor, Major General Ilya Alekseyenko, became corps commander. In late May the division and its corps began a rail journey across the country to redeploy to the Kiev region.

== World War II ==
As a result of the beginning of Operation Barbarossa, the German invasion of the Soviet Union, on 22 June 1941, the division was relocated to the Orsha area with the corps and placed at the disposal of the Western Front. Arriving in the designated concentration area on 30 June, the corps was attached to the 20th Army on 2 July. The corps soon entered combat in the Lepel counterattack and suffered heavy losses. After the 14th Tank Division on the 17th's right flank began to withdraw to Senno and Vitebsk, Korchagin had to commit his reserve regiment to cover the right flank. While engaged in this shift, the junction of the 17th with the 13th Tank Division on its left flank was attacked by German troops, forcing the commitment of two more battalions from the 33rd Tank Regiment. The division ended up fighting in encirclement, breaking out on the night of 9–10 July. For his leadership of the division, Korchagin was awarded the Order of the Red Banner on 9 August.

After leaving encirclement in the Battle of Smolensk, Korchagin was appointed commander of the 126th Tank Brigade, formed from the remnants of the 17th Tank Division, with which he fought in the Battle of Moscow. After the brigade was destroyed in the Vyazma pocket, he became head of the 7th (Aerosani) Directorate of the Red Army Main Auto-Armored Directorate on 23 December 1941, forming two aerosani schools and 55 separate aerosani battalions during his tenure. Promoted to major general of tank troops in May 1942, Korchagin was appointed deputy commander of the tank group of the Bryansk Front on 28 June 1942, but the group was not actually formed and instead he was given command of the 17th Tank Corps two days later. He led the corps in attempts to assist the advance of the 40th Army during the Battle of Voronezh and on 24 July transferred to command the 18th Tank Corps of the Voronezh Front.

Korchagin took command of the 2nd Mechanized Corps in September and was promoted to lieutenant general of tank troops on 18 January 1943. He led the corps during Operation Kutuzov, in which the corps was converted into the 7th Guards Mechanized Corps in recognition of its performance. It recaptured Sevsk, Oryol, and Mtsensk during the offensive, and from September 1943 advanced into Left-bank Ukraine as part of the 60th Army. Among the fortified points recaptured was Nezhin and on 25 September the corps crossed the Dnieper north of Kiev, capturing and holding a bridgehead on the right bank. For his leadership of the corps, which included personally supervising the Dnieper crossing, Korchagin received the title Hero of the Soviet Union and was awarded the Order of Lenin on 17 October 1943. The corps subsequently fought in the Lower Silesian Offensive, the Upper Silesian Offensive, the Berlin Offensive, and the Prague Offensive in 1945 under Korchagin's command.

== Postwar ==
After the end of the war, Korchagin continued in command of the corps, which was reorganized into the 7th Guards Mechanized Division. He studied at the Higher Academic Course at the Voroshilov Higher Military Academy from May 1946 and upon graduation in April 1947 was appointed commander of the armored and mechanized forces of the Southern Group of Forces. Korchagin became commander of the 8th Mechanized Army in February 1948, and in September 1950 was placed at the disposal of the Soviet Ministry of War. Appointed deputy chief of the Main Auto-Tractor Directorate of the Ministry of War in April 1951, Korchagin died on 24 July of that year in Moscow and was buried at the Novodevichy Cemetery.

== Awards and honors ==
Korchagin received the following awards and decorations:

- Hero of the Soviet Union
- Order of Lenin (2)
- Order of the Red Banner (5)
- Order of Kutuzov, 1st class
- Order of Suvorov, 2nd class
- Order of the Red Star
- Cross of St. George, 3rd and 4th class (not worn after 1917)
