= Alexander Lizyukov =

Soviet major-general (1900–1942)

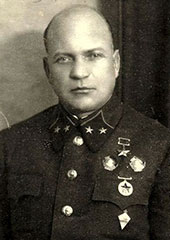
- Born: March 26, 1900; Gomel, Russian Empire
- Died: 23 July 1942 (aged 42); Voronezh Oblast, Soviet Union
- Military career
- Allegiance: Soviet Union
- Rank: Major General
- Conflicts: Russian Civil War; Polish–Soviet War; Tambov Rebellion; World War II; Battle of Smolensk; First Battle of Kharkov; Battle of Moscow; Battle of Voronezh †
- Awards: Hero of the Soviet Union

Alexander Ilyich Lizyukov (Russian: Алекса́ндр Ильи́ч Лизюко́в; 26 March 1900 – 23 July 1942) was a Soviet military leader holding the rank of major-general. He was awarded the title of Hero of the Soviet Union on 5 August 1941.

He was the brother of the Hero of the Soviet Union Pyotr Ilyich Lizyukov.

== Russian Civil War and inter-war years ==
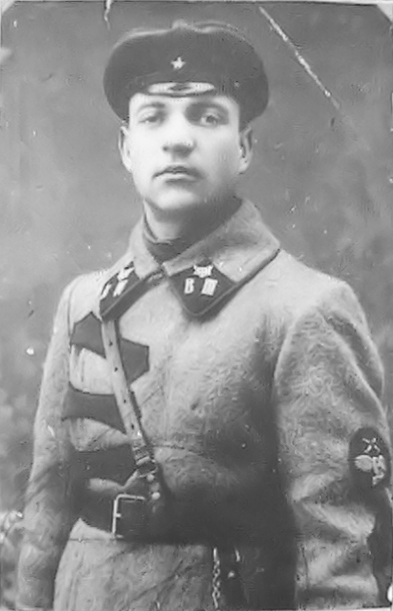
Lizyukov in 1923

Lizyukov joined the Red Army in April 1919, and fought in the Russian Civil War against the White Guard as an artillery officer. He saw action in the Polish–Soviet War, as well as during the Tambov Rebellion.

Between 1924 and 1927 Lizyukov was educated at the Frunze Military Academy, and taught armour tactics courses at KUVNAS. In the 1930s he commanded the 3rd Tank Battalion at Naro-Fominsk in the Moscow Military District.

== Great Patriotic War ==
From March 1941, Colonel Lizyukov was the deputy commander of the 17th Mechanized Corps (commanded by Major General M. P. Petrov) of the 36th Tank Division in the Western Special Military District, which became the Western Front on 22 June 1941, and was initially command by General D. G. Pavlov. On 22 June 1941, at the start of Operation Barbarossa, Nazi Germany's invasion of the Soviet Union during World War II, Lizyukov's 17th Mechanized Corps was stationed near Slonim, and was opposed by the German Army Group Center.

=== Borisov and Smolensk (1941) ===
On 26 June 1941, Colonel Lizyukov arrived in Borisov, where he participated in the defense of the city until 8 July 1941, and was awarded the Order of the Red Banner for courage and bravery. In early August 1941, after the death of Major General of Tank Forces Ilya Alekseyenko on 2 August 1941, Colonel Lizyukov took command of the remnants of 5th Mechanized Corps, and held open the narrow Solov'evo and Ratchino corridors across the Dnieper river south of Iartsevo during the Battle of Smolensk (1941), allowing elements of the 16th Army and 20th Army to escape encirclement. For courage in action, he was awarded the title of Hero of the Soviet Union, with a Gold Star, on 5 August 1941, along with the Order of Lenin, in lieu of the award of the Order of the Red Banner.

In August 1941, Colonel Lizyukov took command of the 1st Moscow Motor Rifle Division, and was assigned the defense of the Vop River northeast of Iartsevo. In early September 1941, this division drove its German enemy from the east side across the river and established a bridgehead, and the division was converted into the 1st Guards Motor Rifle Division.

=== Moscow (1941) ===
From 30 September 1941 until 10 October 1941, Colonel Lizyukov's 1st Guards Motor Rifle Division participated in a holding action around the town of Sumy as part of the mechanized cavalry group of the 21st Army, in some of the first action of the First Battle of Kharkov. On 6 October 1941, Southwestern Front decided to attempt to attack into the German right flank, resulting in the collapse of the defensive line and the breakthrough of the German 29th Infantry Division into Sumy on 10 October 1041. The division was subsequently withdrawn into the reserve around Moscow.

Now part of 33rd Army, which covered the Naro-Fominsk area southwest of Moscow, the division was tasked with taking the offensive to the south and west of Naro-Fominsk. It ran squarely into elements of the German 4th Army on 22 October 1941, and was pushed back into the city, and was involved in running street battles between 23 and 25 October, losing about 70% of its strength. On 26 October, the division retrenched on the left bank of the Nara River and stopped the German advance. On 28 October, Lizyukov was ordered to assault the city, but was pushed back amidst heavy losses. In November, Colonel Lizyukov was recalled to Moscow, and was replaced by Colonel Timofey Novikov.

On November 27, 1941, Colonel Lizyukov was named deputy commander of the newly re-formed 20th Army, under the command of General A. A. Vlasov. The 20th Army was tasked on 2 December 1941 to defend Moscow on the Leningrad highway to the northeast of Moscow, and was ordered to counter-attack against the advancing German troops. On 12 December, a brigade under the command of A. I. Lizyukov liberated Solnechnogorsk.

=== Demyansk Pocket (1942) ===
On 10 January 1942 Colonel Lizyukov was awarded the rank of major-general, and was appointed commander of the 2nd Guards Rifle Corps, which was assigned to the Northwestern Front in the Kalinin region. 2nd Guards Rifle Corps, along with 1st Guards Rifle Corps, 34th Army, and 1st Shock Army, were tasked with cutting the main communications line of the Leningrad-Volkhov elements of the enemy in the Pskov area. By the end of February 1941, 2nd Guards Rifle Corps had moved from Staraya Russa to the west of the Demyansk Pocket to encircle about 95,000 German troops. Major-General Lizyukov was awarded the Order of the Red Banner for his actions.

In mid-April 1942 Major-General Lizyukov was ordered to form the 2nd Tank Corps, which was subsequently included in the setup of the 5th Tank Army, and in June 1942, Major-General Lizyukov was appointed its commander. 5th Tank Army was deployed in the Bryansk Front, first in the area south-west of Yelets and then north-west of Yefremov.

=== Battle of Voronezh (1942) ===
During the early stages of the Battle of Voronezh (1942), the command of the Bryansk Front selected 5th Tank Army under Major-General Lizyukov to organize a counter-attack on the flank and rear of the German troops advancing on Voronezh. On 5 July 1942 the army was ordered to immediately break through to the Don River at Voronezh. Given the scattered locations of his corps and the tight schedule of the order, Lizyukov started his movements without the ability to fully concentrate his forces, but sent the 7th Tank Corps on 6 July, followed by the other units on 7 and 10 July 1942. In addition, instead of cutting into the flanks of the enemy, 5th Army faced 24th Panzer Division frontally, as this unit had moved south instead of east in accordance to the planning for Case Blue, and not as expected by the Stavka.

By the time the counter-offensive ended, the 5th Tank Army only had 27% of its tanks still operational, and had suffered nearly 8,000 casualties, and Major General Lizyukov was demoted on 15 July 1942 to command the 2nd Tank Corps, after the Stavka disbanded 5th Tank Army. On 23 July 1942 Major General Lizyukov received orders from General Chibisov to locate and to counter-attack with his corps' two tank brigades. He commandeered a KV tank to rescue his two brigades from encirclement, but was immobilized just short of the German prepared defensive positions, and was killed in action.
