= Yury Novoselsky =

Yury Vladimirovich Novoselsky
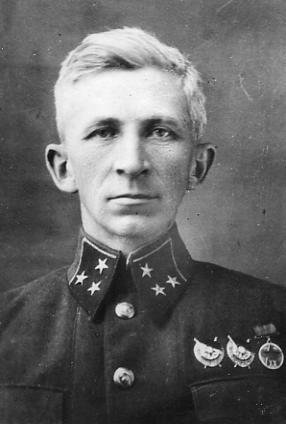
- Novoselsky, 1942
- Born: 17 August 1895; Moscow, Russian Empire
- Died: 10 December 1975 (aged 80); Moscow, Soviet Union
- Military career
- Allegiance: Russian Empire; Soviet Union
- Branch: Imperial Russian Army; Red Army
- Service years: 1915–1917; 1918–1950
- Rank: General-leytenant
- Commands: 50th Rifle Division; 4th Rifle Corps; 86th Rifle Division; 2nd Mechanized Corps; 146th Rifle Division; 97th Rifle Corps; 7th Guards Rifle Corps; 55th Rifle Corps
- Conflicts: World War I; Russian Civil War; World War II
- Awards: Order of Lenin

Yury Vladimirovich Novoselsky (Russian: Юрий Владимирович Новосельский; 17 August 1895 – 10 December 1975) was a Red Army general-leytenant who held corps and divisional commands during World War II.

After being captured as a junior officer during World War I, Novoselsky returned to fight in the Russian Civil War. He rose through command positions in the interwar Red Army and led the 86th Motor Rifle Division during the Winter War. When Germany invaded the Soviet Union, Novoselsky was in command of the 2nd Mechanized Corps, destroyed in the Battle of Uman. He escaped from encirclement and ended the war as a rifle corps commander. Novoselsky continued to hold senior positions until his retirement.

== Early life, World War I and Russian Civil War ==
Yury Vladimirovich Novoselsky was born on 17 August 1895 in Moscow. He graduated from the six-year 2nd Moscow Realschule in 1914. During World War I, he was mobilized into the army in May 1915 and sent to the Preobrazhensky Life Guards Regiment at Petrograd. After graduating from the regimental training detachment in September, he was sent to the 2nd Moscow School for Praporshchiks to receive junior officer training, as a soldier with prior education. After graduating from the school in February 1916, Novoselsky was posted to the 191st Reserve Infantry Regiment in Moscow, where he serve as a junior officer and assistant chief of the training detachment. In June he went to the Western Front as a volunteer with the 11th March Battalion. On the front, Novoselsky served as a junior officer and acting company commander with the 217th Kovrov Infantry Regiment of the 55th Infantry Division. He was promoted to podporuchik for distinguishing himself in battle. During the fighting, he was gassed and taken prisoner by German troops on 27 November. Novoselsky was held in camps in Germany at Stralsund, Guterelo, Kustrin, Torgau, and Preußisch Holland.

Novoselsky was freed in a prisoner exchange on 4 December 1918 and returned to Moscow in the midst of the Russian Civil War. He joined the Red Army six days later and was appointed a squad leader in the 88th Workers' Regiment in Moscow. He was transferred to the 317th Rifle Regiment of the 36th Rifle Division in April 1919, serving as a platoon leader, chief of the regimental school, battalion commander and assistant regimental commander. With the division, he fought with the 9th Army on the Southeastern Front against the White Armed Forces of South Russia. After catching typhus in March 1920 he was sent to the infantry inspectorate of the army, and a month later appointed commander of the Separate Novocherkassk Battalion of Convalescents. In June he became chief and commissar of the 3rd Battalion of the Don Oblast Territorial District, and in November, chief of the Rostov Territorial District and a detachment of Special Purpose (ChON).

== Interwar period and Winter War ==
In February 1921, Novoselsky was sent to the Caucasian Front as instructor for assignments at the front Vsevobuch Directorate, then in April appointed commander and commissar of the Kuban-Black Sea Territorial Regiment ChON. In August he was appointed instructor for assignments at the Vsevobuch Directorate of the North Caucasus Military District Form November of that year he served in the 22nd Rifle Division as assistant commander of the 190th Rifle Regiment, then as a battalion commander and assistant commander of the 64th Rifle Regiment. From May 1923 he served as chief of the summer training camps of the division, and in December took command of the 65th Novorossiysk Rifle Regiment.

Novoselsky left the Caucasus for the Moscow Military District, being posted to the Moscow Military-Political School in February 1924 as chief of combat units. He took command of the 1st Moscow Separate Regiment in August and the 243rd Medyn Rifle Regiment of the 81st Rifle Division at Kaluga and Medyn. After completing the Vystrel course between September 1927 and September 1928, he continued to command the regiment. Novoselsky was relived of command for "excesses in collectivization in Medyn" in December 1929 and in February 1930 appointed commander of the 18th Rifle Regiment of the 6th Rifle Division at Livny.

From May 1931, he served as chief of staff of the 50th Rifle Division at Solnechnogorsk. Novoselsky rose to assistant commander of the 14th Rifle Division at Vladimir in April 1932, and in February 1934 transferred to hold the same position with the 29th Rifle Division at Vyazma. When the Red Army introduced personal military ranks, he received the rank of kombrig on 26 November 1935. In July 1937 he rose to command the 50th Rifle Division while serving as chief of the Polotsk Fortified Region, and from July 1938 temporarily commanded the 4th Rifle Corps of the Belorussian Special Military District at Vitebsk. For successes in combat training, he was awarded the Order of the Red Banner on 22 February 1938. In August Novoselsky was transferred to command the 86th Rifle Division of the Volga Military District at Kazan. The division was reorganized into a motor rifle division and sent to the Northwestern Front.

During the Winter War, Novoselsky led the division in the fighting to capture the northern part of the Koivisto peninsula and nearby islands in Vyborg Bay between late February and 12 March, an action known as the Battle of Vyborg Bay. On the right of the 28th Rifle Corps, the division moved across the ice of the bay, with the 169th Motor Rifle Regiment and two ski battalions capturing Tuppura on 2 March at the cost of up to 320 casualties, including 60 killed. Two days later, the 86th Rifle Division began crossing the bay to the Finnish side, with the 169th Motor Rifle Regiment, supported by a tank battalion, crossing the ice to Häränpääniemi, capturing a bridgehead. The 284th Motor Rifle Regiment reached Vilaniemi on the right. The division faced a Finnish counterattack on 6 March, managing to hold its bridgehead at Vilaniemi. On 9 March the corps was ordered to go on the offensive, with the 86th covering the left flank of the corps' main forces, ordered to reach the line of Säkkijärvi and Alauotila. As the war ended, the 330th took Alauotila, driving back the Finnish battalion. However, the 169th and 284th were halted east of Muhulahti, unable to reach Säkkijärvi. For his performance, Novoselsky was awarded the Order of the Red Banner and promoted to the rank of komdiv on 21 March 1940.

Novoselsky was appointed chief of the Vystrel course on 14 May 1940, but did not actually take the position and in early June took command of the 2nd Mechanized Corps of the Odessa Military District at Tiraspol. When the Red Army introduced general officer ranks, Novoselsky received the rank of general-leytenant. From November he completed the Improvement Course for Higher Command Personnel at the Academy of the General Staff, and from May 1941 returned to command of the 2nd Mechanized Corps of the 9th Army. On paper, this was a formidable force of as many as 527 tanks on 22 June, but only 60 were the new T-34 and KV tanks.

== Eastern Front ==
Alerted on the night of 21–22 June by army headquarters, Novoselsky assembled his subordinates and transmitted the 9th Army's orders to bring troops to full combat readiness, move out of bases, and camouflage equipment. After Germany invaded the Soviet Union on 22 June, Novoselsky led the corps in defensive battles in the region of Beltsy, Khristinovka, and Uman as part of the 9th Army of the Southern Front. From July the 2nd Mechanized Corps, shifted to the 12th Army covered the retreat of the Southern Front in the Uman region. Novoselsky and his corps were encircled in the Uman Pocket between 3 and 18 August. On 10 August, changing into civilian clothes, he buried his decorations and documents in the region of Chistopolye, Kirovograd Oblast, and with a small group reached Soviet lines. After leaving the encirclement he was placed at the disposal of the Southern Front Military Council in September and in the first half of October was sent to the Academy of the General Staff. Novoselsky was in the group of officers with Kliment Voroshilov and from 15 January 1942 formed the 146th Rifle Division at Kazan in the Volga Military District.

Novoselsky's division was sent to the Western Front in March. Assigned to the 50th Army, it took part in fighting on the Yelnya axis. By a front order of 11 June, he was relieved of command for "heavy losses in battle, indiscipline and negligence." Novoselsky was again placed at Voroshilov's disposal and in November became assistant commander of the Bryansk Front for the formation of new units. During winter and spring 1943 he commanded an Operational Group of the front operating on the Romny axis.

In November, Novoselsky was appointed commander of the 97th Rifle Corps of the 2nd Baltic Front, the former Bryansk Front. For his performance as commander of the corps during the Leningrad–Novgorod offensive, on 14 February 1944, army commander Vasily Yushkevich recommended Novoselsky for the Order of Kutuzov, 2nd class, which was downgraded to the Order of Suvorov, 2nd class and awarded much later on 6 April 1945. The recommendation read:

Under the command of Lieutenant General Novoselsky, the troops of the corps as a result of bitter fighting, beginning on 14 January 1944, broke through the permanent first and second defensive zones of the enemy in the region of the station of...The units of the corps advanced 13 to 15 kilometers, cut the Dno–Novosokolniki railroad, and liberated 46 settlements. The 331st Infantry Division of the enemy was destroyed, up to 5,000 soldiers and officers wiped out...For successful fulfillment of combat missions, skillful leadership and displaying selflessness in this, he is worthy of the award of the Order of Suvorov, 2nd class.

From March 1944 he commanded the 22nd Army's 7th Guards Rifle Corps. During the Riga Offensive his corps took the towns of Zilupe, Ludza, Rēzekne, Viļāni, and Varakļāni. Novoselsky served as deputy commander of the 10th Guards Army of the front from 12 August 1944. He took command of the 55th Rifle Corps of the Separate Coastal Army in Crimea on 22 September. The corps was sent west to the 21st Army of the 1st Ukrainian Front in December. Novoselsky led the corps in the Sandomierz–Silesian Offensive, during which its units, advancing on Oppeln, flanked the German troops in Silesia, enabling their encirclement. In the final months of the war the corps took part in the Upper Silesian Offensive, encircling and destroying the German troops around Oppeln.

== Postwar ==
After the end of the war, Novoselsky's corps was disbanded in August 1945, and he was placed at the disposal of the Main Cadre Directorate. From November he served as deputy commander of the 6th Guards Army of the Baltic Military District, and in July 1946 became assistant commander of the 10th Guards Army of the Leningrad Military District. In April 1948 he was appointed deputy chairman of the Rifle Tactical Committee of the Ground Forces. He was transferred to the reserve on 28 July 1950. Novoselsky died in Moscow on 10 December 1975.

== Awards ==
Novoselsky was a recipient of the following decorations:

- Order of Lenin
- Order of the Red Banner (4)
- Order of Suvorov, 2nd class
- Order of Kutuzov, 2nd class (2)
- Order of the Red Star
- Silver Cross of the Virtuti Militari (19 December 1968)
