= Lend-Lease Sherman tanks =

M4A2 Sherman III
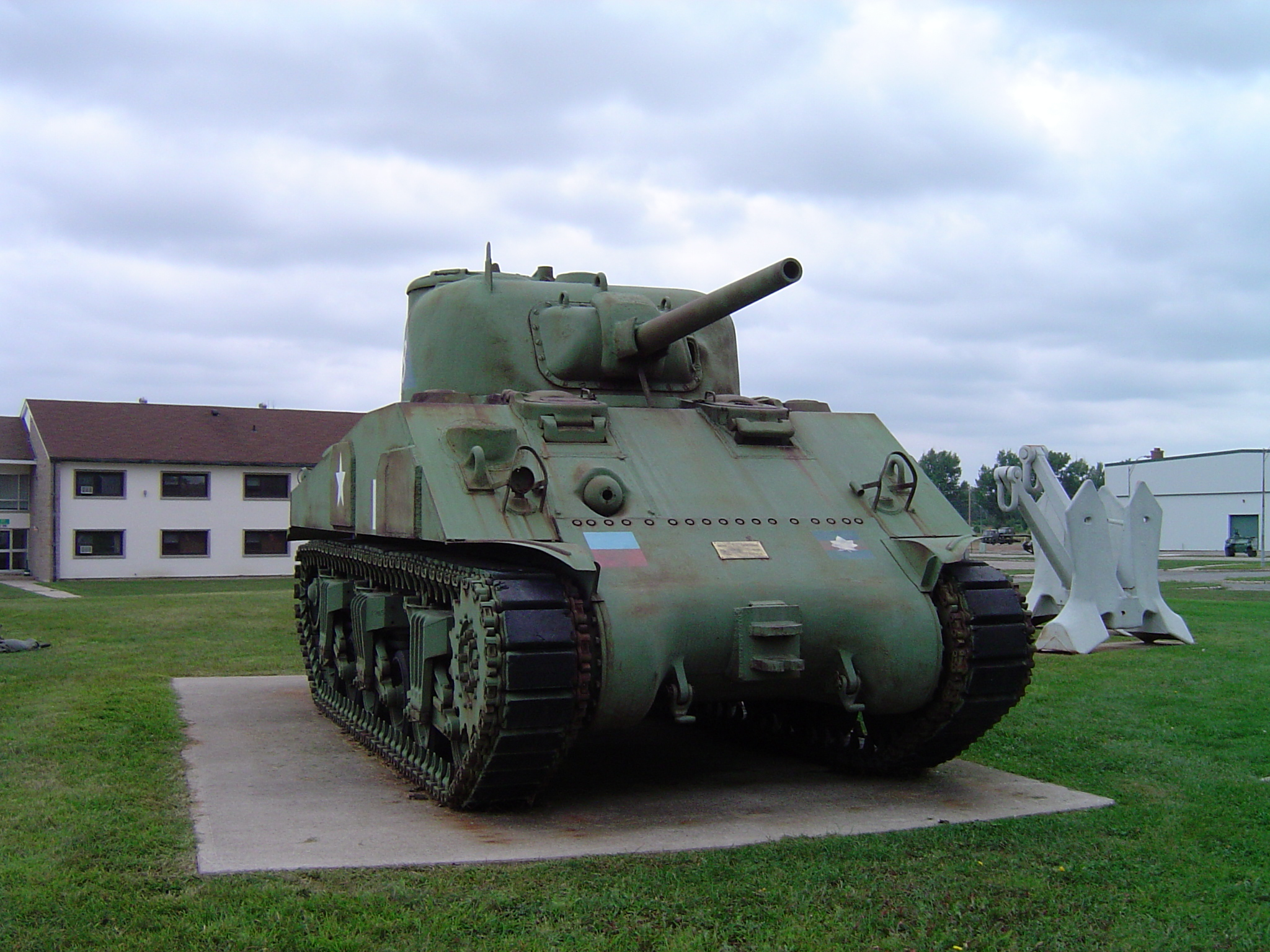
- Medium Tank M4A2, known as Sherman III in British service. Most of these, the only large-production diesel variant, were provided through Lend-Lease to the Allies
- Type: Medium tank
- Place of origin: United States

Service history
- Wars: World War II

Production history
- Produced: April 1942 – May 1945
- No. built: 8,053

Specifications
- Mass: 29.94 tonnes (66,000 lbs) empty, late production vehicles
- Length: 5.92 m (19 ft 5 in)
- Width: 2.62 m (8 ft 7 in)
- Height: 2.74 m (9.0 ft)
- Crew: 5
- Armor: 13–108 mm (0.51–4.25 in) late production
- Main armament: 75 mm M3 Gun; 97 rounds
- Secondary armament: 1× .50 Browning M2HB heavy machinegun 300 rounds 2× .30-06 Browning M1919A4 machineguns 4,750 rounds
- Engine: General Motors 6046 diesel 410 hp (310 kW) gross at 2,900 rpm 375 hp (280 kW) net at 2,100 rpm
- Power/weight: 12.89 hp/tonne
- Suspension: Vertical Volute Spring Suspension (VVSS)
- Ground clearance: 430 mm (17 in)
- Fuel capacity: 148 US gal (560 L)
- Operational range: 240 km (150 mi)
- Maximum speed: 48 km/h (30 mi/h) brief level

Lend-Lease Sherman tanks were those medium tanks that were supplied to allies by the United States during the Second World War.

The United States provided tens of thousands of its Medium Tank M4, also named the Sherman, to many of its Allies, under the terms of Lend-Lease.

== International distribution ==
This chart shows Lend-Lease shipments to major recipients through 1 September 1945; subsequent transfers between countries within theaters of operations (i.e., from the United Kingdom to Poland or Canada, or the United States to Free France or China) after initial shipment are not included.

Lend-Lease shipments of Sherman tanks
Variant	United Kingdom	Soviet Union	Other (Canada, Brazil, Free France)	Total
M4 (75 mm)	2,096		53 (to Brazil)	2,149
M4 (105 mm)	593			593
M4A1 (75 mm)	942		4 (to Canada)	946
M4A1 (76 mm)	1,330			1,330
M4A2 (75 mm)	5,041	1,990	382 (to Free France)	7,413
M4A2 (76 mm)	5	2,073		2,078
M4A3 (75 mm)	7			7
M4A4 (75 mm)	7,167	2	274 (to Free France)	7,443
Total	17,181	4,065	713	21,959

== British nomenclature ==
The British received far more M4 medium tanks, 17,181 (roughly 34% of all M4s produced), than any other Allied nation. The British practice of naming American tanks after American Civil War generals was continued, giving it the name Sherman after Union General William Tecumseh Sherman. The US later adopted the name and the practice of naming tanks after generals and initially used the full name "General Sherman"

In the British naming system, the major variants were identified by Mark numbers, the M4 being "Sherman I", the M4A1 "Sherman II" and so on. Letters after the mark number denoted modifications to the base model: "A" for the 76 mm L/55 gun instead of the 75mm, "B" for the 105 mm M4 L/22.5 howitzer, "C" for the British 76.2 mm QF 17-pounder gun, and "Y" for the later wider-tracked Horizontal Volute Spring Suspension (HVSS) type suspension. Gun and suspension letters were used in combination, e.g. Sherman IBY. However, not every combination appeared eg no production 75mm Shermans were built with HVSS and hence no HVSS 17pdr conversions - which would have been designated "CY" - therefore existed. HVSS Shermans were only fitted with 76mm M1 guns or 105mm M4 howitzers, AY and BY respectively in British service.

- Sherman I – M4 with 75 mm M3 L/40 gun and Continental R975 9-cylinder radial petrol engine
  - Sherman Hybrid I – Sherman I with composite hull (cast front, welded rear)
  - Sherman IB – Sherman I with 105 mm M4 L/22.5 howitzer
    - Sherman IBY – Sherman IB with HVSS
  - Sherman IC – Sherman I with 76.2 mm QF 17-pounder gun
- Sherman II – M4A1 with 75 mm M3 L/40 gun and Continental R975 radial petrol engine
  - Sherman IIA – M4A1(76)W, Sherman II with 76 mm M1 L/55 gun
    - Sherman IIAY – M4A1(76)W HVSS, Sherman IIA with HVSS
- Sherman III – M4A2 with 75 mm M3 L/40 gun and GM6046 twin 6-cylinder diesel engine
  - Sherman IIIA – M4A2(76)W, Sherman III with 76 mm M1A2 L/55 gun (unlikely to have been used by UK troops)
    - Sherman IIIAY – M4A2(76)W HVSS, Sherman IIIA with HVSS (not used operationally by UK troops)
- Sherman IV – M4A3 with 75 mm M3 L/40 gun (no Sherman IVs used operationally) and Ford GAA V8 petrol engine
  - Sherman IVA – M4A3(76)W, Sherman IV with 76 mm M1A2 L/55 gun
  - Sherman IVB – M4A3(105), Sherman IV with 105 mm M4 L/22.5 howitzer
    - Sherman IVBY – M4A3(105) HVSS, Sherman IVB with HVSS
- Sherman V – M4A4 with 75 mm M3 L/40 gun and Chrysler A57 multibank 30-cylinder "cloverleaf" petrol engine in a longer rear hull with more widely spaced bogies
  - Sherman VC – Sherman V with 76.2 mm QF 17-pounder gun
- The term Sherman VI was not used. The "M4A5" was an American tested late production Ram Mk I cruiser tank. In British service it was named Tank Cruiser, Ram Mk I or Mk II.
- Sherman VII – M4A6 with 75 mm M3 L/40 gun, composite cast/welded hull and Ordnance RD-1820 9-cylinder radial diesel engine. Only 75 M4A6 were built and none are believed to have reached the UK
- Sherman II ARV III – M32B1 TRV (M4A1 Sherman II chassis) recovery vehicle
- Sherman V ARV III – M32B4 TRV (M4A4 Sherman V chassis) recovery vehicle. Extremely rare, almost mythical, vehicle. Production records are sketchy and British use is uncertain, but a photo does exist of an M32B4 in post-war Greek service

== Allied variants ==
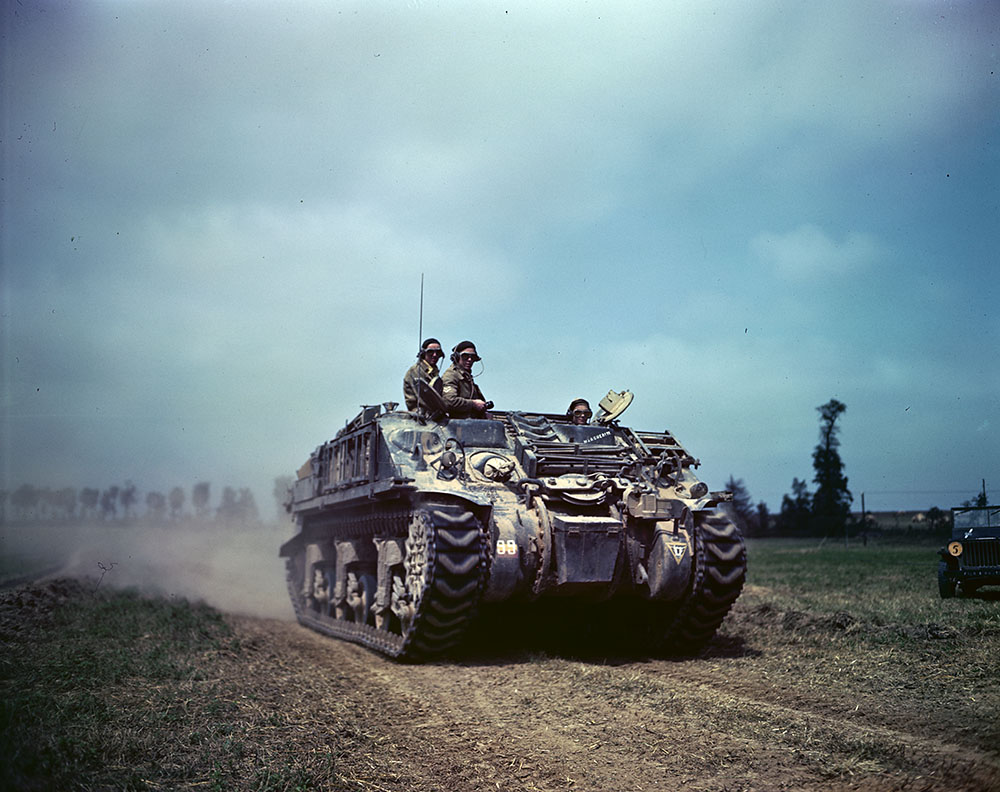
Sherman III ARV I – British Armoured Recovery Vehicle conversions of Sherman III (M4A2), REME, 79th Armoured Division, Summer 1944. Note large winch pulley on front glacis plate and specialized storage on hull sides.

Conversions and modifications of the M4 by their foreign users included the British-Commonwealth Firefly with the potent British QF 17 pounder (76.2 mm) anti-tank gun; Adder, Salamander, Crocodile, and Badger flame-throwing Shermans; Kangaroo armoured personnel carrier; Armoured recovery vehicles (ARV); artillery tractors, and the specialist military engineering vehicles of "Hobart's Funnies" designed specifically for Operation Overlord ("D-Day") and the Battle of Normandy. In 1945, the 1st Battalion Coldstream Guards at the Rhine fitted Sherman turrets with two "60 lb" RP-3 air-to-ground rockets on rails to create the Sherman Tulip. Canada created a prototype anti-aircraft vehicle with four 20 mm Polsten cannons mounted in a turret on Canadian-made M4A1 hull, which was called Skink. The Soviets reportedly replaced the US 75 mm gun on some M4A2s with the 76.2mm F-34 gun of the T-34 medium tank to create the M4M; they discontinued the practice when assured of US ammunition supply. A replacement with an 85 mm gun of an unspecified type was also considered, both with the retention of the original turret and with the installation of the T-34 turret. For the Normandy landings, the British developed special and specific deep wading kits for Shermans I/II, III and V. US forces in the Pacific suffered many drowned M4s by not having such kits early in the island landing campaigns, and they were rapidly copied for later landings.

=== Conversions ===
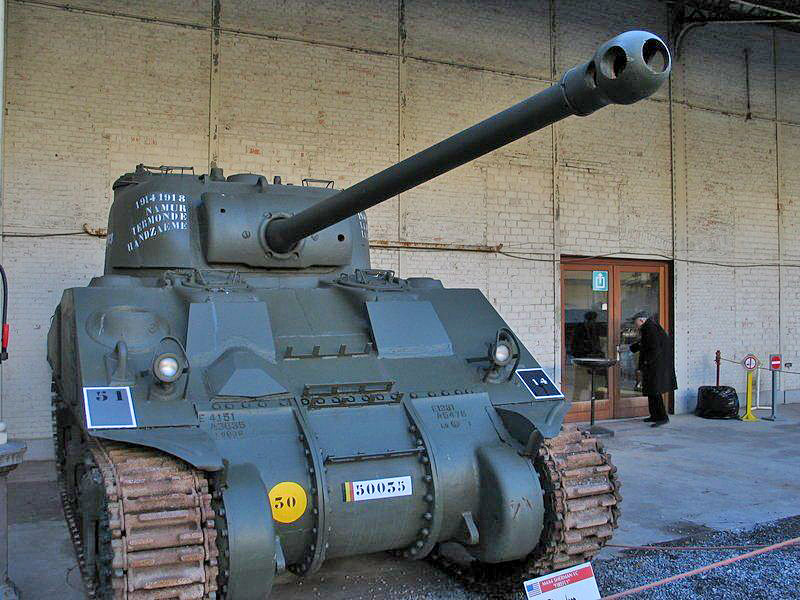
Sherman VC with British 17 pdr gun. Compare to 75 mm gun Sherman at the top of this page.

A number of Sherman tanks were converted to carry different armament or fill different roles than those for which the tank was originally manufactured. Among these were:

- Tank AA, 20 mm Quad, Skink – Canadian prototype anti-aircraft vehicle with four 20 mm Polsten cannon mounted in a turret on a Grizzly hull (tank made in Canada, not Lend-Leased).
- Sherman Duplex Drive (DD) – British-developed swimming gear fitted to British, Canadian, and US Shermans for the Normandy landings.
- Sherman 17pdr aka "Firefly" – British Sherman I or V re-armed with QF 17 pounder (76.2 mm) anti-tank gun with C added to designation (as in Sherman IC or VC). A few Sherman IIIC are believed to have existed, issued to units equipped with standard Sherman III for mechanical commonality: Aberdeen Proving Ground in the USA has one. Post-war the "Firefly" name is commonly used to refer to these vehicles, but it was not an official name and not commonly used during the war.
- Sherman Tulip – British Sherman with two 3-inch ("60lb") RP-3 rockets on rails added to the turret. Used by the 1st Coldstream Guards at the Rhine in 1945.
- RMASG "Control Tank" – Sherman V tanks allocated to the Royal Marines Armoured Support Group for the D-Day landings were fitted with a dial sight in a protruding square cover on the top right of the turret. This permitted them to be used accurately in the indirect fire role as self-propelled artillery, initially from the decks of landing craft but later also ashore. Direct fire sights were retained. These tanks can be identified in photos by the 360-degree compass bearing markings around the turret.

=== Combat engineering vehicles ===
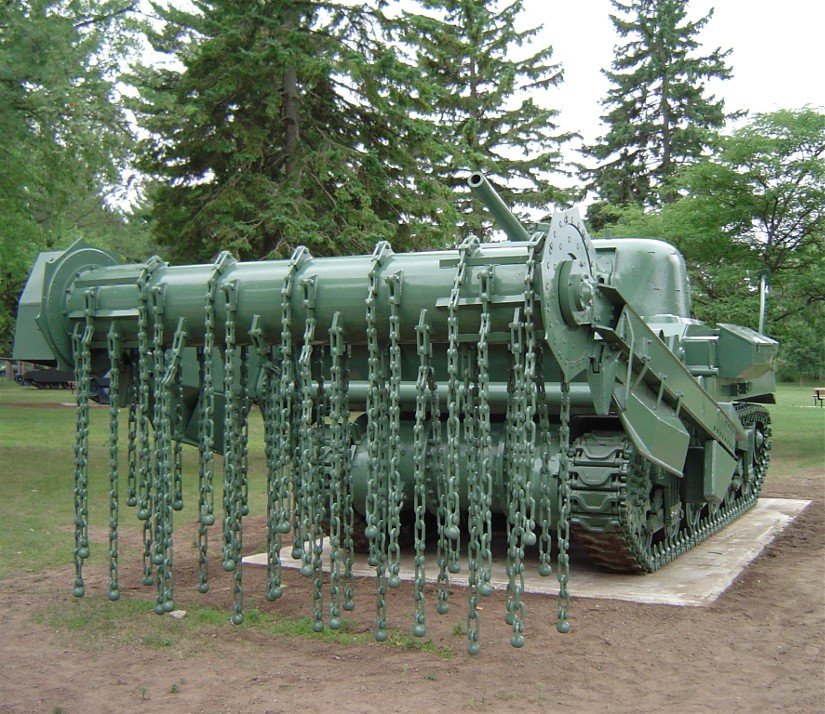
Sherman Crab Mk II.

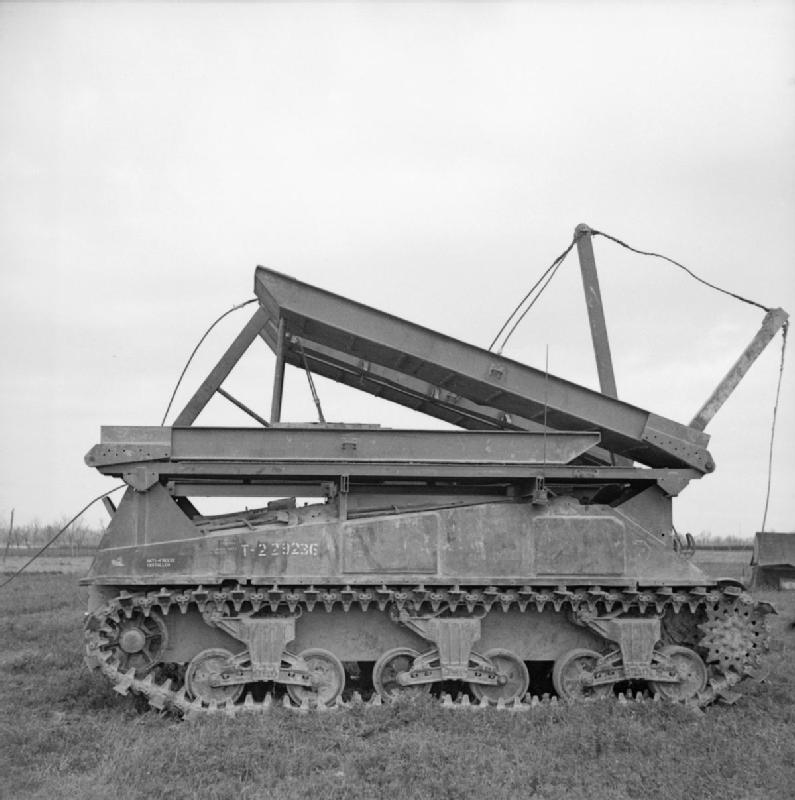
A Sherman Twaby Ark bridging vehicle, with the ramps stowed in the travelling position

– British developments for Shermans were extensive and included the fascine carrier (used by 79th Armoured Division), "Crib", "Twaby Ark", "Octopus",

- Sherman Bridgelayer –
  - "Plymouth" – carrying Bailey bridge
  - Sherman AVRE with Small Box Girder bridge
- Sherman CIRD – fitted with "Canadian Indestructible Roller Device" landmine exploder
- Sherman Crab – British Sherman with mine flail, one of a long line of flail devices

=== Recovery vehicles ===
- Sherman ARV I and Sherman ARV II – British armoured recovery vehicle conversions of Sherman I, III and V. It was British policy to have ARVs using the same mechanical parts as the gun tanks they supported wherever possible. ARV I was a simple turretless towing vehicle with light jib while ARV II had much more sophisticated recovery and repair equipment, a raised box-like superstructure and heavier jib. It was considered superior to the US M32 ARV, very few of which were used by British units.
- Beach Armoured Recovery Vehicle (BARV) – British conversion of Sherman III with large boat-shaped superstructure that was capable of deep wading near the shore. A simple push/pull ARV that served until replaced by Centurion BARV in the mid-1960s. The diesel-engined Sherman III was considered less likely to be affected by the wet environment than petrol-engined versions.

=== Artillery ===
- Sherman Gun Tractor – British field conversion in Italy by removing turrets from M4A2 Sherman III tanks to tow 17 pdr AT gun and carry crew with ammunition. Some of the removed 75mm M3 guns may have been used for the Churchill NA75 field conversions unique to the Italian campaign.
- Sherman Observation Post – an armoured mobile post for controlling artillery. The 75 mm gun was removed (with a dummy barrel fitted outside) to give room for map tables in the turret. Three radio sets were fitted (two Number 19 and a Number 18). Two more – both Number 38 – were carried for portable use outside the tank.

=== Personnel carriers ===
- Sherman Kangaroo – Canadian Sherman converted into "Kangaroo" armoured personnel carrier

=== Flame Tanks ===
- Sherman Adder – A conversion kit to equip Sherman tanks, used in India on Sherman III and Sherman V
- Sherman Badger – Canada's replacement of its Ram Badger, the Sherman Badger was a turretless M4A2 HVSS Sherman with Wasp IIC flamethrower in place of hull machine gun, developed sometime from 1945 to 1949. The 150 imp gal (680 L) at 250 psi (17 bar) was effective to 125 yd (114 m), with elevation of +30 to −10 degrees and traverse of 30 degrees left and 23 degrees right. This inspired the US T68.

== Service history ==
=== United Kingdom ===
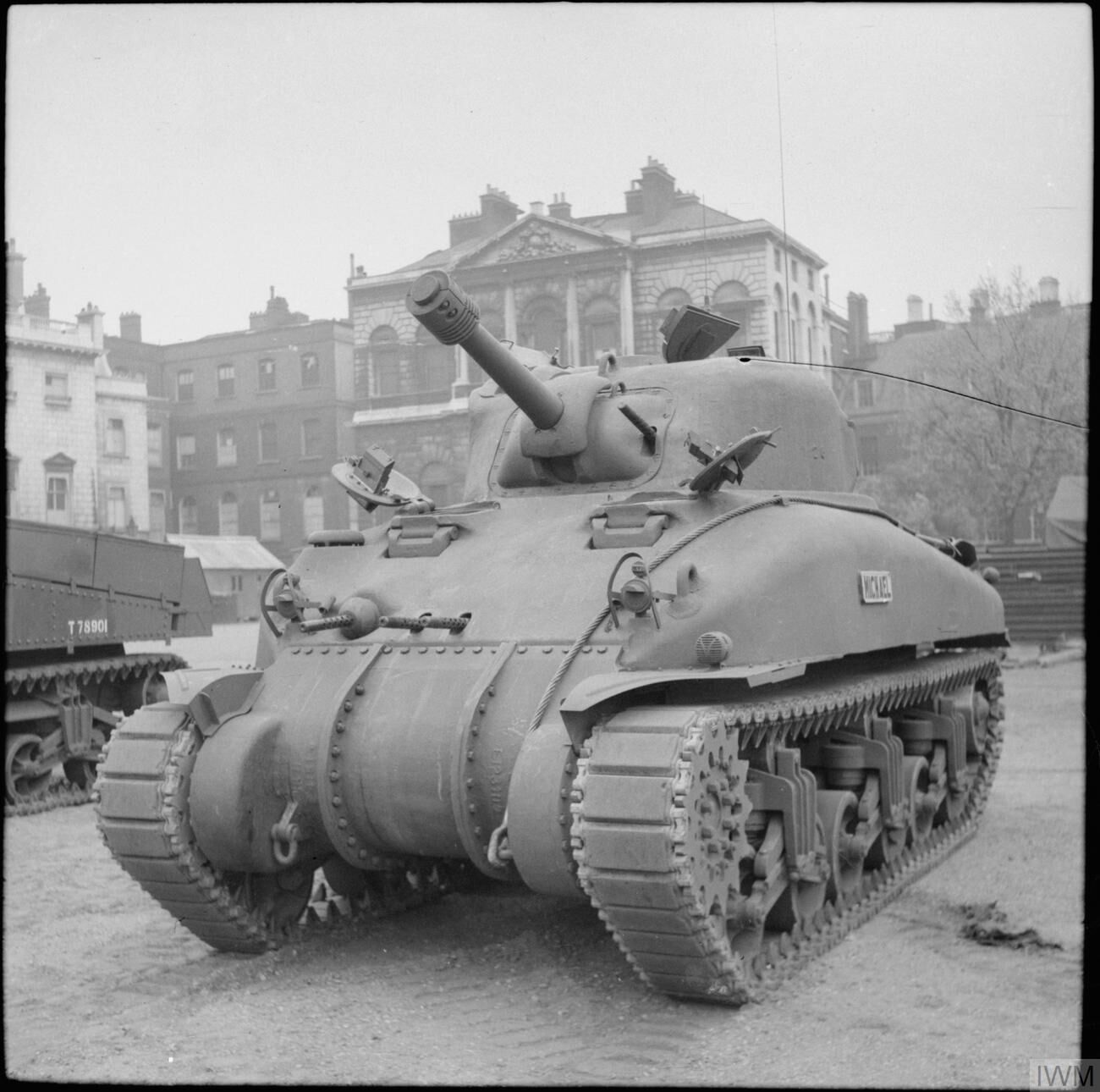
An early-model British Sherman II (M4A1) with two additional fixed mount machine-guns positioned in the front of the hull and its short M2 75mm tank gun with a supporting counterweight.

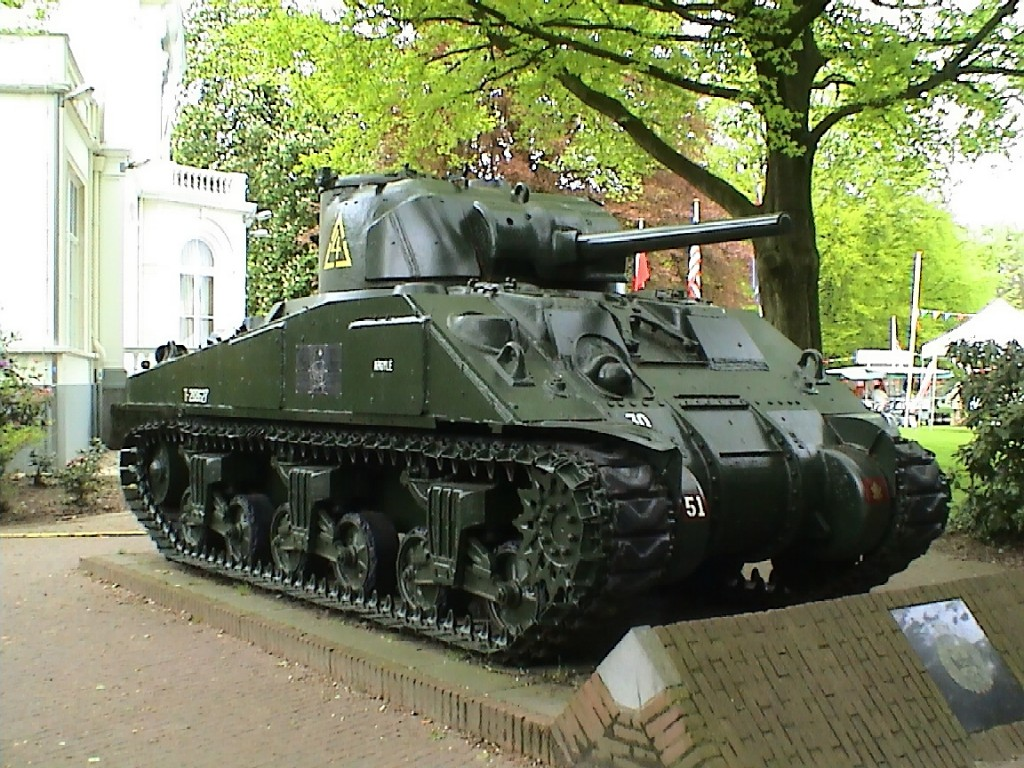
Most M4A4 Sherman Vs were provided to US allies under Lend-Lease, like this one in the markings of the 5th Canadian Division.

The British Empire received 17,184 Sherman tanks from the USA under Lend-Lease, roughly 78% of all American Shermans provided worldwide under this program. This includes Sherman tanks used by all members of the British Dominions and Empire and those Allies who were equipped by the UK, such as the Polish Armed Forces in the West. The first M4A1 Sherman II received by the UK was equipped with two driver-operated fixed mount machine-guns in the hull front and carried the shorter M2 75mm tank gun with a counterweight. The two extra hull machine-guns were a standard feature of very early Shermans, carried over from the previous M3 Medium (Lee/Grant) tank, and were one of the first elements to be discarded from the original plan. Bovington Tank Museum has an example of this build-standard, the very first Sherman tank supplied to the UK under Lend-Lease and named "Michael". The British became the primary users of the M4A4 Sherman V, which they found to be far more reliable than did the few US users (mainly for testing within the continental USA). M4 Sherman I, M4A1 Sherman II and M4A2 Sherman III were also used in (roughly) that order of importance. Free Polish and Czechoslovak government-in-exile armoured units supported and equipped by the British had M4A1s, M4A2s and some M4A4s.

Some Shermans in British service were also converted to specialist-type combat engineering vehicles. The Sherman Crab was the main conversion, which was designed to be used for clearing minefields in northwestern Europe and Italy. The Beach Armoured Recovery Vehicle was a waterproofed armoured recovery vehicle produced in small numbers and used only in support of beach-landings to pull drowned tanks and vehicles from the water and to push off stuck or beached landing-craft.

=== North Africa ===
The first Shermans to see battle in World War II were M4A1s (Sherman IIs) with the British Eighth Army at the Second Battle of El Alamein in October 1942. The tanks had been supplied in a hurry from the US, which had removed them from their own army units. They were then hastily modified to meet British military requirements and for desert and hot-weather conditions, such as the addition of sandshields over the tracks. Over 250 of these US-supplied Shermans, which were divided among 12 regiments, participated in the battle. They formed the so-called "heavy squadrons" (16 tanks in each) of one brigade in each division of X Corps and some other squadrons of the other units taking part in the battle, with the other heavy squadrons still being equipped with M3 Lee/Grant tanks and light squadrons possessing M3 Stuart light tanks and Crusader cruiser tanks. The British Shermans were able to tackle enemy rearguard units and defending troops by using high-explosive (HE) shells which were fired indirectly at them whilst the German 5 cm Pak 38 anti-tank gun was only effective against the Sherman if it could engage it from the more-vulnerable sides. More of the British armoured units in North Africa were converted to increasingly larger quantities of Shermans over time from their successful outcome at El Alamein, including the addition of Sherman IIIs (M4A2s) aside from the previous Sherman II, although the infantry tank units retained use of their Churchill tanks.

=== Italy ===
The British forces in Italy did not use their standard cruiser tanks (such as the Crusader). Instead, in their place, they used Shermans and turretless and regular gun-tank Stuart tanks to equip their reconnaissance troops. The other tank of the campaign was the Churchill tank (early models carried a 6-pdr tank gun; later models had a 75mm main gun), with such equipped tank units being bolstered with Shermans. In general, the Shermans acted in the infantry support role in difficult (mountainous and hilly) terrain against fixed-type German defences and fortifications. At the end of 1944, 76mm-, 105mm- (howitzer) and 17-pdr-armed Shermans began to be fielded by the British troops as they came up against the German-built and strongly-defended Gothic Line.

=== Northwest Europe ===
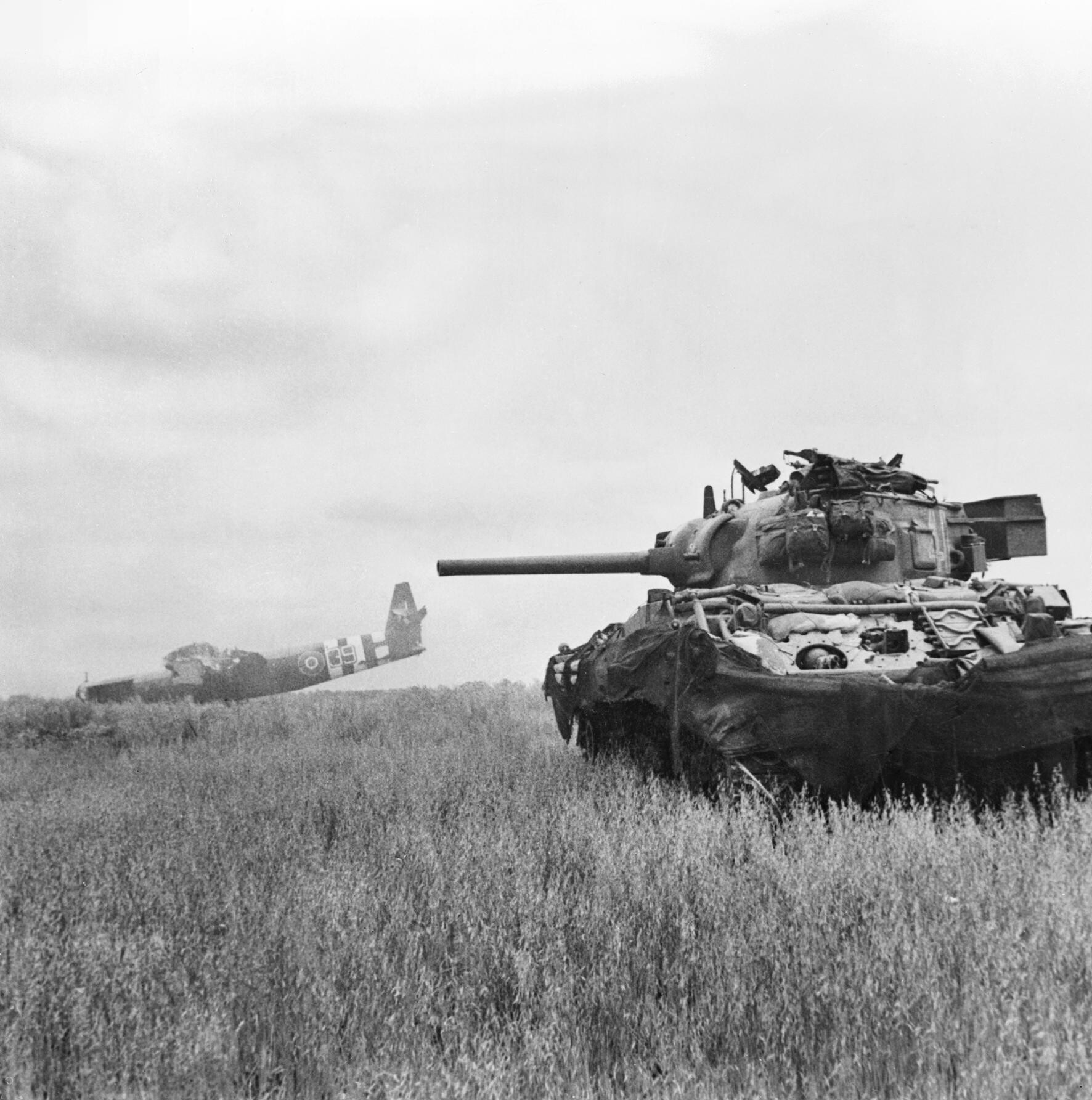
A Sherman DD tank of 13th/18th Royal Hussars in action against German troops near Ranville, Normandy, 10 June 1944. Note crashed Horsa glider in background.

British and Commonwealth use in Europe was comprehensive. The Sherman replaced the M3 Grant and Lee tanks and the Ram Tank in Canadian service and was in the majority by 1944 – the other main late-war tanks being the Churchill and Cromwell cruiser tank. The Cromwell was used largely in the reconnaissance role. The slower, more heavily armoured Churchills were used in the infantry support Tank Brigades.

The Sherman 17pdr variant was converted mostly from the M4 Sherman I and M4A4 Sherman V, with possibly a few Sherman III, and was used both in Sherman and Cromwell-equipped units to add extra anti-tank capability. The VC was necessary as the intended supplement (the 17 pdr development of the Cromwell was produced in insufficient numbers whilst the production of the VC was much greater). A 1944-pattern British armoured squadron (equivalent to a US company) had one 17pdr Sherman per troop (platoon) of four Shermans. The 17pdr Sherman was retained in Cromwell units until the introduction of the Comet, which carried the 77mm HV, a shortened derivative of the OQF 17 pounder firing the 17 pounder shell from the cartridge of the obsolete 3-inch 20cwt AA gun for less recoil but with slightly less armour penetration.

By the end of the war, 50% of the Shermans in British service were VCs or ICs. With the end of the war, and with superior tanks entering service, the UK returned its Shermans to reduce its Lend-Lease payments. However, the US did not really want the 17pdr conversions returned and many found their way from British stocks into other armies post-war, where they served until the 1960s in many cases (e.g. Argentine Repotenciado upgrade of IC and VC fitted with French 105mm gun and diesel engine).

=== India ===
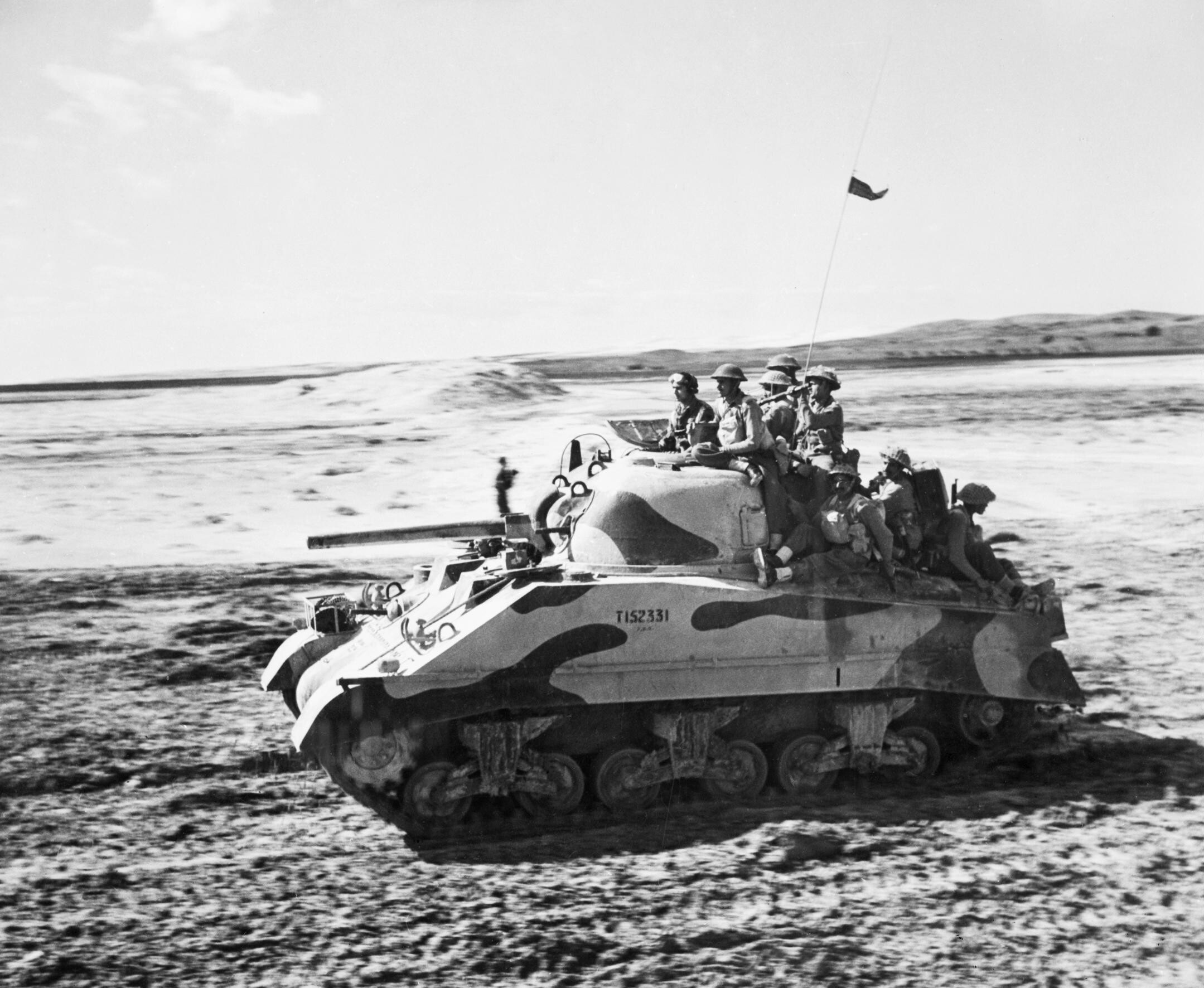
Indian Armoured Corps in a Sherman III tank in the Middle East, March 1944.

In the Indian Army tradition, formations included British regiments alongside Indian Army units. (Note: The Army of India consisted of both the Indian Army and the British Army in India between 1903 and 1947.) As well as some Indian units receiving Shermans, the 116th Regiment Royal Armoured Corps (converted from the 9th Battalion Gordon Highlanders) part of 255th Brigade was equipped with Shermans. As part of the 255th, they were involved in January and February 1945 in Burma in action near Meiktila and Mandalay. The actions were predominantly in support of infantry with few enemy tanks encountered. After that, they were part of mobile columns that moved to retake Rangoon.

=== New Zealand ===
The 4th New Zealand Armoured Brigade operated approximately 150 M4A2 Sherman tanks from late 1942 until the end of the war. The 4th Brigade formed part of the New Zealand 2nd Division and was converted from an infantry brigade. The 4th Armoured Brigade saw action during the Italian Campaign.

=== Australia ===
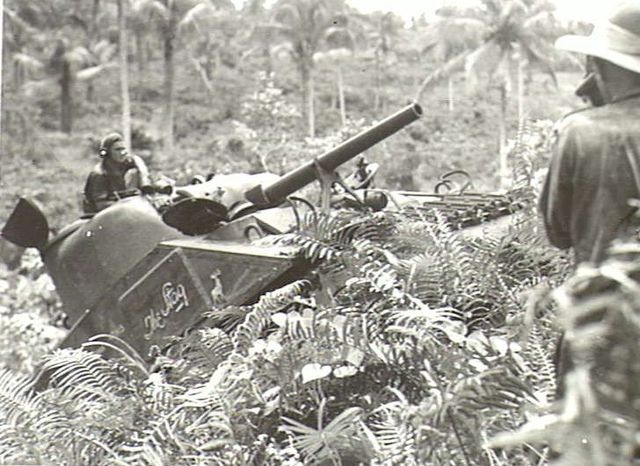
A M4A2 during Australian Army trials in 1944

Although the Australian Army received 757 M3 Lee/Grants in 1942, it only received three Sherman tanks. These three tanks were supplied by the UK and were only used for trials purposes. When the Australian Cruiser tank program was cancelled in 1943, after US authorities promised M4 Mediums would be available in any quantity required by Australia. A proposal was made to replace the entire order of 775 Australian Cruiser tanks with 310 Sherman tanks; however, this proposal was not acted on. Early in 1944 Australian Army was requested by War Office to undertake trials of Churchill and Sherman tanks in "New Guinea conditions". Trials were conducted in the jungle terrain of New Guinea using British Churchill Mk IV, Mk V and Mk VII Infantry tanks and American Sherman M4A1 and M4A2 Medium tanks, and included armament tests involving firing 75mm and 95mm main guns on a Japanese style bunker constructed from coconut logs. It was considered by those trials results that the Churchill was preferable to the Sherman for operations in jungle.

Australia's first Sherman, an M4A2, arrived in Australia in 1943 with a further two M4s (sometimes mis-labelled as M4A1s) arriving for tropical trials in New Guinea in 1944. The tanks were manned by crews drawn from the Australian 4th Armoured Brigade. The results of these trials showed that the British Churchill tank was better suited to jungle warfare's low-speed infantry support than the Sherman. As a result, the Australian Government ordered 510 Churchills, of which 51 were delivered before the order was cancelled at the end of the war, and did not order any further Shermans. Following the war, the three trials tanks were placed on display at Australian Army bases and one was later destroyed after being used as a tank target.

=== Canada ===
The United States officially did not list Canada as a Lend-Lease recipient, but did create the 1941 Joint Defense Production Committee with Canada so that "each country should provide the other with the defense articles which it is best able to produce" and American Locomotive Company enabled its Canadian subsidiary, the Montreal Locomotive Works, to build M4A1 variants in Canada. Canada received four Shermans under Lend-Lease; the mechanism of this is not fully understood. The MLW built 188 Shermans called the Grizzly I cruiser in Canadian service, which were restricted to training. As there was sufficient production capacity in the US, the MLW investment in Ram and Sherman tank production was turned to building of the Sexton self-propelled guns which used the 25pdr gun-howitzer on M3 or M4 chassis. In European combat, the Canadian Army used American-built Shermans supplied by the UK. These were armed with 75 mm, 105 mm and 17-pounder guns.

=== China ===
Chinese forces based in British India received 100 M4A4 Shermans from British stocks and used them to great effect against considerably-inferior Japanese tanks and their infantry in the subsequent offensives, such as in Battle of Northern Burma and Western Yunnan, between 1943 and 1944. An estimated 812 Shermans were provided under Lend-Lease. After the war, some vehicles remaining in India went to the British, with several others put to use by the Nationalist Chinese (Kuomintang or KMT) against Chinese communist forces in the Chinese Civil War until the KMT's defeat in 1949.

=== Soviet Union ===
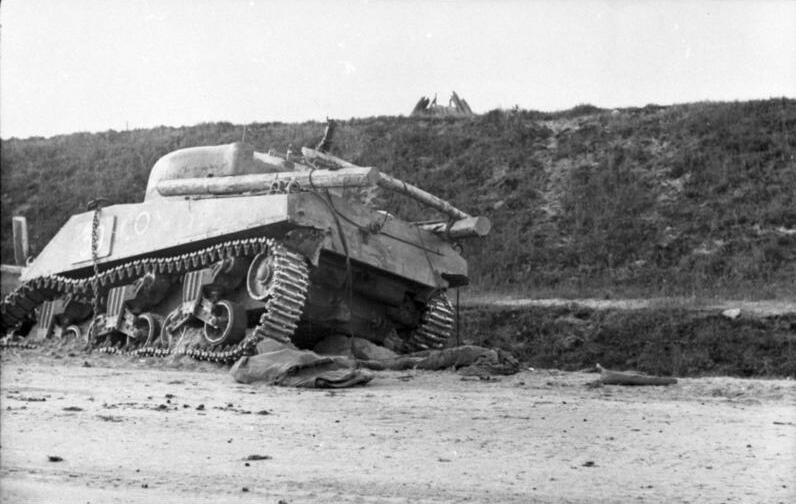
An abandoned Soviet M4A2 (75mm-gun version) left behind near Smolensk, just before the start of Operation Bagration in 1944.

The M4A2s used by the Red Army were considered to be much-less prone to blow up due to ammunition detonation than their T-34/76 but had a higher tendency to overturn in road accidents and collisions or because of rough terrain due to their much-higher center of gravity.

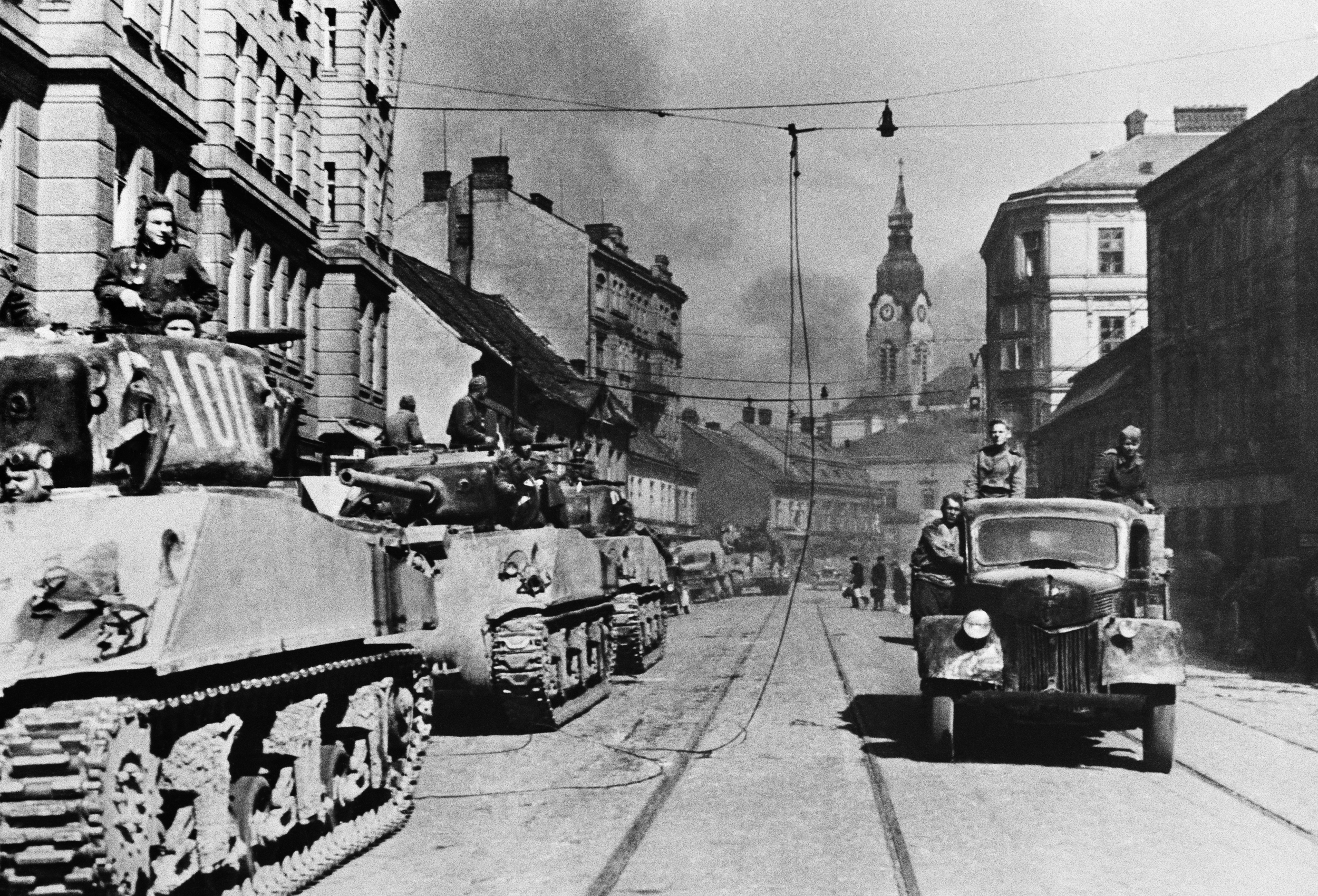
Soviet M4A2(76)W Shermans lined up on the side of a street in the Czech city of Brno in April 1945.

Under Lend-Lease, 4,102 M4A2 medium tanks were sent to the Soviet Union. Of these, 2,007 were equipped with the original 75 mm main gun, with 2,095 mounting the more-capable 76 mm tank gun. The total number of Sherman tanks sent to the U.S.S.R. under Lend-Lease represented 18.6% of all Lend-Lease Shermans.

The first 76mm-armed M4A2 diesel-fuel Shermans started to arrive in Soviet Union in the late summer of 1944. By 1945, some Red Army armoured units were standardized to depend primarily on them and not on their ubiquitous T-34. Such units include the 1st Guards Mechanized Corps, the 3rd Guards Mechanized Corps, 6th Guards Tank Army and the 9th Guards Mechanized Corps, amongst others. The Sherman was largely held in good regard and viewed positively by many Soviet tank-crews which operated it before, with compliments mainly given to its reliability, ease of maintenance, generally good firepower (referring especially to the 76mm-gun version) and decent armour protection, as well as an auxiliary power unit (APU) to keep the tank's batteries charged without having to run the main engine for the same purpose as the Soviets' own T-34 tank required.

=== Poland ===
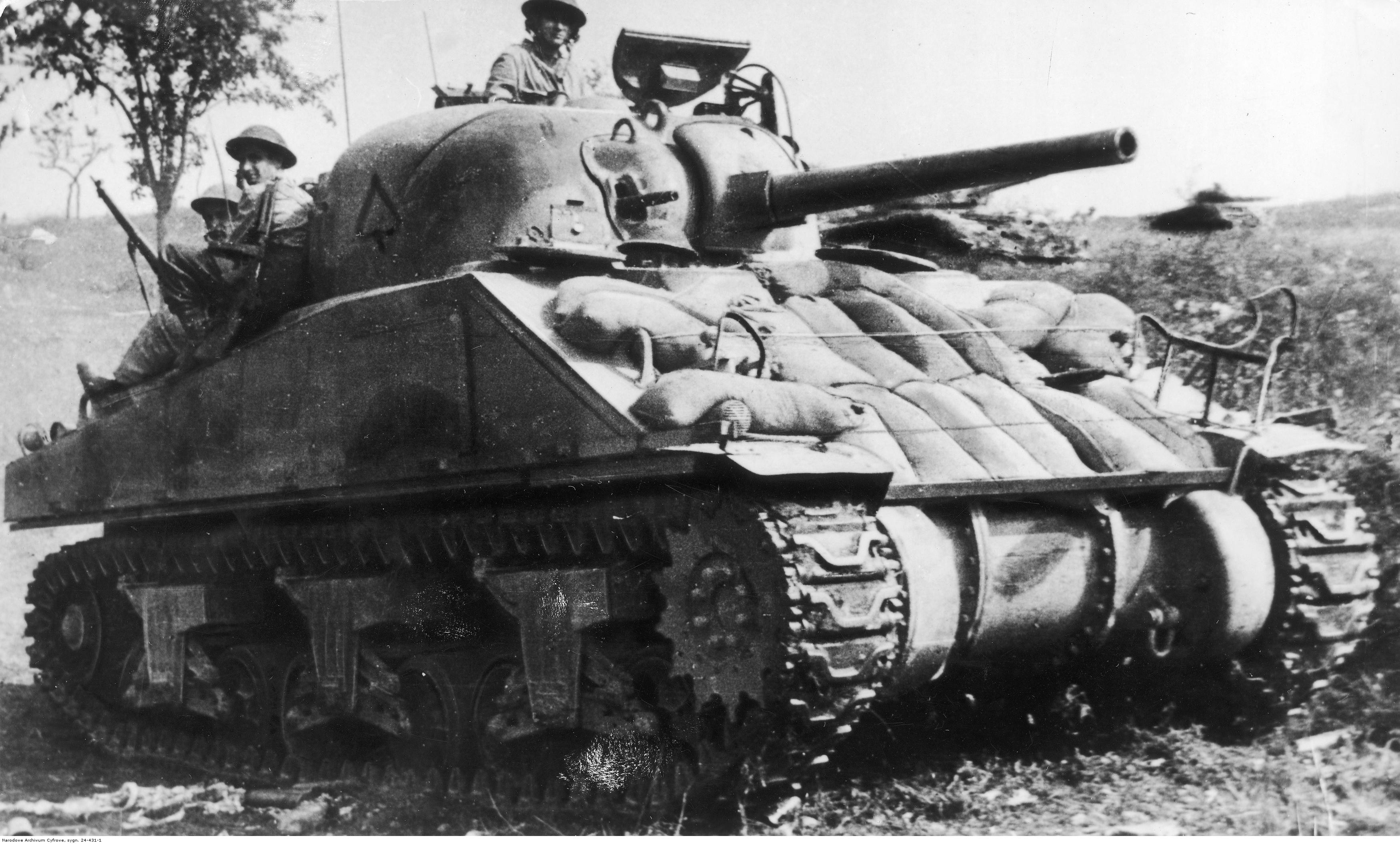
M4 Sherman tank under the command of Lieutenant Edward Budzianowski during the Battle of Monte Cassino

Poland was not a recipient of Lend-Lease aid directly from the United States. However, Polish forces also used a wide variety of Shermans redirected from Lend-Lease shipments to the British Empire. The Polish 1st Armoured Division entered the Battle of Normandy mostly equipped with Sherman Vs (M4A4s) with 75 mm guns, and VC Shermans. The reconnaissance battalion was equipped with Cromwells, as in British armoured divisions. (Note: With the 10th Mounted Rifle Regiment.) After heavy losses closing the Falaise Pocket and in the Dutch campaign, the division was re-equipped, largely with Sherman IIA (M4A1 (W) 76 mm) models.

The Polish II Corps, fighting in Italy, primarily used M4A2s (Sherman III) that had been used by the British Army in Africa. However, some ICs and Sherman IB (M4(105 mm)) howitzer tanks were also used.

Parts of the Polish First Army also briefly used M4A2s (76 mm) borrowed from the Soviet armies after heavy losses in the conquest of Danzig. After receiving replacements, the army was re-equipped with T-34s.

=== France ===
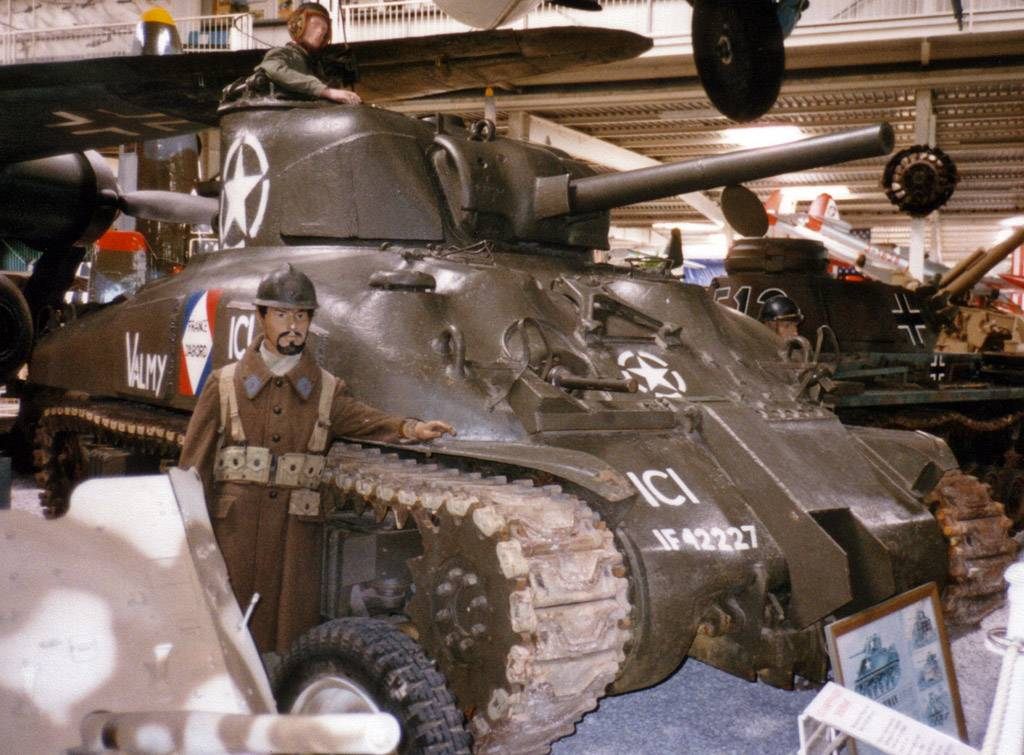
M4A1 in French markings with national (Free French) diamond symbol on hull side

The first use of Sherman tanks by a French unit appears to have been with 1ère Compagnie Autonome de Chars de Combat (1ère CACC), it was merged with the French Army Corps Reconnaissance Group (GRCA), and was known as the "Free French Flying Column". It was part of the British Eighth Army, and fought from El-Alamein to Tunisia. The tank company was attached to "Force L (Leclerc)" and later became the 1st Company of the newly organized 501ème Régiment de Chars de Combat, 2ème Division Blindée.

In 1943, the Free French Forces decided to create their new army in North Africa, and had an agreement with the Americans to be equipped with modern US weapons. France received 656 Sherman tanks under Lend-Lease (274 M4A4s and 362 M4A2s, plus 20 remanufactured M4A2s), being the third largest recipient of the Sherman. French armoured divisions were organized and equipped the same as the U.S. Army's "light" armoured division table of organization and equipment of 1943. Each division was equipped with 165 Shermans.The French 2nd Armored Division (French: Division Blindée, DB) entered the Battle of Normandy fully equipped with M4A2s. The 1ème and 5ème DB, which entered southern France as part of the First French Army, were equipped with a mixture of M4A2 and M4A4 medium tanks. M4A3(76) and M4A3(75)W tanks were later received from U.S. Army stocks as replacements to make up for losses in combat, and the French were also issued M4A3 (105) Shermans; the 2ème DB received a few M4(105)s at the end of July 1944 while still in the UK. The 3ème DB, which served as a training and reserve organization for the three operational armored divisions, was equipped with roughly 200 medium and light tanks. Of these, 120 were later turned in to the US Army's Delta Base Section at Marseille for reissue. In the final weeks of the War in Europe, French units also received supplies of M4A1(75)s, remanufactured in the US before shipment overseas.

=== Brazil ===
Brazil received 53 Sherman tanks under Lend-Lease in 1944, all equipped with the 75 mm gun. These tanks were not used by the Brazilian Expeditionary Force in Italy during the war, but sent directly to defend Brazil itself. In the early 1950s, another group of 30 Sherman tanks was delivered under the Military Assistance Program, bringing the total number of Shermans to 83 tanks. The variants of these tanks consisted of 40 M4, 38 M4 with the Composite Hull, and 2 M4A1. The Brazilian Army used the Shermans until 1979 when they were replaced by M41 tanks.

=== Czechoslovakia ===
While the Czechoslovak government-in-exile did not receive Lend-lease equipment from the United States, its 1st Czechoslovak Armoured Brigade was equipped and supplied by the British Army. The brigade's equipment during the siege of Dunkirk included 36 Sherman ICs in addition to Cromwell tanks, which constituted the primary armoured vehicle operated by the brigade. The 17 pdr Shermans were, in May 1945, exchanged for 22 Challenger cruiser tanks with which the brigade returned home. In addition, one damaged Sherman I abandoned by an unknown unit was salvaged from the battlefield by the brigade's repair shop and was later used as a recovery vehicle. This vehicle returned with the brigade to Czechoslovakia.

=== South Africa ===
South African Shermans were used by the 6th Armoured Division.

== See also ==
- Postwar Sherman tanks
- Hobart's Funnies
- 79th Armoured Division
- Allied technological cooperation during World War II

== Sources ==
- Zaloga, Steven J.; Grandsen, James (1984). Soviet Tanks and Combat Vehicles of World War Two. London: Arms and Armour Press. ISBN 0-85368-606-8.
- Sandars, John (1982). The Sherman Tank in British service 1942-1945. Vanguard No. 15. Oxford: Osprey Publishing. ISBN 0-85045-361-5.
- Hunnicutt, R. P (1978) [1971]. Sherman: A History of the American Medium Tank. San Rafeal: Taurus Enterprises. ISBN 978-0-89141-080-5.
- mapleleafup.org
- Tanks!
- "Canada in the Second World War". Archived from the original on 17 June 2006.
- United States Government Manual (PDF). Office for Emergency Management. Spring 1942. Archived from the original (PDF) on 11 August 2002 – via University of Minnesota Library.
- "M4 Sherman" (in Danish). ww2photo.mimerswell.com. Archived from the original on 28 February 2007.
