= 9th Guards Motor Rifle Division =

Motor rifle division of the Soviet military

22nd Tank Corps (1942) 5th Mechanized Corps (1942–1944) 9th Guards Mechanized Corps (1944–1945) 9th Guards Mechanized Division (1945–1957) 9th Guards Motor Rifle Division (1957–1958)
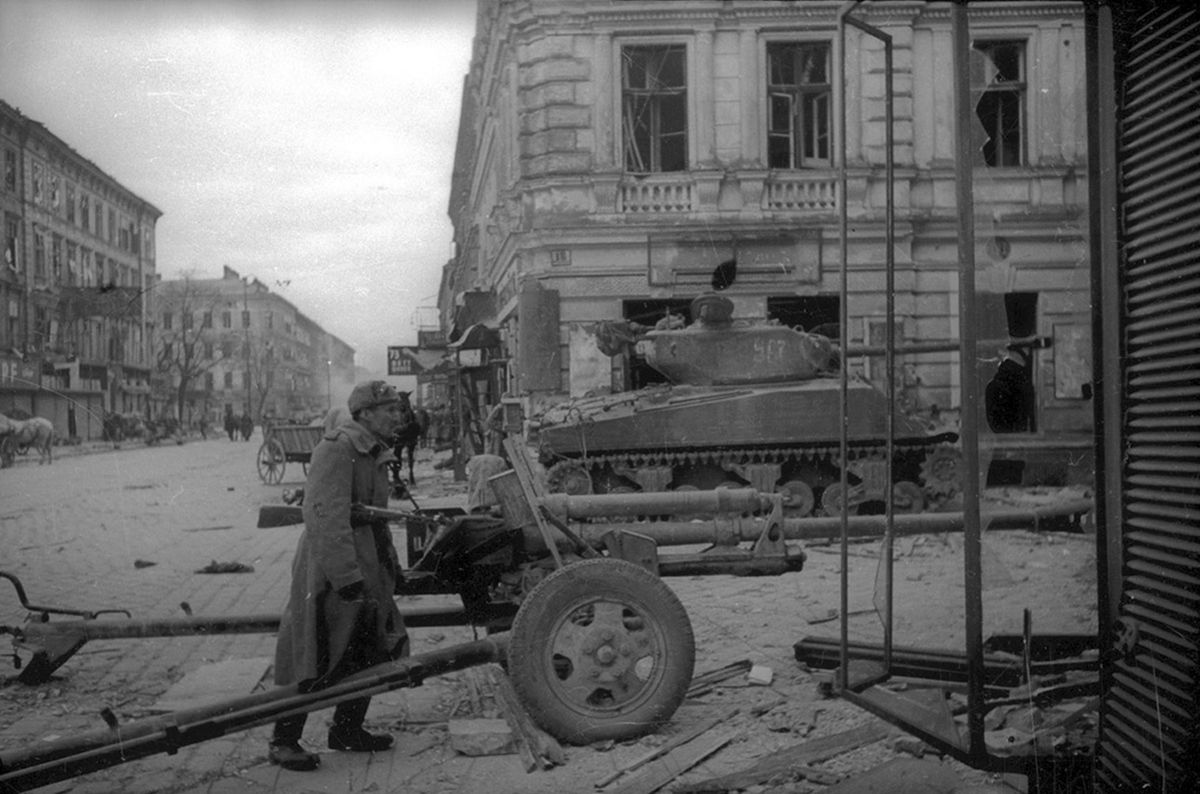
- A 76 mm ZiS-3 gun and an M4A2(76) Sherman of the corps' 46th Guards Tank Brigade on a street in Vienna during the Vienna Offensive
- Active: 1942–1958
- Country: Soviet Union
- Branch: Soviet Ground Forces
- Type: Mechanized infantry
- Role: Armored warfare
- Size: Division, Mechanized Corps
- Engagements: World War II; Cold War
- Decorations: Order of the Red Banner; Order of Suvorov
- Battle honours: Dniester; Rymnik

The 9th Guards Dniester-Rymnik Red Banner Order of Kutuzov Motor Rifle Division was a Soviet Army unit initially formed as a tank corps in April 1942. In the same year, it was then formed as a mechanized corps in November 1942. This unit then became a Guards mechanized corps in September 1944. Following World War II, the corps were reorganized as a mechanized division in 1945 and then a motor rifle division in 1957 before being disbanded in 1958.

== History ==
=== World War II ===
The unit formed as the 22nd Tank Corps on 3 April 1942 and was subordinated to the 38th and 4th Tank Armies of the Southwestern and Stalingrad Fronts. In September 1942, following heavy losses around Kalach, the corps moved into the Reserve of the Supreme High Command (Stavka reserve) and was reorganized as the second instance (formation) of the 5th Mechanized Corps. During 1943, the 5th Mechanized Corps was mainly assigned as a Stavka reserve asset or as a reserve of the Western Front. The corps was assigned to the 6th Tank Army in February 1944 and achieved Guards status on 12 September 1944, being retitled as the 9th Guards Mechanized Corps. As such, the corps remained with the 6th Guards Tank Army for the remainder of the war in Europe, and was then transferred with its parent army to the far east, seeing action against Japanese forces under the direction of the Transbaikal Front.

The corps was in combat near Kalach in 1942, Smolensk and Lenino in 1943, Korsun and Iasi-Kishinev in 1944, and at Budapest and Vienna in 1945, as well as fighting in the Manchurian Operation in September 1945.

The 9th Guards Mechanized Corps was notable for its use of U.S. Lend-Lease M4A2-76 diesel-engined Sherman tanks during 1944-45.

=== Postwar ===
In October 1945, the corps, like all Soviet mechanized corps, was reorganized into a division, the 9th Guards Mechanized Division. It was stationed at Yasnaya, part of the Transbaikal Military District's 6th Guards Tank Army. The division included the 18th, 30th, and 31st Guards Mechanized Regiments, and the 46th and 111th Guards Tank Regiments. On 4 June 1957, the division became the 9th Guards Motor Rifle Division at Sainshand, Mongolia. The division was disbanded on 1 November 1958.

== Commanders ==
- General-mayor Mikhail Vasilyevich Volkov (2 November 1942–9 January 1948, promoted general-leytenant 5 November 1943)
- General-mayor Nikolay Vasilyevich Petrushin (14 March 1948–12 April 1952)
- Colonel Vasily Ivanovich Zaytsev (12 April 1952–30 September 1956, promoted general-mayor 31 May 1954)
- Colonel Yevgeny Denisovich Gaydayenko (14 November 1956–1 November 1958)
