= Grigory Kabakovsky =

Grigory Samoylovich Kabakovsky
- Григорий Самойлович Кабаковский
- Born: 2 October 1909; Kochubeivka, Poltavsky Uyezd, Poltava Governorate, Russian Empire
- Died: 2 November 1959 (aged 50); Chutove Raion, Poltava Oblast, Ukrainian SSR, Soviet Union
- Military career
- Allegiance: Soviet Union
- Branch: Red Army
- Service years: 1941–1945
- Rank: Lieutenant
- Units: 57th Guards Tank Brigade, 7th Guards Mechanized Corps
- Conflicts: World War II; Battle of the Dnieper
- Awards: Hero of the Soviet Union

Grigory Samoylovich Kabakovsky (Russian: Григорий Самойлович Кабаковский; 2 October 1909 – 2 November 1959) was a Ukrainian Red Army lieutenant and Hero of the Soviet Union. Kabakovsky was awarded the title for leading his company during the Battle of the Dnieper in September 1943, where he reportedly killed 60 German soldiers.

== Early life ==
Kabakovsky was born on 2 October 1909 in the village of Kuchubeivka in Poltava Governorate to a peasant family. He graduated from primary school. Kabakovsky worked as a mechanic in a sugar factory in Artemivka village. In 1938, he joined the Communist Party of the Soviet Union. From 1940, he headed the trade department of the Opishnya Executive Committee.

== World War II ==
Kabakovsky was drafted into the Red Army in 1941 and sent to the front. He fought on the Southwestern Front, Northwestern Front, Central Front and Kalinin Front. Kabakovsky was seriously wounded twice. Near Dnipropetrovsk in late 1941, he reportedly took command after his company commander was wounded, and led five counterattacks. He was with the 33rd Tank Brigade (later 57th Guards Tank Brigade) from its formation and fought near Moscow. Kabakovsky, then a senior sergeant commanding a gun in the brigade's motor rifle battalion, first distinguished himself in the opening stages of the Battle of Moscow in late November 1941, receiving the Order of the Red Banner on 17 January 1942 for his actions. The award recommendation read:

Comrade Kabakovsky and his crew, during combat operations in the Novo–Petrovskoye and Antonovka region on 19 and 20 November 1941, destroyed two German tanks, and knocked out one German tank in the region of Filatovo on 24 November 1941. In this battle his gun was disabled. Despite the fact that the enemy tanks were already three to four hundred meters away and a hurricane of artillery and machine gun fire, Comrade Kabakovsky managed to withdraw the gun from its firing position and preserve its crew whole. For his courage and heroism, Comrade Kabakovsky is deserving of the state award of the Order of the Red Banner.

In the fall of 1943 Kabakovsky was a lieutenant and company commander in the motor rifle battalion of the 57th Guards Tank Brigade of the 7th Guards Mechanized Corps. When the company reached the Desna River, he reportedly organized the crossing. The Dnieper was reached by 25 September. The company led by Kabakovsky crossed the river north of Kiev. With grenades, rifle fire and a machine gun, Kabakovsky reportedly killed 60 German soldiers in the battle to hold the bridgehead. In pursuit of retreating German troops, the company reportedly advanced to the northern outskirts of Domantovo, Chernobyl Raion, reportedly killing about 50 German soldiers. The German forces counterattacked but were reportedly repulsed three times. While repulsing a counterattack, Kabakovsky was seriously wounded on 27 September but continued to command. On 17 October 1943 he was awarded the title Hero of the Soviet Union and the Order of Lenin for his actions. The award recommendation read:

Comrade Kabakovsky first organized his company's crossing of the Desna and Dnieper on fishing boats. On reaching the right bank of the Dnieper, he was first to burst into the enemy trench on Hill 118.1, destroying up to sixty Fascists, putting them to flight, and pursuing them for three kilometers. He burst into the enemy strongpoint of Domantovo, and in fire and hand-to-hand combat destroyed up to fifty soldiers and officers, driving the enemy from the northern outskirts and organizing the defense until the main forces of the brigade crossed the Dnieper, repulsed three enemy counterattacks with his company but did not fall back from the captured line. Being heavily wounded in the chest, Comrade Kabakovsky continued to lead the battle. The heroic actions of Comrade Kabakovsky during the capture of the fortified heights and northern outskirts of Domantovo ensued the crossing of the main forces across the Dnieper without losses. For valor and heroism displayed in the battles on the right bank of the Dnieper, Comrade Kabakovsky is deserving of the highest state award: Hero of the Soviet Union.

== Postwar ==
After the war Kabakovsky returned to Chutove Raion. He became a collective farm chairman and chairman of the Pogrebky MTS. In 1946 he became a deputy of the Supreme Soviet of the Soviet Union at its Second Convocation. Kabakovsky died on 2 November 1959 and was buried in the village of Artemivka in Chutove Raion.
