= Mikhail Petrov (general) =

Red Army major general, Hero of the Soviet Union

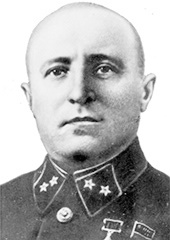
- Native name: Михаил Петрович Петров
- Born: 15 January 1898; Zalustezhye, Gdovsky Uyezd, Saint Petersburg Governorate, Russian Empire
- Died: October/November 1941 (aged 43) Karachevsky District, Oryol Oblast, RSFSR, Soviet Union
- Allegiance: Soviet Union
- Branch: Red Army
- Service years: 1918–1941
- Rank: Major general
- Commands: 5th Mechanized Corps; 17th Mechanized Corps; 20th Rifle Corps; 50th Army; Bryansk Front
- Conflicts: Russian Revolution; October Revolution; Russian Civil War; Spanish Civil War; World War II; Soviet invasion of Poland; Operation Barbarossa; Battle of Białystok–Minsk; Battle of Moscow; Bryansk Pocket (DOW)
- Awards: Hero of the Soviet Union; Order of Lenin; Order of the Red Star

Mikhail Petrovich Petrov (Russian: Михаил Петрович Петров; 15 January 1898 – October/November 1941) (Note: See Death section.) was a Red Army major general and a Hero of the Soviet Union. Born to a peasant family, he moved to Petrograd and became a metalworker at the Putilov Plant, where he became a Red Guard squad leader and fought in the storming of the Winter Palace. He joined the Red Army and fought in the Russian Civil War. During the interwar period Petrov became an armored corps officer and fought as a tank battalion commander during the Spanish Civil War. For his leadership, he received the title Hero of the Soviet Union on 21 June 1937.

Petrov returned to the Soviet Union and became a tank corps commander, which he led in the Soviet invasion of Poland. He led a mechanized corps in the initial stages of Operation Barbarossa and became commander of the 50th Army in August 1941. He became commander of the Bryansk Front in October 1941 and was fatally wounded during the breakout from the Bryansk Pocket.

== Early life and Russian Civil War ==
Petrov was born to a peasant family on 15 January 1898 in Zalustezhye, part of the Saint Petersburg Governorate. From a young age, he worked as a stove fitter alongside his father. After graduating from the fourth grade, he moved to Petrograd and worked as a metalworker at the Putilov Plant in Petrograd and as a chauffeur. There he came into contact with the Bolsheviks. In March 1917, he became a squad leader of the 2nd Petrograd Red Guard Detachment. Petrov participated in the storming of the Winter Palace during the October Revolution. He joined the Red Army in 1918 and fought in the Russian Civil War. In 1920, he became a member of the Communist Party of the Soviet Union.

== Interwar years ==
Around 1920, Petrov was transferred to Central Asia and fought in the suppression of the Basmachi movement, a Muslim uprising against Russian and Soviet rule. He later fought against insurgents in the Caucasus before being sent to the Tambov Infantry School, from which he graduated in 1923. While at the school, he participated in the suppression of the Tambov Rebellion. He graduated from the Transcaucasian Political School in 1925. In 1932, he graduated from the armored commanders refresher courses. Petrov served as the commander of a training battalion in the 1st Mechanized Brigade, before fighting in the Spanish Civil War, serving as a battalion commander in Dmitry Pavlov's tank brigade from October 1936 to June 1937. He was awarded the Order of the Red Star on 2 January 1937. On 21 June he was awarded the title Hero of the Soviet Union and the Order of Lenin for his leadership. Returning to the Soviet Union, he held appointments as a battalion commander and then as a tank brigade commander. In 1937, he became commander of a tank division. In June of that year, he became commander of the 5th Mechanized Corps.

Petrov also became a deputy of the Supreme Soviet of the Soviet Union at its first convocation. In 1938, the corps was converted into the 15th Tank Corps. He participated in the Soviet invasion of Poland in September 1939, during which he led the corps in the Battle of Grodno. During the invasion, the corps was resupplied with fuel by parachute. On 4 June 1940, he was promoted to major general. In July 1940 he became deputy commander of the 6th Mechanized Corps. In October he became inspector of armor for the Western Special Military District. In 1941, Petrov graduated from higher academic courses at the Military Academy of the General Staff. On 11 March 1941, he was appointed commander of the 17th Mechanized Corps, which was stationed near Slonim. The 17th Mechanized Corps was a cadre-strength formation equipped with only 36 tanks.

== World War II ==
Following the German invasion of the Soviet Union on 22 June 1941, Petrov's corps fought in the Battle of Białystok–Minsk. The corps was initially stationed in the rear but was moved forward to Baranovichi to stop the German advance, after the initial German breakthrough. On 26 June it fought defensive battles around Baranovichi, Stowbtsy, and Minsk, but the XLVII Army Corps (Motorized) managed to penetrate the corps' defenses. Outnumbered, the 17th Mechanized Corps was unable to offer much resistance to the attack and its remnants retreated eastwards to the Berezina, where they linked up with other Soviet units. It suffered heavy losses in the fighting and on 5 July became part of the 21st Army after being ordered to move to Babruysk on the previous day. By 7 July the corps had no armored vehicles left and later in the month the corps was withdrawn to the Sukhinichi area with the 4th Army. It was then converted into the 147th Tank Brigade on 1 August.

In early August 1941, Petrov was appointed commander of the 20th Rifle Corps in the Gomel area. On 16 August, he became commander of the new 50th Army of the Bryansk Front as a result of a Stavka directive on 14 August. The 50th Army defended the Bryansk and Kaluga approaches, and conducted unsuccessful counterattacks against a German bridgehead on the Desna River. The army's sector was relatively calm during September and around this time the 50th Army headquarters was visited by journalist Vasily Grossman. In early October, the army was surrounded during the Orel-Bryansk Defensive Operation, in an area known as the Bryansk Pocket. On 7 October, while trapped in the pocket with his troops, Petrov became commander of the Bryansk Front after front commander Andrey Yeryomenko was mistakenly reported killed.

=== Death ===
There are differing accounts of Petrov's death. According to Aleksander Maslov, he was seriously wounded attempting to break out of the pocket and died on 10 October 1941. John Erickson states that he was wounded during the breakout and was hidden by his soldiers in a woodcutter's hut near Karachev, where he died of gangrene on 13 October. In 1956, Petrov's son, Alexander Petrov, investigated the circumstances of his death. Alexander concluded that his father had been shot through both hips during the breakout, taken to the village of Golynka and hidden in the house of the Novokreshchenovy family. By this time Petrov was suffering from gangrene and could not be moved. Novokreshchenov's wife reportedly threw an old coat over him when German troops searched the house, claiming he was her husband. Another group of Soviet soldiers moved him 7 kilometers (4.3 mi) to an isolated cabin. As the gangrene worsened, the soldiers and civilians decided to take him to Karachev for treatment. He rejected the idea and reportedly died ten days later. Petrov was buried near the Golynka village in the Karachevsky District. In 1956, he was reburied in the Bryansk cemetery.
