= 5th Mechanized Corps =

Red Army designation used for multiple formations

5th Mechanised Corps
- Active: 1st formation: 1934–1938; 2nd formation: 1940–1941; 3rd formation: 1942–1944
- Country: Soviet Union
- Branch: Red Army
- Type: Mechanised corps
- Engagements: World War II: Battle of Smolensk (1941); Operation Little Saturn; Operation Gallop; Battle of Smolensk (1943); Dnieper–Carpathian Offensive; Second Jassy–Kishinev Offensive
- Battle honours: Named for Kalinovsky (1st formation); Dniester (3rd formation); Rymnik (3rd formation)

Commanders
- Notable commanders: Mikhail Petrov; Makar Teryokhin; Ilya Alekseyenko

The 5th Mechanised Corps was a mechanised corps of the Red Army, formed on three occasions. It was first formed in 1934 and was converted into the 15th Tank Corps in 1938. It was reformed in the Far East in 1940 and moved west before the German invasion of the Soviet Union. It fought in the First Battle of Smolensk, losing large numbers of tanks in the Lepel counterattack. The corps was encircled in the Smolensk pocket and after breaking out was disbanded in late August 1941. Its third formation, from elements of the 22nd Tank Corps, occurred in September 1942. The corps fought in: Operation Little Saturn, Operation Gallop, the Second Battle of Smolensk, the Dnieper–Carpathian Offensive, and the Second Jassy–Kishinev Offensive. In September 1944, it became the 9th Guards Mechanised Corps.

== First formation ==
The 5th Mechanised Corps was formed in 1934 at Naro-Fominsk from the 1st Mechanised Brigade and the 50th Rifle Division in the Moscow Military District, commanded by Komdiv Nikolai Rakitin. On 11 June the corps was given the honorific "named for Kalinovsky" in honor of Konstantin Kalinovsky, a Soviet military theorist. The corps included the 13th Mechanised Brigade at Kaluga, the 14th Mechanised Brigade at Naro-Fominsk, and the 50th Rifle and Machine Gun Brigade at Stalinogorsk.

On 15 December 1934 the corps had 525 tanks, including: 159 BT tanks, 181 T-26s, 57 T-37/41, and 6 Vickers Medium Mark II tanks. The remainder were command or flamethrower tanks. On 1 January 1936 the corps had 436 tanks. Around this time, Kombrig Alexander Grechanik became the corps commander. In June 1937, Komdiv Mikhail Petrovich Petrov became corps commander. In September 1937 the 13th Mechanised Brigade was transferred to the 11th Mechanised Corps in the Transbaikal Military District and renamed the 32nd Mechanised Brigade. In October, a new 13th Mechanised Brigade was formed in Kaluga. On 7 May 1938, the corps' Separate Tank Battalion became the Moscow Military District's 4th Light Tank Regiment. In August 1938, the corps was converted into the 15th Tank Corps when the Red Army reorganized its mechanized forces to make them more tank-heavy.

== Second formation ==
The 5th Mechanised Corps (Military Unit Number 4664) began forming on 1 July 1940 as part of the 16th Army in the Transbaikal Military District. The corps' headquarters and the 17th Tank Division were formed at Crossing 77 and the 13th Tank Division at Crossing 76 of the Molotov Railway. It was commanded by Lieutenant General Makar Teryokhin. The corps' headquarters was formed from the headquarters of the 51st Rifle Corps. The 13th Tank Division was formed from the 15th Light Tank Brigade. The 17th Tank Division was formed from the 37th Light Tank Brigade and included the 199th Flamethrower and 526th Transport Battalions. The 109th Motorised Division, formerly of the 12th Rifle Corps, joined the corps at Kharanor. On 11 March 1941 Major General Ilya Alekseyenko, the 17th Tank Division commander, became the corps' commander. The corps was ordered to redeploy west with the 16th Army on 25 May. It was loaded onto trains with the 57th Tank Division and moved west. On 12 June the corps arrived in the Kiev Military District and was unloaded from the trains. Corps headquarters, the 13th Tank Division, and the 109th Motorised Division were located at Berdichev. The 17th Tank Division was located at Isyaslav.

When the German invasion of the Soviet Union began on 22 June, the corps was equipped with 1,070 tanks, including 59 flamethrower tanks and 10 BT-2 tanks, and at least 493 BT-7s. On 26 June, it was ordered to move with the 16th Army to the Orsha and Smolensk area. After reaching Smolensk, it was subordinated to the 20th Army on 4 July for a counterattack to recapture Senno and Lepel in conjunction with the 7th Mechanised Corps. On 6 July the corps had 974 tanks, including: 7 KV tanks, 10 T-34 tanks, 595 BT tanks, 242 T-26 tanks, 61 flamethrower tanks, and 59 T-37/38 amphibious tanks. The corps was to advance 135 kilometres (84 mi), reaching Lepel through Senno.

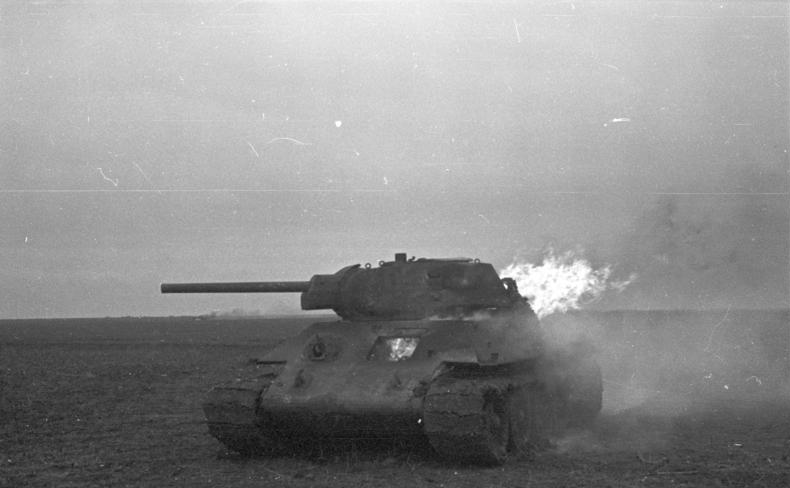
A burning T-34 tank of the type used by the corps.

By the time it went into battle at Lepel on 6 July, the corps was at two-thirds of its strength due to breakdowns. The corps also attacked without air support and with a shortage of anti-aircraft guns, fuel, and ammunition. Alekseyenko deployed the corps in two echelons: the 13th and 17th Tank Divisions attacked first, with the 109th Motorised Division in the second echelon. The 17th Tank Division ran into the 17th Panzer Division at Senno on 6 July at the beginning of the counterattack. The 13th Tank Division was attacked on its left flank by the 18th Panzer Division after advancing farther west than the 17th Tank Division. By 10 July the corps had been mostly destroyed. In the Orsha area the retreating corps was given replacement tanks and ordered to resume the attack the next day. The corps counterattacked toward Vitebsk from the south in conjunction with the 7th Mechanised Corps. Running into the 7th and 12th Panzer Divisions, the combined losses of both corps totalled 100 tanks.

By the end of 15 July the corps was in the Smolensk pocket. From 17 July the remnants of the corps fought against the 12th Panzer Division and the 35th Infantry Division northeast of Orsha until forced to retreat by lack of ammunition to the Liubovichi area. Also, a detachment of remnants of the corps led by Colonel Alexander Lizyukov enabled elements of the 16th and 20th Armies to escape the Smolensk Pocket by defending the Solovevo gap in the German encirclement. On 18 July the corps was ordered to attack German troops in the Krasny region. On the same day, the corps was reported to be fighting in the Liady and Syrokorenye region, 60 kilometres (37 mi) west of Smolensk, while retreating to the Gusino crossing, 45 kilometres (28 mi) west of the city. On 19 July the 109th Motorised Division became the 109th Rifle Division. The 13th and 17th Tank Divisions fought against the 17th and 18th Panzer Divisions in the southern part of the pocket. The corps was moved to the northeastern sector of the pocket to attack towards Dukhovshchina with orders to keep the Solovevo corridor open. On 26 July it was reported to have 58 tanks left. The 1st Motor Rifle Division was attached to the corps in the Smolensk Pocket by 1 August. On the night of 31 July to 1 August, the corps escaped the Smolensk Pocket through a gap in the German encirclement. Corps deputy commander Major General Yevgeny Zhuravlev took command after Alekseyenko died of wounds on 2 August.

On 5 August, after escaping the Smolensk pocket, the corps was ordered to concentrate southeast of Yartsevo. On 7 August the corps was ordered to concentrate southeast of Gzhatsk with the 57th Tank Division. On the night of 7 to 8 August, the corps was ordered to move southeast of Gzhatsk in front reserve. On 10 August the 13th Tank Division was disbanded as a result of heavy losses it had suffered in the pas month of fighting. The corps was disbanded on or around 24 August 1941 due to the Soviet reorganization of their mechanised forces into smaller units. The 17th Tank Division was converted into a tank brigade days later.

== Third formation ==
The 5th Mechanised Corps was reformed on 8 September 1942 on the basis of the 22nd Tank Corps. It was formed in the Moscow Military District under the command of Major General Mikhail Volkov. The corps was mostly equipped with British Lend-Lease tanks, and on 31 October consisted of 2 T-34 tanks, 78 Matilda II infantry tanks, and 117 Valentine tanks, for a total of 197 tanks. On 1 November it included the 45th, 49th, and 50th Mechanised Brigades, and the 188th Separate Tank Brigade. At the time it was part of the Bryansk Front. By December it was part of the Southwestern Front. From 6 December the corps was part of the 5th Tank Army. At the time it had a strength of 193 tanks. The corps was to exploit the breakthrough in Operation Little Saturn. From 12 to 18 December, the corps and the 321st Rifle Division crossed the Chir River against strong resistance from the 11th Panzer Division and the 336th Infantry Division of XXXXVIII Panzer Corps. The corps captured a bridgehead 15 kilometres (9.3 mi) wide and 5 kilometres (3.1 mi) deep near Dalnepodgorovsky, but could not advance further. On 28 December the corps attacked towards Chernyshkovsky with the army, pushing Group Stahel back to the city outskirts, but the corps was thrown back by German reinforcements. By 30 December the Soviet attack had stalled, marking the end of Operation Little Saturn. Almost immediately afterwards, the corps was committed to fight in Operation Gallop from 1 January to 10 February 1943. After the operation, it was withdrawn to the Volga Military District with only the 45th Mechanised Brigade assigned on 1 March. On 31 March the corps' 168th and 188th Tank Regiments were combined into the 233rd Tank Brigade. By 1 April the 49th Mechanised Brigade was re-subordinated to the corps after being directly subordinated to the Volga Military District in March. The 49th was transferred to the Reserve of the Supreme High Command in April. On 1 May the corps was part of the Steppe Military District with the 2nd, 9th, and 45th Mechanised Brigades assigned and the 233rd Tank Brigade also joined the corps. On 1 June the corps was in the Reserve of the Supreme High Command. By 1 August it was part of the Western Front.

The corps fought in the Second Battle of Smolensk and in the Spas–Demensk Offensive of the battle to exploit the Soviet breakthrough on 13 August. It was relocated from Kirov to the 10th Army's sector of the breakthrough towards Vorontsovo and was attached to the army for the operation. By the time it attacked, the German troops' resistance had stiffened, and the corps became bogged down in heavy fighting in the Tyagaevo area, under air attacks which destroyed many of its Lend-Lease tanks. The corps had advanced 5–10 kilometres (3.1–6.2 mi) by 16 August, when a heavy air raid resulted in significant losses, and it was withdrawn to the front reserve. It was returned to the front for the Yelnya–Dorogobuzh Offensive and became part of the 33rd Army on 20 August. The offensive began on 28 August, and the corps was committed to exploit the breakthrough, advancing 6–10 kilometres (3.7–6.2 mi) on that day. The offensive resulted in the capture of Yelnya. The corps fought in the last stage of the battle, the Smolensk–Roslavl Offensive.

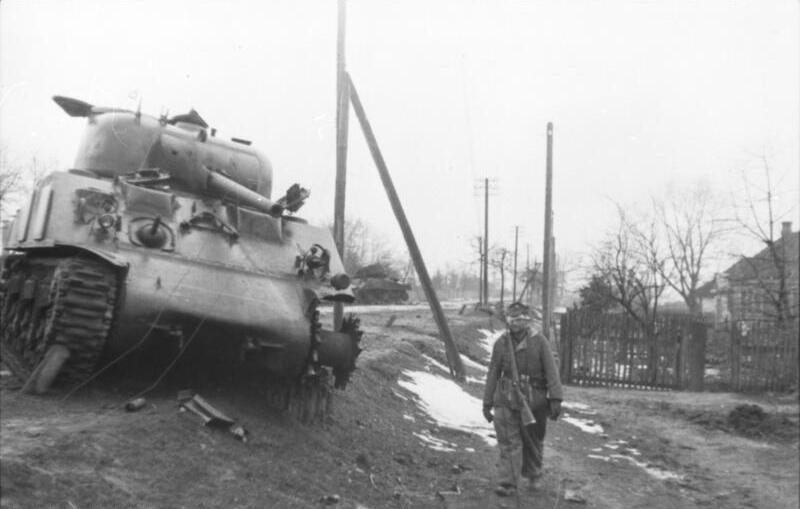
A destroyed Sherman of the type used by the corps.

On 1 October the corps was part of the Western Front, and by 1 November it was back in the Reserve of the Supreme High Command. On 1 January 1944 it was part of the Moscow Military District. They were moved back to Ukraine after being resupplied and reinforced at Naro-Fominsk in December 1943. Between 1 and 12 January 1944 the corps was sent forward by rail to the Fastiv and Kazantin area. Marching 60 kilometres (37 mi), the corps concentrated 60 kilometres (37 mi) south of Bila Tserkva. The 233rd Tank Brigade and 45th Mechanised Brigade were sent into combat after the march and lost a number of tanks. At this point most of their tanks were American M4 Sherman medium tanks. On 21 January it became part of the new 6th Tank Army.

The corps fought in the Korsun–Shevchenkovsky Offensive from 26 January. At the beginning of the offensive, the corps had 106 tanks and 46 self-propelled guns and was almost at full strength. It was to break through south of Tinovka in conjunction with the 104th Rifle Corps, then advance towards Shubennyi Stav, which was to be taken on 26 January with Zvenigorodka. The Shpola region was to be reached on 27 January. For the attack, a tank brigade and a self-propelled gun regiment were held in the 6th Tank Army reserve. The advance of the corps and the 104th Rifle Corps bogged down and made little progress capturing the first German line. On 28 January the corps, without the 233rd Tank Brigade, was attached to the 40th Army and moved west because of a German counterattack. It marched from Malyi Vinograd to Staryi Zhibotin to repulse predicted German counterattacks. The German counterattacks did not materialise and the corps achieved "limited success" (according to a later Soviet General Staff study) with its own attacks. Three days later, the corps was ordered to march back to Malyi Vinograd. By the end of 31 January, it held positions in the Vinograd region. In early February, the corps attacked from the east towards Lysianka, Bosovka, and Malyi Vinograd against counterattacking German troops, pushing them back. On the evening of 3 February the corps was in positions between Zhabinka and Yablonovka. 10 days later, German troops captured Malyi Vinograd, pushing back the corps and other units. The front stabilized and the corps with the 6th Tank Army was moved back to the second echelon of the front.

In March and April 1944, the corps fought in the Uman–Botoșani Offensive. A tank regiment from the corps reached Mohyliv-Podilskyi on the morning of 19 March and by the end of the day the city had been captured. On the next night the Dniester had been crossed and by 21 March the corps was on the west bank of the river. On 4 August the corps was awarded the honorific "Dniester" for its actions in crossing the river and capturing Bălți during the Uman–Botoșani Offensive. In August and September, the corps fought in the Second Jassy–Kishinev Offensive. In accordance with Stavka order number 0306 the 5th Mechanised Corps was transformed into the 9th Guards Mechanised Corps on 12 September for its actions. On the same day the corps was awarded the honorific "Rymnik" for its actions in the capture of Rymnik.

== Commanders ==
The following officers commanded the corps' first formation:

- Komdiv Nikolai Rakitin (May 1934 – 1936)
- Kombrig Alexander Grechanik (1936)
- Komdiv Mikhail Petrovich Petrov (June 1937 – August 1938)

The following officers commanded the corps' second formation:

- Lieutenant General Makar Teryokhin (July 1940 – March 1941)
- Major General Ilya Alekseyenko (March – August 1941)
- Major General Yevgeny Zhuravlev (August 1941)

The following officer commanded the corps' third formation:

- Major General (promoted to Lieutenant General 5 November 1943) Mikhail Volkov (2 November 1942 – 12 September 1944)

== Structure ==
The corps' first formation included the following units:

- 13th Mechanised Brigade (1st formation) (to September 1937)
- 13th Mechanised Brigade (2nd formation) (from October 1937)
- 14th Mechanised Brigade
- 50th Rifle and Machine Gun Brigade
- Separate Reconnaissance Battalion (became Separate Tank Battalion June 1937) (to 7 May 1938)

The corps' second formation included the following units:

- 13th Tank Division
- 17th Tank Division
- 109th Motorised Division
- 8th Motorcycle Regiment
- 255th Separate Communications Battalion
- 55th Separate Road Battalion
- 105th Corps Aviation Squadron
- 484th Field Cash Office of the State Bank

The corps' third formation included the following units:

- 45th Mechanised Brigade
- 49th Mechanised Brigade (to April 1943)
- 50th Mechanised Brigade (to February 1943)
- 2nd Mechanised Brigade (from April 1943)
- 9th Mechanised Brigade (from April 1943)
- 233rd Tank Brigade (from April 1943)
- 188th Tank Regiment (October 1942 to March 1943)
- 168th Tank Regiment (November 1942 to March 1943)
- 1827th Heavy Self-Propelled Artillery Regiment (from July 1943)
- 1700th Anti-Aircraft Artillery Regiment (from June 1943)
- 64th Separate Motorcycle Battalion (from October 1942)
- 45th Armored Car Battalion (from October 1942 to November 1943)
- 657th Separate Communications Battalion (from 27 July 1943)
- 39th Separate Sapper Battalion (from 30 October 1942)
- 81st Repair and Recovery Battalion (from 30 October 1942)
- 159th Separate Chemical Defence Company (from 27 July 1943)
- 6th Separate Engineer-Mine Company (from 30 October 1942)
