= 86th Rifle Division =

- Active: 1st formation: 1936–1941; 2nd formation: 1941–1946
- Country: Soviet Union
- Allegiance: Red Army
- Branch: Infantry
- Size: Division
- Engagements: Winter War; World War II
- Decorations: Order of the Red Banner (1st formation)
- Battle honours: Kazan (1st formation); named for the Central Executive Committee of the Tatar ASSR (replaced by named for the Presidium of the Supreme Soviet of the Tatar ASSR; 1st formation); Tartu (2nd formation)

The 86th Rifle Division (Russian: 86-я стрелковая дивизия) was an infantry division of the Soviet Union's Red Army during the Interwar period, World War II, and the early postwar period, formed twice.

== Interwar period ==
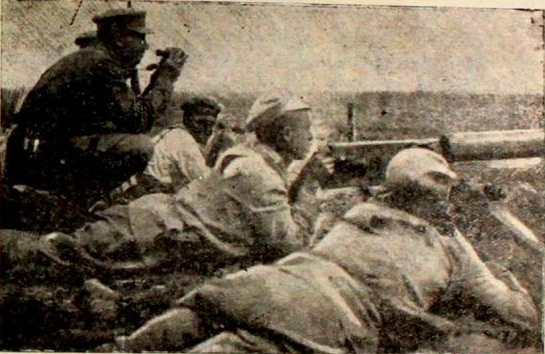
Division commander Yakub Chanyshev observing maneuvers, c. 1932

By an order of the Volga Military District on 23 May 1922, the 1st Kazan Separate Rifle Brigade, formed from a rifle brigade of the 16th Rifle Division and the Saransk Reserve Brigade, was reorganized as the 1st Rifle Division. It was part of the Volga Military District and on 18 October received the honorific Kazan. Most of its units were stationed in Kazan, including the 1st Kazan Rifle Regiment. The division became a territorial division in December 1923, and on 29 July 1930 it received the honorific named for the Central Executive Committee of the Tatar ASSR. On 29 May 1936, the division was renumbered as the 86th Kazan Rifle Division named for the Central Executive Committee of the Tatar ASSR. On 3 October 1939, elements of the division were used to form the 111th Rifle Division while the remaining troops, reinforced by other units, were used to form the 86th Motor Rifle Division.

Between January and March 1940, under the command of Kombrig Yury Novoselsky, the division participated in the Winter War as part of the Leningrad Military District, for which it was awarded the Order of Red Banner before briefly returning to the Volga Military District in April. It was transferred to the Western Special Military District and stationed in Proskurov from June. On 16 July, the division's honorific named for the Central Executive Committee of the Tatar ASSR was changed to named for the Presidium of the Supreme Soviet of the Tatar ASSR, and it was converted back to a rifle division.

== World War II ==
=== 1st Formation ===
It was engaged on 22 June 1941 in border battles, being almost destroyed in the process of defending the sector of the 64th Fortified Region of the 5th Rifle Corps, 10th Army, at Tzekhanovo in the Belostock area against five Wehrmacht infantry divisions. The division was disbanded soon after, but in 1943 partisans found all the divisional standards in a hide, and the units were reinstated on the RKKA rolls.

Composition

- 169th, 284th, 330th Rifle Regiments
- 248th Artillery Regiment
- 383rd Howitzer Regiment
- 128th Anti-tank Destroyer Battalion
- 342nd Anti-aircraft Artillery Battalion
- 109th Reconnaissance Battalion
- 120th Sapper Battalion
- 95th Separate Communications Battalion
- 14th Motor-rifle Battalion
- 20th Auto-transport Battalion
- 13th Field Bakery
- 32nd Divisional Artillery Workshop
- 366th Field Mail Station
- 626th Field Bank

=== 2nd Formation ===
The 86th Rifle Division (2nd Formation) was established at Lavrovo in September 1941 from the 4th Division of the Leningrad People's Militia Army, as part of the 7th Army. The 4th People's Militia Division was one of the better quality Leningrad provisional divisions, with men mostly having prior military service. The division fought near Leningrad in extremely difficult weather conditions at the Nevsky Pyatachok at which time it was renamed as the 86th Rifle Division. When formed it included 1st, 3rd and 4th Separate Special Rifle Brigades, 50th, 111th and 112th Separate Rifle Battalions and Special Sailor's Battalion. From January 1942 the division fought in the 8th Army sector of the Leningrad Front. The division later served in the capture of Tartu on 25 August 1944 as part of the 67th Army (3rd Baltic Front), and in East Prussia. With 2nd Shock Army of the 2nd Belorussian Front May 1945.

== Post-war ==
The division remained part of the Group of Soviet Forces in Germany with the 2nd Shock Army's 116th Rifle Corps. In February and March 1946, the division was withdrawn to Kharkov along with the corps. The division became part of the 14th Guards Rifle Corps and in May 1946 was converted into the 17th Rifle Brigade. The brigade and its corps became part of the Kiev Military District at Dnipropetrovsk months later. In March 1947, the brigade was disbanded.
