= 2nd Mechanized Corps (Soviet Union) =

2nd Mechanized Corps (June 1940 – Aug 1941) 2nd Mechanized Corps (Sept 1942 – July 1943) 7th Guards Mechanized Corps (July 1943 – Sept 1945)
- Active: 1940-1945
- Country: Soviet Union
- Branch: Armoured Forces
- Type: Mechanised Corps
- Engagements: Operation München; Battle of Uman; Battle for Velikiye Luki; Operation Kutuzov; Battle of the Dnieper; Vistula–Oder Offensive; Lower Silesian Offensive; Battle of Berlin.

Commanders
- Notable commanders: Lieutenant General Yury Novoselsky; Lieutenant General Ivan Korchagin

The 2nd Mechanised Corps was a formation in the Soviet Red Army during the Second World War.

== First formation (June 1940 – Aug 1941) ==
Initially formed in June 1940 in response the German victories of 1940 it was attached to the Odessa Military District, & attached to the 9th Army in the Odessa Fortified Region in Soviet Union It was under the command of Lieutenant General Yury Novoselsky when the German Operation Barbarossa began in June 1941. It initially comprised the 11th and 16th Tank Divisions, & the 15th Mechanized Division.

On 22 June 1941 2nd Mechanized Corps comprised 32,396 men, 517 tanks, 186 armoured cars, 162 artillery pieces, 189 mortars, 3794 vehicles, 266 Tractors & 375 Motorcycles including lighter models T-26, Bt 7, & T-28's & 60 of the newer T-34 & KV-1 models. On 22 July 1941 2nd Mechanized Corps consisted of 11th Tank Division 181 (81 Operational) tanks, 1070 vehicles & 71 tractors. 16th Tank Division with 99 tanks, 870 vehicles & 16 tractors & 15th Mechanized Division with 188 (102 operational) tanks, no vehicles & 122 tractors.

After the invasion began the Odessa Military District was renamed Southern Front, Commanded by Colonel General Ivan Tyulenev. The front fielded the 9th and 18th Armies. The 2nd Mechanized Corps was heavily involved in the first battles of Operation Barbarossa, helping to defend Soviet occupied Bessarabia with Colonel General Yakov Cherevichenko's 9th Army against Generaloberst Schobert's 11th Army, which had penetrated Soviet defenses, captured Iassy & reached the Prut River on the first day of action in Operation München.

However, after initially withdrawing to behind the Dniester River on Tiulenev's orders Stavka ordered 6th Army & 2nd Mechanized Corps to recapture the Prut River line. By 18 July Schobert's 11th Army, had crossed the Dniester River & Stavka finally realised that the 6th, 12th & 18th Armies faced encirclement & ordered the 2nd Mechanized Corps to the Uman region to halt the German advance into Southern Front's rear.

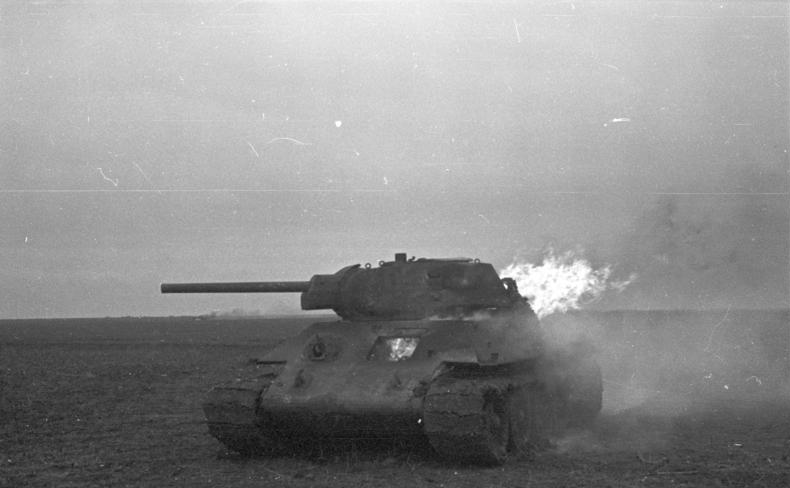
A burning T-34 in Russia in 1941

The line was already in German hands & this decision was far too late. Mikhail Kirponos commander of Southwestern Front now ordered 26th Army to wheel about & cover their withdrawal & for 6th & 12th Armies to attack eastwards to meet up. By 20 July, 2nd Mechanized Corps was holding open a narrow corridor upon to the east between XXXVIII Panzer Corps & 17th Army.

Two days later the trap was shut, and although the 2nd Mechanized Corps tried to free the surrounded armies on 8 August the fighting was over: 107,000 officers & men, including Generals Pavel Ponedelin & Ivan Muzychenko, four corps commanders & 11 division commanders, 286 tanks & 953 guns were captured. Another two corps commanders & six division commanders perished in the fighting. 2nd Mechanized Corps was largely destroyed.

Rkkaww2 states: The residual men of the 11th Tank Division joined the 12th Army. The division's remnants were reorganised into the 132nd Tank Brigade (21 August 1941), later the 4th Guards Tank Brigade. The entire headquarters of the 15th Motorised Division was captured. However, later, the divisional commander, Colonel Laskin, managed to escape from captivity. The residual personnel of the 14th Tank Regiment eventually formed the 71st Separate Tank Battalion, which joined the 12th Rifle Corps of the Southern Front.

== Second formation (September 1942 – July 1943) ==
A new 2nd Mechanized corps started to be formed in September 1942 on the basis of the directive of NPO No. 1104308ss of 8 September 1942.

The corps entered into battle on the Kalinin Front as part of the 43rd Army, after which it was almost immediately included in the 3rd Shock Army. In April 1943, the corps was withdrawn to the reserve and in May of that year it was included in the 3rd Guards Army, and in September of that year - in the 2nd Tank Army. The Corps fought in the Battle for Velikiye Luki and Operation Kutuzov.

Commander of the Corps was Major General of the Tank Forces, later Lieutenant General of the Tank Forces, Ivan Korchagin.

== 7th Guards Mechanized Corps (July 1943 – September 1945) ==
By the order of NCO No. 0404 July 26, 1943, the 2nd Mechanized Corps was transformed into the 7th Guards Mechanized Corps for heroism and courage, stamina and courage of personnel in battles against Nazi invaders, as well as for exemplary performance of combat missions shown during the Oryol offensive operation (Operation Kutuzov). It included the 24th, 25th and 26th Guards Mechanized Brigades, the 57th Guards Tank Brigade, two self-propelled artillery regiments, and other units.

Lieutenant General of the Tank Forces Ivan Korchagin remained commander of the Corps for the rest of the War.

The 7th Guards Mechanized Corps fought in the Battle of the Dnieper (Autumn 1943) until December 1943, when the corps was withdrawn to the Headquarters reserve.

In the fall of 1943 Grigory Kabakovsky was a lieutenant and company commander in the motor rifle battalion of the 57th Guards Tank Brigade. When the company reached the Desna River, he reportedly organized the crossing. The Dnieper was reached by 25 September. The company led by Kabakovsky crossed the river north of Kiev. With grenades, rifle fire and a machine gun, Kabakovsky reportedly killed 60 German soldiers in the battle to hold the bridgehead. In pursuit of retreating German troops, the company reportedly advanced to the northern outskirts of Domantovo, Chernobyl Raion, reportedly killing about 50 German soldiers. The German forces counterattacked but were reportedly repulsed three times. While repulsing a counterattack, Kabakovsky was reportedly seriously wounded but continued to command. On 17 October 1943 he was awarded the title Hero of the Soviet Union and the Order of Lenin for his actions.

By VGK Order No 12 of 15 September 1943, and NKO Order № 0236 of 2 August 1944, the corps gained the Nezhin and Kuzbass honors respectively (Kuzbassko-Nezhinskaya).

Only in September 1944, the 7th Guards Mechanized Corps was transferred to the 3rd Belorussian Front, and from January 1945 to the 1st Ukrainian Front, in which it ended the war.

The Corps fought in the Vistula–Oder Offensive, Lower Silesian Offensive and Battle of Berlin. It suffered a major setback in late April 1945 on the southern flank of the front during a counterattack of German troops, when part of the Corps was surrounded and destroyed.

== Post War ==
By a directive of 7 September 1945, the corps was reduced in status to the 7th Guards Mechanised Division. This division was part of the 4th Mechanized Army of the GSVG. It was stationed in the 1936 Olympic Village (de:Olympisches Dorf (Berlin)) (Dallgow-Döberitz barracks). In November 1947, the division was reduced to the 7th Guards Personnel Mechanized Regiment.

By a directive of 17 May 1957, the 11th Guards Motor Rifle Division was created on the base of the reformed division. In the summer of 1958, it was moved to Smolensk. In the spring of 1968, it was relocated to Bezrechnaya station in the Chita Oblast. On 1 December 1989, the 11th Division was reduced into the 5890th Guards Base for the storage of military equipment (VKhVT). The 5890th Guards VKhVT was disbanded in September 1992.
