= 17th Tank Division (Soviet Union) =

- Active: 1940–1941
- Country: Soviet Union
- Branch: Red Army
- Type: Armor
- Engagements: World War II: Battle of Smolensk

Commanders
- Notable commanders: Ilya Alekseyenko; Ivan Korchagin

The 17th Tank Division (Military Unit Number 6061) was a tank division of the Red Army that was formed in mid-1940. The division suffered heavy losses during fighting against German forces during the Battle of Smolensk and was converted into a tank brigade in late August 1941.

== History ==
The 17th Tank Division was formed in July 1940 at Crossing 77 with the 5th Mechanised Corps from the 37th Light Tank Brigade. It also included the 199th Flamethrower and 526th Transport Battalions. The 17th Tank Division's structure in 1941 included the 33rd and 34th Tank Regiments, the 17th Motor Rifle Regiment, the 17th Howitzer Artillery Regiment, the 17th Reconnaissance Battalion, the 17th Transport Battalion and the 17th Maintenance Battalion. The division was commanded by Major General Ilya Alekseyenko. On 1 March 1941 Colonel Ivan Korchagin took command. Beginning on 12 June 1941 the division was relocated to Izyaslav.

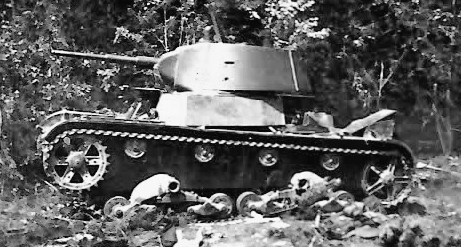
A destroyed T-26 of the type used by the division

After the German invasion of the Soviet Union, the division moved with the corps to Smolensk. The division was 60% Ukrainian in early July, and German troops attributed its reportedly poor performance to its ethnic composition. On 6 July, the division had 413 tanks, including 237 BT tanks and 130 T-26 tanks. The remainder were flamethrower or amphibious tanks. The division fought in the 5th Mechanized Corps' counterattack towards Senno and Lepel. The division was placed in the corps' first echelon during the counterattack. When it reached the region south of Senno, the division, reinforced by 6 KV-1 and 10 T-34 tanks, ran into the 17th Panzer Division. The counterattack failed with heavy losses. The division was encircled in the Smolensk Pocket, in which it defended the Dnieper line to the west of the city. The division fought against the 17th and 18th Panzer Divisions, which were attempting to establish positions on the southern bank of the river. On 25 July, the division had three KV tanks, four T-34s, 73 BT tanks, 28 T-26s, and 16 KhT-26 flamethrower tanks, for a total of 124 tanks. On the night of 31 July to 1 August, the division and the rest of the corps escaped the Smolensk Pocket through the gap in the German encirclement line.

On 28 August, it was converted into the 126th Tank Brigade. On 31 August, the 17th Motor Rifle Regiment was awarded the Order of Lenin. The brigade was destroyed in the Vyazma Pocket in October. It was not officially disbanded until 22 August 1942.
