= Khristinovka =

Khristinovka Христиновка
- Selo
- Location within Amur Oblast Location within Russia
- Coordinates: 51°29′N 128°48′E
- Country: Russia
- Region: Amur Oblast
- District: Mazanovsky District
- Time zone: UTC+9:00

Khristinovka (Russian: Христиновка) is a rural locality (a selo) in Sapronovsky Selsoviet of Mazanovsky District, Amur Oblast, Russia. The population was 37 as of 2018. There are 2 streets.

== Geography ==
Khristinovka is located 25 km south of Novokiyevsky Uval (the district's administrative centre) by road. Yubileynoye is the nearest rural locality.
