= Gorokhovetsky Uyezd =

Gorokhovetsky Uyezd (Russian: Горохове́цкий уе́зд) was one of the subdivisions of the Vladimir Governorate of the Russian Empire. It was situated in the northeastern part of the governorate. Its administrative centre was Gorokhovets.

== Demographics ==
At the time of the Russian Empire Census of 1897, Gorokhovetsky Uyezd had a population of 92,240. Of these, 99.9% spoke Russian and 0.1% Belarusian as their native language.
