= 5th Tank Army =

- Active: First Formation; 5 June 1942 – 15 July 1942: Second Formation; 3 September 1942 - 20 April 1943
- Country: Soviet Union
- Branch: Red Army

The 5th Tank Army is the name of several Soviet units during World War II (not to be confused with the 5th Guards Tank Army).

Its first formation occurred on 5 June, 1942, commanded by Major-General Alexander Lizyukov, serving under the Bryansk Front in the Voronezh sector, and was dissolved after suffering heavy losses on 15 July 1942.

The second formation occurred on 3 September 1942, where it served under the Southwestern Front for the winter offensive 1942–1943 and was dissolved on 20 April 1943. Its staff then served as the core for the creation of the 12th Army.

== Commanders ==
- Major General Alexander Lizyukov (June - July 1942)
- Major-General Pavel Rybalko (July - October 1942)
- Major-General Prokofy Romanenko (November - December 1942)
- Lieutenant-General Markian Popov (December 1942 - January 1943)
- Major General, since March 1943 Lieutenant-General, Ivan Shlemin (January - April 1943)
