= Zalustezhye =

Rural locality in Luzhsky District, Russia

Coordinates: 58°58′N 29°00′E

Zalustezhye (Russian: Залустежье) is a rural locality (a village) in Luzhsky District of Leningrad Oblast, Russia. Its population was 41 (2010 census).
