= Ilya Alekseyenko =

Ukrainian Red Army major general

Ilya Prokofyevich Alekseyenko
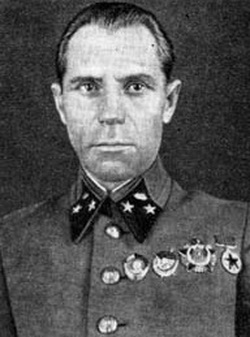
- Alekseyenko in 1940
- Born: 20 June 1899; Podol, Grayvoronsky Uyezd, Kursk Governorate, Russian Empire
- Died: 3 August 1941 (aged 42) Vyazma, Smolensk Oblast, Soviet Union
- Allegiance: Russian SFSR; Soviet Union
- Branch: Red Army (later Soviet Army)
- Service years: 1918–1941
- Rank: Major general
- Commands: 17th Tank Division; 5th Mechanized Corps
- Conflicts: Russian Civil War; Polish–Soviet War; Battles of Khalkhin Gol; World War II (DOW)
- Awards: Order of Lenin (2); Order of the Red Banner

Ilya Prokofyevich Alekseyenko (Russian: Илья́ Проко́фьевич Алексе́енко; 20 June 1899 – 3 August 1941) was a Ukrainian Red Army major general.

After joining the Red Army in 1918, Alekseyenko served as a junior commander in machine gun units during the Russian Civil War and the Polish–Soviet War. Stationed in Ukraine for much of the 1920s and 1930s, he held command and staff positions and from the early 1930s served in armored units. Decorated for his command of a tank brigade during the Battles of Khalkhin Gol, Alekseyenko commanded the 5th Mechanized Corps at the outbreak of Operation Barbarossa. He led it during the Battle of Smolensk, receiving a second Order of Lenin for his performance during the Lepel counterattack, and was mortally wounded in early August 1941.

== Early life and Russian Civil War ==
Alekseyenko was born to a peasant family on 20 June 1899 in the sloboda of Podol, Grayvoronsky Uyezd, Kursk Governorate. After graduating from a four-year primary school in 1913, he worked at a noodle factory in Rostov-on-Don between 1915 and 1917. Following the Russian Revolution, Alekseyenko first joined a Red Guard detachment in March 1918 and two months later joined the Red Army, becoming a Red Army man with the 74th Kursk Soviet Infantry Regiment. In April 1919 he became a cadet at the Kursk Infantry Command Courses, before being transferred to the 1st Moscow Soviet Machine Gun Command Courses.

After graduation from the latter in April 1920, he was appointed a machine gun platoon commander in the 420th Rifle Regiment of the 47th Rifle Division of the 12th Army. A month later, he was transferred to the 57th Rifle Regiment of the army's 7th Rifle Division, serving successively as a platoon commander, assistant chief and chief of the machine gun detachment. During this period he fought in the Polish–Soviet War and against the Revolutionary Insurrectionary Army of Ukraine.

== Interwar period ==
Alekseyenko served with the 44th Rifle Division of the Ukrainian Military District from May 1922 as assistant chief of the machine gun detachments of the 391st and later 131st Rifle Regiments of the division. He transferred to the Kiev Combined Military School in October 1924 to serve as course commander and company commander. After graduating from the Kharkov Machine Gun Command Courses in 1925, Alekseyenko graduated from the Kiev Combined Military School by external examination in 1926. He returned to the 44th Rifle Division in November 1930, becoming a battalion commander in the 132nd and later the 131st Rifle Regiments.

After studying at the Leningrad Armored Courses for the Improvement of Command Cadre between May and September 1932, Alekseyenko returned to the 44th as commander of the divisional separate tank battalion. He transferred to the 17th Mechanized Brigade of the Ukrainian Military District (later renamed the Kiev Military District) in May 1935 to serve as commander of its tank training battalion, and became commander of the 28th Mechanized Regiment of the 28th Cavalry Division in June 1937. Alekseyenko was promoted to major in 1935 and to colonel in 1938. Having transferred to the 32nd Cavalry Division of the same district to command its 9th Tank Regiment in April 1938, Alekseyenko received command of the 11th Light Tank Brigade on 12 July 1939 and led it during the Battles of Khalkhin Gol.

During the massive Soviet counterattack at Khalkhin Gol in late August, Alekseyenko was given command of the northern group of the Soviet force. Georgy Zhukov, the commander of the 1st Army Group, described Alekseyenko as having commanded "firmly and confidently" and "behaved courageously", characterizing him as a "proactive and energetic" commander deserving of promotion. For his leadership, Alekseyenko was awarded the Order of Lenin and promoted to kombrig on 29 October. Made a major general on 4 June 1940 when the Red Army reintroduced general's ranks, Alekseyenko became commander of the 17th Tank Division of the 5th Mechanized Corps during the month and in March 1941 received command of the corps itself, part of the 16th Army of the Transbaikal Military District.

== World War II ==
The 5th Mechanized Corps was transferred west just before the beginning of Operation Barbarossa, the German invasion of the Soviet Union, on 22 June 1941. In July the corps was attached to the 20th Army of the Western Front and fought in the Lepel counterattack, in which it suffered heavy losses to German tanks and aircraft. Alekseyenko commanded the corps in the Battle of Smolensk, during which it fought encircled between 10 and 11 July. For "skillful command of corps units when breaking out of the encirclement," Alekseyenko posthumously received a second Order of Lenin on 9 August. He was severely wounded on 2 August by mortar shell fragments during a bombardment at the Solovyovsky Crossing, and died on the next day at a hospital in Vyazma. He was buried at the Yekaterininsky Cemetery in Vyazma.

== Awards and honors ==
Alekseyenko received the following awards and decorations:

- Order of Lenin (1939, 1941)
- Order of the Red Banner (1938)
- Jubilee Medal "XX Years of the Workers' and Peasants' Red Army" (1938)
- Order of the Red Banner of the Mongolian People's Republic (1939)
