= 15th Tank Corps =

Soviet Union Red Army tank corps

- Active: 1938–1940 (1st formation); 1942–1943 (2nd formation)
- Country: Soviet Union
- Branch: Red Army
- Engagements: 1st formation: Soviet invasion of Poland: Battle of Grodno; 2nd formation: German-Soviet War: Kozelsk Offensive; Ostrogozhsk-Rossosh Offensive; Operation Star; Third Battle of Kharkov; Operation Kutuzov

Commanders
- Notable commanders: Mikhail Petrov; Vasily Koptsov; Filipp Rudkin

The 15th Tank Corps (Russian: 15-й танковый корпус, 15-y tankoviy korpus) was a tank corps of the Soviet Union's Red Army. It formed in 1938 from a mechanized corps and fought in the Soviet invasion of Poland, during which it participated in the capture of the Grodno and Augustów Forest from Poland. The corps was disbanded in January 1940 at Vilnius and Šalčininkai in Lithuania.

In 1942, the corps was reformed under the command of Major General Vasily Koptsov and became part of the 3rd Tank Army. It first saw combat in the unsuccessful Kozelsk Offensive of late August and early September, a relatively small operation to encircle a German salient, which resulted in the corps taking heavy losses in proportion to the territory gained. After spending the rest of the year in reserve, receiving new supplies and equipment, the corps was transferred to the southern front in southwestern Russia to fight in the Ostrogozhsk–Rossosh Offensive during January 1943, in which it played a major role by forming part of the forces that encircled thousands of Axis troops on the middle reaches of the Don River.

In February 1943, the unit fought in Operation Star, achieving its objective of recapturing the key city of Kharkov in eastern Ukraine. As the Soviet advance outran its supply lines, the corps was slowly worn down and was virtually destroyed after being surrounded by a German counteroffensive in the Third Battle of Kharkov during late February and early March. Koptsov was among those killed in the fighting. The corps was rebuilt in the following months and became part of the newly created 3rd Guards Tank Army, fighting in Operation Kutuzov, the Soviet counteroffensive during the Battle of Kursk, in late July. For its actions in the offensive, the corps was converted into the 7th Guards Tank Corps.

== First formation ==
The 15th Tank Corps formed in 1938 from the 5th Mechanized Corps at Naro-Fominsk in the Moscow Military District, inheriting the honorific "named for (Konstantin) Kalinovsky", a Soviet military theorist. Commanded by Komdiv (equivalent to Lieutenant General) Mikhail Petrovich Petrov, the corps included the 2nd Light Tank Brigade (previously the 5th Mechanized Brigade), the 27th Light Tank Brigade (formerly 10th Mechanized Brigade), the 20th Motor Rifle and Machine Gun Brigade (formerly 50th Rifle and Machine Gun Brigade), and the 401st Separate Communications Battalion, a support unit. Soon after its formation, the corps was transferred to the Belorussian Special Military District, its headquarters located in Borisov. The 2nd and 27th Light Tank Brigades were based in Borisov, and the 20th Motor Rifle and Machine Gun Brigade was based in Mogilev. The 89th Separate Air Liaison Flight formed as part of the corps at Borisov on 4 August, operating Polikarpov R-5 and U-2 biplanes.

=== Soviet invasion of Poland ===
==== Initial advance ====
Corps movements during the invasion of Poland between 17 and 24 September 1939

The corps fought in the Soviet invasion of Poland in September 1939, as part of Ivan Boldin's Dzerzhinsky Cavalry-Mechanized Group (KMG). The invasion was conducted under the terms of the Molotov–Ribbentrop Pact, which divided Poland between the Soviet Union and Nazi Germany and guaranteed that neither country would attack the other. At the beginning of the campaign, the 2nd Brigade had 234 BT-7 light tanks and 30 BA armored cars, the 27th Brigade had 223 BT-7s and 31 BAs, and the 20th Brigade had 61 BAs; the corps thus fielded 461 tanks and 122 armored cars. On 17 September, at 05:00, the corps, advancing on the KMG's southern flank, crossed the state border, overran the Polish border guards, and began a rapid advance without resistance; most of the Polish troops in the east had been transferred west to fight against the German invasion of Poland earlier in the month. By 12:00, the 27th Brigade had reached Mir and Ajucavičy, overrunning the practically undefended Nowosiółki–Kajszówki sector of the Baranovichi Fortified Region. By the end of the day, the 27th Brigade had crossed the Servach River in the Lubanichi area, the 2nd Brigade had crossed the Usza River, and the 20th Brigade had advanced to the border at Losha. During the day, the corps suffered casualties of one killed and two wounded. On 18 September, the 27th Brigade advanced from the line of Rudašy and Zaberdowo, but was bogged down for several hours while moving through the area near Golewicze. As a result, it did not reach the Jarniewo area, 2 kilometers (1.2 mi) west of Slonim, until the morning of 19 September. After the retreating Polish garrison burned one of the two bridges over the Shchara River, the 2nd Brigade entered Slonim and disarmed 80 policemen. On 19 September, the brigade reached Vawkavysk, and the corps was ordered to take Grodno and Sokółka by the end of the day, in conjunction with the motorcycle units of the 4th and 13th Rifle Divisions. At the same time the 27th Brigade captured Dvorets, disarming 400 people and capturing 300 rifles, but fuel shortages kept the corps stretched out along the Slonim–Vawkavysk road awaiting refueling. The 20th Brigade approached Slonim from the east, further clogging the roads and delaying the arrival of supply units.

==== Battle of Grodno ====
After receiving fuel from 07:00 on 20 September, the units of the corps began to advance on Grodno in multiple waves. At 13:00, 50 tanks from the 27th Brigade reached the southern outskirts of the city, beginning the Battle of Grodno. By 14:00, the 2nd Brigade had taken Sokółka, and its advance units had reached Dąbrowa. At the end of the day, motorcycle units of the 4th Rifle Division and battalions of the 20th Motor Rifle and Machine Gun Brigade, which had all been delayed by fuel shortages, had reached the city. Grodno was defended by an understrength force of up to 3,000 Polish officers, gendarmes, and volunteers who had burned the bridges across the Neman. The 27th Brigade's reconnaissance battalion launched the first attack with 12 tanks and an armored car, and was later joined by two tank battalions with a total of 36 tanks. By 19:00, two battalions of the 13th Rifle Division's 119th Rifle Regiment had arrived at Grodno, and on the morning of 21 September they were reinforced by two battalions of the 4th Rifle Division's 101st Rifle Regiment and the motorized detachment of the 16th Rifle Corps, the latter of which was subordinated to the corps for the duration of the battle. By the end of 20 September, the combined forces had captured the southern part of Grodno.

At 07:00 on 21 September, the artillery batteries of the two rifle regiments and the 20th Brigade commenced firing from the southern bank of the Niemen, demolishing the main Polish strongpoints—barracks, churches, and trenches—on the northern bank of the Niemen. The 119th Regiment then crossed to the north bank and rebuilt a bridge for the tanks to use. After defeating a group of Polish officers in the Poniemuń district, the regiment captured the eastern part of the city. Meanwhile, the 101st Regiment and a tank company from the 27th Brigade, which crossed the river behind the 119th, destroyed a group of about 250 officers defending the wooded hills 1.5 kilometers (0.93 mi) east of the city, then advanced northeast and captured the railway station by the end of the day. The 20th Brigade captured the southwestern part of the city, but was unable to advance northward because of strong Polish resistance in the houses and trenches near the bridge and the tobacco factory. The Soviet advances on 21 September resulted in the suppression of large pockets of resistance, and during the night, remnants of the Polish defenders retreated in the direction of Sapotskin and Suwałki.

Grodno was cleared of Polish troops on 22 September. The 27th Brigade lost two burned and 12 damaged BT-7 light tanks in the battle, some to Molotov cocktails thrown by the defenders from attics and trenches, and its casualties totaled 19 killed and 26 wounded. The 20th Brigade lost a BA-10 to Molotov cocktails, suffering casualties of 3 killed and 20 wounded. The 16th Rifle Corps' motorized detachment lost 25 killed, 110 wounded, and a burned tank. During the battle, the corps killed 320 officers, 20 non-commissioned officers, and 194 soldiers, many of whom were crushed by tanks in the eastern part of the city. Between 20 and 21 September, they had captured 38 Polish officers, 20 non-commissioned officers, and 1,477 enlisted men, as well as 514 rifles, 146 machine guns, a mortar, and an anti-aircraft gun.

==== Mopping up operations and disbandment ====
One detachment from the 2nd Brigade, under the command of Major F.P. Chuvakin, was composed of a machine gun and rifle battalion and 45 tanks, 37 of which were from the brigade and the rest from the KMG. It was attached to the KMG to mop up remaining resistance in the Augustów Forest and to prevent the Poles fleeing to Lithuania. On 22 September, in the area of Sapotskin, the detachment engaged units of the Polish 101st and 102nd Uhlan Regiments, as well as the 110th Reserve Uhlan Regiment, and other units retreating from Grodno. Most of the Polish troops escaped into the forest because of the slow advance of the detachment. Around three companies of Polish troops were dispersed and several officers were killed, among them the Grodno defense commander, Józef Olszyna-Wilczyński. The retreating Polish forces left mines, which blew up four BT-7 tanks. Chuvakin's troops also lost 11 killed and 14 wounded.

The detachment advanced to Sejny and on 23 September reached the Augustów Canal at Vulka, where it was stopped by Polish troops on the left bank, who had burned the bridge over the canal. A tank company forded the canal and forced the defenders to retreat, leaving nine dead. In the fighting of 22 and 23 September, the detachment killed about 40 officers and many soldiers, and captured more than 500 troops, 300 rifles, and 12 machine guns. On 23 September, the 20th Brigade moved to Dąbrowa, where it eliminated remnants of Polish units in the Augustów Forest. Two days later, 15 armored cars were detached from the brigade to relieve German troops garrisoning the Osowiec Fortress, which fell in the Soviet sphere of influence under the Molotov–Ribbentrop Pact. Between 23 and 26 September, a detachment of 20 tanks and armored cars from the 27th Brigade and a rifle battalion moved along the road from Grodno to Augustów, and back again, capturing 300 prisoners along the way. During the campaign, the corps killed 78 officers, 133 non-commissioned officers, and 2,337 soldiers. It captured 322 officers, 30 non-commissioned officers, and 352 soldiers, as well as 814 rifles, 153 machine guns, a mortar, two cannons, and 15 cars.

By 2 October, the KMG was disbanded and the corps was subordinated to the 3rd Army. On 10 October, the corps headquarters and the tank brigades were stationed in Vilnius, and the 20th Brigade was in Šalčininkai. The 15th was disbanded along with the other tank corps in January 1940; the Main Military Council considered the tank corps' performance in Poland unsatisfactory, believing them to be unwieldy and difficult to control.

== Second formation ==
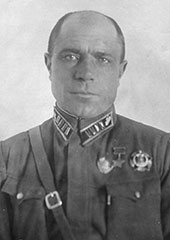
Corps commander Vasily Koptsov, c. 1940

The corps was re-formed in May 1942 at the Moscow Armored Training Center, nearly a year after Germany had abandoned the Molotov–Ribbentrop Pact and invaded the Soviet Union. Major General Vasily Koptsov took command of the formation, which included the 96th and 113th Tank Brigades, the 105th Heavy Tank Brigade, the 17th Motor Rifle Brigade, and the 5th Reconnaissance Battalion. The corps was assigned to the 3rd Tank Army on 25 May, and as of 2 June included 150 tanks, comprising 30 KV tanks, 60 T-34 tanks, and 60 T-60 light tanks. The corps concentrated in the Tula area with the rest of the army, conducting intensive training exercises. After Axis forces launched the Case Blue summer offensive in southern Russia in late June, Stavka believed that an attack by Army Group Centre on the Oryol axis was possible, and ordered the army to concentrate in the Yefremov area. On 6 July, the army was ordered to concentrate to the west in the Chern area, moving closer to the front. The relocation was completed by 9 July, and the 15th Tank Corps was positioned in the area of the Agnichnoye State Farm, Dupny, Bolshoy Kon, Gremyachevo, Yasnyy Lug, and Korotky, where it engaged in combat training and created a defensive line in readiness to repulse a German attack. Late that month, the 96th Brigade was transferred to the Bryansk Front, and it was replaced by the 195th Tank Brigade between 10 and 12 August.

=== Kozelsk Offensive ===
In early August, the 2nd Panzer Army launched a limited offensive towards Sukhinichi in an attempt to eliminate a Soviet salient. The attack was initially successful, but soon bogged down in the face of determined Soviet resistance. To eliminate the penetration and encircle the lead forces of the 2nd Panzer Army, the Kozelsk Offensive was launched by the 3rd Tank Army on the eastern flank of the salient. On 14 August, the order was given to relocate to the Kozelsk area in preparation for the attack; the army began moving the following night, the tanks being transported by rail. The offensive was scheduled to begin on 19 August, but was postponed to 22 August after rains turned the roads to mud, delaying the arrival of the motorized infantry and vehicles from the morning of 16 August to late on 17 August. Railway logistical difficulties resulted in the transfer of personnel and equipment being completed only on 21 August, and cargo only by the end of 24 August. Soviet preparations for the attack were detected by German intelligence, and the German troops in the salient were reinforced and began preparing strong defensive lines. At the beginning of the offensive, the corps was at full strength, with 24 KV tanks, 87 T-34s, and 48 T-60 and 21 T-70 light tanks, a total of 180 tanks.

Actions of the 3rd Tank Army in the Kozelsk Offensive, 22 August 1942

For the attack, Koptsov was placed in command of a group consisting of the 15th Tank Corps and the 154th Rifle Division, reinforced by support units. The group's immediate objective was to advance towards Meshalkino, Myzin, Marino, and Belyi Verkh, then cross the Vytebet River and establish a bridgehead on its west bank. It was afterwards to surround and destroy German troops in the area of Trostyapka, Perestryazh, and Belyi Verkh, operating in conjunction with the 16th and the 61st Armies. On the first day of the attack, the 154th and 264th Rifle Divisions were sent into the attack first, but could not break through. The 12th Tank Corps was committed to the fight, but came under heavy German air attack and was stopped. At 12:00, a report was received that the 3rd Tank Corps had seized Smetskiye Vyselkami and advanced westwards. Considering that the main advance was halted by German resistance, Western Front commander Georgy Zhukov ordered the relocation of the 15th Tank Corps to that sector. The corps was to advance towards Slobodka and Belyi Verkh, but the report of Smetskiye Vyselkami's capture proved to be false, and the 15th's vanguard suffered heavy losses approaching the village. The 105th Heavy Tank Brigade and 17th Motor Rifle Brigade captured Smetskiye Vyselkami from the 56th Infantry Division's 192nd Infantry Regiment in fierce fighting by 17:00, but the corps was unable to make a breakthrough, becoming delayed by difficulties in traversing swampy terrain, getting lost while moving through forest trails, and running into minefields.

Actions of the 3rd Tank Army in the Kozelsk Offensive, 23–27 August 1942

The delays in the advance caused the armor to lag behind the infantry, and the tank columns came under heavy German air attack before reaching the fight on 23 August. For the next two days, the corps advanced slowly alongside other units, overcoming stubborn German resistance, before finally clearing the forests east of the Vytebet River of German troops on 25 August. The corps was unable to cross the river due to the firm German defenses on the other side. The next day, to end German resistance on the left flank, where the attacks of the 12th Tank Corps and 154th Rifle Division were unsuccessful, the corps was ordered to withdraw from the front in the Zhukovo area and reconcentrate in the forest 3 kilometers (1.9 mi) west of Myzin. It was then to capture Sorokino in conjunction with the 12th Tank Corps and 154th Rifle Division. After moving 15 kilometers (9.3 mi) to its new starting positions, the corps attacked at dawn on 26 August, but was again stymied by the forest terrain.

Actions of the 3rd Tank Army in the Kozelsk Offensive, 27–31 August 1942

The same day, the 12th Tank Corps and 264th Rifle Division came under heavy pressure from German tank counterattacks. On 27 August, army commander Prokofy Romanenko, fearing a breakthrough from the south, ordered the 15th Corps to concentrate in the forests north of Novogryn, in readiness to counterattack if a German breakthrough took place. In the event, by the end of the day, the Soviet lines had held and the 15th was not needed in that sector. That night, it was relocated from the Myzin area to the Pakom area, where, together with the 61st Army's 12th Guards Rifle Division, it was to break German resistance near Leonovo, then develop the breakthrough towards Ukolitsa into the rear of the German troops defending against the 154th and 264th Rifle Divisions and the 12th Corps at Bogdanovsky and Goskovo. On the afternoon of 28 August, the corps attacked after a 30-minute artillery bombardment and airstrikes, but was immediately stalled by an anti-tank ditch protected by minefields and artillery. During the night, sappers and motorized infantry managed to create passages through the ditch, but when the offensive was resumed the next morning, the 15th had advanced only 200–300 meters (660–980 ft) before it was stopped by a second anti-tank ditch. It tried to break through during the day, but could not cross the ditch.

On the night of 29/30 August, the corps was pulled out of the line and concentrated in the forest a kilometer south of Meshalkino to carry out an attack on Sorokino in conjunction with the 154th Rifle Division and 12th Tank Corps. The attack was cancelled due to the heavy losses suffered by both the 12th Tank Corps and 154th Rifle Division in the previous fighting, and the 15th also required time to reorganize. During the day the corps' 195th Tank Brigade conducted the only combat action, a successful operation to relieve two encircled battalions of the 61st Army's 156th Rifle Division. While the main forces of the 3rd Tank Army had been fighting at Sorokino, the 3rd Tank Corps had achieved a measure of success, crossed the Vytebet River, and begun fighting to capture Volosovo. As a result, the 15th Corps and the 154th were relocated to the Kumovo area on the right flank, and the 15th was tasked with exploiting the breakthrough to capture Perestryazh.

The renewed attack began on 2 September but was delayed by German air attacks. Meanwhile, a regiment from the 264th Rifle Division proved unable to cross the Vytebet River and capture the village of Ozhigovo, which was necessary for the 15th Corps to exploit the breakthrough. This forced Koptsov to commit the 17th Motor Rifle Brigade and the 113th and 195th Brigades' motor rifle battalions to the battle. The motor rifle units crossed the Vytebet River after a short artillery barrage and captured Ozhigovo by the end of the day. The 195th Brigade's tank battalions moved across the Vytebet River and attacked Perestryazh the next day, but were unable to capture the village because they were first halted by a ravine covered by German artillery, and were then counterattacked on their left flank by 40 German tanks. Although they repulsed the counterattack and destroyed 13 tanks, the 195th's advance was stopped. On 4 September, after the 3rd Tank Corps was pulled out of the line due to losses and the main forces of the 264th arrived to hold Ozhigovo, the 15th's 17th and 113th Brigades were moved to the Volosovo area, having received orders to advance on Trostyanka alongside the 342nd Rifle Division. From 5 to 9 September, the corps attempted to advance, but was repeatedly repulsed, sustaining casualties and suffering fuel and ammunition shortages. The Kozelsk Offensive ended on 9 September with the combined Soviet tank units from all three armies left with only 200 tanks out of the 700 they originally fielded.

=== Interlude ===
The corps was relocated to the forests west of Kaluga beginning on 20 September 1942 after the 3rd Tank Army became part of the Reserve of the Supreme High Command. Around this time, the 17th Motor Rifle Brigade was transferred to another unit, and the 105th Brigade became part of the 5th Tank Army. A few days after arriving in the Kaluga area, Major General Pavel Rybalko replaced Romanenko, who became commander of the 5th Tank Army. The 15th rested and conducted training while refitting with supplies and equipment for the next several months, and was relocated to the Plavsk region on 22 October, remaining there until 26 December. The 88th Tank Brigade joined the corps at the end of November and the 52nd Motor Rifle Brigade joined in mid-December, bringing the corps back up to strength. On 22 December, the corps and the army began relocation to the Kalach and then the Kantemirovka areas, part of the Voronezh Front, to participate in the upcoming Ostrogozhsk–Rossosh Offensive, which was aimed to defeat Axis forces on the Upper Don. From 29 December to 13 January 1943, the corps was unloaded at the Kalach railway station. The relocation of the entire army was completed only on 15 January, due to a shortage of trains and railway congestion.

=== Ostrogozhsk–Rossosh Offensive ===
For the offensive, the corps was reinforced by the 368th Fighter Anti-Tank Artillery Regiment, the 71st Anti-Aircraft Artillery Regiment, and the 47th Engineer Battalion. They were to make a breakthrough on the first day in the area between the advance of the 48th Guards and 184th Rifle Divisions, seizing Yekaterinovka and advancing on Varvarovka and Alexeyevka by the end of the day. The attack was scheduled to begin on 12 January 1943, but was moved back two days owing to railroad delays. By 13 January, 122 tanks from the army—most belonging to the corps' 113th and 195th Brigades—were still delayed by maintenance issues. This was because the Voronezh Front's initial offensive planning mandating that only the 12th Tank Corps would fight in the first attack, which resulted in the new tanks of the 15th being transferred to the 12th and the 12th's worn-out tanks to the 15th, although it was later decided that the entire army would fight in the operation. The 15th therefore had much less time to reorganize in preparation for the assault, and as a result of the 113th and 195th Brigades arriving in the concentration areas on 13 January with only 10 to 12 tanks due to the delays, all of the serviceable tanks were transferred to the 88th Tank Brigade, which was brought up to a strength of 74 tanks. This single brigade constituted the entirety of the corps' armored troops involved in the first day's attack, as the 113th and 195th were placed in army reserve until their tanks arrived.

The corps fought in the offensive from 14 January, tasked with advancing into the Axis rear and linking up with the 40th Army attacking from the north. On the first day, the corps attacked the XXIV Panzer Corps, overrunning its command post and killing its commander during a 20-kilometer (12 mi) advance. After taking Alexandrovka, the corps cut the Rossosh–Alexandrovka–Rovenki highway on 15 January by capturing Yeremovka. According to the 15th Tank Corps' reports, it had killed up to 600 Axis troops, captured 98 prisoners, 17 guns, 10 mortars, and 279 motor vehicles, and disabled five guns and 14 machine guns. This came at a cost of eight killed, 38 wounded, and one tank and three motor vehicles destroyed. The 15th then fought in the area of Olkhovatka and Sheliakino, during which it reported killing up to 950 German troops, capturing 2,100 prisoners, 1,200 motor vehicles, 1,856 rifles, 75 machine guns, 20 guns, and eight tanks. The 15th suffered losses during this period of 11 killed, 41 wounded, and one tank and one armored vehicle disabled. Operating in conjunction with the 12th Tank Corps, the 15th broke through German defenses and on 17 January closed the encirclement ring, linking up with troops from the 40th Army's 305th Rifle Division at Alexeyevka. This cut off the retreat for the Italian Alpini Corps and thousands of Hungarian and German troops. During the action, it reported killing 6,506 Axis troops, capturing 11,168, and capturing or destroying large amounts of artillery, weapons, equipment and transport, while losing 132 killed, 212 wounded, 39 missing, 14 tanks, six guns, two mortars, three armored vehicles, 10 motor vehicles, and six machine guns. Until the end of 25 January, the corps fought in the reduction of the Axis pocket north of Alexeyevka and began reconcentrating on the morning of 29 January. After marching 120 kilometers (75 mi) in two days, it concentrated in the Valuyki area.

=== Operation Star ===
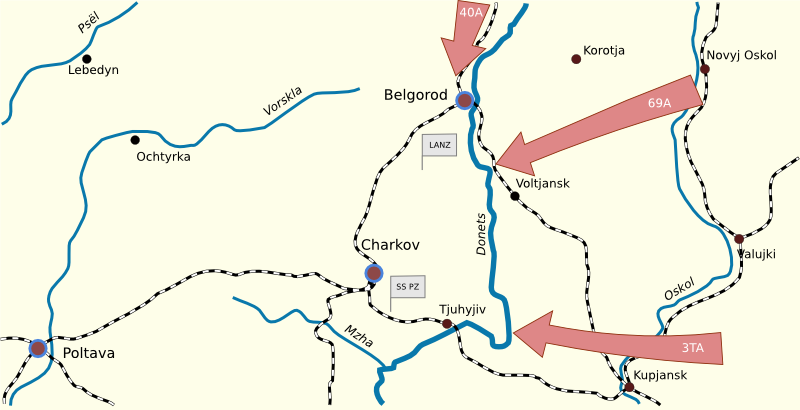
Initial Soviet advance during Operation Star between 2 and 10 February 1943

The corps continued its advance towards Kharkov after the end of the Ostrogozhsk–Rossosh Offensive, against increasingly stiffening resistance from the SS-Panzer Corps. On 2 February, Operation Star began, the corps in the second echelon of the army as it needed refitting. The 15th went into action on 3 February, a day earlier than planned, without its refitting completed, as army commander Lieutenant General Pavel Rybalko quickened the pace of the offensive to prevent German reinforcements establishing a defensive line on the Donets. The 15th Tank Corps advanced with the 160th Rifle Division towards Veliky Burluk and the Donets crossings at Pechengi. The corps crossed the Burlik River on 3 February and the next day captured Veliky Burluk from the 2nd SS Panzer Division Das Reich. At the same time the lead force of the 195th Tank Brigade, advancing 25 kilometers (16 mi) ahead of the remainder of the corps, reached German positions held by the 1st SS Panzer Division Leibstandarte SS Adolf Hitler (LSSAH) opposite Pechengi. The brigade attempted to capture a crossing over the Pechengi with support from the 160th during the evening, but was repulsed with heavy losses. The rest of the 15th Corps and 160th Division arrived there during 5 February, and at first light on 6 February, they attacked after a short artillery bombardment, but were again repulsed. On the night of 9/10 February, the corps and the 160th Division secured the crossing sites and captured Pechengi. The corps reported 650 German soldiers killed during the fighting, at a cost of 350 killed and wounded. The 15th then pursued the retreating units of the LSSAH but the advance was stopped by German defenses at Rogan only 10 kilometers (6.2 mi) east of Kharkov.

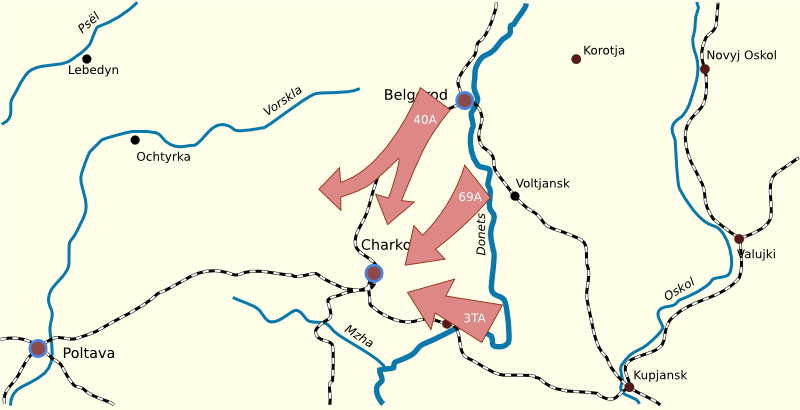
Soviet advance during Operation Star between 10 and 14 February

On 12 February, Rybalko began a new attack with the 15th Corps, 48th Guards Rifle Division, and the 160th attacking the eastern part of Kharkov. They pushed the LSSAH back to the inner defensive line of the city and reached the factory district in the city's eastern suburbs. Two days later, front commander Colonel General Filipp Golikov ordered a final assault, and the corps together with the 160th renewed the attack from the east. They entered eastern Kharkov itself late on 15 February, participating in heavy street fighting with the forces of the Das Reich Division. The city was recaptured the next day, the 88th Tank Brigade taking Dzerzhinsky Square and linking up with the 40th Army's 183rd Rifle Division.

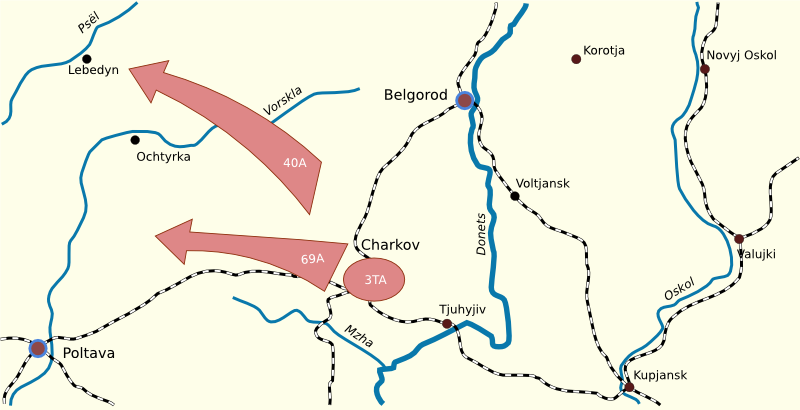
Soviet advance in Operation Star from 14 to 23 February

The 15th then pursued retreating German forces in the direction of Poltava. Late on 16 February, it captured Zalyutino and engaged German troops at Pesochnya on the road to Liubotyn. After capturing Pesochnya two days later, the 15th began the battle for Liubotyn against troops of the Grossdeutschland Division, but became bogged down in heavy fighting for the city. The corps' 195th Tank Brigade and the 160th Division were ordered to bypass the city and attempt to capture Staryi Merchik. On 21 February, they advanced on Liubotyn from the west, and the Grossdeutschland Division began its retreat from the city on the next day. In the battle for Liubotyn between 21 and 22 February, the corps reported killing 400 German soldiers and destroying 12 tanks, while suffering losses of 360 killed and wounded and six tanks.

=== Third Battle of Kharkov ===
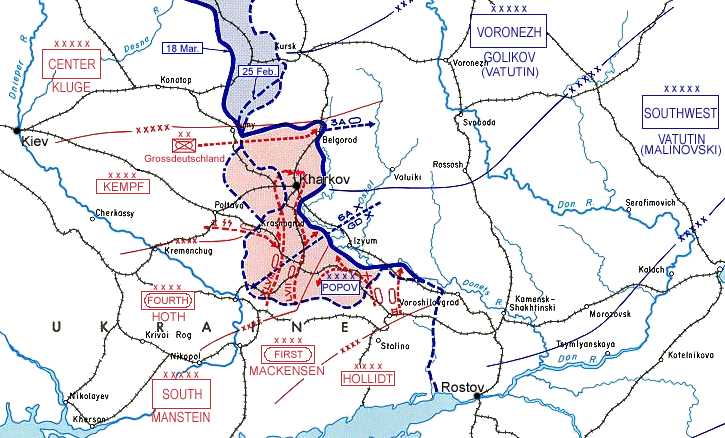
The German advance and Soviet retreat during the Third Battle of Kharkov

On 23 February 1943, German troops from the 4th Panzer Army counterattacked the Southwestern Front troops exploiting the breakthrough to the south of Kharkov, encircling many and forcing the remainder to retreat towards the Donets, beginning the Third Battle of Kharkov. The 3rd Tank Army was ordered to relieve the encircled troops, and the 15th Tank Corps changed direction, advancing towards Krasnograd. During the last days of February, the corps fought in a fierce meeting engagement with the LSSAH and 320th Infantry Division. Operating alongside the 111th Rifle Division, the 15th captured Novaya Vodolaga and on 26 February resumed its advance south, leaving the 195th Brigade to hold Novaya Vodolaga.

By the end of 28 February, in conjunction with the 219th Rifle Division, the corps had captured Kegichevka, at the cost of heavy losses for the 88th Tank Brigade. The 88th was left with three T-34 tanks and two T-70s, and the other brigades were down to similar strength, leaving the entire corps with 19 tanks. Koptsov was severely wounded during the fighting on 28 February, and corps chief of staff Lieutenant Colonel Alexander Lozovsky became acting commander. By 2 March, the corps had been surrounded by the SS Panzer Corps east of Krasnograd and German tanks were in its rear at Lozovaya. Koptsov ordered the corps to defend the area around Kegichevka, the location of its headquarters. The 3rd Tank Army was completely surrounded and could not be relieved as it comprised most of the front's troops. Koptsov ordered a breakout, and a small number of troops with light weapons escaped the encirclement, all of the corps' 25 remaining tanks being lost. Koptsov himself was briefly captured on 2 March before dying of the wound he had received four days earlier.

Meanwhile, the 195th Tank Brigade's commander took command of 32 repaired and recovered tanks from the 12th and 15th Corps at Novaya Vodolaga, defending the town alongside the 253rd Rifle Brigade. There, they withstood three days of attacks from LSSAH until 6 March, when their positions began to be encircled by LSSAH and the SS-Totenkopf Division. During the next few days the brigade retreated north of the Mzha River to Rakitnoye, which was given up on 9 March. The 195th then took up defensive positions in the Ozeryanka area.

=== Operation Kutuzov ===
According to a report by the 3rd Tank Army's headquarters, the 15th Tanks Corps' strength on 14 March 1943 was only 1,000 men. By the following day, the remnants of the 15th had been concentrated in the Belyi Kholodets area, and on 21 March were moved to the Nikitovka, Samarino, and Chepukhino region for rest and refitting. On 31 March the corps was ordered to become part of the Reserve of the Supreme High Command in the Tambov area by 4 April. Instead, by the beginning of May it had been transferred to the Moscow Military District. The corps became part of the new 3rd Guards Tank Army within the month, and Major General Filipp Rudkin took command on 11 June. By 1 July, the corps had been rebuilt to a strength of 209 tanks and 16 self-propelled guns.

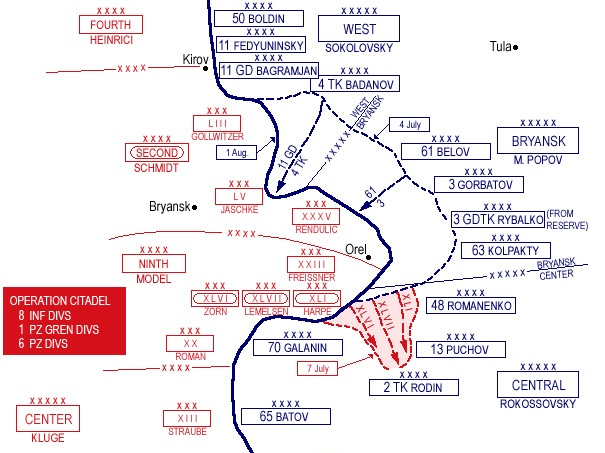
Soviet and German positions during Operation Kutuzov

On 13 July, the corps became part of the Bryansk Front along with its army, and was ordered to concentrate in the Novosil area by the end of 15 July, in preparation for Operation Kutuzov, the Soviet counteroffensive after the Battle of Kursk. After completing a march to its jumping-off point, the corps attacked on the morning of 19 July. The 12th and 15th Tank Corps crossed the Oleshen River in the first echelon of the assault and advanced 12 kilometers (7.5 mi) by the end of the day, aided by artillery and air support. In the evening, the 15th's advance was stopped by the 8th Panzer Division. During the fighting on 19 July, the commander of the 113th Tank Brigade, Leonid Chigin, was killed in action. The strong German resistance during the day reduced the corps to 32 T-34 and 42 T-70 tanks from a strength of 129 T-34s and 68 T-70s at the start of the day.

The following day, the corps shifted northwest to capture Otrada, cutting the Mtsensk–Oryol highway in the Vysokoye area. In the evening, the 52nd Motor Rifle Brigade crossed the Oka River, capturing a bridgehead near Novaya Slobodka. By the end of 21 July, the corps arrived to assist the 12th Tank Corps and the 91st Separate Tank Brigade in the crossing of the Optushka River, delayed by intense German air attacks and tank counterattacks. The next morning, all three units began crossing the river. The 195th Tank Brigade's commander, Vasily Lomakin, was killed in action leading his unit on 22 July. Both Chigin and Lomakin were posthumously awarded the title Hero of the Soviet Union. On 23 July, the German defenses on the Optushka were broken, and the pursuit began. By the end of the day, the corps had reached the line of Semendyaevsky, Karpovsky, Aleksandrovka, Safonovo, and Neplyuevo.

The actions of the offensive had still failed to produce a decisive breakthrough for the army, and on 23 July the attack was shifted south, the 15th being ordered to march to concentration points at Zarya and in the Petrovo area. The march took place on the night of 23/24 July, the troops arriving on the morning of 24 July. The advance was renewed the next day, the 15th in the second echelon behind the 12th Corps. On 26 July 1943, the corps was converted into the 7th Guards Tank Corps simultaneously with the 12th Tank Corps, becoming part of the elite Soviet Guards, in recognition of the "courage and bravery" of its actions in the offensive.

== Commanders ==
The corps' first formation was commanded by the following officer:

- Komdiv Mikhail Petrovich Petrov (1938 – January 1940)

The corps' second formation was commanded by the following officers:

- Major General Vasily Koptsov (21 May 1942 – c. 28 February 1943)
- Colonel Alexander Lozovsky (c. 28 February– 10 June 1943)
- Major General Filipp Rudkin (11 June – 26 July 1943)

== Bibliography ==
=== References ===
- Drig, Yevgeny. "5 механизированный корпус имени т.Калиновского" [5th Mechanized Corps named for Kalinowsky]. mechcorps.rkka.ru (in Russian). Archived from the original on 2 November 2012. – mechcorps.rkka.ru was the website of Russian historian Yevgeny Drig (Russian: Евгений Дриг)
- Drig, Yevgeny (2005). Механизированные корпуса РККА в бою. История автобронетанковых войск Красной Армии в 1940–1941 годах [Red Army Mechanized Corps in battle: The history of the Red Army armored forces 1940–1941] (in Russian). Moscow: Transkniga. ISBN 5-170-24760-5.
- Dunn, Walter S. (2009). Hitler's Nemesis: The Red Army, 1930–45. Mechanicsburg, Pennsylvania: Stackpole. ISBN 978-1-4617-5115-1.
- Forczyk, Robert (2014). Tank Warfare on the Eastern Front 1941–1942: Schwerpunkt. Barnsley, South Yorkshire: Pen & Sword. ISBN 978-1-78159-008-9.
- Forczyk, Robert (2016). Tank Warfare on the Eastern Front 1943–1945: Red Steamroller. Barnsley, South Yorkshire: Pen & Sword. ISBN 978-1-78346-278-0.
- Glantz, David M.; House, Jonathan M. (1999). The Battle of Kursk. Lawrence, Kansas: University Press of Kansas. ISBN 978-0-7006-1335-9.
- Glantz, David M. (2014) [1991]. From the Don to the Dnepr: Soviet Offensive Operations, December 1942 – August 1943. New York: Routledge. ISBN 978-1-135-18130-7.
- Goncharov, Vladislav (2007). "Второй блин комом? Танковые войска в операциях левого крыла Западного фронта (июль-август 1942 года)" [Is the second pancake lumpy? Tank troops in Western Front operations (July–August 1942)]. Танковый прорыв. Советские танки в боях 1937–1942 гг [Tank Breakthrough: Soviet Tanks in Combat, 1937–1942] (in Russian). Moscow: Yauza, Eksmo. ISBN 978-5-699-20460-1.
- Gurkin, V.V.; et al. (1972). Боевой состав Советской армии: Часть III (Январь – декабрь 1943 г.) [Combat Composition of the Soviet Army, Part III (January–December 1943)] (PDF) (in Russian). Moscow: Voenizdat.
- Habeck, Mary R. (2003). Storm of Steel: The Development of Armor Doctrine in Germany and the Soviet Union, 1919–1939. Ithaca, New York: Cornell University Press. ISBN 978-0-8014-4074-8.
- Isaev, Alexei (2004). "Битва за Харьков. февраль – март 1943" [The Battle of Kharkov, February–March 1943]. Фронтовая иллюстрация [Front illustrated] (in Russian). No. 6. Moscow: Strategia KM.
- Magnuski, Janusz; Kolomiets, Maxim (1994). Czerwony blitzkrieg, wrzesień 1939: sowieckie wojska pancerne w Polsce [Red Blitzkrieg, September 1939: Soviet Armored Troops in Poland] (in Polish). Warsaw: Pelta. ISBN 978-83-85314-03-5.
- Main Personnel Directorate of the Ministry of Defense of the Soviet Union (1964). Командование корпусного и дивизионного звена советских вооруженных сил периода Великой Отечественной войны 1941–1945 гг [Commanders of Corps and Divisions in the Great Patriotic War, 1941–1945] (in Russian). Moscow: Frunze Military Academy.
- Maslov, Alexander (2001). Captured Soviet Generals: The Fate of Soviet Generals Captured by the Germans, 1941–1945. London: Frank Cass. ISBN 978-0-7146-5124-8.
- Meltyukhov, Mikhail (2001). Советско-польские войны. Военно-политическое противостояние 1918–1939 гг [Soviet–Polish War: Military and Political Confrontation 1918–1939] (in Russian). Moscow: Veche. ISBN 978-5-7838-0951-4.
- Pavlov, M.V.; Pavlov, I.V.; Zheltov, I.G. (1999). Танки БТ. Часть 3. Колёсно-гусеничный танк БТ-7 [BT Tanks, Part 3: Wheeled-Tracked Tank BT-7]. Армада №17 [Armada No. 17] (in Russian). Moscow: Eksprint.
- Shein, Dmitry (2007). Танки ведет Рыбалко. Боевой путь 3-й Гвардейской танковой армии [Rybalko's Tanks Lead: Combat Path of the 3rd Guards Tank Army]. Красная армия. Элитные войска [Red Army Elite Troops] (in Russian). Moscow: Yauza/Eksmo. ISBN 978-5-699-20010-8. Archived from the original on 2019-06-19.
- Shkadov, Ivan, ed. (1987). Герои Советского Союза: краткий биографический словарь [Heroes of the Soviet Union: A Brief Biographical Dictionary] (in Russian). Vol. 1. Moscow: Voenizdat.
- Shkadov, Ivan, ed. (1988). Герои Советского Союза: краткий биографический словарь [Heroes of the Soviet Union: A Brief Biographical Dictionary] (in Russian). Vol. 2. Moscow: Voenizdat. ISBN 978-5-203-00536-6.
- Zaloga, Steven J.; Ness, Leland S. (1998). Red Army Handbook 1941–1945. Phoenix Mill: Sutton Publishing. ISBN 978-0-7509-1740-7.
- Zolotaryov, Vladimir, ed. (1999). Русский архив: Великая Отечественная. Ставка ВГК: Документы и материалы. 1943 год [Russian Archive: The Great Patriotic War: Stavka VGK: Documents and Materials for 1943] (in Russian). Moscow: TERRA. ISBN 978-5-300-02007-1.
- Zvartsev, Alexander, ed. (1982). 3-я гвардейская танковая. Боевой путь 3-й гвардейской танковой армии [3rd Guards Tank: Combat Path of the 3rd Guards Tank Army] (in Russian). Moscow: Voenizdat. OCLC 9829836.
