= Alexander Lozovsky =

- Native name: Александр Борисович Лозовский
- Born: 23 September 1907; Golenishchevo village, Krasninsky Uyezd, Smolensk Governorate, Russian Empire
- Died: 26 February 1981 (aged 73) Moscow, Soviet Union
- Buried: Kuntsevo Cemetery
- Allegiance: Soviet Union
- Branch: Red Army (later Soviet Army)
- Service years: 1925–1966
- Rank: Major general
- Commands: 15th Tank Corps
- Conflicts: Sino-Soviet conflict; Battles of Khalkhin Gol; World War II
- Awards: Order of Lenin; Order of the Red Banner (5); Order of Suvorov, 2nd class; Order of Kutuzov, 2nd class; Order of the Patriotic War, 1st class; Order of the Red Star

Alexander Borisovich Lozovsky (Russian: Александр Борисович Лозовский; 23 September 1907 – 26 February 1981) was a Soviet Army major general.

Lozovsky served in the Red Army from the mid-1920s, initially serving as a junior officer and fighting in the Sino-Soviet conflict in 1929. He became an armor officer in the 1930s and served at the Battles of Khalkhin Gol. After the beginning of Operation Barbarossa, the German invasion of the Soviet Union, on 22 June 1941, Lozovsky became chief of staff of a tank division before becoming chief of staff of the 15th Tank Corps in mid-1942. After the corps commander was killed in the Third Battle of Kharkov, Lozovsky temporarily took command of the corps. He continued to serve as chief of staff of the unit when it became the 7th Guards Tank Corps, and transferred to the same position with the 10th Guards Tank Corps in 1944. Postwar, he served as a department head in the Main Personnel Directorate of the Ministry of Defense of the Soviet Union.

== Early life and interwar military career ==
Lozovsky was born on 23 September 1907 in the village of Goloenishchevo, Smolensk Governorate. He was drafted into the Red Army on 14 September 1925, and was sent to study at the Western Military District Military-Political Academy, but was transferred to the Unified Military School named for the Central Executive Committee in Moscow in October 1926, where he became a section leader in September 1927. Upon graduation in September 1928, Lozovsky was sent to the 1st Pacific Rifle Division's 1st Chita Rifle Regiment, stationed in the Soviet Far East with the Special Red Banner Far Eastern Army, where he served as a platoon commander. From July 1929 to January 1930, he participated in the Sino-Soviet conflict over control of the Chinese Eastern Railway. In July, he became an assistant company commander for technical affairs.

In November 1930, Lozovsky was sent to study at the Leningrad Armored Refresher Courses for Red Army commanders. After completing the course, he became a company commander of the 1st Separate Tank Battalion in the Ukrainian Military District. Transferred to the Far East in February 1934, Lozovsky became the assistant chief of the 2nd Mechanized Brigade's operations staff department. In November, he entered the Military Academy of Mechanization and Motorization of the Red Army, graduating in June 1939. Lozovsky then returned to the Far East, where he was appointed assistant chief of staff of the 9th Armored Motor Brigade, fighting in the Battles of Khalkhin Gol as part of the 1st Army Group.

== World War II ==
In July 1941, Lozovsky became chief of staff of the newly formed 111th Tank Division, part of the Transbaikal Military District, which became the Transbaikal Front in September. He subsequently took accelerated courses at the Higher Military Academy and in June 1942 became chief of the operations department of the newly formed 15th Tank Corps. In July, Lozovsky became the corps' chief of staff, fighting in the Ostrogozhsk–Rossosh Offensive, Operation Star, and the Third Battle of Kharkov between January and March 1943. During Operation Star, the corps suffered heavy losses in personnel and equipment and shifted to the defense after a German counterattack began the Third Battle of Kharkov. The German counterattack cut off the corps from main forces in the Sokolovo area, and it was ordered to break out through Novaya Vodolaga. After corps commander Major General Vasily Koptsov died on 3 March, Lozovsky took command of the corps and led the breakout in the area of Zmiiv.

Lozovsky supervised the rebuilding of the corps during the next months, while simultaneously being both corps commander and chief of staff. On 11 June, Major General Filipp Rudkin arrived to take command of the corps, and Lozovsky reverted to being the chief of staff. In July, the corps fought in Operation Kutuzov, the Soviet counteroffensive after the Battle of Kursk. During the fighting, Lozovsky was wounded but continued to perform his duties and was awarded the Order of Kutuzov 2nd class for "efficient organization, skilled command of the unit, and fulfillment of combat missions". At the end of the month, the corps was converted into the 7th Guards Tank Corps for its actions. He continued to serve as chief of staff of the corps during the Battle of the Dnieper and the Battle of Kiev. On 18 February 1944, Lozovsky transferred to become chief of staff of the 10th Guards Tank Corps. With the 10th Guards Corps, he fought in the Proskurov-Chernivtsi Offensive, the Lvov–Sandomierz Offensive, the Lower Silesian Offensive, the Upper Silesian Offensive, the Berlin Offensive, and the Prague Offensive.

== Postwar ==
On 27 June 1945, Lozovsky was promoted to major general, and on 22 May 1946, he became head of the personnel section of the Armored and Mechanized Forces of the Ground Forces Main Personnel Directorate. He became head of the directorate's Directorate of Personnel Service's 3rd Department on 15 July 1947. On 14 April 1949, Lozovsky became the directorate's head of inspection, and from 15 April 1950 was at the disposal of the directorate. From 6 to 14 July, he attended higher academic courses at the Military Academy of the General Staff, then was at the disposal of the commander of the armored and mechanized forces. From 11 September, Lozovsky served as acting head of inspection, and on 20 December 1952 became deputy head of the 3rd Department. On 6 May 1953, he became head of the department, and on 19 May 1955 was transferred to lead the directorate's awards department. On 28 September 1961 he became the head of the officer assignments department, retiring on 27 June. After the end of the war, Lozovsky served in the Main Personnel Directorate of the Ministry of Defense as head of the department of promotions and awards. He retired on 27 June 1966 and lived in Moscow. Lozovsky died on 26 February 1981 and was buried at the Kuntsevo Cemetery.

== Awards and honors ==
Order of Lenin (15 November 1950)
Order of the Red Banner, five times (17 November 1939, 23 May 1943, 17 July 1944, 6 November 1945, 30 December 1956)
Order of Suvorov, 2nd class (10 January 1944)
Order of Kutuzov, 2nd class (25 May 1945)
Order of the Patriotic War, 1st class (8 April 1943)
Order of the Red Star (3 November 1944)
Medal "For the Liberation of Prague" (1945)
Medal "For the Capture of Berlin" (1945)
Medal "For the Victory over Germany in the Great Patriotic War 1941–1945" (1945)
Jubilee Medal "Twenty Years of Victory in the Great Patriotic War 1941-1945" (1965)
Jubilee Medal "Thirty Years of Victory in the Great Patriotic War 1941–1945" (1975)
Jubilee Medal "In Commemoration of the 100th Anniversary of the Birth of Vladimir Ilyich Lenin" (1969)
Medal "Veteran of the Armed Forces of the USSR" (1976)
Jubilee Medal "XX Years of the Workers' and Peasants' Red Army" (1938)
Jubilee Medal "30 Years of the Soviet Army and Navy" (1948)
Jubilee Medal "40 Years of the Armed Forces of the USSR" (1958)
Jubilee Medal "50 Years of the Armed Forces of the USSR" (1968)
Jubilee Medal "60 Years of the Armed Forces of the USSR" (1978)
Medal "In Commemoration of the 800th Anniversary of Moscow" (1947)
War Cross 1939–1945 (Czechoslovakia)
