= Tank corps (Soviet Union) =

World War II Soviet military formation

A tank corps (Russian: танковый корпус) was a type of Soviet armoured formation used during World War II.

== Pre-war development of Soviet mechanized forces ==
In Soviet Russia, the so-called armored forces (броневые силы) preceded the Tank Corps. They consisted of the motorized armored units (автобронеотряды) made of armored vehicles and armored trains. The country did not have its own tanks during the Civil War of 1918–1920.

In January 1918, the Red Army established the Soviet of Armored Units (Совет броневых частей, or Центробронь), later renamed to Central Armored Directorate and then once again to Chief Armored Directorate (Главное броневое управление). In December 1920, the Red Army received its first light tanks, assembled at the Krasnoye Sormovo Factory. In 1928, it began the production of the MS-1 tanks (Малый Сопровождения -1, where M stands for "small" and S – for "convoy"). In 1929, it established the Central Directorate for Mechanization and Motorization of the Workers’ and Peasants’ Red Army. Tanks became a part of the mechanised corps at this point.

During this time, and based on the experience of the Civil War with its sweeping movements of horse-mobile formations, Soviet military theorists such as Vladimir Triandafillov and Konstantin Kalinovsky elaborated the principles of combat use of armored units, which envisioned a large-scale use of tanks in different situations in cooperation with various army units. In the mid-1930s, these ideas found their reflection in the so-called Deep Operation and deep combat theories. From the second half of the 1920s, tank warfare development took place at Kazan, where the German Reichswehr was allowed to participate.

In 1930, the First Mechanised Brigade had its tank regiment of 110 tanks. In 1932, the first Mechanised Corps had over 500 tanks, and it was probably the first armoured unit of operational significance anywhere in the world. That same year, the Red Army established the Military Academy of Mechanisation and Motorisation of the Workers’ and Peasants’ Red Army (which became the Malinovskiy Mechanised Force Academy and is today part of the Combined Arms Academy of the Armed Forces of the Russian Federation).

In 1931–1935, the Red Army adopted light, medium, and later heavy tanks of different types. By the beginning of the 1936, it had already had four mechanised corps, six separate mechanised brigades, six separate tank regiments, fifteen mechanised regiments within cavalry divisions and considerable number of tank battalions and companies. The creation of mechanised and tank units marked the dawn of a new branch of armed forces, which would be called armored forces. In 1937, the Central Directorate of Mechanisation and Motorisation was renamed to Directorate of Automated Armored Units (Автобронетанковое управление) and then to Chief Directorate of Automated Armored Units (Главное автобронетанковое управление, Габту, GABTU). Soviet armored units gained some combat experience during the Battle of Lake Khasan (1938), Battle of Khalkhin Gol (1939) and Winter War with Finland (1939–1940).

In August 1938, the four mechanised corps were converted into tank corps. Each was authorized 12,710 men, between 560 and 600 tanks, and 118 artillery pieces. The corps included two light tank brigades (equipped with BT and T-26 tanks), a motor rifle and machine gun brigade, and a communications battalion. The 5th Mechanized Corps became the 15th Tank Corps, the 7th Mechanized Corps became the 10th Tank Corps, the 11th Mechanized Corps became the 20th Tank Corps, and the 45th Mechanized Corps became the 25th Tank Corps.

In the summer of 1939, all three brigades of the 20th Tank Corps were detached from the corps and sent into combat during the Battles of Khalkhin Gol. The 15th and 25th Tank Corps fought in the Soviet invasion of Poland in September 1939. As a result of the Soviet assessment of the tank corps as being unwieldy and difficult to control, shown by repeated traffic jams caused by the tank corps in Poland, the Main Military Council ordered their disbandment on 21 November, replacing the tank corps with 15 motorized divisions, each with two motorized rifle regiments, an artillery regiment, and a tank regiment. The tank corps were not actually disbanded until January 1940, by which time the 10th Tank Corps had seen brief service in the Winter War in December 1939.

Besides the operational armoured and mechanised formations, separate tank battalions within rifle divisions existed. These were meant to reinforce rifle units for the purpose of breaching enemy defenses. They had to act in cooperation with the infantry without breaking away from it and were called tanks for immediate infantry support (танки непосредственной поддержки пехоты).

With the fall of France, the People's Commissariat for Defense authorized formation of new mechanized corps. Unlike the corps formed in the 30's (which consisted of brigades), these corps (with over 1000 tanks each on paper) would consist of two tank and one mechanized division plus support units (Red Army Handbook 1939–1945, Zaloga and Ness, pp. 65–68). These would be the armored formations which would attempt counter strikes against the German invasion. The performance of these corps was generally not good and they were officially disbanded in mid-July, 1941 (Ibid., p. 70). Additional information on these formations can also be found in Soviet Order of Battle World War II, Vol. I, by Charles C. Sharp.

== Eastern Front of World War II ==
On 31 March 1942, orders were given for the reformation of the tank corps, as a result of the Soviet need for massed armored units so that the small tank brigades, which were now the basic armored formation, could be capable of decisive actions. The 1st, 2nd, 3rd, and 4th Tank Corps were to consist of a headquarters, two tank brigades, and a motor rifle brigade, authorized a total of 5,603 men with 20 KV heavy tanks, 40 T-34 medium tanks, and 40 T-60 or T-70 light tanks. The new tank corps lacked artillery, reconnaissance and engineer units, and rear support elements, although its component brigades included such formations. They were the equivalent of small Western armored divisions. The motor rifle brigade was a new unit type intended to retain captured positions and to neutralize enemy infantry and anti-tank weapons.

It was determined that this was too weak, and a third tank brigade was added to increase the offensive power. The final organisation as published in 1944 included an additional heavy tank or heavy self-propelled gun regiment, plus a medium and a light self-propelled gun regiment.

A total of 31 tank corps were formed during the war, with 12 of them earning the designation of a Guards Tank Corps. Due to the destruction of the 21st Tank Corps at the Second Battle of Kharkov and the use of some tank corps to form mechanised corps, no more than 24 of them actually saw combat.

The tank corps were the basic building block of the Tank Armies (see List of Soviet armies#Tank Armies).

Most tank corps were converted to Tank Divisions in 1945–6. See List of Soviet Army divisions 1989-91.

=== List of tank corps (1941–1945) ===
- 1st Tank Corps
- 2nd Tank Corps
- 3rd Tank Corps – renamed 9th Guards Tank Corps after Battle of Radzymin (1944).
- 4th Tank Corps – March 1942 – February 1943 – converted to 5th Guards Tank Corps
- 5th Tank Corps – formed April 1942. Equipped largely with British-built Valentine tanks, 5 TC was badly handled in the early stages of the 1943 Smolensk operation, being mauled both from the air and from the ground. However the deflection of German units necessitated by the sacrifice of 5 TC meant that Spas Demensk fell on 13 August 1943.
- 6th Tank Corps – see 11th Guards Tank Corps
- 7th Tank Corps - by a Prikaz of the NKO USSR No. 413 of 29 December 1942 the 7th Tank Corps became the 3rd Guards Tank Corps.
- 8th Tank Corps – Formed May 1942 in the Moscow Military District. Assigned to Western Front for virtually its entire career. After being nearly destroyed the brigades were reassigned and the Corps HQs used to form 3rd Mechanized Corps in September 1943.
- 9th Tank Corps – the 9th Tank Division can trace its history back to 12 May 1942 when the 9th Tank Corps (ru:9-й танковый корпус (СССР)) was formed in the Moscow Military District. It took part in the Battle of Kursk, then across Ukraine with the Central, Belorussian, and 1st Belorussian Fronts. It ended the war in Berlin. As part of the occupation forces, it was assigned to the 1st Guards Tank Army (also 1st Guards Mechanised Army). In 1957, it was reorganized into a Heavy Tank Division and re-designated the 13th Heavy Tank Division. This lasted until 1965, when it was returned to its original 9th Tank Division designation. This it retained until its withdrawal from the GDR in 1991 when it was disbanded. Its divisional headquarters was at Riesa.
- 10th Tank Corps (Soviet Union)
- 11th Tank Corps
- 12th Tank Corps
- 13th Tank Corps – began in April 1942 with 65th, 85th, and 88th Tank Brigades and 20th Motor Rifle(?) Brigade. In July 1942 brigades assigned were the 85th, 158th, and 167th Tank and 20th Motor Rifle(?) Brigade. It was "an oddball in the Soviet Army. 13th Tank Corps had been so shot up that most of its tank brigades were removed in September–October 1942, and when Mechanised Brigades were substituted at the beginning of November, it should have been redesignated as a Mechanised Corps with a new number, as had happened to other tank corps in similar situations. Instead, the corps retained the number '13' and even the Soviet sources get confused on what to call it: a tank corps or a mechanised corps. It had the subordinate units of a mechanised corps when it went into battle in late November and December 1942. It fought as a mechanised corps with 57th, 51st and 2nd Guards Armies during December in the mobile battles against German Panzers south of Stalingrad, and in recognition of its actions there on 9 January 1943 the 13th Mechanised Corps was redesignated as the 4th Guards Mechanised Corps." See 13th Tank Corps. Later 4th Guards Mechanised Division, and 4th Guards Motor Rifle Division.
- 14th Tank Corps
- 15th Tank Corps – Formed May 1942, became 7th Guards Tank Corps July 1943.
- 16th Tank Corps – was part of 2nd Tank Army on formation. Became 12th Guards Tank Corps (1943) and 12th Guards Tank Division (1946).
- 17th Tank Corps – became 4th Guards Tank Corps after Operation Little Saturn.
- 18th Tank Corps
- 19th Tank Corps
- 20th Tank Corps – the 20th Tank Division can trace its history back to 12 December 1942 when the 20th Tank Corps was formed in the Moscow Defense Zone. It took part in the counter-offensives in the winter of 1942/43 and the summer 1943 offensives in the southern Ukraine. After taking part in the offensives in 1944 and early 1945, it was in the Reserve of the Supreme High Command when the war ended. It was allocated to the Northern Group of Forces by Directive No. 11096, where it remained through the Cold War. In later 1945, it was reorganized into the 20th Tank Division. Between 1949 and 1955, it was known as the 7th Tank Division, although as a cadre unit. In 1955, it was restored to full strength and renamed the 20th Tank Division. It would remain in southern Poland until 1991 when it was disbanded.
- 21st Tank Corps
- 22nd Tank Corps
- 23rd Tank Corps - became 23rd Tank Division, Ovruch, Zhitomir Oblast, Carpathian Military District in July 1945.
- 24th Tank Corps
- 25th Tank Corps – formed June 1942 in the Moscow Defence Zone. Originally formed previously as 25th Mechanised Corps in Kiev MD, 1941. Participated in the 'Liberation of Western Ukraine” and fought at Stalingrad, Kursk, Belgorod-Kharkov, Zhitimir-Berdichev, Rovno-Lutsk, Lvov, Vistula-Oder, Czestochowa, Berlin, Prague and other operations and actions. Converted to 25th Tank Division after the end of the war. Postwar assignment to 4th Guards Mechanised Army in the 1940s and 1950s; Withdrawn From Group of Soviet Forces, Germany/ Western Group of Forces, 20th Guards Army. Regiments (formerly brigades) designated “Novgorod.” Deactivation site: Kiev MD.
- 26th Tank Corps
- 27th Tank Corps – formed in the Moscow Defense Zone. The 27th was never committed to combat, but instead on 8 September 1942 it was reorganized into the 1st Mechanised Corps.
- 28th Tank Corps
- 29th Tank Corps
- 30th Tank Corps
- 31st Tank Corps – eventually became 31st Tank Division. Raised in the Moscow Military District, 1943. Associated with 1st Tank Army. Participated in fighting at Kursk, Belgorod-Kharkov, Lvov-Sandomir, Carpathian-Dukla, Sandomir bridgehead, Vistula-Oder, Prague and other operations and actions. Withdrawn From Central Group of Forces, Czechoslovakia. Eventually amalgamated with 47th Guards Tank Division at Mulino to become 3rd Motor Rifle Division after the fall of the Soviet Union.

=== Guards tank corps ===
- 1st Guards Tank Corps
- 2nd Guards Tank Corps
- 3rd Guards Tank Corps
- 4th Guards Tank Corps – now 4th Guards Tank Division
- 5th Guards Tank Corps
- 6th Guards Tank Corps – Raised in the Baltic MD, 1941, re-formed in Moscow MD, 1942. Formed as 12th Tank Corps and successively redesignated as 6th Guards Tank Corps (1943) and 6th Guards Tank Division (1946). Participated in fighting at Ostrogozhsk, Rossosh, Kharkov, Krasnograd, Orel and other operations and actions. Past-war assignment to 3rd Guards Mechanized Army in the 1940s and 1950s. Honorifics and Awards included "Kiev" and “Berlin.” Orders of Lenin, Red Banner, Suvorov and Bogdan Khmelnitsky. Withdrawn from Group of Soviet Forces in Germany, 1st Guards Tank Army in 1982. Now 6th Guards Kiev-Berlin Mechanised Brigade of the Armed Forces of Belarus.
- 7th Guards Tank Corps – Withdrawn from Group of Soviet Forces in Germany Western Group of Forces, 1st Guards Tank Army. Formed in Moscow MD, 1942. Initially designated as 15th Tank Corps, becoming successively the 7th Guards Tank Corps (1943) and 7th Guards Tank Division (1946). Participated in "Liberation of Western Ukraine" and fighting at Ostrogozhsk, Rossosh, Kharkov, Orel and other operations and actions. Postwar assignment to 3rd Guards Mechanised Army in the 1940s and 1950s. Honorifics and Awards: "Kiev." "Berlin," Order of Lenin, Twice Red Banner, Suvorov and Kutuzov. Deactivated in the Moscow MD.
- 8th Guards Tank Corps
- 9th Guards Tank Corps – 3rd Tank Corps was formed at Tula in the Moscow Military District. It took part in the winter counter-offensives in 1942/1943, the Battle of Kursk, then across Ukraine and then the summer offensive in 1944, Operation Bagration, with the Central, Belorussian, and 1st Belorussian Fronts. On 20 November 1944, after the Battle of Radzymin, it was awarded ‘Guards’ status and re-designated the 9th Guards Tank Corps.
- 10th Guards Tank Corps: ex 30th Tank Corps. Now 10th Guards Uralsko-Lvovskaya Tank Division.
- 11th Guards Tank Corps – The 11th Guards Tank Division can trace its history back to 10 April 1942 when the 6th Tank Corps was formed in the Moscow Defense Zone. It took part in the Battle of Kursk, then across Ukraine with the Central, Belorussian, and 1st Belorussian Fronts. On 23 October 1943, it was awarded ‘Guards’ status and redesignated the 11th Guards Tank Corps. It ended the war in the Berlin area. As part of the occupation forces, it was reorganized as the 11th Guards Tank Division and assigned to the 1st Guards Tank Army (also called 1st Guards Mechanised Army during 1946–1957). For the occupation period and post-war era, it was mainly uneventful until 1968 when it took part in the invasion of Czechoslovakia. In 1992 it was withdrawn from Germany and landed in Slonim the newly independent Belarus. It would eventually be reorganized into the 11th Guards Mechanised Brigade. Division Headquarters was at Dresden in the 1980s.
- 12th Guards Tank Corps – former 16th Tank Corps. 16 TC was formed on 1 June 1942 in the Moscow Defense Zone. On 20 November 1944, it was awarded ‘Guards’ status and re-designated the 12th Guards Tank Corps. In later 1945, it was reorganized into the 12th Guards Tank Division.

=== Composition of a tank corps ===
- 29 May 1942
  - Corps HQ
    - Signal Company
    - AAMG (anti-aircraft machine gun) Section
  - Heavy Tank Brigade with KV-1 or KV-2 tanks (Replaced by a third 'medium' tank brigade in July 1942)
  - 2 (Medium) Tank Brigades with two battalions of T-34 and one of T-70 tanks each.
  - Motorized Rifle Brigade
  - Anti-aircraft Battalion
  - Guards Mortar Battalion with Katyusha rocket launchers
  - Motorcycle Battalion (for reconnaissance)
  - Engineer-Mine Company
  - Truck Company
  - Motorized Vehicle Repair Battalion
  - Armored Vehicle Repair Battalion
  - Snipers

== See also ==
- Cavalry corps (Soviet Union)
- Mechanised corps (Soviet Union)
- Rifle corps (Soviet Union)

== Books ==
- David Glantz, The Initial Period of War on the Eastern Front, 22 June – August 1941, 19
- Page, J. and Bean, Tim 'Russian Tanks of World War II', Zenith Press
- Charles Sharp, Soviet Order of Battle in World War II Vol 1: The Deadly Beginning: Soviet Tank, Mechanized, Motorized Divisions and Tank Brigades of 1940–1942,

== Internet sites ==
- Charles Sharp Book on Soviet armoured tactics
- Conversion dates for Guards Tank Corps (in Russian)
- Graphic showing OOB of a 1943 Tank Corps
