= Kozelsk offensive =

Battle of the Eastern Front, World War II

- Part of the Eastern Front of World War II
Date	22 August 1942 – 9 September 1942 (2 weeks and 4 days)
Location	southwestern Kaluga Oblast, Soviet Union
Result	Soviet offensive defeated

Belligerents
Soviet Union	Germany

Commanders and leaders
(Soviet Union) Georgy Zhukov; (Soviet Union) Prokofy Romanenko; (Soviet Union) Ivan Bagramyan; (Soviet Union) Pavel Belov	(Nazi Germany) Rudolf Schmidt

Units involved
3rd Tank Army; 16th Army; 61st Army; 1st Guards Cavalry Corps	2nd Panzer Army

Strength
218,000 men About 700 tanks	About 200 tanks and assault guns

Casualties and losses
12,134 killed; 22,415 wounded; 500 tanks	Unknown

The Kozelsk offensive (Russian: Козельская наступательная операция) was an offensive conducted by parts of the Red Army's Western Front against the German 2nd Panzer Army in southwestern Kaluga Oblast on the Eastern Front of World War II between 22 August and 9 September 1942.

The attack of the 2nd Panzer Army in early August created a small salient in the Soviet line. The Western Front sent the 3rd Tank Army, with the 16th and 61st Armies and the 1st Guards Cavalry Corps as support, to launch an attack to cut off the German troops in the salient. The Soviet offensive bogged down in the face of unfavorable terrain and German defenses and air superiority. Although the three armies managed to reduce the size of the salient by around 9 kilometers (5.6 mi), they suffered heavy losses, especially in tanks. The offensive failed to achieve its objective, but tied down German armored units in a secondary sector.

== Background ==
=== Operation Wirbelwind ===
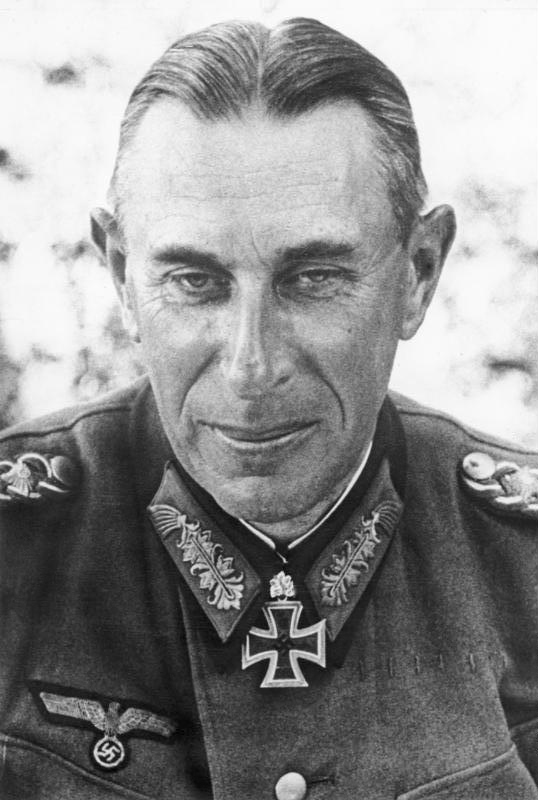
Rudolf Schmidt, commander of the 2nd Panzer Army, in 1942

The German 2nd Panzer Army, commanded by Rudolf Schmidt, launched Operation Wirbelwind, an attack meant to shorten Army Group Centre's frontline by cutting off and defeating the Soviet troops of the 10th and 16th Armies stationed in the Kirov and Sukhinichi salient, on 11 August. The original attack plan would have involved a simultaneous advance of the 2nd Panzer Army form the south and the 4th Army from the north, which was to cut off the salient at its base. However, the first Rzhev–Sychyovka offensive operation, a Soviet attack that began in late July 1942, forced the relocation of most of the 4th Army to reinforce the defense of Rzhev. At the insistence of Army Group Centre commander Günther von Kluge, the offensive took place despite this, and the attack was made with only the forces of the 2nd Panzer Army. The 2nd Panzer Army's tank spearhead force, the 9th and 11th Panzer Divisions, ran into the 16th Army's fortified defensive lines, and the 9th and 19th Panzer Divisions were halted after crossing the Zhizdra River. The 2nd Panzer Army in Wirbelwind captured the village of Ulyanovo and created a 25-kilometer (16 mi) salient in the Soviet line, surrounding and destroying forward elements of three rifle divisions.

=== Soviet plans ===
The Kozelsk offensive aimed to eliminate the entirety of the German penetration and the 2nd Panzer Army by isolating the salient with a combined attack by the 16th, 61st, and 3rd Tank Armies of Georgy Zhukov's Western Front. Prokofy Romanenko's 3rd Tank Army, reinforced with additional infantry and tank units, would launch the main assault from the Belev area southeast of Kozelsk, cross the Vytebet River, and capture Ulyanovo in the German rear, with Pavel Belov's 61st Army following behind. Meanwhile, Ivan Bagramyan's 16th Army, spearheaded by the mobile forces of Alexey Kurkin's 9th and Vasily Burkov's 10th Tank Corps, and Viktor Baranov's 1st Guards Cavalry Corps, was to attack from positions southwest of Kozelsk and destroy the German defenses along the Zhizdra. Continuing their advance, Bagramyan's troops were to link up with those of Romanenko and Belov at Ulyanovo to complete the encirclement of the 2nd Panzer Army.

== Comparison of forces ==
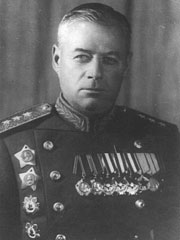
3rd Tank Army commander Prokofy Romanenko, post-1944

The 3rd Tank Army, which had not yet seen combat, included the Semyon Bogdanov's 12th and Vasily Koptsov's 15th Tank Corps, as well as the 179th Separate Tank Brigade, and the 154th and 264th Rifle Divisions. Immediately before the beginning of the offensive, the 1st Guards Motor Rifle Division, four regiments of artillery from the Reserve of the Supreme High Command (RVGK), two Guards mortar (Katyusha rocket launcher) regiments, two anti-tank fighter regiments, and five anti-aircraft artillery regiments, as well as other units. The army amounted to 60,852 men and 436 tanks, including 48 KV tanks, 223 T-34 tanks, three T-50 light tanks, and 162 T-60 and T-70 light tanks, as well as 168 armored cars. The artillery strength of the army included 677 guns and mortars, including 124 45 mm anti-tank guns, as well as 61 37 mm anti-aircraft guns and 72 Katyushas. Romanenko's army was further reinforced by Dmitry Mostovenko's 3rd Tank Corps with 78 tanks and other units from the northern group of the 16th Army.

The 16th Army was composed of nine rifle divisions, three cavalry divisions, four separate rifle brigades, seven tank brigades, one fighter anti-tank brigade, two tank battalions, three artillery regiments from the RVGK, five anti-tank artillery regiment, seven Guards mortar battalions, and two mortar regiments. However, the army's shock group consisted of the 322nd Rifle Division and two cavalry divisions, the 2nd and 7th Guards, while the rest of the units were concentrated on the army's center and right flank. The 16th Army's 9th and 10th Tank Corps amounted to roughly 100 tanks, for a total of around 700 tanks involved in the offensive. The 61st Army's southern group included two rifle divisions, three rifle brigades, a fighter anti-tank brigade, two tank brigades, and three artillery regiments from the RVGK. The three Soviet armies fielded a total of 218,000 troops.

Against them, the 2nd Panzer Army could muster Heinrich Clößner's LIII Army Corps, Josef Harpe's XXXXI Panzer Corps, and XXXV Army Corps, consisting of the 296th, 293rd, 134th, 52nd, 56th, and 26th Infantry Divisions, the 11th, 17th, 9th, and 20th Panzer Divisions, and the 25th Motorized Division. The German forces had roughly 200 tanks and assault guns between them, which meant that they were outnumbered by more than 3:1 in armored strength.

== Prelude ==
The 3rd Tank Army moved its tanks to Kozelsk by rail from the Tula area between 15 and 19 August, while motorized units performed a road march of 120 kilometers (75 mi). The 25 kilometer march from the railway station to the front was completed by 21 August, but the rifle divisions took longer to reach the front due to their lack of motor vehicles. The army was divided into three shock groups (Group Koptsov, Group Bogdanov, and Group Mostovenko) by its commander. Each shock group was built around a tank corps and included a rifle division and artillery units. Group Mostovenko included two rifle brigades instead of a motor rifle brigade. The first echelon, tasked with the breakthrough, included three rifle divisions and a rifle brigade. The second echelon consisted of nine tank and three motor rifle brigades, and in the third echelon were the 1st Guards Motor Rifle Division, the 179th Tank Brigade, the 8th Motorcycle Regiment, and the 54th Motorcycle Battalion. The orders for the offensive were issued on 18 August, giving three days of preparation to division and brigade commanders, although the late-arriving 154th and 264th Divisions of the 3rd Tank Army had only a day to prepare. On the night of 20–21 August, the 154th and 264th Rifle Divisions, tasked with the initial breakthrough in 3rd Tank Army's sector, moved into their jumping-off positions.

German intelligence detected the Soviet buildup, allowing them time to strengthen the forward defenses of the LIII Army Corps with large numbers of anti-tank weapons, minefields, and hastily dug trenches and dugouts. The German armor was withdrawn rearwards to create an operational reserve, and constructed rear defenses with multiple lines of dugouts and bunkers. The German defenses were based on the Zhizdra and Vytebet Rivers, the network of ravines, and settlements turned into fortified strongpoints.

== Battle ==
The attack began at 06:15 on 22 August, with Romanenko sending three rifle divisions and a rifle brigade in the first echelon against the 26th and 56th Infantry Divisions. The Soviet infantry units were able to advance 4–6 kilometers (2.5–3.7 mi) through the outer German defenses, but did not break through, although they were able to capture the village of Goskovo and advance to Myzin in the morning before being halted by German tanks moved up from the second line. At 07:20, Zhukov committed the 12th Tank Corps, led by the 30th and 106th Tank Brigades. After outrunning their supporting infantry, the corps was stopped by strong German defenses, minefields, and air strikes by Junkers Ju 87 Stukas and other bombers in the Goskovo area after an advance of 4 kilometers (2.5 mi) by noon. The 15th Corps' T-34-equipped 113th Tank Brigade was thrown in behind the 154th Rifle Division and soon advanced beyond the infantry, but suffered heavy losses to German airstrikes after being stopped in a minefield. The 15th's 17th Motor Rifle Brigade was then committed, but this also failed to renew the offensive.

At noon, the Western Front headquarters received a report that the 3rd Tank Corps had captured Smetskiye Vyselki, and that the German troops were hastily retreating from the first defensive line. Since Group Koptsov had failed to achieve a breakthrough, Zhukov personally ordered the 15th Corps north into Mostovenko's sector, tasked with advancing on Slobodka and Belyy Verkh. The 1st Guards Motor Rifle Division was ordered to advance between the 3rd and 15th Tank Corps towards Smetskaya, Zhukovo, and Perestryazh, and the 12th Tank Corps' attack was shifted north towards Myzin and Durnevo.

As a result, the original battle plan was abandoned and the tank brigades advanced into new sectors without route reconnaissance or infantry support. This caused the tanks to get stuck in minefields and swampy forested terrain. Additionally, the message on the capture of Smetskiye Vyselki turned out to have been false when the 15th Corps' screening detachment was ambushed and completely destroyed upon approaching the village, and vanguard led by Koptsov was involved in heavy fighting. The corps' 105th Heavy Tank Brigade and 17th Motor Rifle Brigade launched an attack on the village, taking it at 17:00 and dislodging the 56th Division's 192nd Infantry Regiment after losing seven tanks, but were unable to continue the advance. Meanwhile, the 154th and 264th Rifle Divisions, supported by the 12th Tank Corps, captured the villages of Ozernenskoye, Ozerno and Goskovo, but the southern group of the 61st Army made no progress. On the first day, the three shock groups advanced less than 5 kilometers (3.1 mi). Meanwhile, Group Mostovenko bypassed German resistance, reaching the Vytebet by 24 August, and captured the village of Belyy Kamen on 26 August, but could advance no further.

On 23 August, the units continued the advance on the previous axis of attack. The 12th Tank Corps, supported by the 154th Division, advanced southwest on Myzin, Babinkovo, Durnevo, and Staritsa. The forward detachment of its right flank 97th Tank Brigade, composed of 15 tanks and a motor rifle company, was cut off by German forces and wasn't taken out of the encirclement by the 106th Brigade until the end of the day. Romanenko committed his reserve, the 1st Guards Motor Rifle Division, to assist the 15th Tank Corps' attack on 23 August in the center of the army's assault. However, by this time, Clößner had shifted the 11th and 20th Panzer Divisions to stiffen the German infantry. That night, another attack failed due to poor coordination and the lack of a detailed plan. At dawn on 24 August, after suffering heavy losses in exchange for an advance of 1–2 kilometers (0.62–1.24 mi), the 3rd Tank Army was again stopped by German tanks and aircraft. By the end of 24 August, only 10 serviceable tanks were left in the 12th Corps' 30th Tank Brigade.

At this point, fuel shortages resulting from Soviet inexperience at supplying large tank formations began to affect the operations of the Soviet armored forces. The 1st Guards were able to advance another 4 kilometers (2.5 mi) and capture Smetskaya, further reducing the size of the German penetration, but were also halted on 25 August. By the end of the same day, Group Mostovenko and the 15th Corps cleared German resistance from positions east of the Vytebet and reached the river, but were unable to cross. The 12th Tank Corps, the 154th and 264th Divisions, and the southern group of the 61st Army unsuccessfully attacked to the west and southwest during this period, in some areas advancing 1–1.5 kilometers (0.62–0.93 mi).

To put steam back into the offensive, Romanenko made the decision to regroup his forces. On the night of 26 August, the 15th Corps was transferred from the center to the left flank of the offensive with orders to advance south to Sorokino alongside the 12th Corps and 154th Division. After completing a march of 15 kilometers (9.3 mi), the 15th went on the offensive, but was again unsuccessful. After the 15th had been repulsed, the 11th and 20th Panzer Divisions launched a counterattack, forcing Romanenko to withdraw the 15th Tank Corps to the Novogryn area to create an operational reserve.By the morning of 27 August, the German counterattack was thrown back, and the 15th was transferred to the left flank in the Pakom area to support the attack of the southern group of the 61st Army. The corps was supposed to break through the line and into the German rear, simultaneously pressed by Group Bogdanov and the 264th Division. The corps attacked in conjunction with the 12th Guards Rifle Division towards Leonovo on 28 August, but was stopped by an anti-tank ditch, which was bridged by sappers that night. However, the corps ran into a second ditch which could not be overrun. At this point, the southern group of the 61st Army, frontally assaulting German strongpoints, had advanced 3–4 kilometers (1.9–2.5 mi) on its right and 1 kilometer (0.62 mi) on its left.

On the next night, the 15th was pulled out of the line and by the morning of 30 August concentrated in the forests south of Meshalkino. An attack with Group Bogdanov towards Sorokino was planned, but was instead cancelled due to the 12th Tank Corps' heavy losses. During the day, the corps' 195th Tank Brigade helped two battalions of the 61st Army's 156th Rifle Division escape encirclement. Meanwhile, Group Mostovenko managed to cross the Vytebet, and Romanenko shifted the attack yet again to the center and right flank. The 15th Corps and 264th Rifle were transferred there, while the 12th Corps was withdrawn to the operational reserve to repel possible German counterattacks. Only 181 tanks remained in the army by this time, which meant that the losses of the previous nine days amounted to around 60% of the corps' armor, although some of the damaged tanks were later repaired.

On 1 September, in a meeting between Hitler and von Kluge, it was decided that Operation Wirbelwind would be abandoned and the 9th and 11th Panzer Divisions pulled out of the sector for a new attack due to the Soviet resistance. After regrouping his army, Romanenko launched another unsuccessful attack on the afternoon of 2 September. Despite massive German air attacks, Group Mostovenko took Volosovo, and after crossing the Vytebet, the 1st Guards Motor Rifle Division seized Zhukovo and Volosovo. The heaviest fighting took place in the center, near the village of Ozhigovo, which was attacked by the 264th. It took until the morning of 3 September to drive German troops out of the village, after a night attack by the 17th Motor Rifle Brigade and the 113th and 195th Tank Brigades. The 15th was to exploit the breakthrough, however, the 195th, advancing to Perestryazh, was counterattacked and halted by German tanks, of which 13 were claimed destroyed by Soviet forces. Despite this, the offensive had to be halted, and Group Mostovenko failed to advance during the day.

On the evening of 3 September, the 3rd Tank Corps was withdrawn to the RVGK as a result of its heavy losses. From 5 to 9 September, the tank brigades remaining in the bridgehead over the Vytebet, supported by infantry, attempted to resume the offensive, but failed due to counterattacks by the 9th and 17th Panzer Divisions. On 10 September, the 3rd Tank Army shifted to defense, and in the second half of the month, having transferred the 1st Guards Motor Rifle Division, the 15th Corps' 17th Motor Rifle Brigade, and artillery units to the 16th and 61st Armies, it was withdrawn to the RVGK.

The attack launched by the 16th Army was similarly unsuccessful. On the first day of the offensive, the 16th Army's shock group was halted by a combination of unfavorable terrain and being too weak to break through the German line after advancing a few hundred meters. The main forces of the 16th Army's left flank advanced south instead of east towards the 3rd Tank Army, slowly forcing the German troops back to a previous defensive position. By 29 August, the army's left flank had reached the line of Gretnya, Vosty, and Volosovo, having advanced between 1–5 kilometers (0.62–3.11 mi) in eight days. A rifle division from the army reserve was sent into the fight in the Gretnya area, but was also unsuccessful.

== Aftermath ==
After the Soviet offensive was halted, most of the remaining tank units were transferred to other fronts after both sides shifted to the defensive. Although it had prevented the German attack from continuing in the sector, the Soviet attack had gained very little, relative to the number of troops committed. Soviet tank losses in the operation numbered up to 500 tanks, out of the original 700. For the period between 22 and 29 August, the Soviet troops suffered casualties of 12,134 killed and 22,415 wounded for a total of 34,549 out of an initial strength of 218,412 men. The fighting did, however, divert scarce German Panzer divisions and air units from the main attack in the south.
