= Vasily Lomakin =

Red army colonel

Vasily Andreyevich Lomakin
- Lomakin in 1943
- Native name: Василий Андреевич Ломакин
- Born: 28 December 1899; Tsarevo village, Astrakhan Governorate, Russian Empire
- Died: 22 July 1943 (aged 43) Semyonovka village, Zalegoshchensky District, Oryol Oblast, Soviet Union
- Allegiance: Soviet Union
- Branch: Red Army
- Service years: 1918–1943
- Rank: Colonel
- Commands: 195th Tank Brigade
- Conflicts: Russian Civil War; World War II; Battle of Kursk; Operation Kutuzov †
- Awards: Hero of the Soviet Union

Vasily Andreyevich Lomakin (Russian: Василий Андреевич Ломакин; 28 December 1899–22 July 1943) was a Red Army colonel and posthumous Hero of the Soviet Union. Lomakin led the 195th Tank Brigade at the Battle of Kursk and in Operation Kutuzov. He was killed in action during Operation Kutuzov.

== Early life, Russian Civil War and interwar period ==
Lomakin was born on 28 December 1899 in Tsarevo village, Astrakhan Governorate to a peasant family. He graduated from the School of Mines and worked as a press operator. Lomakin joined the Red Army in August 1918 during the Russian Civil War. He served as a clerk in the 1st Separate Tsarevo Soviet Battalion and graduated from the Tsaritsyn Infantry Courses in 1919 and the 34th Saratov Machine Gun Command Courses in 1920 before being sent to the Western Front in August of the latter year to fight in the Polish–Soviet War. In the latter, Lomakin became a machine gun platoon commander and assistant chief of the machine gun detachment of the 32nd Rifle Regiment. In 1920, he joined the Communist Party of the Soviet Union.

From August 1921, Lomakin commanded the separate machine gun platoon of the junior commanders training school of the 4th Rifle Division. He served in the Moscow Military District from September 1922 as a platoon commander of the Combined Military School, commander of a machine gun and rifle-machine gun platoon in the machine gun detachment of the 215th Separate Machine Gun Battalion of the Forces of Special Purpose, assistant chief of the machine gun detachment, chief of the supply detachment, and as commander and political officer of a machine gun company, and assistant commander of a battalion of the 16th Rifle Regiment. During this period he graduated from the Improvement Courses for mid-level command personnel at the Moscow Infantry School in 1927 and the Frunze Military Academy in 1933.

Appointed chief of staff of the 7th Mechanized Regiment of the Belorussian Military District in 1933, Lomakin transferred to the Kiev Military District in April 1936 to serve successively as assistant chief and chief of the 1st section (later department) of the staff of the 45th Mechanized Corps, assistant to the army inspector of the district staff, chief of staff of the 22nd Mechanized Brigade, and chief of the 1st department of the Vehicle, Armour, and Tank Administration (ABTU) of the district. Promoted to colonel on 5 March 1940, Lomakin became an instructor at the general tactics department of the Frunze Military Academy in May 1940, and was appointed tactics instructor with the operational and tactical training department of the Higher Special School of the General Staff in October.

== World War II ==
After the beginning of Operation Barbarossa, Lomakin remained at the school and in March 1942 became senior instructor of the department. He was appointed head of the first year of the Higher Intelligence Officer Improvement Course on 30 January 1943. After repeatedly requesting for a combat post, Lomakin was appointed commander of the 195th Tank Brigade of the 15th Tank Corps, part of the 3rd Guards Tank Army, on 15 June 1943.

The 3rd Guards Tank Army was sent into battle at Kursk to reinforce the Bryansk Front. On 17 July, the army began to advance and was 10 kilometers from Oleshnya. The army was ordered to break through German defences and develop the offensive in the southwest. After the artillery barrage and air strikes, the army attacked. The tanks crossed the Oleshnya River, but the 113th Tank Brigade encountered stubborn resistance. The 195th Tank Brigade was then sent into combat. Finding a gap in the German defences, the brigade moved forward across the Oleshnya. From 19 to 22 July, Lomakin personally led the brigade. In this period, the brigade reportedly destroyed 20 tanks, 25 guns, 7 self-propelled guns, 60 trucks and 3 warehouses. The brigade also reportedly wiped out two German battalions.

On 22 July, the brigade encountered entrenched German troops in the village of Semyonovka in Zalegoshchensky District. Lomakin concluded that the village could only be taken with a flank attack. The 1st and 2nd Tank Battalions of the brigade were ordered to attack. The two battalions cut off the village. Lomakin ordered the 3rd Tank Battalion to conduct a frontal attack. In his command tank, Lomakin participated in the attack. The German troops laid down a heavy artillery barrage, one of the shells hitting Lomakin's tank. The entire crew was wounded and Lomakin decided not to leave the tank. The second German shell hit the tank and it caught fire, killing the crew along with Lomakin. Lomakin was buried in the village.

On 4 June 1944, Lomakin was posthumously awarded the title Hero of the Soviet Union and the Order of Lenin.
