= Georgy Vysotsky =

Ukrainian scientist

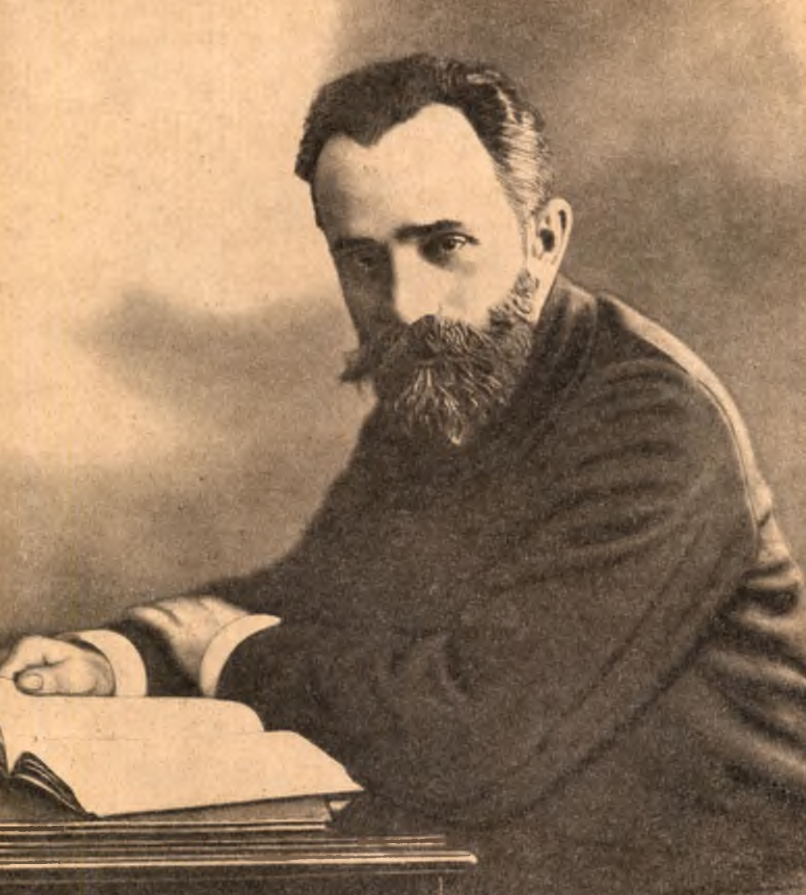
c. 1912

Georgy Nikolaevich (or Mykolayovych) Vysotsky (Russian: Гео́ргий Никола́евич Высо́цкий; Ukrainian: Георгій Миколайович Висоцький, romanized: Heorhii Mykolaiovych Vysotskyi; 7 February 1865 – 6 April 1940) was a Ukrainian and Soviet soil scientist and forester who worked in the steppe, where he examined forest growth and the effects of soil factors.

Vysotsky was born in Nikitovka and went to the St. Petersburg Petrovsky Agricultural Academy in 1886, where he came under the influence of Vasily Dokuchaev and Georgy Fedorovich Morozov. He worked from 1890 at the Berdyansk Reserve and in 1892 joined Dokuchaev on an expedition to Poltava and became manager of the Great Anatolian forest reserve. There, he experimented on the use of forest strips to manage droughts. From 1904, he worked on experimental forestry near Samara. From 1913, he worked on reforestation of the steppe near Kiev and from 1918, he began to teach first in Kiev and then in Simferopol, Minsk and Kharkiv.

He conducted his research on forest growth and regrowth, studying soil hydrology, soil salinity and other factors. A major contribution was his approach to measuring the moisture balance of forests, which has been modified and goes by the name of Vysotsky-Ivanov moisture coefficient defined as the ratio of the annual precipitation to the annual evaporation. Based on that index, he suggested a land classification. In 1915 he received the Semenov-Tian-Shanskyi gold medal from the Russian geographical society.
