= 264th Division =

264th Division may refer to:

- 264th Infantry Division, Wehrmacht, Germany
- 264th Rifle Division, Soviet Union

== See also ==
- List of military divisions by number
