= 41st Rifle Division =

Infantry division of the Soviet Union's Red Army

- Active: c. 1932 – 1945 (First Formation) 1955–1957 (Second Formation)
- Country: Soviet Union
- Branch: Red Army
- Type: Infantry
- Size: Division

Commanders
- Notable commanders: Vladimir Boyarsky; Vasily G. Vorontsov

The 41st Rifle Division was an infantry division of the Soviet Union's Red Army during World War II.

The First Formation was initially established as the Krivorozhskaya Territorial Rifle Division (Криворожская территориальная стрелковая дивизия) in 1931, at Kryvyi Rih.

It was initially formed in the Kharkov Military District. With 6th Rifle Corps, 6th Army of the Southwestern Front from 22 June 1941. Wiped out at Kiev September 1941. Recreated at Chapayevsk March 1942, wiped out near Izyum during Second Battle of Kharkov May 1942. Recreated again in October 1942 at Verchovye from 118th Rifle Brigade, fought at Kursk, Belarus, and in Poland (see Lublin–Brest offensive). With 69th Army of the 1st Belorussian Front participated in Battle of Berlin, 16 April - May 1945. The division was disbanded "in place" with the Group of Soviet Forces in Germany during the summer of 1945.

On 4 March 1955, a number of Soviet units were redesignated. The 264th Ussuriysk Rifle Division in the Far East became the 41st Rifle Red Banner Division. While at Dolinsk as part of the 15th Army of the Far East Military District, the 41st Rifle Division became the 41st Motor Rifle Division on 17 April 1957. The division was disbanded on 1 April 1958.
