= 11th Tank Division (Soviet Union) =

Tank division of the Soviet military

11th Tank Division (1940–1941) 11th Tank Corps (1942–1945) 11th Tank Division (1945–1947)
- Active: 1940–1941; 1942–1947
- Country: Soviet Union
- Allegiance: Red Army
- Branch: Soviet Ground Forces
- Type: Tank
- Role: Armored warfare
- Size: Division, Tank Corps
- Engagements: World War II; Cold War
- Decorations: Order of Suvorov Order of Kutuzov
- Battle honours: Radom; Berlin

The 11th Tank Division was a Soviet tank division initially formed in 1940 at Tiraspol and destroyed in 1941; it was then formed as a tank corps in May 1942. This unit was subsequently reorganized as the second formation of the 11th Tank Division in 1945.

== History ==
=== First Formation ===
The first (1940) formation of the 11th Tank Division was subordinated to the 2nd Mechanized Corps, itself part of the 9th (independent) Army. The 11th Tank Division was destroyed near Novo-Arkhangelsk (Ukraine) in combat against the Germans in August 1941, with remnants escaping encirclement and being reorganized as the 132nd Tank Brigade, which later became the 4th Guards Tank Brigade.

=== 11th Tank Corps ===
Initiating a separate unit lineage, the 11th Tank Corps was formed on May 19, 1942. By June 1942, the 11th Tank Corps was subordinated to the Bryansk Front. Subordinate units at that time included the 53rd and 160th Tank Brigades, and the 12th Motor Rifle Brigade. The corps was never permanently attached to a tank army and was subordinated to several fronts during the course of the war.

11th Tank Corps was in combat near Kharkov in 1942, Orel in 1943, the offensive to drive the Germans from Belorussia in 1944, and the offensive across central Poland in January 1945.

As the Soviet Army approached victory in April 1945 during the Battle of Berlin, the 11th Tank Corps was part of the 1st Belorussian Front. It commanded the 20th, 36th, and 65th Tank Brigades, as well as the 12th Motor Rifle Brigade. During the battle, the corps was used to flank the Seelow Heights from the north, and in the advance into the city from the east.

=== Second Formation ===
The 11th Tank Corps, like all Soviet tank corps, was reorganized as a division on 10 June 1945, and was renamed the 11th Tank Division. The 11th Tank Division was part of the Group of Soviet Forces in Germany, subordinated to 1st Guards Tank Army from August of that year. It was soon transferred to the 3rd Shock Army. The division was relocated to Gusev, Kaliningrad Oblast in the Baltic Military District in early 1947. It was disbanded in February 1947, with its tank regiments becoming part of rifle divisions in the district and the 12th Motor Rifle Regiment, 243rd Mortar Regiment, 1388th Anti-Aircraft Artillery Regiment, 115th Guards Separate Mortar Battalion, 153rd Sapper Battalion, 687th Communications Battalion, 204th Medical-Sanitary Battalion, and 677th Motor Transport Battalion were all disbanded.

An 11th Guards Tank Corps also existed but was a different unit.

== Commanders ==
The following officers commanded the 11th Tank Corps during World War II:

- Major General Alexey Popov (19 May–21 July 1942)
- Major General Ivan Lazerev (22 July 1942–7 June 1943)
- Major General Nikolai Radkevich (8 June–21 October 1943)
- Major General Dmitry Gritsenko (22 October 1943–11 January 1944)
- Major General Filipp Rudkin (12 January–14 July 1944)
- Major General Ivan Yushchuk (15 July 1944–after 9 May 1945)
