= Prokofy Romanenko =

Ukrainian Soviet colonel general (1897–1949)

- Прокофий Логвинович Романенко
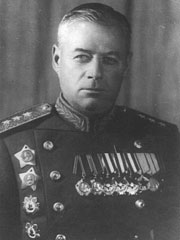
- Born: 25 February [O.S. 13 February] 1897; Romanenko khutor, Romensky Uyezd, Poltava Governorate, Russian Empire
- Died: 10 March 1949 (aged 52); Moscow, Soviet Union
- Burial place: Novodevichy Cemetery
- Military career
- Allegiance: Russian Empire; RSFSR; Soviet Union
- Branch: Imperial Russian Army; Red Army (later Soviet Army)
- Service years: 1914–1917; 1918–1949
- Rank: Colonel general
- Commands: 17th Army; 3rd Tank Army; 5th Tank Army; 2nd Tank Army; 48th Army; Eastern Siberian Military District
- Conflicts: World War I; Russian Civil War; Winter War; World War II
- Awards: Order of Lenin (2); Order of the Red Banner (4); Order of Suvorov 1st class (2); Order of Kutuzov 1st class (2); Cross of St. George 1st, 2nd, 3rd, and 4th classes

Prokofy Logvinovich Romanenko (Russian: Прокофий Логвинович Романенко; 25 February [O.S. 13 February] 1897 – 10 March 1949) was a Ukrainian Soviet Army colonel general.

Serving in the Imperial Russian Army during World War I, Romanenko joined the Red Army during the Russian Civil War, becoming a cavalry commander. He quickly moved up in rank during the interwar period, fighting in the Spanish Civil War as an adviser and in the Winter War as commander of the 10th Tank Corps. After commanding a rifle corps and the 1st Mechanized Corps, he led the 17th Army in the Soviet Far East from early 1941. He was sent west to command the 3rd Tank Army in May 1942, leading it during the failed Kozelsk Offensive in the summer. Afterwards, Romanenko was transferred to lead the 5th Tank Army in Operation Uranus, the Soviet counteroffensive in the Battle of Stalingrad. After the end of the battle, in February 1943, he became commander of the 2nd Tank Army, but after an unsuccessful attack became commander of the 48th Army in March. Romanenko led the 48th Army until December 1944, including in the Battle of Kursk and Operation Bagration. He was replaced in command as a result of declining health, and postwar commanded the East Siberian Military District before his 1949 death.

== Early life and World War I ==
Romanenko was born on 25 February 1897 at his peasant family's khutor in Poltava Governorate's Romensky Uyezd (now the village of Khustyanka in Buryn Raion). He fought in the Imperial Russian Army during World War I, volunteering for the 14th Orenburg Cossack Regiment in 1914 and becoming a sergeant (uryadnik in the Cossack rank system) and then senior sergeant. Romanenko fought on the Southwestern Front as commander of a half-company, and was awarded four Crosses of St. George for his actions. In 1917, he graduated from the 5th Kiev Praporshchik School, and was promoted to praporshchik, becoming a junior officer in the 155th Reserve Infantry Regiment.

== Russian Civil War ==
After the dissolution of the Imperial Army, in January 1918, Romanenko was elected a member of the Blagodatnentsky Volost executive committee in Stavropol Governorate, and in March became its military commissar. In June, he organized a partisan detachment, fighting against the Volunteer Army on the Southern Front of the Russian Civil War. In August, after joining the Red Army, the unit became the 4th Stavropol Regiment, and became part of the 2nd North Stavropol Division in September, being renamed the 12th Rifle Regiment. Romanenko transferred to become commander of a cavalry squadron in the 6th Cavalry Division's 33rd Cavalry Regiment in June 1919, later serving as the assistant regimental commander. In 1918 and 1919, Romanenko participated in the fight against White Cossacks and Anton Denikin's White troops in Stavropol Governorate, the Voronezh-Kastornensk Offensive, the Kharkov Operation, and the Donbass Offensive. Towards the end of the year the 6th Division was assigned to the 1st Cavalry Army. Taking command of the regiment in June 1920, he led it during the Polish–Soviet War in the Battle of Lwów on the Southwestern Front, and in the fall fought in the Perekop-Chongar Offensive, driving Pyotr Nikolayevich Wrangel's White troops out of Crimea.

== Interwar period ==
After the end of the Civil War, in May 1921, Romanenko became commander of the 14th Cavalry Division's 83rd Cavalry Regiment, part of the North Caucasus Military District. In 1925 he graduated from commander's refresher courses (KUKS) at the Leningrad Higher Cavalry School, becoming commander of the 10th Maikop Cavalry Division's 59th Cavalry Regiment in October 1926. Romanenko transferred to command the 10th Verkhneuralsk Red Cossack Cavalry Regiment of the 2nd Red Cossack Cavalry Division. In 1930, he graduated from Officer Improvement Courses (KUVNAS) at the Frunze Military Academy, and graduated from the academy itself in May 1933. He then became an assistant chief of the 3rd Department in the Directorate for Motorization and Mechanization, and in May 1935 became the 13th Mechanized Brigade's chief of staff in the Moscow Military District. In April 1937, Romanenko took command of the Leningrad Military District's 11th Mechanized Brigade. He was sent to Spain as an adviser to the Spanish Republican Army during the Spanish Civil War, and was awarded the Order of Lenin for his actions there. Upon his return to the Soviet Union in February 1938, Romanenko took command of the 7th Mechanized Corps in the Leningrad Military District, which was later converted into the 10th Tank Corps, leading it during the Winter War in the fighting around Kiviniemi and the repulse of a Finnish counterattack northeast of Boboshino. In May 1940 he took command of the 34th Rifle Corps in the North Caucasus Military District, but was appointed commander of the new 1st Mechanized Corps in June. Romanenko became commander of the 17th Army of the Transbaikal Military District in January 1941.

== World War II ==
After spending the first months following Operation Barbarossa, the German invasion of the Soviet Union, in the Far East, Romanenko was sent west to command the newly formed 3rd Tank Army in May 1942. In late August, the army became part of the Western Front and fought in the unsuccessful Kozelsk Offensive against the 2nd Panzer Army. After the offensive ended in September, he became deputy commander of the Bryansk Front. Romanenko was transferred to command the reformed 5th Tank Army in November, leading it in Operation Uranus, the Soviet counteroffensive in the Battle of Stalingrad during late November. In January 1943, he took command of the 2nd Tank Army, fighting in Central Front's unsuccessful offensive on Oryol and Bryansk during February. Romanenko then became commander of the 48th Army in the same month, leading it during the Battle of Kursk, Operation Kutuzov, and the Chernigov-Pripyat Offensive in the summer and early fall of 1943. From November 1943, the army fought in the Gomel-Rechitsa Offensive, during which it captured Gomel. During Operation Bagration, the Soviet offensive that recaptured Belarus and eastern Poland, which began in late June 1944, the army fought in the Bobruysk Offensive, seizing Zhlobin, Bobruisk, and Slonim. In July, Romanenko was promoted to Colonel General, but was replaced in command in December 1944 due to declining health.

== Postwar ==
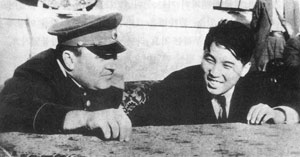
General Romanenko with future leader of North Korea Kim Il Sung, Pyongyang, December 1945

From July 1945, Romanenko commanded the East Siberian Military District. In February 1947 he became a student at the Higher Academic Courses of the Higher Military Academy, but in December transferred to the 2nd Main Courses of the academy, graduating in 1948. Romanenko was a deputy of the Second Convocation of the Supreme Soviet before his death on 10 March 1949 as a result of a serious illness. He was buried in Novodevichy Cemetery.
