= Samarino =

Samarino Самарино
- Selo
- Location within Bashkortostan Location within Russia
- Coordinates: 54°37′N 54°57′E
- Country: Russia
- Region: Bashkortostan
- District: Blagovarsky District
- Time zone: UTC+5:00

Samarino (Russian: Самарино) is a rural locality (a selo) in Blagovarsky Selsoviet, Blagovarsky District, Bashkortostan, Russia. The population was 285 as of 2010. There are 2 streets.

== Geography ==
Samarino is located 9 km southwest of Yazykovo (the district's administrative centre) by road. Kirillo-Karmasan is the nearest rural locality.
