= 25th Tank Corps =

Tank corps of the Soviet military

- Allegiance: Soviet Union
- Branch: Soviet Red Army
- Engagements: Soviet invasion of Poland

The 25th Tank Corps was a corps of the Soviet Red Army. It was part of the 12th Army. It took part in the Soviet invasion of Poland in 1939.

== Organization ==
- 4th Light Tank Brigade
- 5th Tank Brigade
- 1st Motor Rifle Brigade
