= Dvorets =

Dvorets Дворец
- Village
- Location within Vologda Oblast Location within Russia
- Coordinates: 58°50′N 40°15′E
- Country: Russia
- Region: Vologda Oblast
- District: Gryazovetsky District
- Time zone: UTC+3:00

Dvorets (Russian: Дворец) is a rural locality (a village) in Rostilovskoye Rural Settlement, Gryazovetsky District, Vologda Oblast, Russia. The population was 15 as of 2002.

== Geography ==
Dvorets is located 5 km (3.1 mi) south of Gryazovets (the district's administrative centre) by road. Krestovka is the nearest rural locality.
