= Vasily Koptsov =

Georgian military personnel

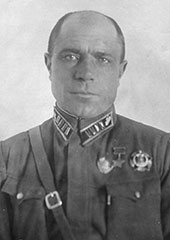
- Koptsov, c. 1940
- Native name: Василий Алексеевич Копцов
- Born: 1 January 1904; Tiflis, Tiflis Governorate, Russian Empire
- Died: 2 March 1943 (aged 39) Kharkov Oblast, Soviet Union
- Allegiance: Soviet Union
- Branch: Red Army
- Service years: 1918–43
- Rank: Major general
- Commands: 46th Tank Division; 15th Tank Corps
- Conflicts: Russian Civil War; Sino-Soviet conflict; Battles of Khalkhin Gol; World War II (DOW)
- Awards: Hero of the Soviet Union; Order of Lenin; Order of the Red Banner (2); Order of Suvorov, 2nd class; Order of the Red Banner (Mongolian People's Republic)

Vasily Alexeyevich Koptsov (Russian: Василий Алексеевич Копцов; 1 January 1904 – 2 March 1943) was a Soviet major general of the Red Army and a Hero of the Soviet Union.

Koptsov joined the Red Army during the Russian Civil War and by the late 1930s rose to command a tank battalion. His unit fought in the Battles of Khalkhin Gol, for which he was awarded the title Hero of the Soviet Union for his actions where he defended his immobilized tank for eight hours until Soviet forces could relieve him. In March 1941, Koptsov became deputy commander of the 46th Tank Division of the 21st Mechanized Corps, taking command on the day after the German invasion of the Soviet Union, and leading the first in failed counterattacks against the German advance. In September 1941, Koptsov was transferred to the Karelian Front where he defended against Finnish attacks, and then to the Volkhov Front where he fought in the Tikhvin Defensive Operation and Tikhvin Offensive, for which Koptsov's brigade became a Guards unit. In May 1942, Koptsov became commander of the newly formed 15th Tank Corps, which he led during the summer in unsuccessful Kozelsk Offensive. In January 1943, he fought in the Ostrogozhsk–Rossosh Offensive, completing the encirclement of Hungarian troops. Koptsov's corps then fought in the Third Battle of Kharkov, in which it was surrounded and nearly destroyed by the German counterattack.

Koptsov died on 2 March 1943, during the Third Battle of Kharkov when his corps was surrounded and nearly destroyed by the German counterattack, and was briefly captured by German troops before he died of his wounds in captivity.

== Early life and Russian Civil War ==
Vasily Alexeyevich Koptsov was born on 1 January 1904, in Tiflis, Russian Empire (now Tbilisi, Georgia) to a working-class family. He graduated from primary school and worked in a sawmill. In March 1918, Koptsov joined the Red Army and fought in the Russian Civil War, serving with the 450th North Kuban Regiment of the 3rd Taman Brigade of the Taman Army, with which he fought in the escape from encirclement of the Taman Army, fictionalized in Alexander Serafimovich's The Iron Flood. Koptsov later fought on the Southern Front.

== Interwar period ==
In October 1922, Koptsov entered the 46th Machine Gun Course at Stavropol and Vladikavkaz. He later transferred to the United Higher Military School named for the Central Executive Committee in Moscow. In 1925, Koptsov became a Communist Party of the Soviet Union member. He graduated from the school in 1926. In August of that year, Koptsov took command of a platoon of the 49th Rifle Regiment, part of the 17th Rifle Division at Nizhny Novgorod. Between March 1927 and September 1928, he served as an instructor platoon commander for preinduction training at the Bronnitsy Military Enlistment Office. Koptsov then entered a year-long military and political training course in Moscow, from which he graduated in September 1929, after which he became a company political officer in the 3rd Verkhneudinsk Rifle Regiment of the 1st Pacific Rifle Division in the Special Red Banner Far Eastern Army. Koptsov fought in the 1929 Sino-Soviet conflict during his service with the division. In 1931 Koptsov graduated from the Leningrad Armored Refresher Courses for Red Army Commanders. He became a company and then battalion commander in the 1st Tank Regiment of the Belorussian Military District.

Koptsov became a battalion commander in the 11th Mechanized Corps school for junior command personnel, part of the Transbaikal Military District. Future General Secretary of the Communist Party of the Soviet Union Leonid Brezhnev was one of the students in the training battalion. In August 1937 he became commander of the 1st Tank Battalion of the 6th Mechanized Brigade, which became the 6th Light Tank Brigade. Koptsov's brigade fought in the Battles of Khalkhin Gol in 1939. On 22 August, he personally led his battalion in a night attack, and after defeating Japanese troops moved into the Khaylestin-Gol river valley, cutting off Japanese escape routes. He positioned two companies for an ambush and in this action killed more retreating Japanese. On 25 August, Koptsov received orders to destroy an advancing Japanese regiment. During this action, his tank was badly damaged. Koptsov defended his immobilized tank behind Japanese lines for eight hours until relieved by Soviet troops. On 17 November, he was awarded the title Hero of the Soviet Union and the Order of Lenin. He was also awarded the Mongolian People's Republic's Order of the Red Banner during the year. In June 1940, Koptsov became a battalion commander in the 8th Red Banner Light Tank Brigade, and in November became the brigade commander. In March 1941, he was appointed deputy commander of the 21st Mechanized Corps' 46th Tank Division in the Moscow Military District.

== World War II ==
Koptsov took command of the 46th Tank Division on the day after the German invasion of the Soviet Union began on 22 June. The division and its corps were transferred to the Northwestern Front and unsuccessfully counterattacked at Daugavpils on 25 June. The division fought in the retreat to the Pskov area. During the Baltic Operation Koptsov was wounded, but remained in command. On 31 August, Koptsov was awarded the Order of the Red Banner. In September, the division was converted into the 6th Tank Brigade and transferred to the 7th Separate Army, fighting in battles against Finnish troops on the Karelian Isthmus. On 11 September Koptsov was promoted to the rank of major general. Between November and December, the brigade fought in the Tikhvin Defensive and Offensive operations. During the Tikhvin Offensive Operation, the brigade was reported by Soviet sources to have killed 1,500 German soldiers and destroyed eight tanks, six armored vehicles, eleven guns, and large amounts of other military equipment. Koptsov was wounded again in the fighting and received a second Order of the Red Banner on 27 December. On 16 February 1942 the brigade was converted into the 7th Guards Tank Brigade for its actions.

On 21 May Koptsov became commander of the 15th Tank Corps, part of the 3rd Tank Army. Aged 38, he was one of the youngest tank corps commanders at the time. In August 1942, the corps fought in the counterattack against German troops at Kozelsk. In 1943, Koptsov was awarded the Order of Suvorov, 2nd class. From January 1943 the corps fought on the Voronezh Front, fighting in the Ostrogozhsk–Rossosh Offensive. On the first day, 14 January, the corps attacked the XXIV Panzer Corps, overrunning its command post and killing its commander during a 20-kilometer advance. Operating in conjunction with the 12th Tank Corps, the 15th broke through German defenses and on 17 January closed the encirclement ring, linking up with troops from the 40th Army at Alexeyevka. This cut off the retreat for the Italian Alpini Corps and thousands of Hungarian and German troops. After the end of the offensive, the corps continued its advance against stiffening German resistance, suffering increasingly heavy losses. On 16 February it recaptured Kharkov. The corps fought in the Third Battle of Kharkov. On 23 February a German counterattack encircled a large Soviet force south of Kharkov. As a result, the 3rd Tank Army was ordered to relieve the trapped force, and the 15th Tank Corps was itself surrounded, defending a pocket around Kegichevka. Koptsov ordered his remaining troops to break out, and he was seriously wounded on 28 February.

== Death ==
On 2 March 1943, Koptsov and his adjutant were captured by German troops while they were sleeping. A few hours later, Koptsov died of his wounds and was buried by the German troops south of the Krasnyi State Farm.
