= Filipp Rudkin =

Belarusian soviet army (1893–1954)

- Native name: Филипп Никитович Рудкин
- Born: 27 November 1893; Chornaya Sosna, Mogilev Governorate, Russian Empire
- Died: 12 October 1954 (aged 60) Moscow, Soviet Union
- Allegiance: Russian Empire; Soviet Union
- Branch: Russian Imperial Army; Cheka; OGPU; NKVD; Red Army (later Soviet Army)
- Service years: 1915–1917; 1918–1938; 1940–1952
- Rank: Major general
- Commands: 15th Tank Corps (became 7th Guards Tank Corps); 11th Tank Corps
- Conflicts: World War I; Russian Civil War; World War II
- Awards: Hero of the Soviet Union; Order of Lenin (3); Order of the Red Banner (2); Order of Kutuzov, 2nd class

Filipp Nikitovich Rudkin (Russian: Фили́пп Ники́тович Ру́дкин; 27 November 1893 – 12 October 1954) was a Belarusian Soviet Army major general and a Hero of the Soviet Union.

After fighting in World War I, he successively became a Cheka, OGPU, and NKVD officer, seeing action in the Russian Civil War. Rudkin was transferred to the reserve in 1938 but reinstated two years later. After the Operation Barbarossa, the German invasion of the Soviet Union, began on 22 June 1941, he became an armor officer in the Red Army. Given command of a separate tank brigade, Rudkin led it in the Ostrogozhsk–Rossosh Offensive, Operation Star, and the Third Battle of Kharkov in early 1943. For his leadership he received the title Hero of the Soviet Union in March, and became commander of the 15th Tank Corps in June. After leading the unit in Operation Kutuzov, he was considered unsuited for corps command and relieved, being demoted to command a rear area tank training unit. Rudkin was sent back to the front in January 1944, and led the 11th Tank Corps until July, when his corps suffered heavy losses after advancing into a German counterattack, after which he became deputy commander of the 3rd Belorussian Front's armored and mechanized troops, a position he ended the war in. Postwar, he served in several armored and mechanized forces posts in the Soviet Army, retiring in 1952.

== Early life and military career ==
A Belorussian, Rudkin was born on 27 November 1893 in the village of Chyornaya Sosna, Belitsky volost, Cherikovsky Uyezd, Mogilev Governorate (now in Mstsislaw District, Mogilev Region) to a peasant family. He joined the Russian Social Democratic Labor Party in 1914. After the beginning of World War I, Rudkin was conscripted into the Russian Imperial Army in October 1915, serving in the 16th Siberian Reserve Battalion. In December of that year he was arrested and imprisoned. He was sent to the Western Front in February 1917, serving as a private in the 138th Infantry Division's 551st Veliky Ustyug Regiment on the Dvinsk line. Rudkin actively participated in the Russian Revolution, and in November 1917 he was elected commander and commissar of his division as the Imperial Army dissolved.

He joined the Red Army in May 1918 and fought in the Russian Civil War as a Cheka officer, initially as a commissar of a Cheka detachment. In December, Rudkin transferred to the Northern Front to become commissar of a Cheka brigade there. From June 1919, he was assistant to the Extraordinary Military Commissar of the Western Front, fighting in battles against Nikolai Yudenich's White Army. He became inspector of the Cheka troops in Moscow in November 1919, and was twice wounded in the war.

== Interwar period ==
After its establishment in 1919, Rudkin graduated from the worker's school at the Moscow Mining Academy. For many years after the end of the Civil War, he successively served as inspector of the Cheka, OGPU, and NKVD troops in Moscow. From November 1926, he served as chief of the NKVD special department in Moscow, military inspector of the OGPU troops in Leningrad Oblast, and a senior inspector of the transport department of the OGPU. In 1937, he graduated from the Red Army Military Academy of Mechanization and Motorization. Rudkin transferred to become a department head of the NKVD troops in Ukraine and Crimea in November, but was transferred to the reserve in October 1938. He was reinstated in January 1940 and became head of the auto-tractor transport department of the NKVD.

== World War II ==
In September 1941, Rudkin was appointed a department head in the automobile and tank directorate of the Karelian Front, fighting in World War II. In June 1942, he transferred to become deputy head of the Stalingrad Light Armored Training Center, and fought in the Battle of Stalingrad. Rudkin took command of the 215th Tank Brigade in the Moscow Military District in August, but became commander of the 179th Tank Brigade in November, fighting on the Southern Front and the Southwestern Front. Between 14 January and 14 March 1943, the brigade fought in the Ostrogozhsk–Rossosh Offensive, Operation Star, and the Third Battle of Kharkov as part of the 3rd Tank Army. During the fighting, the brigade captured dozens of settlements and large amounts of military equipment. During the fighting for Kharkov, the 179th reportedly destroyed around 50 tanks and other military equipment, and killed large numbers of German soldiers. After it was encircled during the Third Battle of Kharkov, Rudkin led his brigade out of the pocket near Staryi Saltiv. On 31 March, he received the title Hero of the Soviet Union and the Order of Lenin for his leadership, and was promoted to major general on 7 June.

Rudkin took command of the 15th Tank Corps on 11 June, leading it during the Operation Kutuzov in July and August. On 26 July, the corps was converted into the 7th Guards Tank Corps for its actions. Rudkin was relieved of command on 6 August because he was considered unfit for corps command, and became the commander of the Tambov Tank Camp. On 12 January 1944 he was sent back to the front as commander of the 11th Tank Corps. During his time in command, the corps participated in the Proskurov-Chernivtsi Offensive and Operation Bagration as part of the 13th Army and the 47th Army. During Operation Bagration, on 7 July, the 47th Army and the tank corps attacked in the Kovel area, with the corps ordered to exploit the breakthrough by taking to Liuboml and Opalin, crossing the Western Bug, and advancing on Lublin. Although the 47th Army's attack made little progress, the corps was still sent into combat, due to the Soviet assumption that the German troops were still retreating, along with a lack of reconnaissance. The 11th Tank Corps suffered heavy losses in a German counterattack, and Rudkin was relieved of command on 14 July. In a Stavka order dated 16 July, he was blamed for the corps' loss of 75 tanks, and its attack without infantry or artillery support. In August, he became deputy commander of the armored and mechanized forces of the 3rd Belorussian Front, fighting in the Gumbinnen Operation and the East Prussian Offensive.

== Postwar ==
In June 1945, Rudkin became deputy commander of the armored and mechanized forces of the Baranovichi Military District. From December, he was at the disposal of the chief of the Ground Forces. Rudkin served as a senior inspector of the armored and mechanized forces of the Inspectorate of the Ground Forces between June 1946 and March 1947. In August, he became commander of the armored and mechanized forces of the 3rd Shock Army. In June 1950, Rudkin transferred to the South Ural Military District to command its armored and mechanized forces. After retiring in November 1952, he lived and worked in Moscow. Rudkin died on 12 October 1954 and was buried in the Vvedenskoye Cemetery.

== Awards and honors ==
Hero of the Soviet Union (31 March 1943)
Order of Lenin, thrice (4 February 1943, 31 March 1943, 21 February 1945)
Order of the Red Banner, twice (3 November 1944, 24 June 1948)
Order of Kutuzov, 2nd class (19 April 1945)
Medal "For the Defence of Sevastopol" (1942)
Medal "For the Defence of Stalingrad" (1942)
Medal "For the Capture of Königsberg" (1945)
Medal "For the Victory over Germany in the Great Patriotic War 1941–1945" (1945)
