= Tsarev, Russia =

Tsarev Царев
- Selo
- Location within Volgograd Oblast Location within Russia
- Coordinates: 48°39′N 45°22′E
- Country: Russia
- Region: Volgograd Oblast
- District: Leninsky District
- Time zone: UTC+4:00

Tsarev (Russian: Царев) is a rural locality (a selo) and the administrative center of Tsarevskoye Rural Settlement, Leninsky District, Volgograd Oblast, Russia. The population was 1,521, as of 2010. There are 19 streets.

== Geography ==
Tsarev is located on the left bank of the Akhtuba River, 19 km southeast of Leninsk (the district's administrative centre) by road. Saray is the nearest rural locality.
