= Nikitovka =

Nikitovka Никитовка
- Selo
- Location within Belgorod Oblast Location within Russia
- Coordinates: 50°21′N 38°25′E
- Country: Russia
- Region: Belgorod Oblast
- District: Krasnogvardeysky District
- Time zone: UTC+3:00

Nikitovka (Russian: Никитовка) is a rural locality (a selo) and the administrative center of Nikitovskoye Rural Settlement, Krasnogvardeysky District, Belgorod Oblast, Russia. The population was 526 as of 2010. There are 12 streets.

== Geography ==
Nikitovka is located 38 km (24 mi) south of Biryuch (the district's administrative centre) by road. Samarino is the nearest rural locality.
