= 7th Guards Tank Division =

Tank division of the Soviet military

7th Guards Tank Division (1945–1990) 7th Guards Tank Corps (1943–1945)
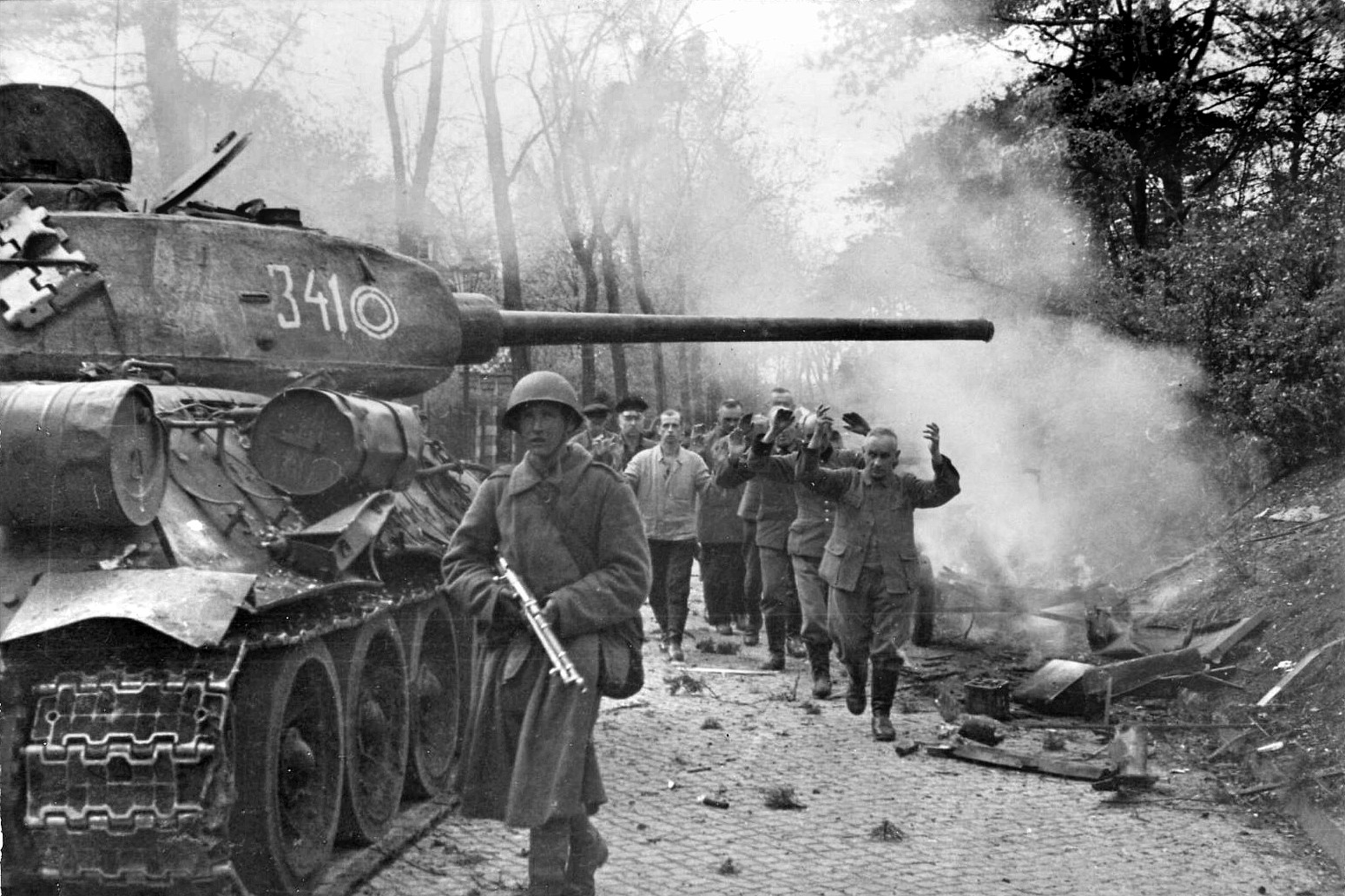
- A T-34 tank of the corps and surrendering Germans on the streets of Berlin
- Active: 1943–1990
- Country: Soviet Union
- Branch: Red Army / Soviet Army
- Type: Armor
- Garrison/HQ: Roßlau (1947–1990)
- Engagements: World War II; Operation Danube
- Decorations: Order of Lenin; Order of the Red Banner (2); Order of Suvorov, 2nd class
- Battle honours: Kiev; Berlin

Commanders
- Notable commanders: Filipp Rudkin; Sergei Ivanov; Vasily Mitrofanov

The 7th Guards Tank Division was a tank division of the Soviet Army during the Cold War.

The division traced its heritage back to the 7th Guards Tank Corps, formed during World War II in July 1943 from the 15th Tank Corps for its performance in Operation Kutuzov, the Soviet counteroffensive after the Battle of Kursk. It was part of the 3rd Guards Tank Army during the war, and was converted into a tank division like the rest of the tank corps in 1945. Stationed in Czechoslovakia postwar, it was briefly downsized into a regiment in 1946 and relocated to eastern Germany in 1947, becoming part of the Group of Soviet Occupation Forces in Germany, which later became the Group of Soviet Forces in Germany (GSFG). The division was stationed at Roßlau in East Germany for the rest of the Cold War and participated in the Warsaw Pact invasion of Czechoslovakia, Operation Danube, in August 1968. For much of the 1980s it formed part of the 3rd Red Banner Army. As the Cold War wound down, the troops of the GSFG, renamed the Western Group of Forces in 1989, were pulled out of Germany, and the 7th Guards Tank Division was withdrawn to Pyriatyn in Ukraine, where it became a storage base in July 1990.

== Operation Kutuzov ==
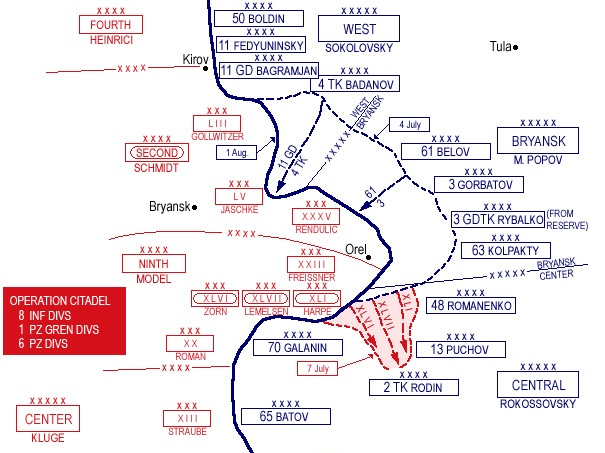
Soviet and German positions during Operation Kutuzov

On 26 July 1943, the 7th Guards Tank Corps, part of the 3rd Guards Tank Army on the Bryansk Front, was formed from the 15th Tank Corps in recognition of the "courage and bravery" of its actions in Operation Kutuzov, the Soviet counterattack after the Battle of Kursk, under the command of Major General Filipp Rudkin. The 88th Tank Brigade became the 54th Guards Tank Brigade, the 113th became the 55th Guards, the 195th became the 56th Guards, and the 17th Motor Rifle Brigade became the 23rd Guards. On the same day as it became a Guards unit, the corps and the rest of the army attempted to advance towards Stanovoy Kolodez, but were stopped by heavy fire after Soviet aerial reconnaissance detected a concentration of German tanks in the area of Mikhailovka and Pilatovka, and the advance of tank columns from Pilatovka to Stanovoy Kolodez. Further advance by the 3rd Guards Tank Army threatened to result in protracted and bloody positional battles, and thus in the late evening of the day the army was ordered to relocated to the Central Front to support the advance of the 48th Army on the front's right flank.

The 7th Guards were to concentrate in the area of Krasnaya Rybnitsa, Olgino, and Preobrazhenskoye by 22:00 on 27 July. Due to heavy rain that washed away dirt roads, the relocation of the army was not completed until 06:00 on the morning of 28 July. At 09:30, the army issued orders for the upcoming attack, in which the corps was to attack towards Nikolskoye, Nestorovo, and Khomuty, where it was to cross the Oka River and reach the line of Sebyakino and Korovye Boloto, supported by infantry from the 48th Army. The orders thus called for the army to advance 40 kilometers (25 mi) and cross both the Malaya Ribnitsa and Oka Rivers in half a day against prepared German fortifications on the left bank of the Malaya Ribnitsa. The attack began at 14:00, but by the end of the day the army's troops had only reached the Malaya Ribnitsa due to the inability of the infantry of the 48th Army, worn down in previous fighting, to provide effective support. The 7th Guards were advancing on Filosofovo and Nikolskoye in conjunction with the 91st Separate Tank Brigade at the end of the day.

At 21:00, the army issued new orders, which involved breaking through the German fortifications on 29 July and then reaching the Oka on 30 July. Throughout 29 July, the corps unsuccessfully attempted to advance through the German fortifications, but was again halted. Thant night, the Central Front ordered a continuation of the attack, with each of the army's corps supported by a mechanized brigade from the 7th Guards Mechanized Corps. The 34th Mechanized Brigade was assigned to the 7th Guards Tank Corps for the next day's attack. The assault was resumed on morning of 30 July, but the army achieved only modest success, with the 7th Guards Tank Corps seizing Nikolskoye.

In the evening, the front issued orders for a daylong pause in the offensive for reorganization, and a resumption of the attack on 1 August. This was changed by an order received by the army at 01:30 on 31 July, which directed that the army withdraw from the battle on the night of 1 August and reconcentrate 24–25 kilometers (15–16 mi) southwest of Rybnitsa. The army reached the new area at 05:00 on 2 August and spent the next two days receiving reinforcements and supplies. On the night of 3–4 August, the army was transferred to the area of Beldyazhki, Rzhava, and Puzeyevo to support the 13th Army's drive on the Kroma River. The 7th Guards were to cross the Kroma in the area of Kutafino and Krasnaya Roshcha, capture the Starognezdilovo area, and advance on Melikhovo, Soskovo, and Mytskoye.

Heavy German artillery fire and air strikes, coupled with terrain virtually inaccessible to tanks, hindered the crossing. As a result, a 200-meter (220 yd) dam was built in the corps' sector to enable the crossing of the marshes leading to the river, and by the end of the day, the army held positions on the southern bank of the Kroma from Novotroitsky to Kutafino. On the night of 4 August, army commander Pavel Rybalko issued orders directing the army's units to clear the approaches to the fords at night, capture a bridgehead on the northern bank of the river and transport the main forces there, and to attack and break through the German lines at dawn on 5 August, with the main forces of the army in a single echelon. The attack was scheduled to begin at 04:30 on 5 August, but the troops failed to capture the fords across the river and at dawn heavy fighting resumed along the army's front. A combined assault by three tank and motor rifle brigades of the 6th and 7th Guards Tank Corps managed to cross the river and take Glinki, but it was driven back by the end of the day under the pressure of a German infantry regiment with artillery, air, and tank support. Meanwhile, the corps' 54th Guards Tank Brigade captured the Kutafino crossing and began moving tanks over the river during the night.

Rybalko assessed the dispersion of the artillery support from both the 13th Army and 3rd Guards Tank Army as the reason for the failure of the attacks on 5 August, and in order to concentrate artillery fire along a shortened front he narrowed the army's attack towards Kalinovsky, Kalinov, and Troitsky, with the immediate objective of reaching the line of Krasny Pakhar and Ivanovsky. The 7th Guards were tasked with advancing on Krasny Pakhar and Ivanovsky from the area of Leshnya. Slowly driving back the German defenders in fierce fighting, the corps was unable to advance beyond the Leshnya area on 6 August. On 7 August, the corps was ordered to continue the attack towards Ivanovsky, further develop the breakthrough towards Melikhovo and capture the area of Martyanovo and Zyagintsevo. During the day, the corps captured Ivanovsky against slowly retreating German troops. For the next two days, they continued to advance against stubborn resistance, capturing Melikhovo by 9 August but being stopped at Soskovo that morning.

As the German forces fell back on heavily fortified heights at Soskovo, Gniloye Boloto and Martyanovo, their resistance intensified. After the army's initial attacks on the afternoon of 9 August failed, Rybalko created a shock group for the next day's attack, built around the 6th and 7th Guards Tank Corps, reinforced by the 91st Brigade, and supported by all of the army's artillery and two artillery regiments from the 13th Army. It was to bypass Soskovo from the north and develop the offensive towards Mytskoye. Despite heavy losses and ineffective artillery support due to ammunition shortages from the 13th Army, the shock group managed to overrun the heights, with the 7th Guards fighting on Soskovo's northern edge. The defending German 6th and 383rd Infantry Divisions also suffered heavy losses and began a retreat to the Vodocha River line.

Late on 10 August, the 3rd Guards Tank was ordered to be withdrawn from the front and concentrated in the area of Kalinov, Maslovo, and Apalkovo for reorganization and replenishment. On the night of 10–11 August, the army handed over its positions to the 13th Army's infantry units and moved to the rear in the specified concentration areas. Early on 12 August, the army was placed under the overall command of the 13th Army's commander, Nikolay Pukhov, who ordered it to form a combined tank brigade in each tank corps, intending to continue the assault on 13 August in the sector of 13th Army's 15th Rifle Corps. However, this was changed and on 13 August the 3rd Guards Tank was instead withdrawn to the Reserve of the Supreme High Command (RVGK), ending the army and the corps' fighting in Operation Kutuzov. By 17 August, it had been concentrated in the area of Maslovo, Zhuravlino, Nikolayevka, Panin, Petrik, and Tsvetovo, south of Kursk, receiving replacement personnel and equipment.

== Battle of the Dnieper ==
On 6 September, the army was ordered to begin moving to the Sumy area on 8 September and to complete the relocation by 15 September, when it was to join the Voronezh Front to fight in the Chernigov–Poltava Strategic Offensive, part of the Battle of the Dnieper. At this time the 7th Guards fielded 164 T-34 medium tanks, 21 SU-76 and 12 SU-152 self-propelled guns, and a single KV heavy tank. As planned, the army's troops relocated by road to the Sumy area, completing the 150-kilometer (93 mi) march by 13 September, but the equipment, moved by rail, was delayed due to the German airstrikes and destruction of railway ties during their retreat. While the army moved to the front, the Voronezh Front was advancing westward, and the deployment of the army to Sumy was no longer necessary. As a result, the army's place of concentration was switched to Romny, which was reached by 19 September after a march of 150–200 kilometers (93–124 mi). The army was tasked with pursuing the retreating German forces westwards towards Pryluky, Turovka, Yahotyn, Pereiaslav, and seizing a bridgehead south of Pereiaslav on the Dnieper, with the 6th and 7th Guards in the first echelon.

The westward advance from Romny began as scheduled at 20:00 on 20 September, but the army was not "in contact" with the retreating German troops. In order to speed up the pace of the offensive on 21 September, Rybalko ordered the formation of a forward detachment in each tank corps, consisting of motorized infantry, sappers, motorcyclists, an anti-tank artillery regiment, a Katyusha battalion, tanks and tank destroyers, and bridges if the situation permitted. The corps' mission for the day was to swiftly advance to the river and seize crossings in the sector of Khodorov and Traktomirov. Rybalko's decision to use mostly motorized infantry in the vanguard of the advance was due to fuel supply issues caused by German infrastructure destruction and traffic jams from Soviet troops using the same roads as refugees. By the end of the day, the corps' 54th Brigade had reached the Bukrin bend in the Dnieper River at Traktomirov. The bridgehead over the Dnieper in the area of Traktomirov, Andrushy, and Monastyrka that the corps captured in the following days became known as the Bukrin bridgehead. For the next month the 7th Guards fought in fierce fighting to expand the bridgehead.

== Kiev to Berlin ==
At the end of October and the beginning of November, the 7th Guards were secretly transferred from Bukrin to the Lyutezh bridgehead. The corps fought in the capture of Kiev during the Battle of Kiev, and received the honorific Kiev for its actions on 6 November. It then fought in fierce fighting against a large German counterattack southwest of Fastov, and for "displaying courage and valor and exemplary completion of combat missions", the corps was awarded its first Order of the Red Banner on 1 January 1944. The 7th Guards fought in the Zhitomir–Berdichev Offensive and the Proskurov–Chernovitsy Offensive in early 1944, and received a second Order of the Red Banner on 19 March for "skilled fighting" in the capture of Right-bank Ukraine.

During the Lvov–Sandomierz Offensive in July, the corps entered the fight through a narrow penetration under constant air attack and shelling, the Koltov Corridor. It attacked towards Lvov and on 27 July the corps' 56th Guards Tank Brigade fought in the capture of the city. Meanwhile, the 7th Guards' main forces bypassed the city from the north and reached the area south of Yavorov, cutting off the German troops in Lvov from the west. For its "valor and courage", the tank corps was awarded the Order of Suvorov, 2nd class, on 10 August. During the month it fought to retain the Sandomierz bridgehead on the Vistula, repulsing strong German counterattacks in the northern sector of the bridgehead.

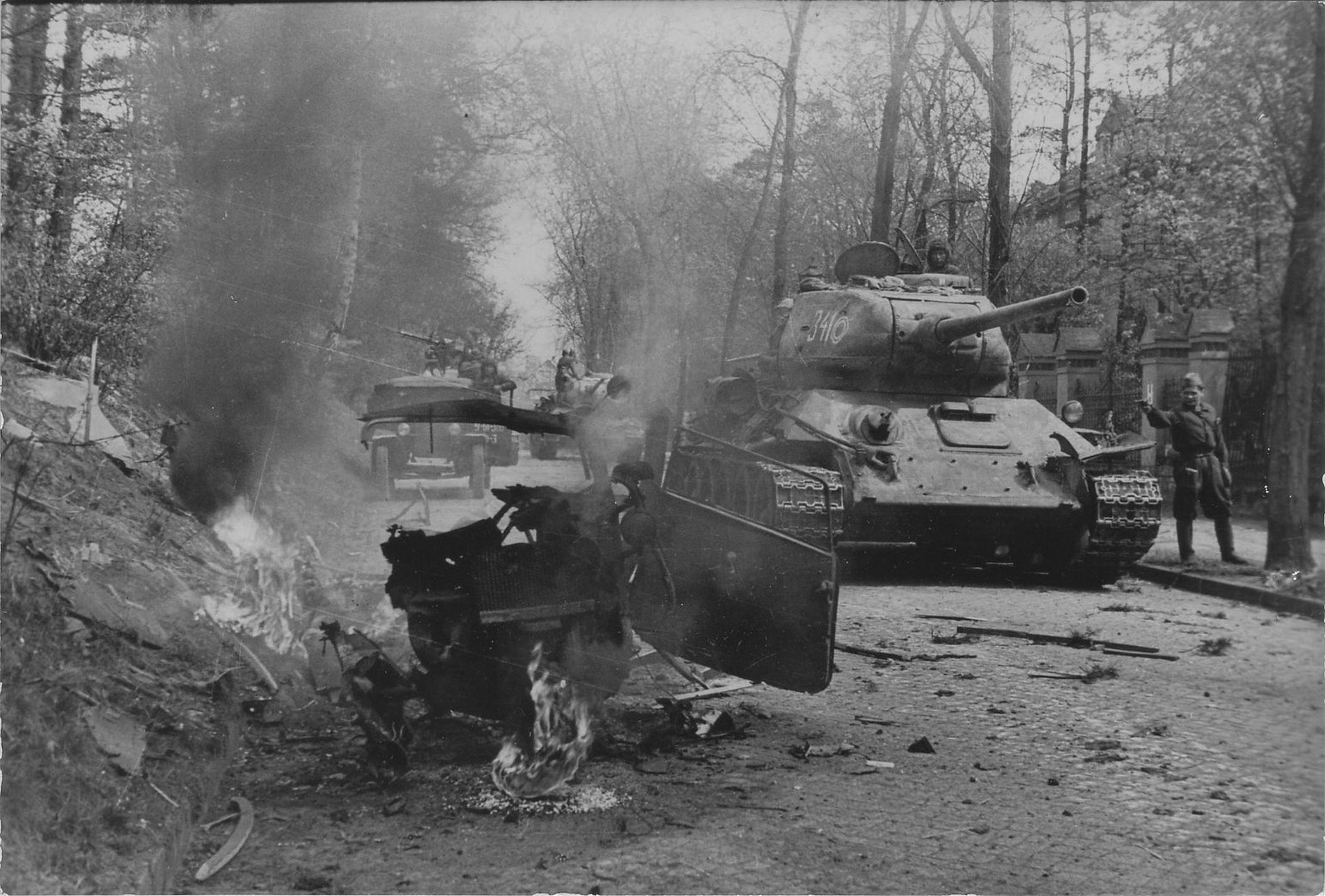
A column of T-34-85 tanks of the corps' 56th Guards Tank Brigade moves past a burning German vehicle in the suburbs of Berlin

In the Sandomierz–Silesian Offensive and Lower Silesian Offensive in early 1945, the 7th Guards advanced over 150 kilometers and captured fortified city of Częstochowa on the Warta alongside the 5th Guards Army's 31st Tank Corps on 17 January. In the Berlin Offensive, which began in mid-April, the corps advanced over 400 kilometers. For "exemplary completion of command tasks" during the breakthrough of German lines on the Neisse the corps was awarded the Order of Lenin on 28 May, and for distinguishing itself in the capture of Berlin the corps was awarded the honorific "Berlin" on 4 June. The 7th Guards' last combat operation was the Prague Offensive, during which it advanced south into Czechoslovakia and participated in the liberation of Prague. During the war, 45,000 soldiers of the corps were decorated and 64 received the title Hero of the Soviet Union. Aleksandr Golovachev, David Dragunsky, Zakhar Slyusarenko, and Semyon Khokhryakov were awarded the title twice.

== Cold War ==
In accordance with an order dated 10 June 1945, the corps was converted into the 7th Guards Tank Division, and the army became the 3rd Guards Mechanized Army. The corps' brigades became regiments with the same numbers. On the same day, the 3rd Guards Tank Army became part of the Central Group of Forces in the Pardubice area of Czechoslovakia, and in 1946 it was reduced to a separate mobilization tank division, with its subordinate units each dropping one level – divisions became regiments, and regiments became battalions. In the spring of 1947, the division was transferred to the Group of Soviet Occupation Forces in Germany (later the Group of Soviet Forces in Germany), stationed in east Germany, and the 7th Guards were relocated to Roßlau. The 3rd Guards Mechanized Army and its units returned to full strength in the spring of 1950. On 29 April 1957, the 3rd Guards Mechanized became the 18th Guards Army.

In August 1964, the 18th Guards Army headquarters was transferred to Alma Ata in Kazakhstan, and the division joined the 20th Guards Army by 1 March 1965. It was soon transferred to the 1st Guards Tank Army. In August and September 1968, the division participated in the Warsaw Pact invasion of Czechoslovakia, ending the Prague Spring, a period in which Czechoslovakia attempted democratization. By the early 1980s, the 7th Guards had been transferred to the 3rd Army. On 28 August 1988, the division's 650th Separate Rocket Battalion was transferred to the new 448th Rocket Brigade, formed from the rocket battalions of the 3rd Army.

In July 1990, the division was withdrawn to Pyriatyn in the Kiev Military District, where it was converted into the 4214th Guards Weapons and Equipment Storage Base as part of the 1st Guards Army. On 19 November 1990, the base included 187 T-64 main battle tanks, 11 BMP-1 amphibious infantry fighting vehicles, 15 BRM-1K command vehicles, 12 BM-21 Grad truck-mounted multiple rocket launcher systems, 30 R-145BM command vehicles, 3 RKhM-4 nuclear, biological, and chemical reconnaissance vehicles, 2 UR-67 mine-clearing vehicle, 6 MT-55A bridging vehicles, and 22 MT-LBT auxiliary armored personnel carriers.

In January 1992 it was taken over by Ukraine and renamed 121st Guards Weapons and Military Equipment Storage Base.

== Commanders ==
During World War II, the 7th Guards Tank Corps was commanded by the following officers:

- Major General Filipp Rudkin (27 July–6 August 1943)
- Major General Kirill Suleykov (7 August–13 December 1943)
- Major General Sergei Ivanov (14 December 1943 – 20 July 1944)
- Major General Vasily Mitrofanov (21 July–7 October 1944)
- Major General Sergei Ivanov (8 October 1944 – 10 April 1945)
- Major General Vasily Novikov (13 April–11 May 1945)

== Order of battle late 1980s ==
In the late 1980s, the division included the following units:

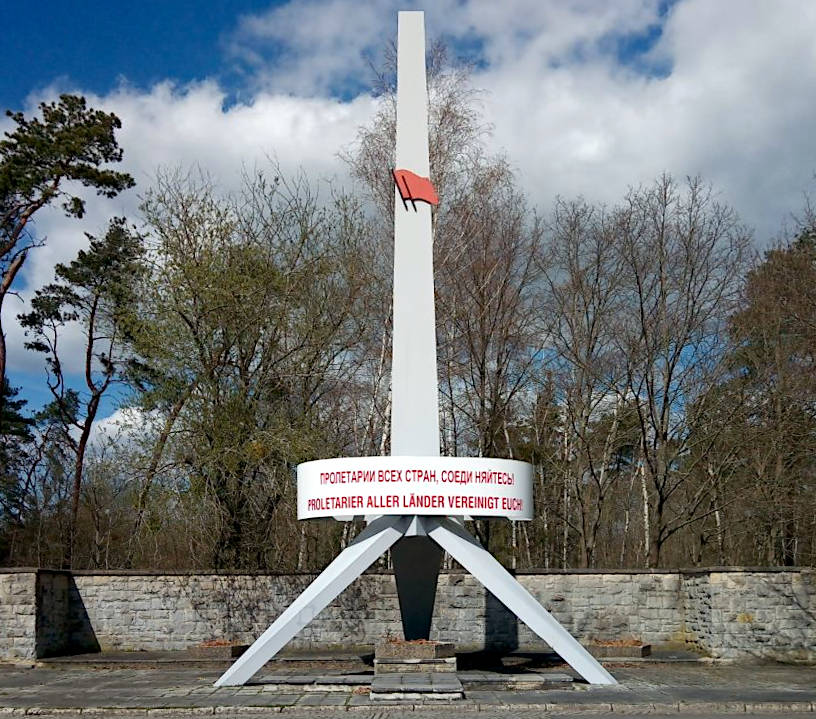
Monument in Roßlau

- 55th Guards Vasylkov Tank Regiment (Lutherstadt-Wittenberg)
- 56th Guards Vasylkov-Shepetovka Tank Regiment (Zerbst)
- 79th Guards Bobruisk Tank Regiment (Roßlau)
- 40th Berlin Motor Rifle Regiment (Bernburg)
- 670th Guards Lvov Self-Propelled Artillery Regiment (Cochstedt)
- 287th Guards Lvov Anti-Aircraft Rocket Regiment (Roßlau)
- 4th Separate Guards Reconnaissance Battalion (Quedlinburg-Quarmbeck)
- 146th Separate Guards Communications Battalion (Roßlau)
- 121st Separate Engineer Battalion (Roßlau)
- 165th Separate Chemical Defence Battalion (Roßlau)
- 183rd Separate Material Supply Battalion (Roßlau)
- 58th Separate Equipment Maintenance and Recovery Battalion (Roßlau)
- 186th Separate Medical Battalion (Dessau)
