= 264th Rifle Division =

- Active: 1st formation: July–September 1941; 2nd formation: February–October 1942; 3rd formation: July 1943 – 1955
- Country: Soviet Union
- Branch: Red Army
- Type: Rifle division
- Engagements: World War II
- Battle honours: Ussuri (3rd formation)

The 264th Rifle Division (Russian: 264-я стрелковая дивизия) was an infantry division of the Soviet Union's Red Army during World War II, formed three times.

The division was first formed in the summer of 1941 and destroyed in the Kiev pocket in the fall of that year. Reformed in February 1942, the division's second formation became a guards division for its actions in the Battles of Rzhev. Formed a third time in the summer of 1943 in the Soviet Far East, the division fought in the Soviet invasion of Manchuria in August and September 1945. Postwar, it was stationed in Sakhalin before it was renumbered in 1955.

== History ==
=== First Formation ===
The 264th began forming on 10 July 1941 at Poltava in the Kharkov Military District. Its basic order of battle included the 1056th, 1058th, and the 1060th Rifle Regiments. The division was barely formed and lacked much of its equipment when it was sent to the front on nine trains at the end of July. By 30 July, it was taking positions defending the line of the Dnieper near Kaniv, south of Kiev. By 5 August, the 264th was part of the Southwestern Front's 26th Army. It was trapped in the Kiev pocket in early September and destroyed almost immediately in the pocket. The 264th was officially disbanded on 19 September.

=== Second Formation ===
The second formation of the 264th began forming in February 1942 in the Ural Military District, including the basic order of battle as the first formation. By the time its commander was assigned on 1 May, the division had been relocated to the Moscow Military District. In May, it was assigned to the Moscow Defence Zone for training, and in August the 264th joined the 3rd Tank Army, part of the Reserve of the Supreme High Command behind the Western Front near Moscow. The division was part of the army's mobile group for several front-level offensives in 1942, which occasionally stretched the German defenses but never broke through. Thus, these actions were mostly ignored by Soviet accounts. The division fought in heavy fighting through the fall of 1942 around Rzhev, Sychyovka, and Zhizdra. On 20 October 1942, it was converted into the 48th Guards Rifle Division for its actions.

=== Third Formation ===
The division was formed for a third time on 20 July 1943 with the 35th Army in the Far Eastern Front. It included the same rifle regiments as the previous formations, and spent the entire war with the 35th Army. On 8 August 1945, the army was with the 1st Far East Front for the Soviet invasion of Manchuria, which began the next day. While other units of the army engaged in a speedy advance through the Japanese line, the 264th spent the entire campaign systematically reducing Japanese fortifications in and around Hutou in conjunction with the 109th Fortified Region. By the end of the invasion, the 264th was so far behind the rest of the army that it was assigned to the 87th Rifle Corps in the front reserves. For its actions, the division was awarded the honorific "Ussuri." Postwar, the 264th became part of the 15th Army at Dolinsk, where it was renumbered as the 41st Rifle Division in 1955.
