= Korolyov =

Korolyov, also transliterated as Korolev (Russian: Королёв), or its feminine variant Korolyova, Koroleva, (Королёва), is a Russian surname, and the name of multiple places in Russia. It is derived from the word korol (король), meaning "king".

Korolyov may refer to:

== People ==
- Aleksandr Korolyov (disambiguation), several people
- Alexey Korolev (born 1987), Kazakhstani ski jumper
- Andrey Korolev (1944–1999), Russian linguist
- Anton Korolev (born 1988), Russian ice hockey player
- Boris Korolev (1885–1963), Soviet sculptor
- Denis Borisovich Korolyov (born 1987), Russian footballer
- Dmitry Korolyov (born 1988), Russian footballer
- Ekaterina Koroleva (handballer) (1998–2019), Russian handballer
- Evgeny Korolev (born 1988), Kazakhstani tennis player
- Grigory Korolev (born 2006), Russian gaming influencer and nationalist
- Igor Korolev (1970–2011), Russian hockey player
- Katja Koroleva (Ekaterina "Katja" Koroleva) (born 1987), international soccer referee
- Lev Korolyov (disambiguation), multiple people
- Natasha Korolyova (born 1973), Russian singer of popular music
- Nikolay Korolyov (sergeant) (1921–1943), Hero of the Soviet Union
- Nikolay Korolyov (boxer) (1917–1974), Soviet boxer
- Oleg Korolyov (born 1952), governor of Lipetsk Oblast, Russia
- Oleg A. Korolev (born 1968), Russian artist
- Sergei Borisovich Korolyov (born 1962), Russian official
- Sergei Korolev (disambiguation), multiple people
- Sergei Alexandrovich Korolev (1874–1932), industrial microbiology creator
- Sergei Borisovich Korolev (born 1962), Russian intelligence officer and deputy director of the FSB
- Sergei Pavlovich Korolev (1907–1966), leading rocket engineer and designer of the Soviet Union
- Yaroslav Korolev (born 1987), Russian basketball player
- Yevgeni Korolyov (disambiguation), several people with this name
- Yuri Korolev (born 1962), gymnast
- Yuri Korolev (ice hockey) (1934–2026), Russian ice hockey administrator, coach and civil servant

== Places ==
- Korolyov, Moscow Oblast, a City Under Oblast Jurisdiction in Moscow Oblast, Russia
- Korolev (lunar crater), a Lunar crater named after Sergei Pavlovich Korolyov
- Korolev (Martian crater), a crater on Mars named after Sergei Pavlovich Korolyov
- 1855 Korolyov, an asteroid named in honour of Sergei Pavlovich Korolyov

== Other ==
- S.P. Korolev Rocket and Space Corporation Energia, an aerospace corporation named after Sergei Pavlovich Korolyov
- Korolyov RP-318, Russia's first rocket-powered aircraft, built by Sergei Pavlovich Korolyov
- "Korolev", a 2015 tune by Public Service Broadcasting
- Korolyov, a Ropucha-class landing ship in the Russian Navy
- Korolev, a spaceship in the TV series Stargate-SG1

== See also ==
- Korolov
