= Ghali Zakirov =

Soldier and hero of the Soviet union

Ghali Zakirovich Zakirov
- Гали Закирович Закиров
- Born: 1910; Bogatyje Saby village, Sabinsky District, Tatarstan, Russian Empire
- Died: February 1944 (aged 33–34); Ukrainian SSR
- Military career
- Allegiance: Soviet Union
- Branch: Airborne
- Service years: 1941–1944
- Rank: Junior sergeant
- Unit: 3rd Guards Airborne Division
- Conflicts: World War II; Battle of Demyansk; Battle of Kursk; Operation Kutuzov; Battle of the Dnieper
- Awards: Hero of the Soviet Union

Ghali Zakirov (Russian: Гали Закирович Закиров; 1910 – February 1944) was a Tatar Soviet soldier and Hero of the Soviet Union. Zakirov was awarded the title for his actions in the Battle of the Dnieper, where he reportedly killed over 100 German soldiers. He was killed in action a month after being awarded the title in January 1944.

== Early life ==
Zakirov was born in 1910 in Bogatyje Saby in Tatarstan to a peasant family. He received primary education and then became an agricultural worker. In 1940, he moved to Illinka village in the present-day Akzhar District, where he worked in the machine and tractor station.

== World War II ==
On 14 July 1941, Zakirov was drafted into the Red Army. In early 1942, he was seriously wounded. Zakirov spent six months convalescing in Bogatyje Saby and returned to the front in late 1942. Zakirov served in the 3rd Guards Airborne Division from February 1943. He fought in the Demyansk Offensive and Staraya Russa Offensive before the division was withdrawn to Maloarkhangelsk in April. In June 1943, the division became part of the Central Front. During the Battle of Kursk, the 3rd Guards Airborne were in the second line from 5 to 8 July but were moved into the front line from 8 to 12 July, where they, together with the 307th Rifle Division, stopped German counterattacks around Ponyri railway station. From 12 July to 18 August the division fought in Operation Kutuzov.

Zakirov participated in the Chernigov-Pripyat Offensive, where the division crossed the Desna River and then the Dnieper north of Kiev. In fighting to maintain its bridgehead over the Dnieper, Zakirov distinguished himself. By October 1943, he was a junior sergeant commanding a squad of the 3rd Battalion of the 8th Guards Airborne Regiment. On 5 October, near the village of Gubin, Zakirov and his squad advanced into the German trenches. Zakirov reportedly bayoneted 14 German soldiers. Continuing the attack, Zakirov and his squad reached the second line of defence. In the ensuing battle Zakirov's squad reportedly killed over 70 German soldiers, the remaining 50 reportedly fleeing. Zakirov reportedly hoisted a red flag on Height 125.7. The German troops launched three counterattacks, which Zakirov's squad of ten reportedly repulsed. During these battles, he reportedly killed over 100 German soldiers.

Zakirov later fought in the rest of the Battle of Kiev, and the Zhitomir–Berdichev Offensive. On 10 January 1944, he was awarded the Order of Lenin. He was killed in February 1944.

Busts of him are displayed in Bogatyje Saby and Ilinka.

== Personal life ==
Zakirov married Hazira before the war.
