= Nikolay Korolyov =

Nikolay Korolyov may refer to:

- Nikolay Korolyov (boxer) (1917–1974), Soviet boxer and Honoured Master of Sport
- Nikolay Korolyov (sergeant) (1921–1945), Soviet soldier and Hero of the Soviet Union
- Nikolay Korolyov (nationalist) (born 1981), Russian nationalist
