= Arapov =

Arapov (Russian: Арапов) is a Slavic masculine surname, its feminine counterpart is Arapova. It may refer to

- Alexis Arapoff, (1904–1948), Russo-Franco-American painter, also Arapov
- Alexei Arapov (1906–1943), Soviet military officer
- Boris Arapov (1905–1992), Russian composer
- Dmitri Arapov (born 1993), Russian football player
- Georgy Arapov (born 1999), Russian politician
- Mate Arapov (born 1976), Croatian sailor

== See also ==
- Arapov's contracture, a pain reflex
