= Vasily Mitrofanov =

Vasily Andreyevich Mitrofanov
- Mitrofanov c. 1945
- Born: 29 January [O.S. 16 January] 1899; Petrakovo, Vladimirsky Uyezd, Vladimir Governorate, Russian Empire
- Died: 25 August 1970 (aged 71) Moscow, Soviet Union
- Buried: Novodevichy Cemetery
- Allegiance: Russian SFSR; Soviet Union
- Branch: Red Army (later Soviet Army)
- Service years: 1918–1959
- Rank: Lieutenant general
- Commands: 12th Tank Corps; 7th Guards Tank Corps; 6th Guards Tank Corps; 3rd Guards Tank Division
- Conflicts: Russian Civil War; Basmachi Revolt; World War II
- Awards: Hero of the Soviet Union; Order of Lenin (3); Order of the Red Banner (4); Order of Suvorov, 1st and 2nd classes; Order of Bogdan Khmelnitsky, 2nd class

Vasily Andreyevich Mitrofanov (Russian: Васи́лий Андре́евич Митрофа́нов; 29 January [O.S. 16 January] 1899 – 25 August 1970) was a Soviet Army lieutenant general and Hero of the Soviet Union.

Mitrofanov joined the Red Army during the Russian Civil War and served as a staff clerk. After graduating from a commanders' school, he held staff positions during the 1920s and early 1930s in Central Asia before transferring to the emerging mechanized forces. During World War II, he served as acting commander of the 12th Tank Corps in late 1942 and early 1943 and as chief of staff of the 3rd Guards Tank Army between 1943 and 1944. He commanded the 7th and 6th Guards Tank Corps in 1944 and 1945 and for his leadership of the latter in the Battle of Berlin was made a Hero of the Soviet Union. Postwar, Mitrofanov served in armored forces staff positions and ended his career as an advisor to the East German National People's Army.

== Early life and Russian Civil War ==
Mitrofanov was born on 29 January 1899 to a peasant family of Russian ethnicity in the village of Petrakovo, Vladimir Governorate (now Sobinsky District, Vladimir Oblast). His parents brought him to Ryazan when they moved there in his childhood, and Mitrofanov was raised there by his grandfather, a railwayman, after the death of his father. He graduated from a gymnasium school in 1917. After joining the Red Army in September 1918 during the Russian Civil War, he became a Red Army man and assistant platoon commander in the 2nd Railway Defense and Security Regiment. He became a copyist on the staff of the 313th Rifle Regiment in April 1919 and in September transferred to serve as a clerk in the 304th Rifle Regiment. He continued to serve in that position at the headquarters of the Chief of Defense of the 4th District of the Moscow–Kazan Railway and then the 607th Western Field Hospital from April 1920 before returning to service as a Red Army man in the commandant's detachment of the 3rd Department of the Military Tribunal in April 1921. During the war, he participated in fighting on the Southern Front.

== Interwar period ==
Mitrofanov began studies at the 80th Infantry and Machine Gun Commanders' Courses in September 1921, and was transferred to the 27th Ivano-Voznesensk Infantry School, from which he graduated in September 1924. Sent to serve on the Turkestan Front with the 1st Turkestan Rifle Regiment as a platoon commander, assistant chief of the regimental school, assistant chief and then acting chief of staff of the regiment, he became assistant chief of the 1st section of the staff of the 1st Turkestan Mountain Rifle Division in September 1929. With these units, he served as chief of a detachment and chief of staff of a sector in the suppression of the Basmachi movement. He transferred to the 13th Mountain Rifle Regiment of the 3rd Turkestan Mountain Rifle Division in November 1931 to serve as its chief of staff.

Mitrofanov was sent to study at the Military Academy for Mechanization and Motorization in February 1933 and upon graduation in June 1937 became chief of the 2nd staff department of the 5th Mechanized Corps of the Belorussian Special Military District. From October 1938, he served as chief of the 1st staff department of the 15th Tank Corps, formed from the 5th Mechanized Corps. In this capacity, Mitrofanov participated in the Soviet invasion of Poland before entering the Military Academy of the General Staff in December 1939, from which he graduated in 1941.

== World War II ==
After Operation Barbarossa began, Mitrofanov was placed at the disposal of the commander-in-chief of the Northwestern Strategic Direction, and in September appointed chief of the Armored Forces of the 55th Army of the Leningrad Front. Appointed chief of staff of the 12th Tank Corps of the 3rd Tank Army of the Western Front in February 1942, he served as acting corps commander between 30 December and 16 January 1943. Mitrofanov participated in the Ostrogozhsk–Rossosh Offensive, Operation Star, and the Third Battle of Kharkov in early 1943.

He was selected to be chief of staff of the 3rd Guards Tank Army in the order forming it оn 14 May and was promoted to major general of tank forces on 7 June. The army fought in Operation Kutuzov as part of the Bryansk Front from July. From September the army fought in the Battle of the Dnieper, the Battle of Kiev, the Zhitomir–Berdichev Offensive, and the Proskurov–Chernovitsy Offensive. As chief of staff of the army, Mitrofanov was evaluated as having "taken an active role in the planning of army operations, ensuring unbroken command and control of forces in accordance with the decisions of the army commander," and "displaying excellent staff education and knowledge of operational art." He became army deputy commander in May 1944 and took command of the army's 7th Guards Tank Corps in July after its commander was wounded. Mitrofanov led the corps in successful attacks during the Lvov–Sandomierz Offensive, in which it captured Gorodok and Lvov, and fought in battles for the Sandomierz bridgehead. For its courage and skill in these battles, his corps was awarded the Order of Suvorov.

Appointed commander of the 6th Guards Tank Corps (the former 12th Tank Corps) of the army in January 1945, Mitrofanov led it in the breakout from the Sandomierz bridgehead during the Sandomierz–Silesian Offensive. The corps advanced 500 kilometers (310 mi) in the operation and went on to fight in the Berlin Offensive. In April, during the latter, Mitrofanov, leading from the front, commanded the corps in its breakthrough of the German defenses on the Neisse and the fortified point of Gross Bademeisel, south of Forst, and the crossing of the Spree. The corps then crossed the Teltow Canal and advanced into the city of Berlin from the south. For his actions, Mitrofanov was awarded the title Hero of the Soviet Union and the Order of Lenin on 29 May 1945, while the corps received the name of Berlin as an honorific. At the end of the war, the corps participated in the defeat of the German troops at Dresden and in the Prague Offensive reached Prague.

Hero of the Soviet Union citation

During the operations of the army to take the city of Berlin from 16 April 1945, Comrade Mitrofanov, commanding the corps, proved himself to be a bold and decisive general. Constantly with the combat units of the corps, Comrade Mitrofanov boldly led the corps forward to capture the capital of Germany, the city of Berlin. The units of the corps, led by Comrade Mitrofanov, broke through the strongly fortified and deeply echeloned German defenses on the Neisse river, forced the Spree river, and rapidly advanced, breaking through the strongly fortified defensive lines on the approaches to Berlin, capturing the cities of Vetschau, Lübbenau, Golssen, Baruth, and Zossen. On 22 April 1945, [they] captured the [following] strongly defended enemy-held [fortified] points on the approaches to Berlin: Teltow, forced [the] Teltow canal, and burst into the city of Berlin from the south. Waging heavy street battles, elements of the corps inflicted heavy losses in manpower and equipment on the enemy and captured the following districts of the city of Berlin: Lichterfelde, Dahlem, Schmargendorf, and reached Wilmersdorf. For [his] skillful and courageous leadership and the successful combat operations of the units of the corps upon entering the capital of Germany, the city of Berlin, inflicting heavy losses in manpower and equipment on the enemy, for courage and heroism displayed in the fighting, Comrade Mitrofanov [is] worthy of the title Hero of the Soviet Union with presentation of the Order of Lenin and the Gold Star Medal.

== Postwar ==
After the end of the war, in May 1946, Mitrofanov, who had been promoted to lieutenant general on 27 June 1945, became deputy commander of the 3rd Guards Tank Army, and in February 1947 was appointed commander of the army, reduced to a tank division in the Group of Soviet Occupation Forces in Germany. He served as commander of the armored and mechanized forces of the Leningrad Military District from May 1950, chief of the Combat Training Directorate of the Armored and Mechanized Forces from January 1953, and Chief of the Directorate of Higher Educational Institutions and Training Units of the Armored Forces from January 1954. In June 1956 he became senior military advisor to the commander of the Armored Forces of the East German National People's Army. He retired in March 1959 and lived in Moscow, where he died on 25 August 1970. Mitrofanov was buried at the Novodevichy Cemetery.

== Awards and honors ==
Mitrofanov was a recipient of the following decorations:

Soviet Union

Hero of the Soviet Union
Order of Lenin, thrice
Order of the Red Banner, four times
Order of Suvorov, 1st class
Order of Suvorov, 2nd class
Order of Bogdan Khmelnitsky, 2nd class
Medal "For Battle Merit"
Medal "For the Defence of Leningrad"
Medal "For the Liberation of Prague"
Medal "For the Capture of Berlin" (1945)
Medal "For the Victory over Germany in the Great Patriotic War 1941–1945" (1945)
Jubilee Medal "XX Years of the Workers' and Peasants' Red Army" (1938)

Foreign

War Cross 1939–1945, twice (Czechoslovakia)
Distinguished Service Medal of the National People's Army, Bronze (East Germany)
Order of the Cross of Grunwald, 1st class (Poland)
Knight of the Virtuti Militari (Poland)
Medal "For Oder, Neisse and the Baltic" (Poland)
Medal of Victory and Freedom 1945 (Poland)
