= Aleksandr Yunev =

Red Army senior lieutenant

Aleksandr Petrovich Yunev
- Александр Петрович Юнёв
- Born: 28 September 1924; Krasavka village, Fyodorovsky District, Saratov Oblast
- Died: 18 February 1952 (aged 27)
- Military career
- Allegiance: Soviet Union
- Branch: Red Army
- Service years: 1942–1952
- Rank: Senior lieutenant
- Unit: 3rd Guards Airborne Division
- Conflicts: World War II
- Awards: Hero of the Soviet Union; Order of Lenin; Order of the Red Star

Aleksandr Petrovich Yunev (Russian: Александр Петрович Юнёв; 28 September 1924 – 18 February 1952) was a Red Army senior lieutenant and Hero of the Soviet Union.Yunev was awarded the title for his actions in Operation Spring Awakening for his part in repulsing numerous German attacks. Postwar, Yunev continued to serve in the army and died in 1952 as a result of his war wounds.

== Early life ==
Yunev was born on 28 September 1924 in Krasavka village in Fyodorovsky District, Saratov Oblast to a peasant family. He graduated from ninth grade and worked as a kolkhoz tractor driver.

== World War II ==
Yunev was drafted into the Red Army in 1942. He fought in World War II from August 1942. Yunev fought at the Battle of Stalingrad and the Battle of Kursk. He was wounded five times. He joined the Communist Party of the Soviet Union in 1944. On 24 September, he was awarded the Order of the Red Star for his actions in command of an 82mm mortar crew of the 163rd Rifle Division's 759th Rifle Regiment. Yunev became a machine gun platoon leader in the 2nd Guards Airborne Regiment of the 3rd Guards Airborne Division. During Operation Spring Awakening, Yunev distinguished himself.

On 7 March 1945, the platoon took up defensive positions near the village of Sheregeyesh, west of Lake Balaton. After a ten-minute artillery bombardment, two German battalions and seven tanks attacked the positions. Yunev's machine gun fire killed numerous German soldiers, repulsing the attack. On 10 March, Yunev and his platoon repulsed another counterattack, killing 83 German soldiers. On 13 March, he was wounded.

On 29 June 1945, Yunev was awarded the title Hero of the Soviet Union for his actions, as well as the Order of Lenin.

== Later life ==
In 1948, he graduated from the Tashkent Tank School and served in the Central Group of Forces. He died on 18 February 1952, a result of his war wounds. Yunev was buried in Vienna.

Streets in Krasavka and Mokrous were named for him.
