= Mikhail Solovyov (lieutenant) =

Soviet army lieutenant (1917–1943)

Mikhail Grigoryevich Solovyov
- Михаил Григорьевич Соловьёв
- Born: 1917; Sluzna village, Spas-Demensky District, Kaluga Oblast
- Died: 7 October 1943 (aged 25–26) near Medwin village, Ivankiv Raion, Kiev Oblast, Ukrainian SSR
- Military career
- Allegiance: Soviet Union
- Branch: Red Army
- Service years: 1942–1943
- Rank: Lieutenant
- Unit: 3rd Guards Airborne Division
- Conflicts: World War II; Battle of Kursk; Battle of the Dnieper
- Awards: Hero of the Soviet Union

Mikhail Grigoryevich Solovyov (Russian: Михаил Григорьевич Соловьёв; 1917 – 7 October 1943) was a Red Army Lieutenant and posthumous Hero of the Soviet Union. Solovyov was posthumously awarded the title for his leadership of a company during the Battle of the Dnieper, in which he reportedly killed 31 German soldiers. Solovyov was killed in action during the Battle of the Dnieper.

== Early life ==
Solovyov was born in 1917 in Sluzna village, Spas-Demensky District, Kaluga Oblast, in a peasant family. After the completion of his education, he worked as a teacher. In 1941, he graduated from the Moscow Law Institute. He worked as an investigator in the Moscow Oblast NKVD.

== World War II ==
In August 1942, he joined the Red Army. In 1943, he graduated from the Moscow Infantry School. He was at the front from July 1943, fighting in the Battle of Kursk. Solovyov was awarded the Order of the Red Star for actions during that battle. As a company commander in the 10th Guards Airborne Regiment of the 3rd Guards Airborne Division, Solovyov fought in the Battle of the Dnieper. On 2 October 1943, his company captured Medwin village on the right bank of the Dnieper. In the battle, 65 German soldiers were killed. Retreating, the Germans attempted to make a stand at Hill 120. Solovyov led his company in the attack, reportedly killing 8 German soldiers. The hill was captured and the pursuit was continued. Solovyov's company advanced too far and was surrounded. At night, the company broke out. During these actions, he reportedly killed more than 20 Germans. On 7 October, he reportedly killed 11 Germans. During this engagement, Solovyov was killed.

On 10 January 1944, Solovyov was posthumously awarded the title Hero of the Soviet Union and an Order of Lenin. He was buried in Hornostaipil.
