= Pyotr Kuznetsov (soldier) =

Soviet army junior sergeant (1925–1981)

Pyotr Ivanovich Kuznetsov
- Пётр Иванович Кузнецов
- Born: 30 January 1925; Zelony Luzhok village, Suvorovsky District, Tula Oblast, RSFSR, Soviet Union
- Died: 14 May 1981 (aged 56); Kaluga, Soviet Union
- Military career
- Service years: 1942–1943
- Rank: Junior Sergeant
- Unit: 3rd Guards Airborne Division
- Conflicts: World War II; Battle of Kiev
- Awards: Hero of the Soviet Union

Pyotr Ivanovich Kuznetsov (Russian: Пётр Иванович Кузнецов; 30 January 1925 – 14 May 1981) was a Red Army junior sergeant during World War II and a Hero of the Soviet Union. Kuznetsov was awarded the title for his actions in the 1943 Battle of Kiev, where he reportedly killed 41 German soldiers. He was seriously wounded and discharged soon after. After the war, Kuznetsov lived in Kaluga.

== Early life ==
Kuznetsov was born 30 January 1925 in the village of Zelony Luzhok in the Suvorovsky District of Tula Oblast to a peasant family. After graduating from seventh grade, he worked on a collective farm.

== World War II ==
Kuznetsov was drafted in 1942. He was sent to the 2nd Guards Airborne Regiment in the 3rd Guards Airborne Division in 1943. Kuznetsov became a squad leader in the regiment's 2nd Battalion with the rank of junior sergeant.

He fought in the Battle of Kiev in October, his first battle. On 6 October 1943, near the village of Gubin in Chernobyl Raion, Kuznetsov reportedly rushed into a German trench with his squad. He then reportedly bayoneted a machine gun crew, turned it around and opened fire on the German soldiers, reportedly killing 32 soldiers and an officer. The German troops soon counterattacked and Kuznetsov reportedly repulsed it by throwing two grenades, reportedly killing six German soldiers. In the ensuing hand-to-hand fighting, he reportedly bayoneted another two soldiers but was wounded. In a later battle, he was severely wounded and discharged in late 1943.

He was awarded the title Hero of the Soviet Union on 10 January 1944 for his actions, along with the Order of Lenin.

== After the war ==
He lived in Kaluga and died on 14 May 1981.
