= Korolov =

Korolov (feminine: Korolova) is a Slavic surname. It may be a transliteration of the Ukrainian surname Корольов (Korolyov). It may also be the Bulgarian surname Королов. Notable people with the surname include:

- Aleksandra Korolova, Latvian-American computer scientist
- Olga Korolova, better known as Korolova (DJ) (born 1988), Ukrainian music producer and DJ
- Yana Korolova, Ukrainian actress

== See also ==
- Koroloff, another transliteration of Королов
