= 3rd Guards Airborne Division =

- Active: 1942–1945
- Country: Soviet Union
- Allegiance: Red Army
- Branch: Airborne
- Size: Division
- Engagements: World War II; Demyansk Offensive; Battle of Kursk; Battle of Kiev; Zhitomir–Berdichev Offensive; Uman–Botoșani Offensive; Second Jassy–Kishinev Offensive; Battle of Debrecen; Siege of Budapest; Operation Spring Awakening; Vienna Offensive
- Decorations: Order of the Red Banner; Order of Suvorov, 2nd class Order of Kutuzov, 2nd class
- Battle honours: Uman

Commanders
- Notable commanders: Ivan Nikitich Konev (8 December 1942 – 19 November 1945)

The 3rd Guards Airborne Division was a Red Army division of World War II. In December 1945 it appears to have become 125th Guards Rifle Division, while serving with 35th Guards Rifle Corps, 27th Army, Carpathian Military District.

== History ==
The 3rd Guards Airborne Division was formed on 8 December 1942 after the disbanding of the 8th Airborne Corps. The division was placed under the 1st Shock Army on 6 February 1943 for the attack on the Demyansk Pocket. When the attack began on 26 February, the attached tanks of the 37th Separate Tank Regiment became bogged down in the snow, and German resistance slowed the advance. The division captured Sosnovka by 5 March and was on the eastern bank of the Porus River on 11 March. On the next night, the division was replaced by the 9th Guards Airborne Division.

The division was reassigned to the 53rd Army south of Maloarkhangelsk. As part of the 13th Army and 60th Army, the 3rd Guards Airborne fought in the Battle of Kursk and the Chernigov-Pripyat Offensive. On 9 September, the division captured Bakhmach. After capturing Oster, the division crossed the Desna River and fought to expand the bridgehead on the right bank of the Dnieper to Hornostaipil.

The division fought in the Battle of Kiev, capturing Dymer, Radomyshl and Korostyshiv. In November and December 1943, the 3rd Guards Airborne thwarted German counterattacks in the Kiev defensive operation. It then fought in the Zhitomir–Berdichev Offensive. In January and February 1944, the division fought in the Battle of the Korsun–Cherkassy Pocket. On 3 March 1944, the division became part of the 35th Guards Rifle Corps of the 27th Army. Three days later, the division crossed the Hirsky Tikych, which allowed the capture of Khrystynivka and Uman, for which it was given the title Uman.

Fighting in the Uman–Botoșani Offensive, the division crossed the Southern Bug, the Dniester and the Prut, capturing Trostianets, Ladyzhyn, Tulchyn and Mohyliv-Podilskyi. On 26 March, the division reached the Prut after capturing Edineț on the Romanian border. For its performance in crossing of the Dniester and the Prut, the division was awarded the Order of the Red Banner and the Order of Suvorov 2nd class. The division crossed the Siret River at Pașcani and held the bridgehead against counterattacks. After the end of the offensive, the division rested before the Second Jassy–Kishinev Offensive. On 20 August, in concert with the 104th Rifle Corps, the division attacked in the direction of Bacău, Vaslui and Huși, seeking to destroy Army Group South Ukraine.

The division attacked Hill 155 in cooperation with the 27th Guards Tank Brigade, capturing the first and second trenches. The 8th Guards Airborne captured Hill 177, a center of German resistance, within 8 hours. The 8th and 10th Guards Airborne broke through the German line and crossed the Bahlui River. On 25 August, the division captured Bârlad, which forced the Germans back to Focșani and Ploiești. On the 27th, the division captured Focșani and then Ploiești in cooperation with the 93rd Guards Rifle Division. The division advanced 296 kilometers and had reached Turda by 15 September.

In the Battle of Debrecen, the 3rd Guards Airborne captured Cluj-Napoca and entered Hungary. On the night of 7 November, the division crossed the Tisza and took Füzesabony on 11 November. In conjunction with the 110th Guards Rifle Division, the division captured Eger on 30 November. Moving westward, the division entered Czechoslovakia on 1 January 1945. The division stopped counterattacks during the Siege of Budapest. In March 1945, the division repelled Operation Spring Awakening. After assisting the 4th Guards Army in the capture of Székesfehérvár on 22 March, in an action for which it gained the Order of Kutuzov 2nd class, the division captured Zalaegerszeg on 29 March.

Days later, the division entered Austria at Fürstenfeld. The division entered Graz on 9 May at the end of the war and met British troops on the Mur at Bruck an der Mur. The 3rd Guards Airborne became part of the Southern Group of Forces on 15 June and returned to Tulchyn on 13 August. On 20 December 1945 it became the 125th Guards Rifle Division with the 35th Guards Rifle Corps. The 125th Guards Rifle Division was disbanded sometime in 1946.

== Composition ==
- 2nd Guards Airborne Regiment
- 8th Guards Airborne Regiment
- 10th Guards Airborne Regiment
- 2nd Guards Airborne Artillery Regiment
- 4th Guards Separate Antitank Battalion
- 7th Guards Separate Reconnaissance Company
- 9th Guards Sapper Battalion

== Awards ==
=== Heroes of the Soviet Union ===
- Alexei Arapov
- Oleg Kokushkin
- Alexander Kolesov
- Ivan Nikitich Konev
- Nikolay Korolyov
- Pyotr Kuznetsov
- Georgy Morosov
- Pavel Papin
- Alexey Polosin
- Mikhail Solovyov
- Nikolai Usenko
- Aleksandr Yunev
- Ghali Zakirov
