= Ivan Nikitich Konev =

Soviet military commander

- Native name: Иван Никитич Конев
- Born: 5 January 1899 (N.S.); Sheshminskaya Krepost village, Bugulminsky Uyezd, Samara Governorate, Russian Empire
- Died: 19 November 1973 (aged 74) Kuibyshev, Soviet Union
- Allegiance: Russian Empire (1916–1917); Soviet Union (1918–1955)
- Rank: Major general
- Commands: 8th Airborne Corps; 3rd Guards Airborne Division; 23rd Mechanized Division; 106th Guards Airborne Division
- Conflicts: World War I; Russian Civil War; Polish–Soviet War; Battle of Khalkin Gol; World War II
- Awards: Hero of the Soviet Union; Order of Lenin (3); Order of the Red Banner (4); Order of Suvorov 2nd class; Order of Kutuzov 2nd class; Order of the Red Star

Ivan Nikitich Konev (Russian: Иван Никитич Конев; 5 January 1899 – 19 November 1983) was a Soviet major general during World War II and a Hero of the Soviet Union. Konev led the 3rd Guards Airborne Division through most of the war and was awarded the title Hero of the Soviet Union for his leadership of the division during the Second Jassy–Kishinev Offensive. Postwar, Konev continued to serve in the Soviet Army and became the deputy commander of multiple army corps.

== Early life and Russian Civil War ==
Ivan Nikitich Konev was born on 5 January 1899 in Sheshminskaya Krepost village in Samara Governorate to a peasant family. In 1913, he graduated from sixth grade and in 1915 he was working as a messenger and labourer in Baku.

In May 1916, he joined the Imperial Russian Army and was a junior non-commissioned officer. He graduated from the Navartlukskoy Ensigns School. Konev was demobilized in December 1917. After the October Revolution, he became the secretary of the Sheshminskaya Parish Executive Committee. In January 1918, he volunteered for the Bulguminsky Uyezd Red Guards.

In June 1918, he joined the Red Army. Konev served as the assistant chief of the district food requisition unit. In September, he became an assistant company commander in the 240th Rifle Regiment on the Eastern Front. He participated in the fighting against Alexander Kolchak's forces and became an assistant clerk on the regimental staff. Konev became an assistant director of the 68th Army Staging Unit of the 5th Army in July 1919. He served as an assistant commander, company commander, clerk and treasurer of the unit. In 1920, he was transferred to the Western Front and participated in the Polish–Soviet War as the commander of the 101st Staging Company. He joined the Communist Party of the Soviet Union in the same year.

== Interwar ==
In June 1921, Konev was appointed assistant company commander in the Higher Military School of Siberia. He later became the quartermaster at the school. In January 1922, he became head of the quartermaster department and later the commander of the 24th Infantry School at Omsk. Konev transferred to the 29th Rifle Division in November and became that division's quartermaster. In January 1924, he became a platoon commander in the 85th Rifle Regiment. During the same year, he became reconnaissance company commander in the 87th Rifle Regiment. In 1926, he graduated from the Western Infantry School.

In October 1927, he became a company commander in the 111th Rifle Regiment. From December 1930 to April 1933, he was assistant battalion commander, battalion chief of staff, and assistant chief of staff of the 97th Rifle Regiment. He was sent to the Frunze Military Academy and graduated in 1936. From February to July 1937, he was head of the 2nd staff department of the 1st Motorized Chemical Division. In 1939, he graduated from the Military Academy of the General Staff.

During July 1939, Konev served with the 57th Special Rifle Corps at the Battles of Khalkhin Gol. In October, he became chief of staff of the 36th Motorized Division. In September 1940, Konev transferred to the Siberian Military District and became chief of staff of the 91st Rifle Division.

== World War II ==
The division was sent to the front in July 1941 with the 24th Army and Konev was seriously wounded in the Battle of Smolensk on 24 July. Konev recovered by September and became chief of staff of the 7th Airborne Corps. In July 1942, he became chief of staff of the 1st Airborne Corps and later became head of a staff department at Airborne Troops headquarters. In August 1942, he became commander of the 8th Airborne Corps. On 8 December 1942, the corps became the 3rd Guards Airborne Division.

Between January and March 1943, the division fought in the Battle of Demyansk with the 1st Shock Army. In late March, the division was relocated to the 13th Army at Ponyri in the Kursk Bulge. From 5 to 12 July, the division fought in the Battle of Kursk. On 16 July, the division went on the offensive during Operation Kutuzov and reportedly killed 9,600 German soldiers, knocking out 33 tanks. On 28 July, Konev was awarded the Order of the Red Banner. The division then fought in the Chernigov-Pripyat Offensive. Advancing westward, the division crossed the Ukrainian border in late August. In September, the division crossed the Dnieper after capturing Oster. It then fought bloody battles to retain the bridgehead. On 11 November, the division fought in the capture of Radomyshl during the Battle of Kiev.

In January 1944, Konev led the division in the Battle of the Korsun–Cherkassy Pocket. On 10 January, he received the Order of Kutuzov 2nd class. From 5 March, the division fought in the Uman–Botoșani Offensive and captured Hristinovka railway station, which made the capture of Uman possible on 10 March. For its actions, the division was awarded the honorific "Uman" for its actions. Between 15 and 19 March, the division captured Tulchyn and Mohyliv-Podilskyi. It then fought in the Second Jassy–Kishinev Offensive during the summer. On 20 August, the 3rd Guards Airborne broke through the defensive line northwest of Iași ("Jassy"). By the end of 27 August, the division had reportedly advanced 300 kilometers and captured 200 settlements. It also reportedly killed 2,559 German and Romanian soldiers, 47 guns, 12 tanks and captured 3,918 enemy soldiers and 62 guns. On 30 August, the division captured Ploiești. On 13 September 1944, Konev was awarded the title of Hero of the Soviet Union and the Order of Lenin for "courage and heroism displayed in the command of his division". On 19 September, he was promoted to major general.

The division then fought in the Battle of Debrecen. On 11 October, it helped capture Cluj-Napoca. The division advanced into Hungary and fought in the Budapest Offensive. On 30 November, it captured Eger. The division then crossed the Tisza and repulsed German counterattacks. The division then defended against German attacks in Operation Spring Awakening in March 1945. During late March, the division advanced westward and capture Zalaegerszeg. In early April, the division reached Austria and captured Fürstenfeld in the Vienna Offensive. By 9 May the division was at Graz, where Konev learned that the war was over and met with British troops.

Konev participated in the Moscow Victory Parade of 1945 on 24 June.

== Postwar ==
In June 1946, he became the commander of the 23rd Mechanized Division. A month later, he became the commander of the 106th Guards Airborne Division. In June 1947, he became chief of staff of the 137th Rifle Corps. He became its deputy commander in October 1948. Konev transferred to become deputy commander of the 14th Guards Rifle Corps in April 1952.

He retired in June 1955 and moved to Kuibyshev and died there on 19 November 1983. Konev is buried in the Rubezhnom Cemetery in Samara. Secondary School No.100 in Samara is named after Konev.
