= Sergei Korolev (disambiguation) =

Sergei Korolev was a Soviet rocket engineer and spacecraft designer.

Sergei Korolev may also refer to:

- Sergei Alexandrovich Korolev (1874–1932), Russian microbiologist who founded industrial microbiology
- Sergei B. Korolev (born 1962), Russian intelligence officer
- Soviet ship Akademik Sergey Korolyov, a Soviet tracking ship

== See also ==
- Korolyov (disambiguation)
