= Aleksandr Korolyov =

Aleksandr Korolyov may refer to:

- Aleksandr Ivanovich Korolyov (born 1958), Transnistrian politician
- Aleksandr Petrovich Korolyov (born 1953), Russian football coach

== See also ==
- Korolyov (disambiguation)
