= Pavel Papin =

Hero of the Soviet Union

Pavel Andreyevich Papin
- Павел Андреевич Папин
- Born: 16 June 1905; Lipetsk, Tambov Governorate, Russian Empire
- Died: 12 March 1945 (aged 39) near Székesfehérvár, Hungary
- Burial place: Székesfehérvár
- Military career
- Allegiance: Soviet Union
- Branch: Red Army
- Service years: 1926–1929; 1941–1945
- Rank: Sergeant
- Unit: 3rd Guards Airborne Division
- Conflicts: World War II †
- Awards: Hero of the Soviet Union; Order of Lenin; Order of the Red Banner; Order of Glory, 3rd class

Pavel Andreyevich Papin (Russian: Павел Андреевич Папин; 16 June 1905 – 12 March 1945) was a Red Army sergeant and posthumous Hero of the Soviet Union. Papin was awarded the title Hero of the Soviet Union and the Order of Lenin for his actions during Operation Spring Awakening, during which he threw himself under the tracks of a German tank.

== Early life ==
Papin was born on 16 June 1905 in Lipetsk, Tambov Governorate, from a family of workers. After the completion of his education, he worked on the construction of the Novolipetsk Metallurgical Combine. In 1925, he married Varvara Sitnikova Gavrilovna, who in 1926 gave birth to Nina and in 1933 to Valentin. Drafted in 1926, he was transferred to the reserve in 1929. He returned to Lipetsk and worked in the city Vodokanal. In 1931, he became the head of the Lipetsk Vodokanal, managing the water supply of the city.

== World War II ==
On 23 June 1941, Papin was drafted again. He fought on the Northwestern Front, leading elements of the 179th Separate Antiaircraft Battalion. On 19 August 1941, Papin was wounded. During evacuation, his group was attacked by German machine gunners. Despite his wound, Papin reportedly killed three German soldiers, forcing them to flee. After recovery, Papin went back to the front in January 1942. He was appointed acting commander of the mortar platoon of the 508th Rifle Regiment of the 85th Rifle Division of the Kalinin Front. He participated in the Rzhev-Vyazma Offensive. In the capture of Korovino village, Papin's mortars suppressed five German firing positions, allowing the attack to succeed. He was seriously injured again on 22 January 1942.

After long convalescence, Papin returned to the front in January 1944. He was assigned to the 10th Guards Airborne Regiment of the 3rd Guards Airborne Division. On 21 May, in fighting for a bridgehead on the Siret River, Papin was wounded, but did not leave the battlefield. On 30 November, he was among the first into Eger, where his platoon cleared the streets and buildings of German soldiers, helping the advance of the battalion. Papin was awarded the Order of the Red Banner and the Order of Glory 3rd class for his leadership.

Papin became commander of the machine gun platoon of the regiment. The platoon repulsed five attacks by 40 German tanks and infantry during Operation Spring Awakening near Székesfehérvár on 12 March 1945. In the fifth German attack, Papin's unit ran out of ammunition and suffered heavy losses, the German tanks broke through. Papin rallied the unit and threw grenades at the tanks. When a German tank moved towards him, he threw himself under the tracks with an antitank grenade and was killed.

Papin was buried near Székesfehérvár. On 29 June 1945, Papin was posthumously awarded the title Hero of the Soviet Union. In addition, Secondary School No. 45 in Lipetsk was named for Papin, and a street in Lipetsk was named for him in 1965.
