= Oleg Kokushkin =

Soviet lieutenant colonel (1910–1943)

Oleg Ioilevich Kokushkin
- Олег Иоильевич Кокушкин
- Born: 8 May 1910; Plyos, Ivanovo Oblast, Russian Empire
- Died: 14 September 1943 (aged 33) near Bakhmach, Ukrainian SSR
- Military career
- Branch: Airborne
- Service years: 1931–1943
- Rank: Lieutenant colonel
- Unit: 3rd Guards Airborne Division
- Conflicts: World War II; Battle of Kiev; Battle of Moscow; Second Battle of Kharkov; Battle of Stalingrad; Battle of Demyansk; Battle of Kursk; Operation Kutuzov; Chernigov-Pripyat Offensive
- Awards: Hero of the Soviet Union; Order of Lenin; Order of the Red Banner (2); Order of the Patriotic War, 2nd class

Oleg Ioilevich Kokushkin (Russian: Олег Иоильевич Кокушкин; 8 May 1910 – 14 September 1943) was a Red Army lieutenant colonel and posthumous Hero of the Soviet Union. Kokushkin joined the Red Army in 1931 and became a political commissar. Kokushkin fought in the Battle of Kiev (1941), the Battle of Moscow, and the Battle of Stalingrad. In November 1942 he was sent to the "Vystrel" courses and after completing the course became commander of the 3rd Guards Airborne Division's 8th Guards Airborne Regiment. Kokushkin led the regiment in the Battle of Kursk, Operation Kutuzov and the Chernigov-Pripyat Offensive. He was killed in action when a German bomb struck his command post. Kokushkin was posthumously awarded the title Hero of the Soviet Union for his leadership of the regiment.

== Early life ==
Kokushkin was born on 8 May 1910 in Plyos. His father was an accountant for a textile factory. In 1912, his family moved to the village of Zakharovo. From 1917, he lived in Buy, where his father worked at the station. At Buy Kokushkin graduated from seven classes. 1929, he became a foreman working on the construction of the Stalingrad tractor factory. He joined the Communist Party in 1931 and the Red Army the same year.

He graduated from the Junior Aviation Specialists School in Tashkent. In 1934 he graduated from the Volsk Military Aviation Technical School and was the secretary of the party organization and then an instructor of the political department. In October 1940 he graduated from the commissar courses in Smolensk.

== World War II ==
In June 1941, Kokushkin was a Political commissar. In the Battle of Kiev, Kokushkin was the commissar of a battalion in the 212th Airborne Brigade of the 3rd Airborne Corps. During the fighting near Zhuliany, he reportedly organized the party political staff and repeatedly led the battalion in the attack. After the battalion commander was wounded Kokushkin reportedly took command himself. For these actions, Kokushkin was awarded the Order of the Red Banner twice, on 5 November and 13 December 1941. He was wounded and fought in the Battle of Moscow with a unit part of the Western Front. Kokushkin was again wounded and fought in the Second Battle of Kharkov.

He was the commissar of the 42nd Guards Rifle Regiment's 3rd Battalion, part of the 13th Guards Rifle Division, during the Battle of Stalingrad. On 31 January 1943, he was recommended for the Order of the Red Star after leading the battalion's counterattacks on 22 September which reportedly destroyed 12 tanks, but Vasily Chuikov instead awarded a Medal "For Courage" on 11 April 1943. From November 1942, Kokushkin attended the "Vystrel" course and afterward was assigned to the 3rd Guards Airborne Division.

On 3 July 1943, he became the commander of the 8th Guards Airborne Regiment of that division. Kokushkin fought in the Battle of Kursk a few days later. Kokushkin reportedly led the regiment in repulsing German attacks and in the offensive the regiment captured Buzuluk, Maslovo, Krasnaya Gorka, Mal. Bobriki, and Kamenka in a 24-kilometer advance. He was awarded the Order of the Patriotic War, 2nd class for his actions.

In the ensuing Central Front offensive, the 8th Guards Airborne Regiment helped capture areas of Kursk, Sumy and Chernihiv oblasts. The regiment reportedly killed 6,000 German soldiers and destroyed a large number of German weapons and equipment. By the evening of 7 September, the regiment was near Bakhmach. The Germans launched several counter-attacks, stopping the offensive temporarily. Kokushkin reportedly changed plan and moved to the regiment to the west of Bakhmach, cutting the Bakhmach-Nizhyn Railroad, leading to the retreat of the German forces to avoid being encircled. On 14 September 1943, a German bomb scored a direct hit on the regimental command post near the village of Haivoron, killing the divisional chief of staff, Alexei Arapov, and Kokushkin. On 17 October he was posthumously awarded the title Hero of the Soviet Union and the Order of Lenin. Kokushkin was buried in a mass grave at Haivoron.

Kokushkin's name is engraved on the World War II memorial in Ivanovo. There is also a memorial plaque at the Volsk Military Aviation Technical School.
