= Yevgeni Korolyov =

Yevgeni Korolyov may refer to:

- Evgeni Koroliov (born 1949), Russian pianist
- Evgeny Korolev (born 1988), Kazakhstani tennis player
- Evgeny Korolev (ice hockey) (born 1978), Russian ice hockey player

== See also ==
- Korolyov (disambiguation)
