= Lev Korolyov =

Lev Korolyov is the name of:

- Lev Nikolayevich Korolyov (1926–2016), Russian computer scientist
- Lev Vladimirovich Korolyov (born 1986), Russian footballer

== See also ==
- Korolyov (disambiguation)
