= Alexei Arapov =

Soviet soldier killed in WWII (1906–1943)

Alexei Nazarovich Arapov
- Алексей Назарович Арапов
- Born: 14 March 1906; Verkh-Neyvinsky, Yekaterinburgsky Uyezd, Perm Governorate
- Died: 14 September 1943 (aged 37) near Haivoron, Bakhmach Raion, Chernigov Oblast
- Military career
- Allegiance: Soviet Union
- Branch: Airborne
- Service years: 1928–1943
- Rank: Lieutenant colonel
- Unit: 3rd Guards Airborne Division
- Conflicts: World War II †
- Awards: Hero of the Soviet Union; Order of Lenin; Order of the Red Banner; Order of the Patriotic War, 2nd class

Alexei Nazarovich Arapov (14 March 1906 – 14 September 1943) was a Soviet officer, chief of staff of the 3rd Guards Airborne Division, and a Hero of the Soviet Union. Arapov was awarded the title posthumously for his leadership during the Battle of the Dnieper.

Drafted into the Red Army in 1928, Arapov became an officer and graduated from the Frunze Military Academy soon after the beginning of the German invasion of the Soviet Union on 22 June 1941. Serving as a staff officer in the 50th Army during the Battle of Moscow, Arapov distinguished himself and when the 8th Airborne Corps was formed in the fall of 1942, he became its chief of staff. The corps was soon converted into the 3rd Guards Airborne Division, and Arapov stayed on as chief of staff for the new division. Killed in a German air raid during the Battle of the Dnieper, he was posthumously awarded the title Hero of the Soviet Union for his actions.

== Early life ==
Alexei Arapov was born on 14 March 1906 in Verkh-Neyvinsky in the Yekaterinburgsky Uyezd of the Perm Governorate of the Russian Empire in the family of a miner and graduated from eighth grade. In 1922 he began working as a peat miner, and then became an apprentice turner at the Verkh-Neyvinsky ironworks. In 1924 he became a turner at the emerald mines of the trust "Russkiye samotsvety" (Russian Gems) near the station of Bazhenovo. In October Arapov moved to Sverdlovsk (now Yekaterinburg), where he successively worked as a laborer, a stonecutter, and a clerk in the trust "Uralkhleboprodukt" (Ural Bakeries). In February 1927, he moved to the Donbas, where he worked in a coal mine of the trust "Donugol" as a technical secretary, messenger, and coal cutter operator.

== Interwar military service ==
Arapov was drafted into the Red Army in November 1928. Initially serving with the 13th Corps Sapper Battalion at Kazan, he entered the Vladikavkaz (Ordzhonikidze from 1931) Infantry School in November 1929. While at the school, Arapov participated in the crushing of a Chechen uprising against collectivization in 1930 and in the same year became a member of the Communist Party. Arapov graduated from the Ordzhonikidze Infantry School in 1931 and became a machine gun platoon commander in the 9th Don Rifle Division's 25th Rifle Regiment at Novocherkassk. In 1932, he married Nadezhda Ignateyevna Lukovoy.

In 1932 he was transferred to the Far East to become an assistant machine gun company commander in the 99th Separate Machine Gun Battalion of the Blagoveshchensk Fortified Area, part of the Special Red Banner Far Eastern Army. In 1934, Arapov became assistant chief of staff of the 77th Separate Machine Gun Battalion of the Grodekovo Fortified Area. He subsequently served as battalion chief of staff and then as commander of its training company.

In October 1938, Arapov was transferred west to the Orel Military District, where he became a company commander in Belgorod and Alexeyevka. During the Great Purge, he was nearly repressed. According to his autobiography, during a political lecture, he stated that he had heard that Trotsky was a "world orator." For this, Arapov was expelled from the party, but his appeal for reinstatement succeeded. In June 1940, he entered the Frunze Military Academy.

== World War II ==
Arapov graduated from the academy in October 1941, after the German invasion of the Soviet Union, and became assistant chief of the 1st section of the Operations Department of the 50th Army, part of the Bryansk Front and from November part of the Western Front. He participated in the Battle of Moscow and the defense of Tula and Plavsk. In the defenses of the two cities, Arapov was reported by his superiors to have "skillfully coordinated the operations of the combat units." During the battle for Tula, as the representative of the army staff, Arapov "skillfully combined his personal courage with the ability to manage the troops, ensuing the fulfillment of orders." During the Vyazma airborne operation in January and February 1942, Arapov made dozens of flights to troops of the 4th Airborne Corps, dropped in the rear of German Army Group Centre, to coordinate their operations with those of the 50th Army. For his actions, Arapov was promoted to major on 22 January and awarded the Order of the Red Banner on 31 January.

During the summer of 1942, when the German advance approached his family's home in Alexeyevka, Nadezhda and the couple's two children became refugees and eventually made their way to Buy, Kostroma Oblast, where her parents lived. In the fall of 1942, the formation of new airborne corps was begun in Moscow Oblast. Arapov became the chief of staff of the 8th Airborne Corps, but on 8 December the corps was converted into the 3rd Guards Airborne Division, and he became chief of staff of the division. On 25 December Arapov was promoted to lieutenant colonel. In February 1943, after completing its training, the division was transferred to the Northwestern Front to fight in the Battle of Demyansk, an attempt to destroy a German salient. From 25 February to 12 March the division attacked heavily fortified German positions, but was unsuccessful due to weak artillery support. After losing two-thirds of its personnel, the division was withdrawn to the rear for reinforcement. However, the situation in the Kursk Bulge necessitated the speedy dispatch of the division there, and while still rebuilding it was transferred to the 53rd Army of the Steppe Front in April and May.

As the chief of staff of the 3rd Guards Airborne Division, Arapov fought in the Battle of Kursk and the subsequent pursuit from Maloarkhangelsk to the Desna River. On 14 September 1943, Arapov and 8th Guards Airborne Regiment commander Oleg Kokushkin were killed during a German air raid when a bomb scored a direct hit on the regiment's command post near Haivoron. He was posthumously awarded the Hero of the Soviet Union on 27 October 1943 and promoted to colonel.

A school in Verkh-Neyvinsky is named after Arapov.
