= Koroloff =

Koroloff is a Slavic surname, a transcription of Bulgarian: Королов. Notable people with the surname include:

- Lazar Koroloff (1902 or 1905–2002) Canadian Bulgarian emigration activist
- Larry Koroloff, Bulgarian-Canadian linguist and educator
- Mary Catherine Koroloff, birth name of M. K. Hobson (born 1969), American speculative fiction and fantasy writer
