= Arapov's contracture =

Clinical sign in appendicitis

Arapov's sign (contracture) is a pain reflex contraction of the right hip joint in appendicitis.
