= Mokrous =

Mokrous Мокроус
- Work settlement
- Interactive map of Mokrous
- Location of Mokrous Mokrous (Saratov Oblast)
- Coordinates: 51°14′18″N 47°30′38″E
- Country: Russia
- Federal subject: Saratov Oblast
- Administrative district: Fyodorovsky District
- Founded: 1894

Population (2010 Census)
  - Total: 6,731
  - Estimate (2021): 5,860 (−12.9%)

Administrative status
  - Capital of: Fyodorovsky District
- Time zone: UTC+4 (MSK+1)
- Postal code: 413410
- OKTMO ID: 63648151051

Mokrous (Russian: Мокроус) is an urban locality (a work settlement) and the administrative center of Fyodorovsky District of Saratov Oblast, Russia. Population: 6,731 (2010 census); 6,788 (2002 census); 6,559 (1989 Soviet census).
