= Nikolay Korolyov (sergeant) =

Hero of the Soviet Union

Nikolay Stepanovich Korolyov
- Николай Степанович Королёв
- Born: 22 May 1921; Katyshevo village, Muromsky District, Vladimir Oblast, Russian SFSR, Soviet Union
- Died: 27 November 1943 (aged 22); Radomyshl Raion, Zhitomir Oblast, Ukrainian SSR, Soviet Union
- Military career
- Allegiance: Soviet Union
- Branch: Airborne
- Service years: 1939–1943
- Rank: Starshina (Sergeant Major)
- Unit: 3rd Guards Airborne Division
- Conflicts: World War II; Battle of the Dnieper †
- Awards: Hero of the Soviet Union

Nikolay Stepanovich Korolyov (Russian: Николай Степанович Королёв; 22 May 1921 – 27 November 1943) was a Red Army sergeant and a Hero of the Soviet Union. Korolev was posthumously awarded the title for his actions during the Battle of the Dnieper, where he repulsed numerous counterattacks with his machine gun. He was killed in action more than a month after the battle.

== Early life ==
Korolev was born on 22 May 1921 in Katyshevo village, Muromsky District, Vladimir Oblast. He graduated from eighth grade and worked on the collective farm. Korolev went to the Muromsky Teacher Training College and worked as a teacher in the Aktobe Region of the Kazakh Soviet Socialist Republic. In 1939, Korolev was drafted into the Red Army.

== World War II ==
He fought with the Southwestern Front, Central Front, Voronezh Front and 1st Ukrainian Front and was wounded twice. In 1942, he joined the Communist Party of the Soviet Union. By October 1943, he was a Starshina, or sergeant major, in the 3rd Battalion of the 8th Guards Airborne Regiment of the 3rd Guards Airborne Division. During the Battle of the Dnieper on 2 October 1943, Korolev crossed the Dnieper north of Kyiv near the village of Suholuchya with his regiment, which captured a bridgehead on the right bank. On 5 October, he reportedly repulsed three German counterattacks with his machine gun after German counterattacks increased pressure on the battalion's left flank. On 6 October he repulsed another counterattack, reportedly inflicting heavy losses on German troops. Korolev was killed on 27 November 1943 during the capture of a village in Radomyshl Raion.

He was posthumously awarded the title Hero of the Soviet Union and the Order of Lenin on 10 January 1944.
