= Pavel Rybalko =

Soviet military commander (1894–1948)

Pavel Semyonovich Rybalko
- Павел Семёнович Рыбалко
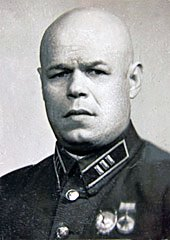
- Rybalko in 1938
- Born: 4 November [O.S. 23 October] 1894; Kharkov Governorate, Russian Empire (present-day Ukraine)
- Died: 28 August 1948 (aged 53); Moscow, Russian SFSR, Soviet Union
- Military career
- Allegiance: Soviet Union
- Service years: 1914–1948
- Rank: Marshal of the armored troops
- Commands: 3rd Tank Army; 57th Army; 3rd Guards Tank Army
- Conflicts: World War I; Russian Civil War; Polish–Soviet War; World War II; Lvov–Sandomierz Offensive; Vistula–Oder Offensive; Upper Silesian Offensive; Battle of Berlin; Prague Offensive
- Awards: Hero of the Soviet Union (2)
- Other work: Commander of Armoured Forces of the Red Army

Pavel Semyonovich Rybalko (Russian: Павел Семёнович Рыбалко, Ukrainian: Павло Семенович Рибалко, romanized: Pavlo Semenovych Rybalko; 23 October 1894 – 28 August 1948) was a commander of armoured troops in the Red Army during and following World War II.

== Early life and career ==
Pavel Semyonovich Rybalko was born in the Kharkov Governorate of the Russian Empire (now in Ukraine) in the family of a factory worker. He joined the Russian Imperial Army in 1914 and fought as a private during World War I. After the October Revolution, he entered the Red Guard in late 1917 and formally joined the Red Army in early 1919, serving as a regimental and brigade commissar during the Russian Civil War. He also fought as a cavalry commander in the Polish–Soviet War of 1920.

Following these conflicts, Rybalko pursued advanced military education, graduating from the M. V. Frunze Military Academy in Moscow between 1931 and 1934. In the mid-1930s, he served in the Far East before returning to Moscow to work in the Tank Directorate. He later held diplomatic assignments abroad as a military attaché, including postings in Poland and China, while continuing to develop expertise in armored warfare.

During that period, he studied intensively the principles of modern armored warfare, as developed by the western theorists (Generals von Kleist, Guderian and Fuller), as well as the doctrine of "deep operations," as theorized by Triandafillov and Tukhachevsky. His next assignments were as military attaché in Poland, where he was the last military attaché and left a few days before the Soviet invasion, and in China. He then took a post of lecturer in tactics at the Kazan tank school.

== World War II ==
Very surprisingly and to his extreme frustration, Rybalko spent the first year of the war as a lecturer in Kazan. He finally got an operational assignment in May 1942, as deputy commander of the 3rd Tank Army of the Reserve of the Supreme High Command. Throughout the war, Rybalko's name was closely associated with the 3rd Tank Army. In the winter of 1942–1943, included in the Voronezh Front, his army spearheaded the different operations that tried to exploit and transform the Germans' defeat in Stalingrad into a large-scale strategic victory in the southern theater of operations. That included Operation Star in February, which was aimed at the liberation of Kharkov, one of the first major Soviet cities to be reconquered by the Red Army. However, Erich von Manstein's counteroffensive recaptured the city and inflicted serious damages to the exhausted and overextended 3rd Tank Army.

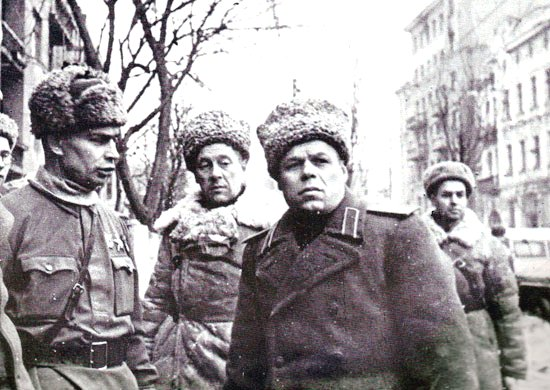
Commander of the 3rd Tank Army, Pavel Rybalko among the tank soldiers, Spring 1943

Refitted and renamed the 3rd Guards Tank Army, Rybalko's army played crucial roles in the strategic counteroffensives that followed the Battle of Kursk (Operation Kutuzov), in the recapture of Kiev (6 November 1943). The winter and the spring of 1944 saw a succession of large operations, aiming at the destruction of the southern wing of the Wehrmacht. Operations (Zhitomir-Berdichev in December 1943 to January 1944 and Proskurov-Chernivtsi in March to April 1944) succeeded at least in the complete liberation of Ukraine by the end of the summer. During the various operations, Rybalko showed impressive tactical and operational skills, particularly during the Lvov-Sandomierz Operation.

Still in command of his 3rd Guards Tank Army, Rybalko took a major place in the various operations that were launched in North Ukraine: Galicia (summer 1944) and Silesia (late 1944 and winter 1945). Finally, as part of Ivan Konev's 1st Ukrainian Front, Rybalko's army was one of the four Guards Tank armies engaged in the giant Battle for Berlin.

Immediately after the capture of Berlin, Rybalko and his tank army were tasked with the assault on the city in the Prague offensive and on 9 May liberated Prague.

== Postwar ==
After the war, he became commander of the mechanized forces of the Red Army.

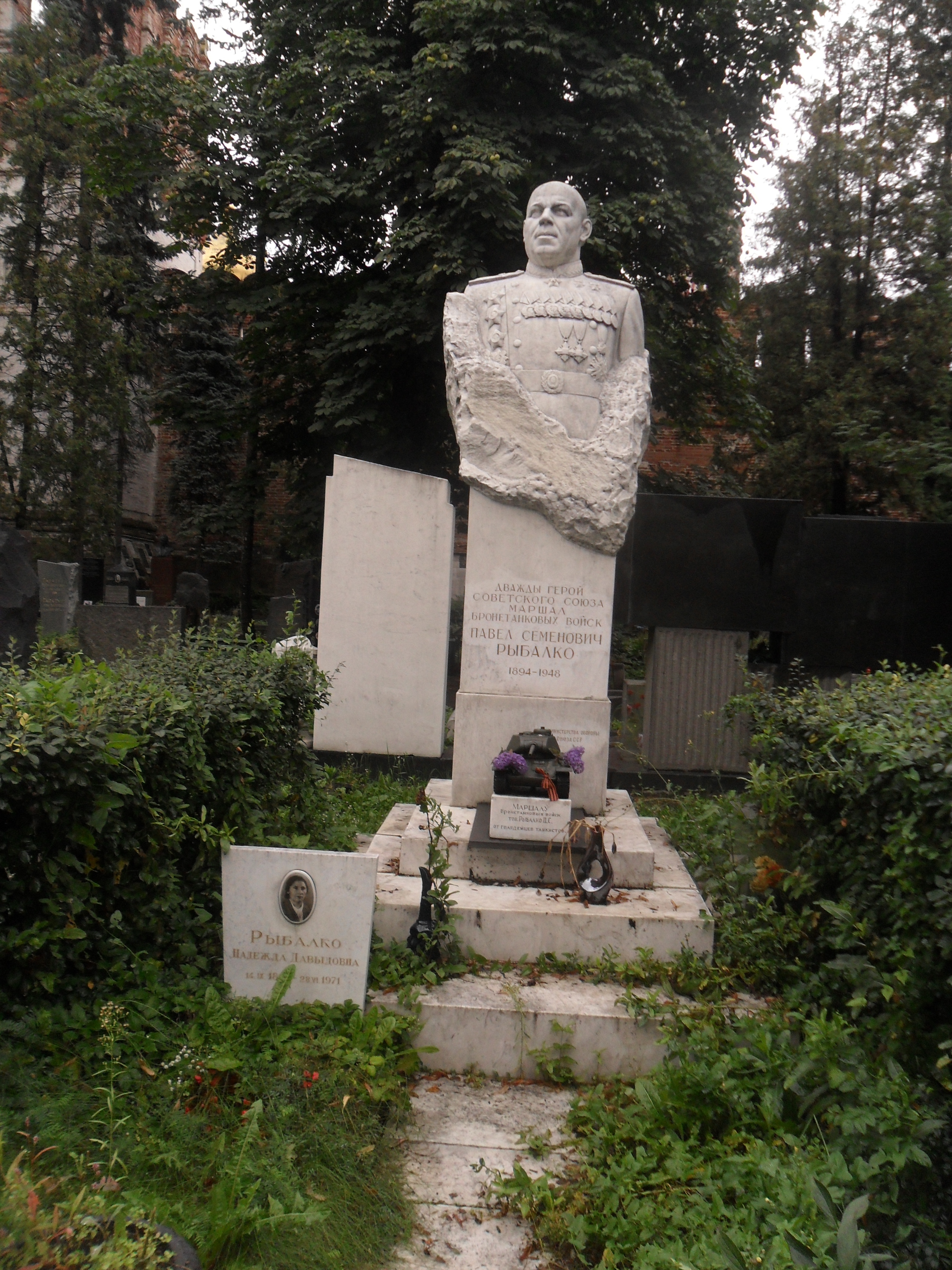
Grave of Pavel Rybalko at the Novodevichy Cemetery

He emerged as one of the most highly regarded Soviet tank commanders. He fully understood the nature of armored warfare and mastered the operational aspects of armored armies command.

He died in 1948 of kidney disease and was buried in Novodevichy Cemetery.

== Legacy ==
The Tashkent Higher Tank Command School is named after him.

== Awards and decorations ==
=== Soviet Union ===
Hero of the Soviet Union, twice (17 November 1943, 6 April 1945)
Order of Lenin, twice (17 November 1943, 21 February 1945)
Order of the Red Banner, thrice (1921, 3 November 1944, 1948)
Order of Suvorov, 1st class, thrice (28 January 1943, 25 August 1944, 29 May 1945)
Order of Kutuzov, 1st class (27 August 1943)
Order of Bogdan Khmelnitsky, 1st class (29 May 1944)
Medal "For the Defence of Moscow" (1 May 1944)
Medal "For the Defence of Stalingrad" (22 December 1942)
Medal "For the Liberation of Prague" (9 June 1945)
Medal "For the Capture of Berlin" (9 June 1945)
Medal "For the Victory over Germany in the Great Patriotic War 1941–1945" (1945)
Jubilee Medal "XX Years of the Workers' and Peasants' Red Army" (24 January 1938)
Jubilee Medal "30 Years of the Soviet Army and Navy" (22 February 1948)
Medal "In Commemoration of the 800th Anniversary of Moscow" (20 September 1947)

=== Foreign ===
Grand Cross of the Order of the White Lion (Czechoslovakia)
Military Order of the White Lion "For Victory", 2nd class (Czechoslovakia)
War Cross 1939–1945, twice (Czechoslovakia)
Knight of the Virtuti Militari (Poland)
Order of the Cross of Grunwald, 3rd class (Poland)
Medal "For Oder, Neisse and the Baltic" (Poland)
Medal of Victory and Freedom 1945 (Poland)
