= Fyodorovsky District, Saratov Oblast =

Fyodorovsky District Фёдоровский район
- District
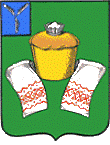
- Coat of arms
- Location of Fyodorovsky District in Saratov Oblast
- Coordinates: 51°14′19″N 47°30′39″E
- Country: Russia
- Federal subject: Saratov Oblast
- Established: 7 September 1941
- Administrative center: Mokrous

Area
  - Total: 2,500 km^{2} (970 sq mi)

Population (2010 Census)
  - Total: 20,876
  - Density: 8.4/km^{2} (22/sq mi)
  - Urban: 32.2%
  - Rural: 67.8%

Administrative structure
  - Inhabited localities: 1 urban-type settlements, 29 rural localities

Municipal structure
  - Municipally incorporated as: Fyodorovsky Municipal District
  - Municipal divisions: 1 urban settlements, 14 rural settlements
- Time zone: UTC+4 (MSK+1)
- OKTMO ID: 63648000
- Website: http://mokrous.fedrayon.ru/

Fyodorovsky District (Russian: Фёдоровский райо́н) is an administrative and municipal district (raion), one of the thirty-eight in Saratov Oblast, Russia. It is located in the center of the oblast. The area of the district is 2,500 square kilometers (970 sq mi). Its administrative center is the urban locality (a work settlement) of Mokrous. Population: 20,876 (2010 Census); 22,108 (2002 Census); 21,579 (1989 Soviet census). The population of Mokrous accounts for 32.2% of the district's total population.
