= Sergei Alexandrovich Korolev =

Russian microbiologist

Sergey Korolyov
- Сергей Королёв
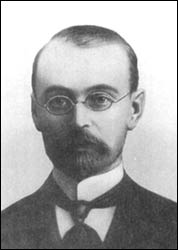
- Born: 1874; Moscow
- Died: 1932 (aged 57–58)

Sergei Alexandrovich Korolev (Russian: Сергей Александрович Королёв; 1874–1932) was a Russian microbiologist and professor and the founder of industrial microbiology. He was one of the founders of the Soviet dairy industry at the beginning of the 20th century. Through the work of Korolev, his colleagues and students, the microbiology of milk and dairy products was developed considerably.

== Early life ==
Korolev was born in Moscow in 1874. He graduated in 1900 from Kazan University, and stayed at the department of geography in preparation for the professoriate. In 1902, for participation in the revolutionary movement Sergey Korolev was sent to the Arkhangelsk province, but since 1907 received permission to live in Moscow, worked for agronomists bacteriological station.

== Career ==
At 1918, Sergei Alexandrovich Korolev worked at the Department of Microbiology and Zoology at the Vologda Milk Institute. In 1920, he was elected professor of microbiology. He was engaged in improving the quality of dairy products and increasing shelf life (v1922, 1926). In particular, he proved that the yeast were not the agents of rancidity of butter (as some researchers thought), but on the contrary, they are antagonists of the problem and that most species of yeast occurring in oil retains in its mold. Methods of application of special yeast culture to combat mold oil, widely spread in practice to improve the safety of all types of oil.

In 1923–24, S. Korolev, together with the professor G.S. Inihovym and students studied the microbiological and biochemical processes of maturation of a number of hard and soft cheese, produced in the USSR. The work enabled the first time to make a harmonious synthesis of a unified theory of ripening cheeses. Prior to that, this theory put forward a Swiss scientist Freydenreyh, based on studies of only Swiss cheese.

Sergei Korolev is the author of Technical Microbiology of Milk and Milk Products (1940), recognized as one of the best books in this branch of science. Also, he co-authored with G. Inihovym the textbook Chemistry and bacteriology of milk and dairy products (1923).

== See also ==
- Industrial microbiology
