= Nikolay Korolyov (boxer) =

Russian boxer

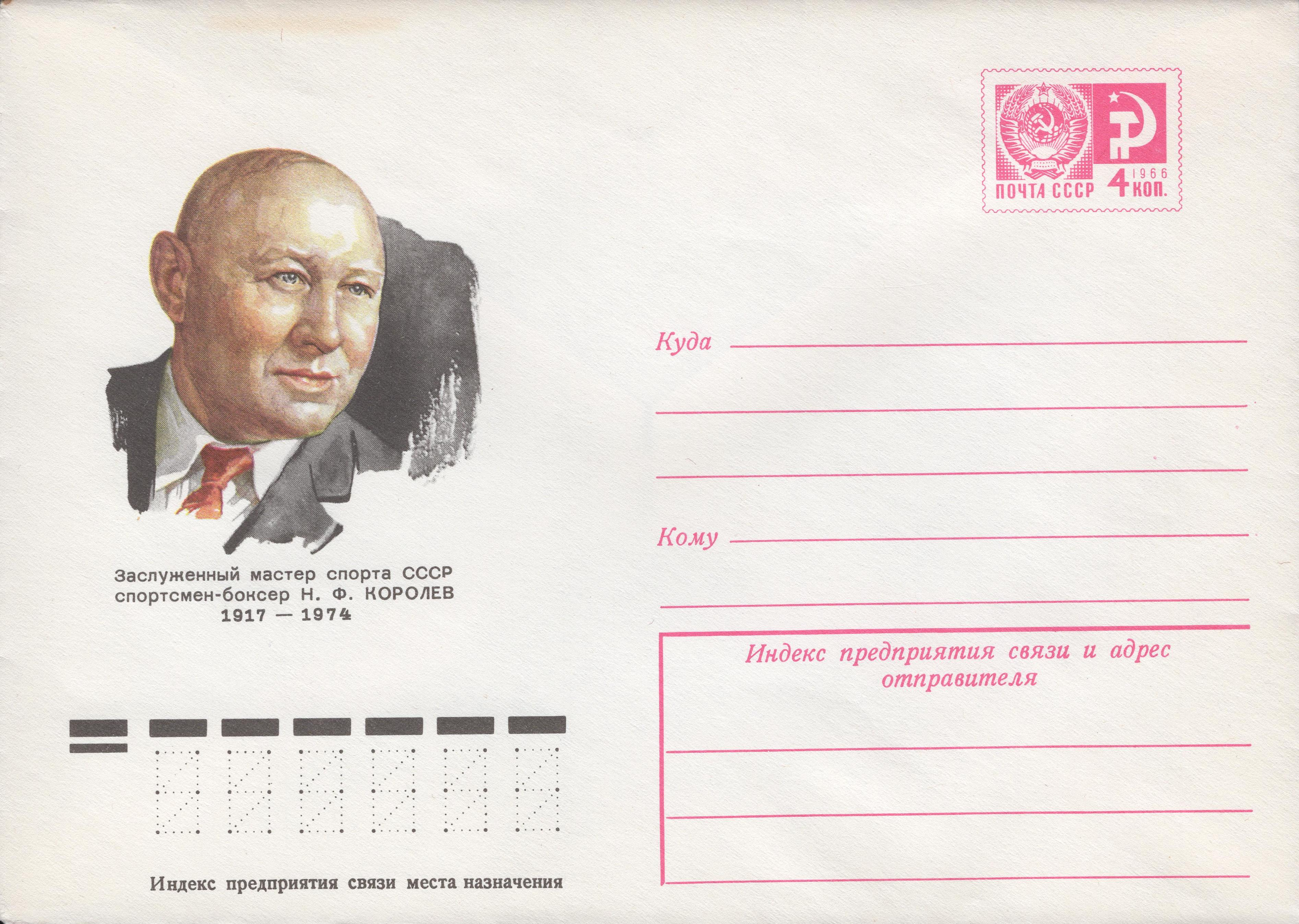
Korolyov on a 1977 Soviet stamp

Nikolay Fyodorovich Korolyov (Russian: Николай Фёдорович Королёв; 14 March 1917 – 12 March 1974) was a Soviet boxer and trainer. Korolyov was the nine time heavyweight champion of the USSR.

== Biography ==
Born in Moscow in 1917, Korolyov began working at the Neftegaz factory there after graduating from school.

He began his route towards major sporting success in 1933, under the leadership of Ivan Stepanovich Bogayev - one of the pioneers of Soviet boxing. Soon Korolyov entered the Stalin Technical School of Physical Culture and began to train, first under Konstantin Gradopolov and then under Arkady Georgievich Kharlampiyev, father of Anatoly Kharlampiyev.

On 22 October 1936, at the Moscow Circus on Tsvetnoy Boulevard, Korolyov first became the Absolute Champion of the USSR. Korolyov's opponent was the very strong and experienced Viktor Pavlovich Mikhailov. After six three-minute rounds, Korolyov became the foremost pugilist in the Soviet Union. In 1937 he triumphed at the Workers' Olympiad in Antwerp, knocking out two opponents in the first round.

Korolyov graduated as a trainer, receiving one of the first such diplomas in the Soviet Union.

In 1939 Korolyov was called up for military service. He became a student at a school for fighter pilots. However, because of a plane accident in which he received heavy injuries, Korolyov was forced to leave military service.

During World War II Korolyov served in the detachment of Hero of the Soviet Union Colonel Dmitry Medvedev. He twice carried an injured Medvedev from the battlefield. After the war Korolyov served in the Northern Fleet for more than a decade.

In 1944 Korolyov returned to the ring. In a difficult bout with Yevgeny Ogurenkov he regained the title of Absolute Champion of the Soviet Union, and in 1945 repeated this achievement. In 1946 Korolyov won international tournaments in Helsinki and Prague.

Korolyov died on 12 March 1974, two days shy of his 57th birthday, and was buried in the Vvedenskoye Cemetery in Moscow.

== Sporting achievements ==
- Won 206 out of 219 matches, with 19 matches in international bouts
- 9 time heavyweight champion of the USSR (1936–1953)
- 4 time absolute champion of the USSR (1936–1937 and 1944–1945)
- Winner of the 1937 Workers' Olympiad in Antwerp
- Winner of international tournaments in Helsinki and Prague (1946)

== Awards ==
- Order of the Red Banner
- Order of the Red Banner of Labour
- Medal "To a Partisan of the Patriotic War", 1st class
- Merited Master of Sport of the USSR (1942)

== Memorials ==
- In Bryansk an International (formerly All-Union) boxing memorial tournament was created in the name of Korolyov. The first tournament was held in 1974, and after a hiatus from 1985 they resumed in 2002.
- In 1977 the Soviet Ministry of Communications issued an illustrated envelope to mark 60 years since the birth of Korolyov.
