= 3rd Guards Tank Army =

3rd Guards Tank Army 3rd Guards Mechanised Army (1946–1957) 18th Guards Army (1957–1964)
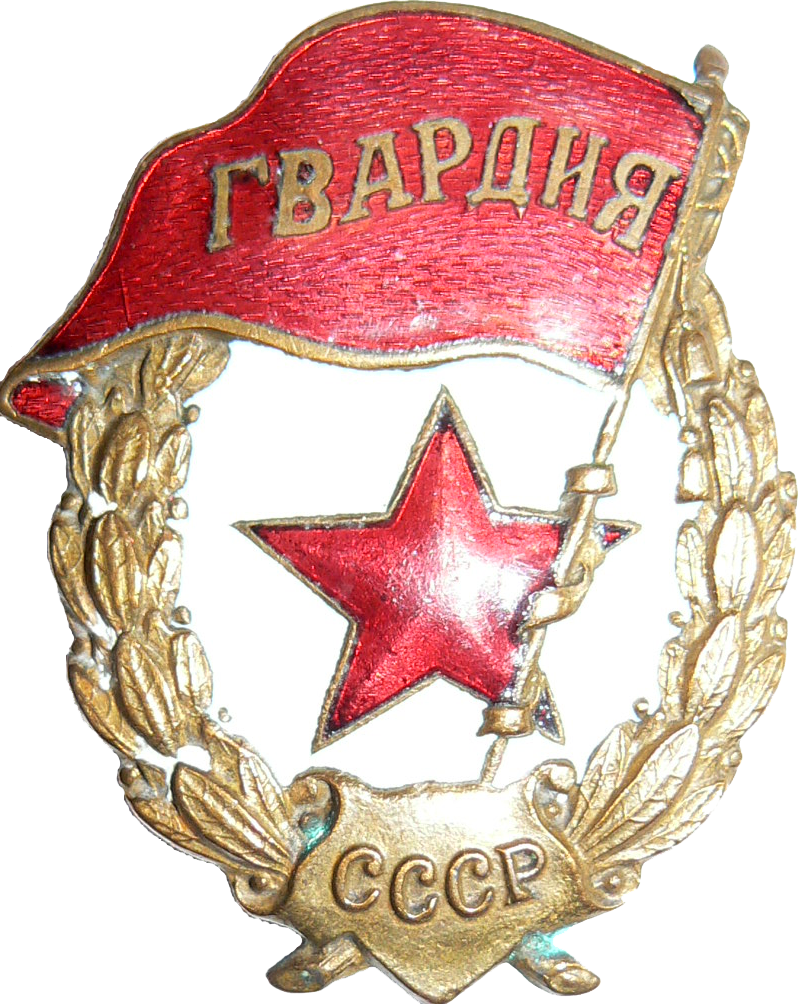
- Active: 1942–1969
- Country: Soviet Union
- Branch: Red Army
- Type: Armoured
- Role: Breakthrough and Exploitation in Deep Operations
- Size: 500–800 tanks
- Engagements: World War II: Lvov–Sandomierz Offensive; Battle of Berlin; Prague Operation

Commanders
- Notable commanders: General Colonel Pavel Rybalko

The 3rd Guards Tank Army (Russian: 3-я гвардейская танковая армия) was a tank army established by the Soviet Union's Red Army during World War II. The 3rd Tank Army was created in 1942 and fought in the southern areas of the Soviet Union and Poland, then in Germany and Czechoslovakia until the defeat of Germany in 1945. Postwar, the army served as occupation troops in East Germany, went through several name changes, and was finally deactivated in 1969.

== History ==
=== Second World War ===
==== First Formation ====
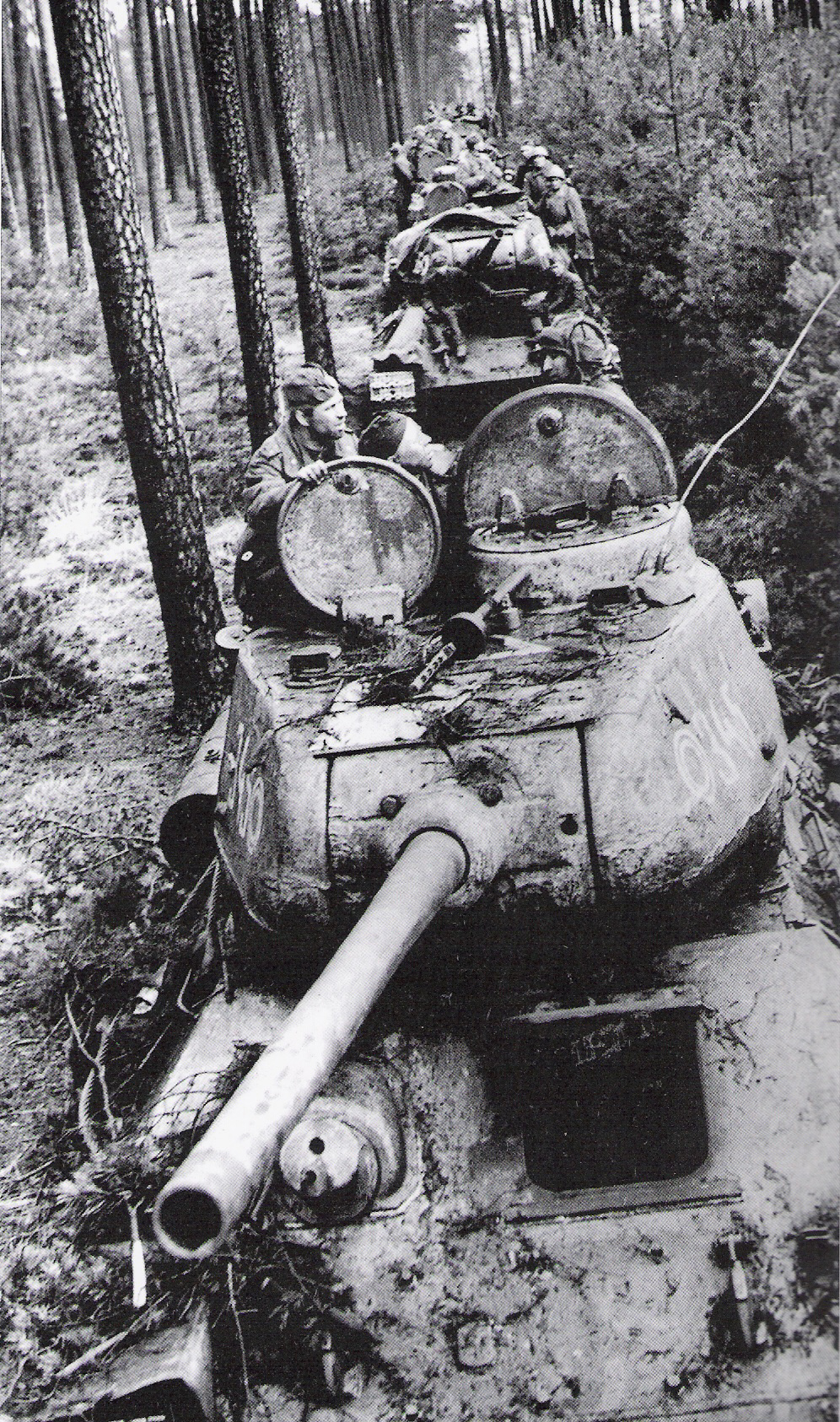
Tanks of the army in Germany, 1945

The 3rd Tank Army was formed as part of the Reserve of the Supreme High Command (RVGK, Stavka reserve) on the basis of the 58th Army in the Moscow Military District in May 1942. It was placed under the command of Lieutenant General Prokofy Romanenko. Its initial composition was 12th and 15th Tank Corps, one motor rifle division, and two rifle divisions. As part of the Soviet Western Front, the 3rd Tank Army successfully counter-attacked the German Second Panzer Army in August 1942. Soon afterwards, in September 1942, Romanenko handed over command to Colonel General Pavel Rybalko, who held command of the Army for the remainder of the war.

Committed to the fighting for Kharkov in March 1943 as part of the Voronezh Front, the 3rd Tank Army was subsequently encircled and virtually destroyed by German forces. The Army's remnants were reorganised as the 57th Army.

==== Second Formation ====
The army was reformed as the 3rd Guards Tank Army in May 1943, including the 9th Mechanised Corps & 12th & 15th Tank Corps. In 1943, the army took part in the Orel offensive and, assigned to the Voronezh and First Ukrainian Fronts, played a leading role in the liberation of Left Bank Ukraine. During the Orel offensive the 12th and 15th Tank Corps became the 6th and 7th Guards Tank Corps, respectively. The army was among the first Soviet troops to reach the Dnieper River in October 1943. In 1944, it fought in the Proskurov-Chernovits and Lvov-Sandomierz offensive operations. The army subsequently fought in southern Poland, Silesia, and in the Battle of Berlin. It overran the OKH command post at Zossen, headquarters for German Eastern Front operations, on April 21, 1945. Finally, the army drove on Prague, entering that city on May 9.

=== Cold War ===
Soon after the end of the war, the 6th and 7th Guards Tank Corps were converted into tank divisions with the same numbers, and the 9th Mechanized Corps into the 9th Mechanized Division. By 1946, the army had been re-designated as the 3rd Guards Mechanized Army and was headquartered in Luckenwalde, East Germany, as part of the Group of Soviet Forces in Germany. The 3rd Guards Mechanized Army was one of several Soviet armies used in the suppression of the 1953 uprising in East Germany, moving the 6th Guards Tank Division into Dessau and Wittenberg as well as the 9th Mechanized Division into Lübben, Cottbus, and Spremberg. On 29 April 1957, the 3rd Guards Mechanized Army became the 18th Guards Army. At the same time the 14th Guards Mechanized Division became the 14th Guards Motor Rifle Division. In 1958, the 82nd Motor Rifle Division, the former 9th Mechanized Corps, was withdrawn to Slavuta in the Carpathian Military District, where it disbanded. Up to 1964 it had preserved two formations which had served with it during World War II: the 6th and 7th Guards Tank Divisions (former similarly numbered Tank Corps).

In August 1964, the headquarters of the 18th Guards Army was relocated to Alma-Ata, where it became the operational group of the Turkestan Military District. The 6th and 7th Guards Tank Divisions and the 14th Guards Motor Rifle Division were transferred to other units within the GSFG. The operational group was converted back into the 18th Army (without the Guards designation) on 4 March 1969, but was used to activate the headquarters of the Central Asian Military District on 24 June.

== Commanders ==
The 3rd Tank Army was commanded by the following officers:

- Lieutenant General Prokofy Romanenko (25 May–24 September 1942)
- Major General (promoted to Lieutenant General 19 January 1943) Pavel Rybalko (25 September 1942 – 26 April 1943)

The 3rd Guards Tank Army, 3rd Guards Mechanized Army, and 18th Guards Army were commanded by the following officers:

- Lieutenant General (promoted to Colonel General 30 December 1943 and Marshal of Tank Troops 1 June 1945) Pavel Rybalko (14 May 1943–February 1947)
- Lieutenant General Vasily Mitrofanov (February 1947–May 1950)
- Lieutenant General Vasily Butkov (May 1950–30 September 1953)
- Lieutenant General (promoted to Colonel General 8 August 1955) Viktor Obukhov (30 September 1953 – 15 April 1958)
- Major General (promoted to Lieutenant General 25 May 1959) Sergey Sokolov (15 April 1958 – 21 January 1960)
- Major General (promoted to Lieutenant General 7 May 1960) Georgy Anishchik (22 January 1960 – 28 August 1964)

== Order of Battle ==
=== World War 2 ===
On February 1, 1943, on the eve of the Third Battle of Kharkov, the 3rd Tank Army comprised the following formations:

3rd Tank Army

- 12th Tank Corps (Major General of Tank Forces M.I. Zinkovich)
  - 30th Tank Brigade
  - 97th Tank Brigade
  - 106th Tank Brigade
  - 13th Motor Rifle Brigade
  - 6th Armored Car Battalion
- 15th Tank Corps (Major General of Tank Forces Vasily Koptsov)
  - 88th Tank Brigade
  - 113th Tank Brigade
  - 195th Tank Brigade
  - 52nd Motor Rifle Brigade
  - 5th Armored Car Battalion
- 48th Rifle Division
- 62nd Guards Rifle Division
- 111th Rifle Division
- 160th Rifle Division
- 184th Rifle Division
- 179th Tank Brigade
- 39th Armored Car Battalion
- 37th Rifle Brigade
- 8th Artillery Division
  - 2nd Light Artillery Brigade
  - 12th Gun Artillery Brigade
  - 28th Howitzer Artillery Brigade
- 1172nd Tank Destroyer Brigade
- 1245th Tank Destroyer Brigade
- 15th Guards Mortar Brigade*
- 62nd Guards Mortar Regiment*
- 97th Guards Mortar Regiment*
- 315th Guards Mortar Regiment*
- 71st Anti-Aircraft Artillery Regiment
- 470th Anti-Aircraft Artillery Regiment
- 391st Anti-Aircraft Artillery Regiment

* Guards Mortar Regiment (or Battalion) (Russian: гвардейский минометный полк (дивизион)) was the overt designation used for Katyusha rocket launcher units.

Following the 3rd Tank Army's destruction, it was reconstructed as the 3rd Guards Tank Army, and by December 31, 1943, it was organized as follows:

3rd Guards Tank Army

- 6th Guards Tank Corps (Major General of Tank Forces A. P. Panfilov)
  - 51st Tank Brigade
  - 52nd Tank Brigade
  - 53rd Guards Tank Brigade
  - 22nd Guards Motor Rifle Brigade
  - 1442nd Self Propelled Gun Regiment
  - 1893rd Self Propelled Gun Regiment
  - 3rd Guards Motorcycle Battalion
  - 55th Guards Tank Destroyer Battalion
  - 272nd Guards Mortar Regiment
  - 286th Guards Anti-Aircraft Artillery Regiment
- 7th Guards Tank Corps (Major General of Tank Forces S. A. Ivanov)
  - 54th Tank Brigade
  - 55th Tank Brigade
  - 56th Guards Tank Brigade
  - 23rd Guards Motor Rifle Brigade
  - 1419th Self Propelled Gun Regiment
  - 1894th Self Propelled Gun Regiment
  - 4th Guards Motorcycle Battalion
  - 56th Guards Tank Destroyer Regiment
  - 467th Guards Mortar Regiment
  - 287th Guards Anti-Aircraft Artillery Regiment
- 9th Mechanized Corps (Major General of Tank Forces K.A. Malygin)
  - 69th Mechanized Brigade
  - 70th Mechanized Brigade
  - 71st Mechanized Brigade
  - 47th Tank Regiment
  - 59th Guards Tank Regiment
  - 1454th Self Propelled Gun Regiment
  - 1823rd Self Propelled Gun Regiment
  - 100th Motorcycle Battalion
  - 396th Tank Destroyer Regiment
  - 616th Mortar Regiment
  - 1719th Anti-Aircraft Artillery Regiment
- 91st Tank Brigade
- 166th Tank Regiment
- 1835th Self-Propelled Gun Regiment
- 1836th Self-Propelled Gun Regiment
- 50th Motorcycle Regiment
- 39th Armored Car Battalion
- 36th Guards Mortar Regiment*
- 91st Guards Mortar Regiment*
- 1381st Anti-Aircraft Artillery Regiment
- 1394th Anti-Aircraft Artillery Regiment
- 182nd Engineering Battalion

* Guards Mortar Regiment (or Battalion) (Russian: гвардейский минометный полк (дивизион)) was the overt designation used for Katyusha rocket launcher units.
