= Battle of Kiev (1943) =

Battle during World War II

Coordinates: 50.40°N 30.54°E

Second Battle of Kiev
- Part of the Battle of the Dnieper of the Eastern Front of World War II
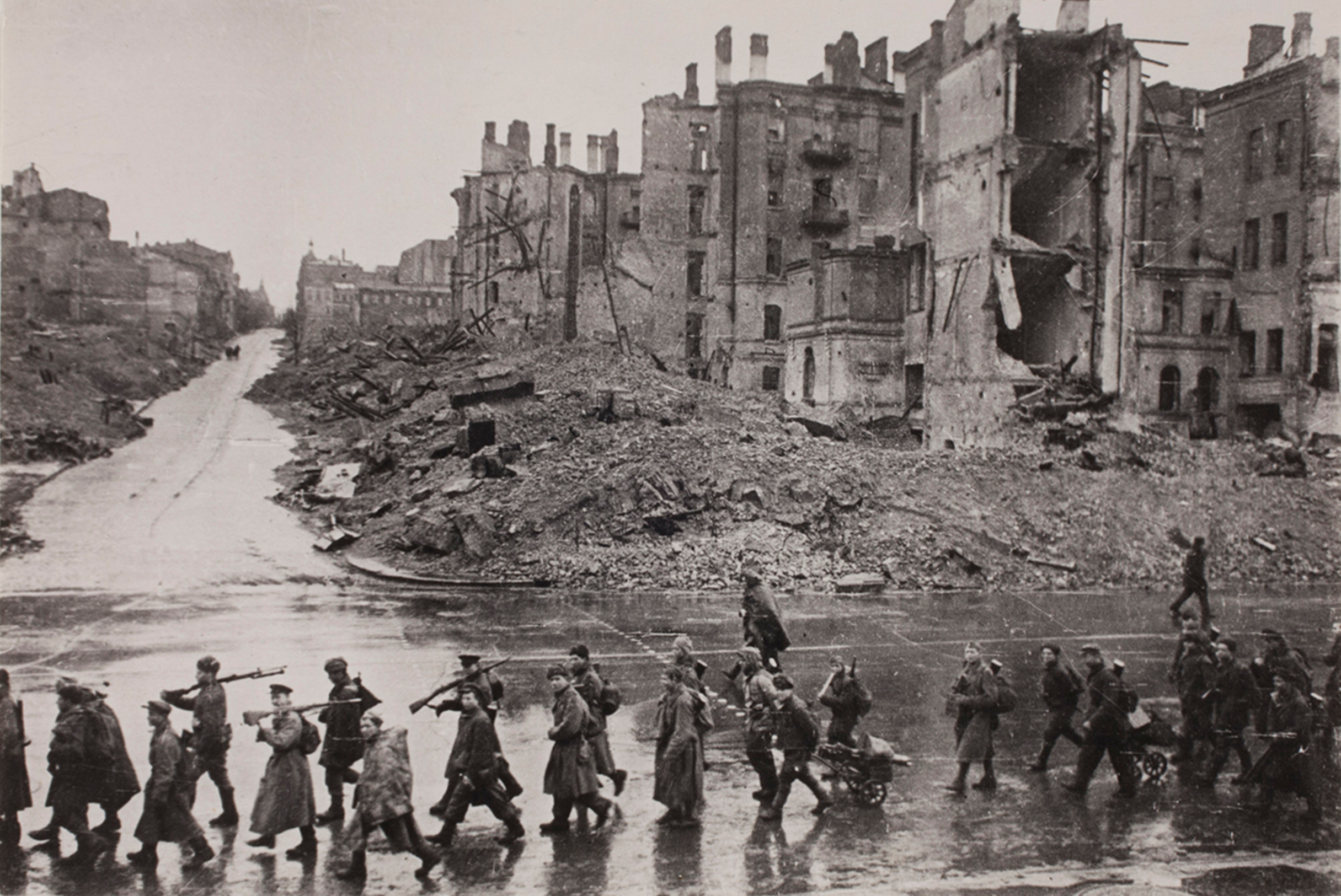
- Kiev after its liberation in November 1943.
Date	3–13 November 1943 (Offensive Operation); 13 November – 22 December 1943 (Defensive Operation)
Location	Kiev, Ukrainian SSR, Soviet Union
Result	Soviet victory
Territorial changes	Red Army breaks out of Dnieper bridgehead; Axis forces expelled from Kiev

Belligerents
Soviet Union; Czechoslovakia	Germany

Commanders and leaders
Nikolai Vatutin; Pavel Rybalko; Andrei Grechko	Hermann Hoth; Erhard Raus

Units involved
1st Ukrainian Front	4th Panzer Army

Strength
730,000 men 7,000 guns and mortars 675 tanks and assault guns 700 combat aircraft	On 1 November 1943: 276,978 men in total

Casualties and losses
118,042 men: 28,141 killed, missing or captured; 89,901 wounded or sick; 271 tanks (3–13 November); 125 aircraft (3–13 November)	16,992 men: 2,628 killed; 13,083 wounded; 1,281 missing

The Second Battle of Kiev, known on the German side as the Defensive battle in the Kiev-Zhitomir area (German: Abwehrschlacht im Raum Kiew-Shitomir), was a part of a much wider Soviet offensive in Ukraine known as the Battle of the Dnieper involving three strategic operations by the Soviet Red Army and its Czechoslovak units and one operational counterattack by the Wehrmacht, which took place between 4 November and 22 December 1943.

Following the Battle of Kursk, the Red Army launched the Belgorod-Kharkov Offensive Operation, pushing Army Group South (Erich von Manstein) back towards the Dnieper River. Stavka, the Soviet high command, ordered the Central Front and the Voronezh Front to force crossings of the Dnieper. When the attempt to cross the Dnieper failed in October, the effort was handed to the 1st Ukrainian Front (Nikolai Vatutin) with some support from the 2nd Ukrainian Front. The 1st Ukrainian Front was able to secure bridgeheads north and south of Kiev.

== Strategy ==
The structure of the strategic operations from the Soviet planning point of view was:

- Kiev Strategic Offensive Operation (October) (1–24 October 1943) by the Central and Voronezh Fronts
  - Chernobyl-Radomysl Offensive Operation (1–4 October 1943)
  - Chernobyl-Gornostaipol Defensive Operation (3–8 October 1943)
  - Lyutezh Offensive Operation (11–24 October 1943)
  - Bukrin Offensive Operation (12–15 October 1943)
  - Bukrin Offensive Operation (21–24 October 1943)
- Kiev Strategic Offensive Operation (November) (3–13 November 1943)
  - Rauss' November 1943 counterattack
- Kiev Strategic Defensive Operation (1943) (13 November 1943 – 22 December 1943)

== Soviet preparations ==
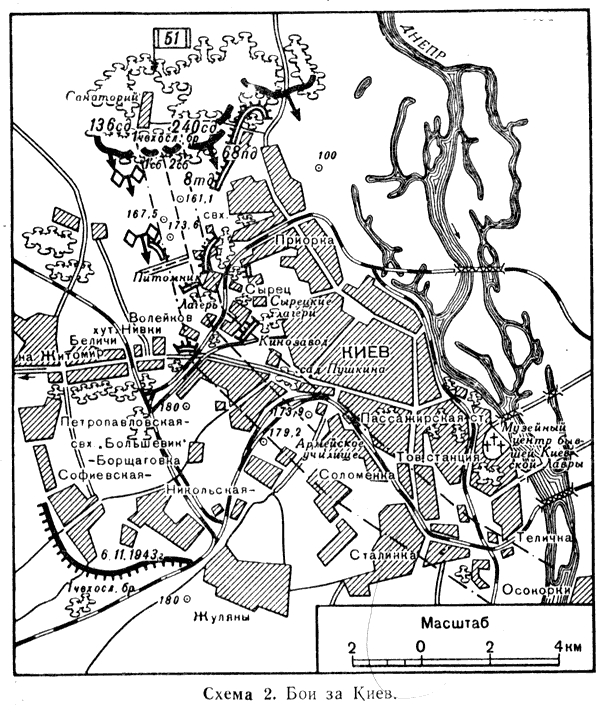
Soviet map of Kiev (1943)

In October 1943, several of Vatutin's armies were having serious trouble trying to break out of the rugged terrain of the Bukrin bend, the southern bridgehead. The XXIV Panzer Corps (Walther Nehring) in an effective defensive position, had the opposing Soviet forces squeezed in. Vatutin decided to concentrate his strength at the northern bridgehead at Lyutezh.

The 3rd Guards Tank Army (Pavel Rybalko) moved northwards toward the Lyutezh bridgehead under cover of darkness and diversionary attacks out of the Bukrin bend. The Soviet preparations were considerable, including the installation of 26 bridges and 87 ferries. Many of the Soviet bridges were built underwater, making them difficult to detect. Feint attacks and the construction of fake bridges may have fooled the Germans for a short while. Fire support was provided by 7,000 guns and mortars and 700 combat aircraft. The 27th Army and 40th Army launched the Soviet diversionary attack at Bukrin on 1 November, two days ahead of schedule, but advanced only 1.5 km (0.93 mi) before being driven back.

Soviet historians claimed complete success for the Red Army deception measures but the Germans correctly identified the Soviet assault sector and sent armored reinforcements to the area. The 4th Panzer Army war diary referred to the main Soviet push north of Kiev on 3 November as "the offensive we have been expecting". The Germans were uncertain whether the anticipated Soviet assault had far-reaching objectives or was merely for the capture of a bridgehead to be exploited later.

== Initial stage ==
Early on the morning of 3 November 1943, the 4th Panzer Army was subjected to a massive Soviet bombardment. The Soviet 38th Army and 60th Army attacked in the first wave but failed to break through the positions of the German VII Army Corps. On 4 November, the 3rd Guards Tank Army and I Guard Cavalry Corps were added to the assault, compelling VII Army Corps to retreat, evacuating Kiev and the Soviets captured the city on 6 November. The second phase of the Soviet offensive now began, with the 1st Ukrainian Front objective consisting of the capture of the towns of Zhitomir, Korosten, Berdichev and Fastov and the cutting of the rail link to Army Group Center; the ultimate objective being the encirclement of Army Group South. By 7 November, the Soviet spearheads had already reached the important railway node at Fastov 50 km (31 mi) south-west of Kiev.

The plan went well at first for Vatutin; Manstein became worried, as Rybalko's tanks moved through the streets of Kiev on 6 November, Manstein pleaded with Adolf Hitler to release the 48th Panzer Corps and 40th Panzer Corps in order to have sufficient forces to retake Kiev. The 48th Panzer Corps was committed to Manstein. Hitler refused to divert the 40th Panzer Corps, and replaced Hoth with Erhard Raus, who was ordered to blunt the Soviet attack and secure the Army Group South northern flank and communications with Army Group Centre. A number of sources give 6 November as the date for the fall of Kiev. The 1st Czechoslovak Independent Brigade seems to have started the assault earlier, at 12:30 on 5 November, reaching the Dniepr at 02:00 on the 6th, after sweeping through the western suburbs of the city and were the first unit in the city center, with Kiev finally being captured at 06:50 on the 6th.

== Raus's counterattacks ==
Raus had some difficulty with his units suffering many casualties in the initial stages of Vatutin's offensive. The 4th Panzer Army was reinforced, especially with artillery and rockets. The German divisions were bolstered on 7 November by the arrival of the newly formed 25th Panzer Division commanded by General der Panzertruppen Georg Jauer. Its drive on Fastov was halted by the 7th Guards Tank Corps. The half-formed 25th Panzer Division had only emergency individual training, lacked equipment categories and was committed against the protests of Heinz Guderian, the Inspector of Panzer Troops. It became the first panzer division that failed to achieve at least initial offensive success on the Eastern Front. The failed German offensive stopped the advance of the Soviet 3rd Guards Tank Army.

The rest of the Soviet forces continued their attacks. Rybalko was soon just 40 mi (64 km) from Berdichev. Zhitomir was taken by the 38th Army on 12 November but the Soviet advance came to a halt as the I Guards Cavalry Corps looted the 4th Army alcohol stocks. The 60th Army took Korosten on 17 November and the 40th Army was moving south from Kiev. The only respite for the Germans came when the 27th Army exhausted itself and went over to the defensive in the Bukrin bend. In 10 days the Soviets had advanced 150 kilometers and opened a 100 kilometer-wide gap between Army Group Center and Army Group South.

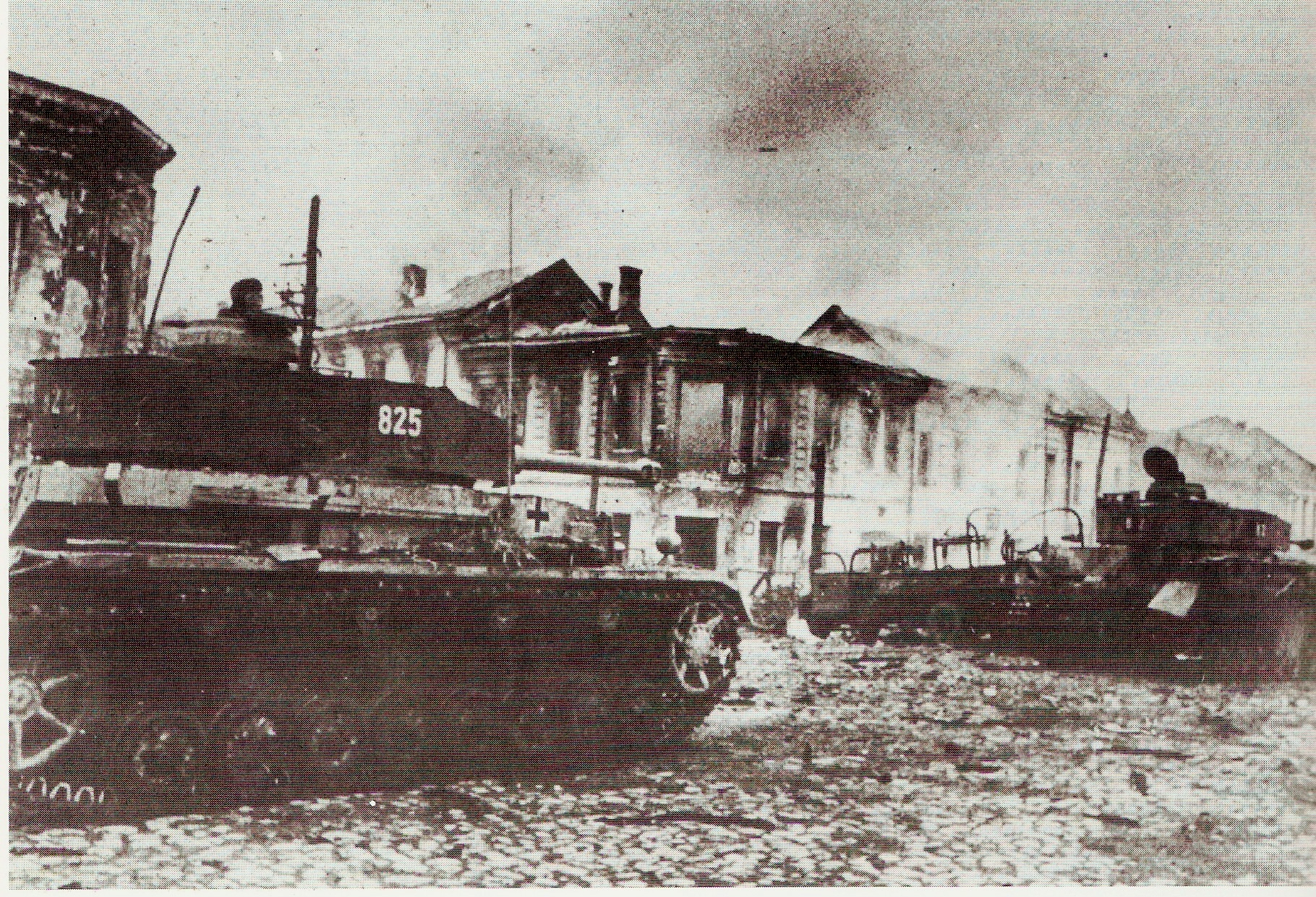
Panzer IVs in Zhitomir, November 1943

The 4th Panzer Army was in trouble but the situation changed with the arrival of Hermann Balck's XLVIII Panzer Corps, comprising the SS Division Leibstandarte, 1st Panzer Division and 7th Panzer Division. Balck drove his forces north to Brusyliv and then west to retake Zhitomir. Rybalko sent the 7th Guards Tank Corps to counter the German assault. A huge tank battle ensued, which continued until the latter part of November, when the autumn mud halted all operations. With the recapture of Zhitomir and Korosten, the 4th Panzer had gained some breathing room. With Vatutin halted, Stavka released substantial reserves to his First Ukrainian Front to regain momentum.

== Final stage ==
By 5 December, the mud had frozen. 48th Panzer Corps conducted a wide sweeping attack north of Zhitomir. Catching the Red Army by surprise, the German forces sought to encircle the Soviet 60th Army and the 13th Corps. Reinforced with the 2nd Parachute Division, the Germans drove eastward, putting the Soviets on the defensive. With Fastov also being threatened, the 60th Army withdrew from Korosten.

Vatutin was forced to ask Stavka for more reserves, and was allocated the 1st Tank Army and the 18th Army. These new units, along with additional Corps from other sectors, were hastily rushed westward. Thus, the Red Army stopped the German advance, went back on the offensive, and retook Brusilov. Both sides were exhausted by late December and the battle for Kiev was over.

== Aftermath ==
Although the Soviets had failed to break the rail link with Army Group Center or envelop Army Group South, they had broken the Dnieper line, taken Kiev, the third biggest city in the Soviet Union, and inflicted significant casualties on the 4th Panzer Army. The Germans, for their part, had bloodied several sizable Soviet formations and kept the vital rail link open, but failed in their attempt to encircle and destroy the Soviet spearheads. A few days after XLVIII Panzer Corps was pulled out to rest and refit, the Soviets launched Dnieper–Carpathian Offensive on the 24th of December. The renamed Voronezh Front Offensive pushed the Germans back to the 1939 Polish border by 3 January 1944.

== See also ==
- National Museum-Preserve of Ukrainian military achievements

== Sources ==
- Frieser, Karl-Heinz; Schmider, Klaus; Schönherr, Klaus; Schreiber, Gerhard; Ungváry, Kristián; Wegner, Bernd (2007). Die Ostfront 1943/44 – Der Krieg im Osten und an den Nebenfronten [The Eastern Front 1943–1944: The War in the East and on the Neighbouring Fronts]. Das Deutsche Reich und der Zweite Weltkrieg [Germany and the Second World War] (in German). Vol. VIII. München: Deutsche Verlags-Anstalt. ISBN 978-3-421-06235-2.
