= Aleksey Burdeyny =

Soviet colonel general (1908–1987)

Aleksey Semyonovich Burdeyny
- Born: October 18, 1908; Zhytomir, Russian Empire
- Died: April 21, 1987 (aged 78); Moscow, Soviet Union
- Burial place: Kuntsevo Cemetery
- Military career
- Allegiance: Soviet Union
- Service years: 1931–1974
- Rank: Colonel-General
- Commands: 2nd Guards Tank Corps
- Conflicts: World War II
- Awards: Hero of the Soviet Union

Aleksey Semyonovich Burdeyny (Russian: Алексей Семёнович Бурдейный, Ukrainian: Олексій Семенович Бурдейний; 18 October 1908 – 21 April 1987) was a Soviet colonel general who held corps command during World War II.

== Early life and prewar service ==
A Ukrainian, Aleksey Semyonovich Burdeyny was born in a working-class family on 18 October 1908 in Zhitomir. He graduated from a Rabfak and worked in a factory in his native town. He became a member of the Communist Party in 1928. In June 1931, he was drafted into the Red Army and sent to the Saratov Armored School for command training. On graduation in March 1932, Burdeyny was posted to the Kalinovsky Mechanized Brigade as a platoon commander. Stationed in the Moscow Military District, the brigade was one of the first Soviet armored units. Burdeyny was transferred to the Monino airfield as a senior technician in October 1933, but in September 1935 returned to the brigade, in which he commanded tank and training companies.

In September 1937 he was sent to the Military Academy of Mechanization and Motorization for advanced training, graduating in May 1940 to become the chief of the 2nd Section of the headquarters of the 53rd Tank Regiment of the 81st Motorized Division, part of the 4th Mechanized Corps of the Kiev Special Military District. Burdeyny was transferred to the corps headquarters in October 1940 to serve as assistant chief of its Operations Department.

== World War II ==
After Germany invaded the Soviet Union, Burdeyny took part in the border battles in the region of Lvov. In July he was transferred to serve as senior assistant to the chief of the armored service of the 37th Army, taking part in the Battle of Kiev. With a consolidated group, he fought his way through the German rear while encircled. In August Burdeyny took command of the 3rd Tank Regiment of the 3rd Tank Brigade of the Southwestern and Southern Fronts. He took part in the Rostov Defensive Operation and the Rostov Offensive Operation, in which the unit helped liberate Rostov-on-Don. In January 1942 Burdeyny was transferred to serve as chief of staff of the 2nd Tank Brigade of the Southern Front.

In April 1942, when the 24th Tank Corps was formed, Burdeyny joined it as chief of staff to corps commander General Vasily Badanov. The Corps was sent to engage the advancing German forces in the South, and was nearly wiped out in the fighting near the Don River, during July. By late October, the unit has recovered from its losses after several months in the reserve. It was assigned to the Southwestern Front and took part in the Battle of Stalingrad. On December, the Corps destroyed the Tatsinskaya Airport and was renamed 2nd Tatsinskaya Guards Tank Corps in honor of this operation. After the Battle of Stalingrad the Corps was made part of the Voronezh Front on March. On 26 June 1943, Colonel Burdeyny assumed command over the Corps, holding the post to the end of the war. As such, he participated in the Battle of Kursk, and was promoted to Major General on 31 August. On 3 July 1944, during Operation Bagration, his units were the first to enter Minsk and liberated the city. He was promoted to the rank of Lieutenant General on the 2 November 1944. The Corps later took part in the Baltic, East Prussian, Vistula-Oder and Berlin operations. For his leadership during the Minsk Offensive he was awarded the title Hero of the Soviet Union (Medal no. 5026) on 19 April 1945.

== Postwar ==
In May 1946, Burdeyny was assigned as the 7th Mechanized Army's chief of staff. He studied at the Voroshilov Academy from December 1947 to February 1950. In October 1950, he became the commander of the 8th Mechanized Army, a position he held until June 1953. In April 1954, he was transferred to serve as the Belorussian Military District's deputy commander for tank troops. In January 1958, he was posted as deputy commander for training, and from May 1960 he served as the First Deputy Commander of the District.

In August 1963, he was assigned as the Chief of the Central Armored Directorate in the Ministry of Defence. In August 1970 he was appointed representative of the Warsaw Pact Chief-of-Staff to the East German National People's Army, and retired from the Armed Forces in January 1974. He lived in Moscow and died on 21 April 1987.

== Honours and awards ==
Burdeyny was a recipient of the following decorations:

- Hero of the Soviet Union (including Order of Lenin and Gold Star medal - No. 5026, 19 April 1945) - for skillful command of a tank corps in the Belorussian operation, exemplary fulfillment of the command in the battles against the Nazi invaders, and for his heroism and courage
- Two Orders of Lenin
- Order of the Red Banner, four times
- Order of Suvorov, 2nd Class, twice
- Order of Kutuzov, 2nd class
- Order of the Patriotic War, 1st class
- Two Orders of the Red Star
- Honorary citizen of the hero city of Minsk (since 1967)
- Deputy in the 3rd Convocation of the Ukrainian SSR's Supreme Soviet
- Order of the British Empire
- Virtuti Militari
- Patriotic Order of Merit

== Memory ==
A street in Minsk is named after Alexey Burdeyny, and a memorial plaque is installed there.
