= 4th Guards Tank Army =

- 4-я гвардейская танковая армия
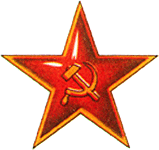
- Active: March 18, 1945–1960
- Disbanded: Predecessor: 4th Tank Army (1943–1945); Successor: 20th Guards Combined Arms Army (1960)
- Allegiance: Armed Forces of the Soviet Union
- Branch: Land
- Type: Tank Forces
- Role: Tank Army
- Engagements: Upper Silesian Operation; Berlin Operation; Prague Operation
- Battle honours: Soviet Guard

Commanders
- Notable commanders: Dmitry Lelyushenko

The 4th Guards Tank Army was an operational military unit within the Armed Forces of the Soviet Union during the Great Patriotic War and in the post–war period.

== Battle path during the Great Patriotic War ==
=== Fighting in Upper Silesia ===
The 4th Guards Tank Army was formed on March 18, 1945, by transforming the 4th Tank Army of the 1st Ukrainian Front during the Upper Silesian Operation. It included the Directorate, the 6th Guards Lvov Mechanized Corps, the 10th Guards Volunteer Tank Corps, the 68th Guards Tank Brigade and a number of separate formations and units. During the operation, the army participated in the encirclement and liquidation of the Oppeln Group of German troops, which was liquidated by March 22. On March 24, the 5th Guards Mechanized Corps was included in the army, in which, in addition to artillery and motorized rifles, there were 150 tanks.

On March 24, 1945, the 5th Guards Mechanized Corps went on the attack in the direction of Leobschütz – Troppau, but did not achieve much success and was able to advance only 3–4 km. In connection with this, the army commander brought the 6th Guards Mechanized Corps into battle in the direction of Stoiberwitz. This maneuver yielded results, the corps advanced 10 km deep into the enemy's defenses and created a direct threat to the encirclement of the 1st Panzer Division of the Leibstandarte Adolf Hitler Guards, which until that time had held back the advance of the 10th Guards Tank Corps. In the next 3 days, the army completed the encirclement of German troops in the Biskau Region and, in cooperation with the 60th Army, destroyed them.

=== Battle for Berlin ===
On April 3, the army left its combat sector in Upper Silesia of the 60th Army and returned to the Forst Area, where it was supposed to take part in the Berlin Operation. The 4th Guards Tank Army received the task of entering the breakthrough of the 5th Guards Army, and after it had broken through the enemy's defenses on the Neisse and Spree Rivers, overtaking the battle formations of rifle units, it was necessary to rapidly develop the offensive in the direction of Spremberg and on the sixth day of the operation capture the cities of Dessau and Rathenow. Before the start of the operation, a number of formations and units of the army received the rank of guards.

On April 16, units of the army went on the offensive. Successfully advancing, the 4th Guards Tank Army captured the cities of Spremberg, Calau, Luckau, Babelsberg and on April 21 reached the approaches to the southwestern suburbs of Berlin. The 63rd Guards Tank Brigade under the command of Colonel Mikhail Fomichev, acting as the vanguard of the 4th Guards Tank Army, defeated the German garrison in Babelsberg (south of the outskirts of Berlin) and freed 7,000 prisoners from concentration camps. Among them was French Prime Minister Édouard Herriot and his wife. On April 22, the 5th Guards Mechanized Corps captured the cities of Beelitz, Treuenbritzen and Jüterbog, where the airfield and about 300 enemy aircraft were captured. Having reached the Treyenbritzen–Beelitz Line, the corps started a battle with the advanced units of the 12th German Army of General Wenck, which was trying to break through to Berlin. All enemy attacks were repulsed, and his units were thrown back to their original position. On April 23, the 10th Guards Tank Corps crossed the Teltow Canal.

Having entered the German capital from the south, the 4th Guards Tank Army was rapidly moving towards joining forces with the troops of the 1st Belorussian Front, closing the encirclement around Berlin from the west. On the night of April 25, the 35th Guards Mechanized Brigade of the 6th Guards Mechanized Corps captured the city of Ketzin, 22 km west of Berlin, where it joined up with the 328th Rifle Division of the 77th Rifle Corps and with the 65th Guards Tank Brigade of the 1st Belorussian Front, closing the encirclement in the area.

After that, the 4th Guards Tank Army continued to perform tasks: firstly, it had to reliably close the enemy's exit routes from Berlin to the southwest, and secondly, to prevent the 12th Army from reaching Berlin, which had the main task of releasing Berlin from 200,000–strong garrison, and, thirdly, not to release the remnants of the 9th German Army, breaking through the rear of our army in the Luckenwalde Region to the west, into the American zone. On the morning of May 2, the German troops, breaking through from the encirclement, went to the location of the army headquarters. The repulse of the attack was personally led by the Army Commander Dmitry Lelyushenko, and by noon the enemy was defeated.

On May 1, the decisive blow of the 5th Guards Mechanized Corps to the west and the 6th Guards Mechanized Corps to the east and southeast, in cooperation with units of the 13th Army of General Pukhov, completely defeated the formations of the 12th and the remnants of the 9th Armies of the enemy. Belov's 10th Guards Tank Corps, along with other army formations, continued to persistently storm the southwestern part of Berlin, pressing the enemy against the Brandenburg Gate. On May 2, the Berlin Garrison capitulated.

During the Berlin Operation, the troops of the 4th Guards Tank Army destroyed 42,850 enemy soldiers and officers, 31,350 were taken prisoner, 556 tanks and armored personnel carriers, 1,178 guns and mortars were burned and captured.

=== Prague Operation ===
The 4th Guards Tank Army, as part of the 1st Ukrainian Front, took part in the Prague Operation, the last offensive operation of the Soviet troops in Europe. On May 3, the army gave its combat sector to the 69th Army of the 1st Belorussian Front and began to concentrate in the forests 35–50 km south of Berlin to prepare an attack on Prague. The army was ordered to advance in the zone of the 13th Army along the western banks of the Elbe and Vltava Rivers in the general direction of Teplice – Shanov – Prague.

On May 5, units of the army crossed the Elbe in the Torgau Region. On May 6, the army went on the offensive, a day earlier than planned, due to the start of the Prague Uprising. By the evening of May 6, the army troops, having traveled 50 km, reached the line of Waldheim, Siebelen, and advanced detachments advanced up to 65 km, captured an important railway junction – the city of Freiberg. On May 7, the 4th Guards Tank Army advanced another 50–60 km, to the Frauenstein–Sayda Line. Soon all the passes through the Ore Mountains were occupied by Soviet units. The 10th Guards Tank Corps occupied Teplice and Shanov, and the 6th Guards Mechanized Corps took Duhtsev.

On the night of May 8, the 10th Guards Mechanized Brigade, acting as an advance detachment of the army, defeated the headquarters of Army Group Center in the area of the city of Žatec, thereby completely paralyzing the control of German troops.

Acting in difficult mountainous conditions, the guardsmen of the 16th Mechanized Brigade of Grigory Shcherbak broke into the city of Most, which is of great military–industrial importance, on the morning of May 8. There was placed a large plant for the production of synthetic gasoline. The brigade destroyed more than 20 enemy guns, defeated the Nazi garrison and liberated the city.

On the night of May 9, the 63rd Guards Tank Brigade broke into Prague. At 04:00 in the morning, the entire 10th Guards Tank Corps entered the Czech capital and reached its northeastern outskirts, eastern and southeastern outskirts. 6th Guards Mechanized Corps – to the southern and southwestern outskirts of the city. 5th Guards Mechanized Corps – to the western outskirts. Together with these units, the 3rd Guards Tank Army, 3rd Guards and 13th Armies also entered the city.

The 4th Guards Tank Army, by order of the front command, after the liberation of Prague, advanced to the east and southeast and cut off the escape routes of the defeated German troops to the west. The 11th Guards Mechanized Brigade of the 5th Guards Mechanized Corps, acting in the direction of Pilsen, at 11:00 on May 9, met with the 2nd Infantry Division of the 5th Army Corps of the 3rd American Army in the Rzhychany Area (20 km east of Pilsen).

During the Prague Operation from May 6 to May 10, 1945, the 4th Guards Tank Army, having fought about 200 km, destroyed and captured about 200 tanks and armored personnel carriers, 246 guns and mortars, 6290 vehicles, captured 48 thousand German soldiers and officers, including 9 generals.

== Post–war period ==
After the end of the war, the 4th Guards Tank Army was included in the Central Group of Forces and was located in the Soviet Occupation Zone. In 1946, the army was renamed the 4th Guards Mechanized Army. Its corps were converted into divisions. In November 1946, due to a decrease in the personnel of the Armed Forces of the Soviet Union, the 4th Guards Mechanized Army was transformed into the 4th Guards Separate Personnel Tank Division. Accordingly, its divisions were transformed into separate personnel regiments, regiments into separate personnel battalions or divizions, separate battalions into separate personnel companies or batteries.

During 1949, a full–fledged 4th Guards Mechanized Army was re–formed from separate personnel units as part of the 6th and 7th Guards Mechanized and 10th Guards Tank Divisions. In 1958, it was again renamed the 4th Guards Tank Army. In 1960, it was transformed into the 20th Guards Combined Arms Army.

== Army commanders ==
- Colonel General Dmitry Lelyushenko (March 1945 – August 30, 1947);
- Lieutenant General of the Tank Troops Viktor Obukhov (August 30, 1947 – December 15, 1951);
- Major General of the Tank Troops Pyotr Kalinichenko (December 15, 1951 – May 11, 1953);
- Lieutenant General Vladimir Komarov (May 11, 1953 – January 10, 1955);
- Lieutenant General of the Tank Troops Vladimir Chizh (January 10, 1955 – January 22, 1960).

== In the composition ==
- 1st Ukrainian Front (March – June 1945);
- Group of Soviet Troops in Germany (June 1945 – 1960).

== Composition of the army ==
=== On 1 April 1945 ===
- Control;
- 5th Guards Mechanized Corps;
  - 10th Guards Mechanized Brigade;
  - 11th Guards Mechanized Brigade;
  - 12th Guards Mechanized Brigade;
  - 24th Guards Tank Brigade;
  - Number of Separate Artillery and Engineering Units;
- 6th Guards Mechanized Corps;
  - 16th Guards Mechanized Brigade;
  - 17th Guards Mechanized Brigade;
  - 49th Mechanized Brigade;
  - 29th Separate Tank Regiment (from March 17, 1945 – 117th Guards Tank Regiment);
  - 56th Separate Tank Regiment (from March 17, 1945 – 118th Guards Tank Regiment);
  - Number of Separate Artillery and Engineering Units;
- 10th Guards Volunteer Tank Corps;
  - 61st Guards Tank Brigade;
  - 62nd Guards Tank Brigade;
  - 63rd Guards Tank Brigade;
  - Number of Separate Artillery and Engineering Units;
- 68th Guards Tank Brigade;
- 6th Guards Anti–Aircraft Artillery Division;
- 200th Light Artillery Brigade;
- Number of Separate Artillery and Engineering Units.

Parts of army subordination:

- 6th Separate Guards Communications Regiment (Lvov, Orders of Bogdan Khmelnitsky, Alexander Nevsky and the Red Star);
- 3rd Guards Motorized Engineering Brigade.

=== For 1946 ===
- Control;
- 10th Guards Tank Division;
- 25th Tank Division;
- 5th Guards Mechanized Division;
- 6th Guards Mechanized Division;
- 7th Guards Mechanized Division.

=== For 1958 ===
- Control;
- 6th Guards Motor Rifle Division;
- 11th Guards Motor Rifle Division;
- 10th Guards Tank Division.

== Sources ==
- Tank Armies // Radio Control – Tachanka / Under the General Editorship of Nikolay Ogarkov – Moscow: Military Publishing House of the Ministry of Defense of the Soviet Union, 1980 – Soviet Military Encyclopedia: In 8 Volumes; 1976–1980, Volume 7
- Dmitry Lelyushenko. Moscow–Stalingrad–Berlin–Prague. Notes of the Commander of the Army – Moscow: Nauka, 1987
- Vasily Ashkerov, Alekseev V. M., Andrianov V. M. and others. Steel Ram: Battle Path of the 4th Guards Tank Army – Moscow: Military Publishing House of the Ministry of Defense of the Russian Federation, 1992 – 251 Pages – ISBN 5-203-01017-X
- Mikhail Fomichev. The Path Began from the Urals – Moscow: Military Publishing House of the Ministry of Defense of the Soviet Union, 1976
- Nikolay Shishkin (June 26, 2003). "Formidable Armor was Advancing" (Red Star ed.).
- Vitaly Feskov, Valery Golikov, Konstantin Kalashnikov, Sergey Slugin. The Armed Forces of the Soviet Union after the Second World War: from the Red Army to the Soviet. Part 1: Ground Forces / Under the Scientific Editorship of Valery Golikov – Tomsk: Publishing House of Scientific and Technical Literature, 2013 – 640 Pages – ISBN 978-5-89503-530-6
