= 5th Guards Tank Brigade =

5th Separate Guards Tatsinskaya Red Banner Order of Suvorov Tank Brigade
- 5-я отдельная гвардейская танковая Тацинская Краснознамённая, ордена Суворова бригада
- Active: 2009–present
- Country: Russia
- Branch: Russian Ground Forces
- Type: Armoured warfare
- Size: Brigade
- Part of: 36th Combined Arms Army; Eastern Military District
- Garrison/HQ: Ulan-Ude, Republic of Buryatia; MUN 46108
- Engagements: Russo-Ukrainian War; Russian invasion of Ukraine; Northern Ukraine campaign; Battle of Ivankiv; Eastern Ukraine campaign; 2024 Velyka Novosilka offensive
- Decorations: Guards; Order of the Red Banner; Order of Suvorov 2nd Class
- Battle honours: Tatsinskaya

The 5th Separate Guards Tatsinskaya Red Banner Order of Suvorov Tank Brigade (Russian: 5-я отдельная гвардейская танковая Тацинская Краснознамённая, ордена Суворова бригада) is a military formation of the Russian Ground Forces. It is subordinate to the 36th Combined Arms Army of the Eastern Military District and is garrisoned in Ulan-Ude, Republic of Buryatia. Its military unit number is 46108. Formed in 2009, the 5th Tank Brigade is the successor formation to the 2nd Guards Tank Corps.

== History ==
=== World War II ===
It traces its history back to the 24th Tank Corps, which received the honorary name "Tatsinskaya" for Raid on Tatsinskaya during the Battle of Stalingrad in December 1942. During the raid, the 24th Tank Corps under the command of Major General Vasily Badanov, destroyed an airfield with 70 transport aircraft Junkers Ju 52 and Heinkel Air Force of Nazi Germany, through which supplies were being delivered to the German 6th Field Army, which was surrounded on November 23, 1942, and destroyed the railway station Tatsinskaya, where supplies for the surrounded German 6th Field Army had accumulated. The raid was carried out during the Operation Little Saturn by the 1st and 3rd Guards Armies against the 8th Italian Army and the German operational Hollidt Group. The 18th, 24th, 25th tank corps were attached to the 1st Guards Army to reinforce it.

On 16 December 1942, the 1st Guards Army broke through the Italian defences. The 24th Tank Corps, with 89 T-34 and 59 T-70, entered the resulting breakthrough and crossed the Don River on December 17 at 11:30–18:30. The 24th Tank Corps moved along the enemy rear, destroying garrisons in populated areas. By December 24, the 8th Italian Army was scattered. This opened the way to the airfield near the village of Tatsinskaya. At 7:30 on December 24, the corps attacked the village and the airfield nearby. Then the 24th Tank Corps was surrounded until December 27. On December 28, the 24th Tank Corps emerged from the cauldron, under pressure from the counterattacking 6th and 11th tank divisions.

On December 26, 1942, the 24th Tank Corps was transformed into the 2nd Guards Tank Corps. In 1944, during the fighting on the approaches to Minsk as part of Red Army offensive, a company of medium tanks of the 1st tank battalion of the 26th Guards Tank Brigade of the 2nd Guards Tatsinsky Tank Corps under the command of Guards Senior Lieutenant Yakovlev, Aleksandr Alekseevich was one of the first to break into Minsk. Having engaged in battle for the freight station, he surrounded the retreating enemy and captured 56 soldiers and officers along with the commander of this unit.

After the end of the war, in 1945, the 2nd Guards Tank Corps was transformed into the 2nd Guards Tank Division.

=== 21st Century ===
During the military reform in 2009, the 2nd Guards Tank Division was reorganized into the 5th Separate Guards Tank Brigade. In 2015, the 5th Tank Brigade was shown to be one of the Russian army units actively participating in the war in Donbas, having been present in the Battle of Debaltseve.

On December 5, 2016, the brigade commander Colonel Ruslan Galitsky was killed in action as the unit was deployed to Syria.

=== Russian invasion of Ukraine ===
According to the Institute for the Study of War, during the full-scale Russian invasion of Ukraine in 2022, the 5th Armored Brigade took part in the battle for Vuhledar. Ukraine accuses two servicemen of the brigade - Bayaskhalan Shultumov and Pavel Aganayev - of violating the law on the "rules and customs of war" by robbing a house in the village of Buzova in the Bucha district of Ukraine. Another one - Nikolai Sokovikov - is accused of killing two unarmed civilians near the village of Mriya in the Bucha district. At least 14 servicemen of the brigade have died in Ukraine as of early April 2022. The Ukrainian prosecutor's office claims that the brigade participated in the occupation of Bucha.

== Composition ==
Composition of the 5th Separate Guards Tank Brigade in 2017

- Brigade HQ;
- 1st tank battalion;
- 2nd tank battalion;
- 3rd tank battalion;
- motorized rifle battalion;
- self-propelled howitzer artillery division;
- rocket artillery division;
- anti-aircraft missile division;
- anti-aircraft division;
- command (communications) battalion;
- logistics battalion;
- separate rifle company (snipers);
- separate reconnaissance company;
- separate engineer-sapper company;
- separate NBC protection company;
- separate electronic warfare company;
- separate repair company;
- separate commandant company;
- separate medical company;
- command platoon (chief of artillery);
- command and radar reconnaissance platoon (chief of air defense);
- command platoon (chief of intelligence department);
- instructor platoon;
- separate military police platoon
- training ground;
- military orchestra.

In service: 90 units T-72B3, 4 units T-72BK, 49 units BMP-1, 18 units Tornado-G, 18 units 152-mm SG 2S3M "Akatsiya", 8 units 120-mm mortars 2S12 "Sani", 6 units BTR-80, 3 units BRM-3K, 12 units BM 9K332M "Tor-M2U", Borisoglebsk-2, 6 units. BM 9A34(35) "Strela-10", 6 units ZSU-23-4 "Shilka", 36 units MANPADS 9K38 Igla. 2901 personnel.

== Commanders ==
- Guards Colonel Galchishak, Nikolai Nikolaevich
- Guards Colonel Bolgarev, Petr Nikolaevich
- Guards Colonel Galitsky, Ruslan Viktorovich (2016)

== Equipment ==
The division's vehicles are for MBTs T-62 M/MV, T-72 B/B obr.1989 and B3 models of the T-72. T-80 BVs and T-90 A/AK. The division's armoured personnel carrier and infantry fighting vehicle are BMP-1, BMP-2 and BTR-80.
