= Georgy Rodin =

Red army lieutenant general

Georgy Semyonovich Rodin
- Георгий Семёнович Родин
- Born: 19 November 1897; Bolotovo village, Orlovsky Uyezd, Oryol Governorate, Russian Empire
- Died: 6 January 1976 (aged 78); Oryol, Soviet Union
- Military career
- Allegiance: Russian Empire (1916–1917); Soviet Union (1918–1946)
- Branch: Imperial Russian Army (1916–1917); Red Army (1918–1946)
- Service years: 1916–1917; 1918–1946
- Rank: Lieutenant general
- Commands: 47th Tank Division; 30th Tank Corps; 10th Guards Tank Corps
- Conflicts: World War I; Russian Civil War; World War II; Soviet invasion of Poland; Winter War; Battle of Stalingrad; Operation Kutuzov; Dnieper-Carpathian Offensive
- Awards: Order of Lenin; Order of the Red Banner (3); Order of the Red Star

Georgy Semyonovich Rodin (Russian: Георгий Семёнович Родин; 19 November 1897 – 6 January 1976) was a Red Army lieutenant general. Rodin fought in World War I as a non-commissioned officer of the Imperial Russian Army. He joined the Red Army in 1918 and became an officer, fighting in the Russian Civil War. In 1938, he was transferred to the reserve but returned to active duty in 1939 and led a tank battalion in the Soviet invasion of Poland. Rodin led a tank regiment in the Winter War and became commander of a brigade in December 1940. The brigade became the 47th Tank Division in March 1941.

After Operation Barbarossa, the division retreated across Ukraine. Rodin was seriously wounded in the battle for Poltava. In March 1942, Rodin took command of a tank brigade and in June became commander of the 28th Tank Corps, which he led during the Battle of Stalingrad. He became commander of Southwestern Front tank troops in October and was given command of the 30th Tank Corps. During the summer, the corps fought in Operation Kutuzov and became the 10th Guards Tank Corps for its actions. During the February 1944 Dnieper–Carpathian Offensive, Rodin reportedly sent an incorrect message about the capture of Volochysk to army headquarters. For this he was relieved of command and sent to command a training tank brigade in the rear. Rodin retired in 1946 and died in 1976 in Oryol.

== Early life and early military career ==
Rodin was born on 19 November 1897 in Bolotovo village of Oryol Governorate. In July 1916, he joined the Imperial Russian Army and was sent to the 32nd Reserve Regiment at Vladimir. In November, he was sent to the Western Front and became a platoon commander of the 219th Kotelnichevsky Regiment in the 55th Infantry Division. He fought in the Baranovichi area. In March 1918, he was discharged with the rank of senior non-commissioned officer.

In June 1918, Rodin was drafted into the Red Army and became a platoon commander at the Oryol Military Commissariat. In November, he became a cadet in the Oryol Infantry Courses and upon graduation in August 1919 became a platoon commander in the Consolidated Oryol Regiment. Around this time, he joined the Communist Party of the Soviet Union.

From April 1920, he was a platoon commander, company commander and assistant chief of intelligence of a reserve regiment of the 9th Kuban Army. In February 1921, Rodin became a platoon commander of the 2nd Rifle Regiment of the 18th Kuban Army. He fought on the Southern Front against the White Army led by Anton Denikin and Konstantin Mamontov, as well as against rebellions in Chechnya, Kabardia and Ingushetia. For his actions, Rodin was awarded honorary weapons by the Military Council of the North Caucasus Military District.

== Interwar ==
After the end of the war, Rodin served in the 2nd, 115th and 65th Rifle Regiments in the 9th Army as a platoon commander, assistant company commander and deputy battalion commander. In 1923, he graduated from the Rostov refresher courses and in 1925 from the Vystrel Postgraduate Commanders' Courses. In December 1926 he was acting company commander and then battalion commander and chief of the headquarters of the Vladikavkaz Infantry School. Rodin was also appointed commandant of Rostov.

In December 1930, Rodin became the assistant commander and then commander of the 234th Rifle Regiment. He became commander of the separate tank battalion and tank troops in the 25th Rifle Division from December 1933. In 1934, he graduated from the Commanders' Technological Improvement Courses. In 1936, Rodin was awarded the Order of the Red Star for his unit's performance in training. He transferred to the reserve in April 1938 but restored to active service in May 1939. Rodin became commander of the 21st Tank Brigade's 27th Tank Battalion. In September, he led the unit in the Soviet invasion of Poland. At the beginning of 1940, the 24th Tank Division's 24th Tank Regiment was formed under Rodin's leadership. Between 12 February and March he led it in the Winter War. In December 1940, Rodin was given command of the 23rd Light Tank Brigade, which became the 47th Tank Division in March 1941, part of the 18th Mechanized Corps.

== World War II ==
After Operation Barbarossa, the 18th Mechanized Corps covered the retreat of the 12th Army and the 18th Army. In the Haisyn the 47th Tank Division was encircled but managed to break out. During the battle for Poltava, Rodin was severely wounded. In March 1942, he became commander of the 52nd Tank Brigade. On 27 March, he received the Order of the Red Banner. In June, he was given command of the 28th Tank Corps. In July, the corps was subordinated to the 1st Tank Army and then to the 62nd Army. The corps fought in the attempt to break through to encircled 62nd Army units on the Don during late July. On 27 July, elements of the corps crossed the Don and achieved some success against the 3rd Infantry Division and 60th Infantry Division. On 4 August, Rodin was promoted to Major general. In late August, the corps was put in reserve in the Volga Military District. From October, Rodin was the commander of the Tank Troops of the Southwestern Front.

In April 1943, Rodin became commander of the 30th Urals Volunteer Tank Corps, then in the Reserve of the Supreme High Command (Stavka Reserve). On 7 June he was promoted to Lieutenant general. In July the corps became part of the 4th Tank Army. From 30 July, the corps was part of the Bryansk Front and fought in Operation Kutuzov. According to Vasily Badanov, the corps advanced 65 kilometers between 26 July and 11 August. On 27 August, he was awarded the Order of the Red Banner again. From September, the corps was in Stavka reserve. In October it became the 10th Guards Tank Corps for its actions. In February 1944, the corps was part of the 1st Ukrainian Front and fought in the Proskurov-Chernivtsi Offensive, part of the Dnieper–Carpathian Offensive. During the battle, an inaccurate message about the capture of Volochysk was sent to army headquarters. Despite a successful battle Rodin was relieved of command and on 25 April appointed commander of the 6th Training Tank Brigade. On 3 November, he was awarded a third Order of the Red Banner for over 20 years of service. Rodin received the Order of Lenin on 21 February 1945 for 25 years of service.

== Postwar ==
In the summer of 1945 Rodin became commander of the Belorussian Tank Camp. He retired in July 1946 and returned to Oryol. He became head of the Oryol DOSAAF committee and was a member of the CPSU regional committee. On 2 November 1972 he was declared an honorary citizen of Oryol. Rodin died on 6 January 1976.

== Personal life ==
Rodin married Militsa Georgiyevna.
