= 2nd Guards Tank Corps =

Tank corps of the Soviet military

24th Tank Corps (1942–1943) 2nd Guards Tank Corps (1943–1945) 2nd Guards Tank Division (1945–2001)
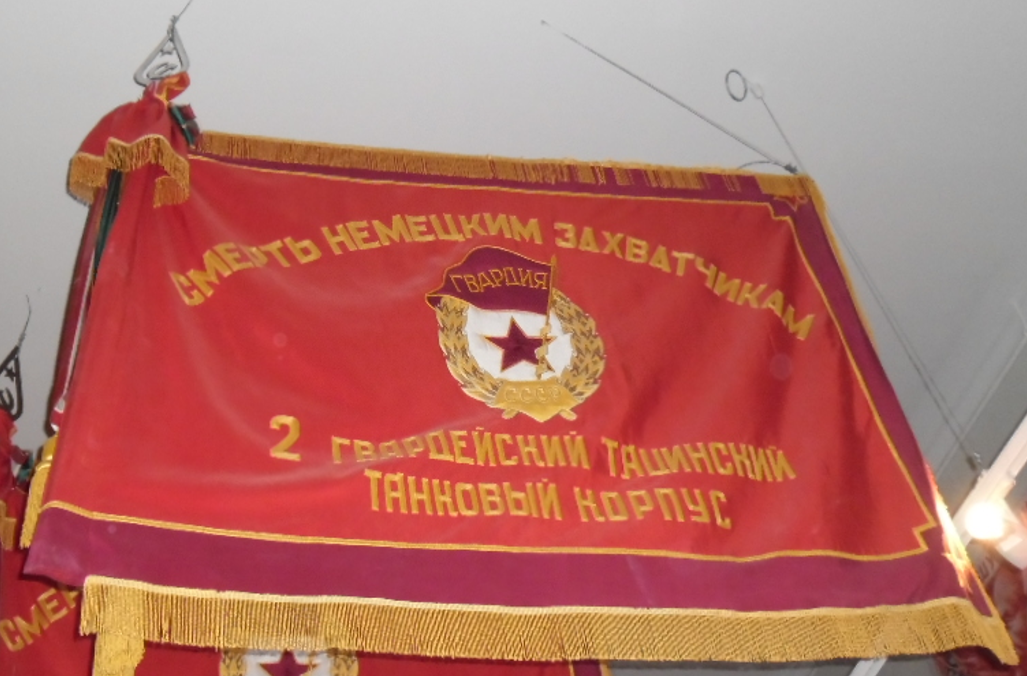
- Guards banner of the corps
- Active: 1942–2001
- Country: Soviet Union (1942–1991); Russia (1991–2001)
- Branch: Red Army (1942–1991); Russian Ground Forces (1991–2001)
- Type: Armored
- Role: Breakthrough and Exploitation in Deep Operations
- Size: Corps (120–200 tanks)
- Part of: 36th Combined Arms Army
- Garrison/HQ: Ulan-Ude
- Nickname: Tatsinkaya
- Engagements: World War II; Stalingrad Defense; Operation Saturn; Tatsinskaya Raid; Battle of Kursk; Battle of Prokhorovka; Baltic Operation
- Decorations: Order of the Red Banner; Order of Suvorov, 2nd Class
- Honorifics: Tatsinsk

Commanders
- Notable commanders: V. M. Badanov

The 2nd Guards Tatsinskaya Tank Corps was a tank corps of the Soviet Union's Red Army that saw service during World War II on the Eastern Front of Europe. The unit's most notable moment was in the raid on Tatsinskaya during Operation Little Saturn in World War II. After the war, it continued to serve with the Soviet occupation forces in Central Europe. It was originally the 24th Tank Corps. The formation had approximately the same size and combat power as a Wehrmacht Panzer Division, and less than a British Armoured Division had during World War II.

After the war the Corps became the 2nd Guards Tank Division in 1945.

During the 21st century, the division was reformed into the 5th Guards Tank Brigade, as part of the 36th Combined Arms Army.

== World War II ==
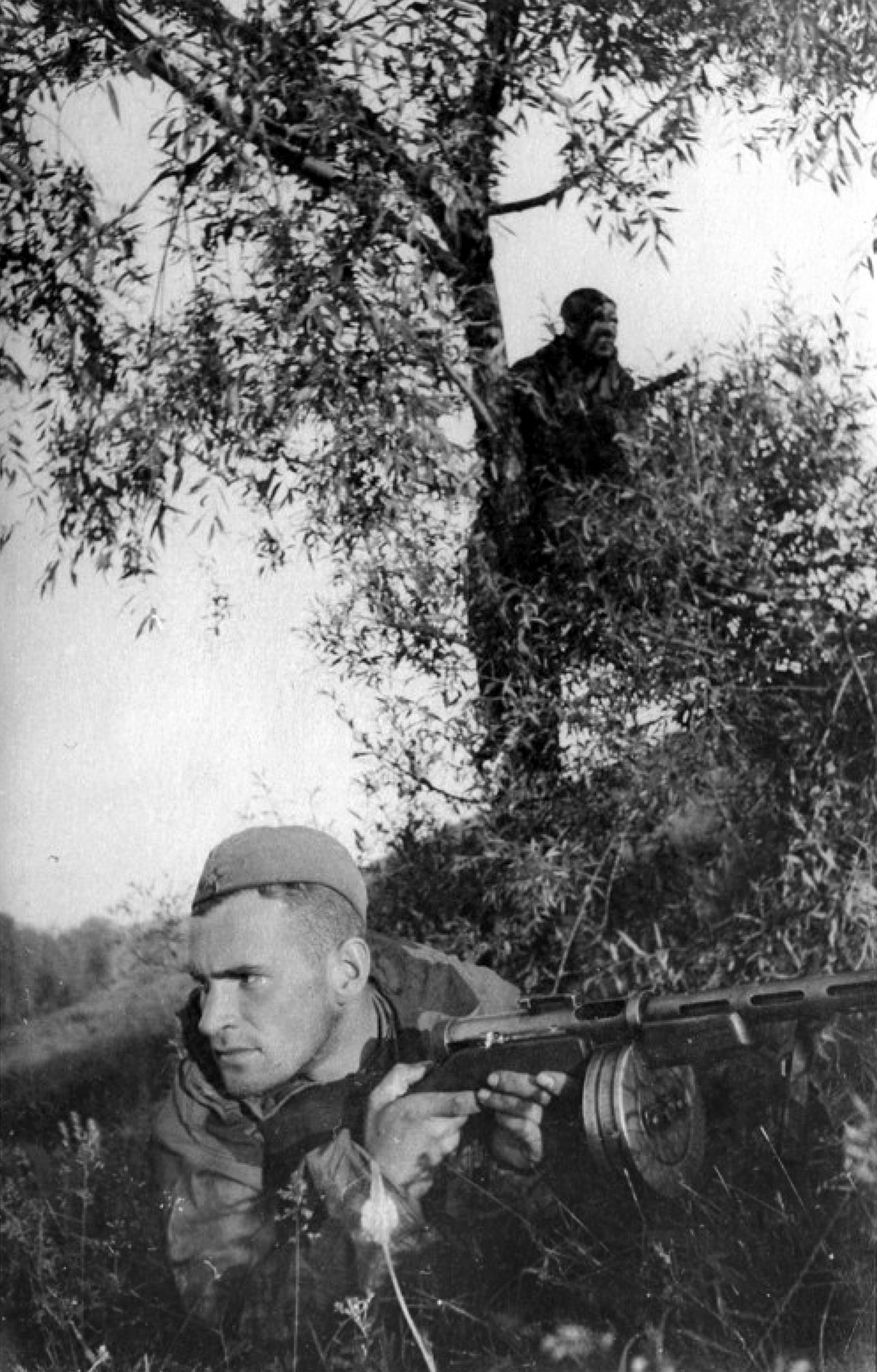
Scouts Ivan Kostrygin (killed 6 August 1942) and Mikhail Zhinzhikov (killed 21 October 1943) of headquarters company, 4th Guards Tank Brigade, June 1942.

The 24th Tank Corps was formed in 1942 during re-establishment of the tank corps as a formation. It was equipped with a mix of T-34 medium, T-60 light, KV-1 heavy, and U.S. Lend-Lease M3 Stuart light tanks. General Major of Tank Forces Vasilii M. Badanov was placed in command. It was assigned to the 6th Army and participated in the Stalingrad Defensive Operation on the Don River in July 1942, where it lost approximately two-thirds of its tanks. Its 24th Motorized Brigade conducted offensive operations along the Don together with 25th Guards Rifle Division.

After rebuilding, the corps was assigned to the 3rd Guards Army under the command of General Dmitri Danilovich Lelyushenko, to participate in encircling German Army Group A in Operation Saturn during the Battle of Stalingrad.

The 24th Tank Corps consisted of the 4th Guards Tank Brigade (Colonel G.I. Kolypov); 54th Tank Brigade (Colonel V.M. Polyakov); the 130th Tank Brigade (Colonel S.K. Nesterov); and the 24th Motor Rifle Brigade (Colonel V.S. Savchenko). Support units included the 13th Mining Engineer Company; the 158th Mobile Repair Base; and the Corps Train.

The Corps undertook the raid on Tatsinskaya during Operation Little Saturn, from 16 to 28 December 1942. It had to pull out of threatened encirclement under cover of darkness. Much of the matériel and many men were lost during the break-out, but the damage to the Germans had been done. German forces engaged in the relief of Stalingrad had to be withdrawn to deal with the raiders, and many irreplaceable transport planes of the Luftwaffe had been destroyed, with their crews and ground personnel mostly killed. The 24th Tank Corps claimed the destruction of 84 tanks, 106 guns, the killing of 12,000 Axis soldiers and the capture of almost 5,000 more in this operation. In the midst of the successful raid it was renamed the 2nd Guards Tank Corps and given the honorific 'Tatsinskaya.' It was also among the first recipients of the newly created Order of Suvorov for this operation. After the raid Badanov was promoted to General-Lieutenant.

During the year at some points the corps was assigned to the 1st Guards Army.

=== 2nd Guards Tank Corps ===
The 2nd Guards Tank Corps initially was based on the same units as the 24th Tank Corps. Its individual combat units were also renamed and renumbered as Guards units. With changing organization and equipment during the war, additional units were added. Depending on the specific tasks assigned to the Corps, units from the Reserve of the Supreme High Command (Stavka Reserve) could be added to help it achieve its mission.

At the Battle of Kursk, the following Order of Battle (OOB) applied:

Main Combat Units (totaling 187 tanks at Prokhorovka):

- 25th Guards Tank Brigade
- 26th Guards Tank Brigade
- 4th Guards Tank Brigade
- 4th Guards Motor Rifle Brigade
- 47th Guards Breakthrough Tank Regiment
- 1500th SU-regiment (Self-propelled Artillery)
- 1695th AA-regiment
- 273rd Mortar regiment
- 755th Anti-Tank Battalion

Support Units (unconfirmed)

- Aviation Liaison Section (F.A.C.)
- 51st Sapper Battalion
- Corps Train

In the remainder of 1943 the Corps fought during the Third Battle Of Kharkov; during the Battle of Prokhorovka at Kursk where it was heavily damaged; in Operation Polkovodets Rumyantsev; and at the Battle of Smolensk. On 31 August 1943 Badanov handed over to Major General of Tank Forces Alexei S. Burdeinei; Badanov was then appointed commander of the 4th Tank Army.

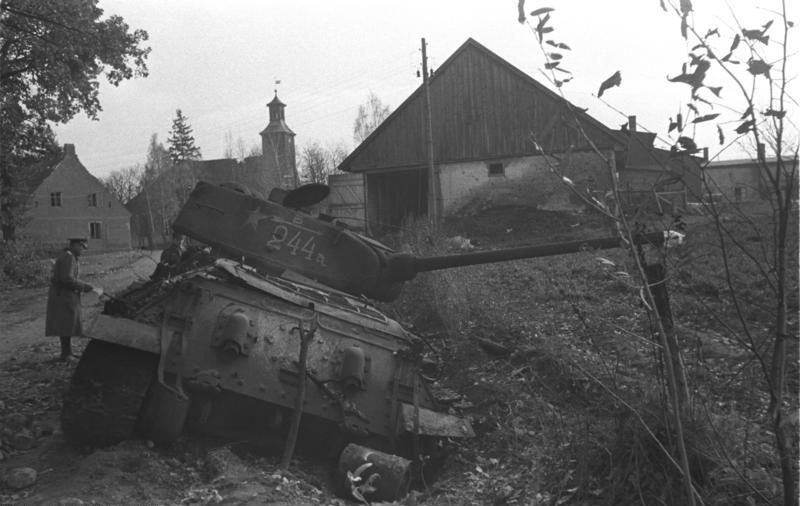
A destroyed T-34/85 of the corps' 25th Guards Tank Brigade at Nemmersdorf, October 1944

In 1944, the Corps fought at during Operation Bagration, during which, in the Minsk Offensive, the 4th Guards Tank Brigade was the first Soviet unit to enter Minsk. On 11 February 1944 corps commander Burdeinei was promoted to General-Lieutenant. Guards Sergeant Mariya Oktyabrskaya was awarded the Hero of the Soviet Union posthumously in 1945 for her actions in the fighting around Vitebsk in March 1944. The Corps then took part in the Baltic Offensive.

For the successful operations during the liberation of the capital of Belarus, the city of Minsk, the corps headquarters, as well as the 4th, 25th, 26th Guards Tank and 4th Guards Motor Rifle Brigades, by decree of the Presidium of the Supreme Soviet of the USSR of 23 July 1944, were awarded the Order of the Red Banner. The 4th Guards Tank Brigade was awarded the honorary title "Minsk."

Members of the corps committed the notorious Nemmersdorf massacre during the Gumbinnen Operation, torturing and killing tens of German civilians in October 1944.

The corps was withdrawn to the 3rd Belorussian Front reserve on 2 December 1944. It fought in the Insterburg-Königsberg Offensive, part of the East Prussian Strategic Offensive Operation. The corps was tasked with developing the offensive beginning on the morning of the second day of the Insterburg-Königsberg Offensive, without being bogged down in protracted combat with the German defenders and swiftly bypassing strongpoints, in order to capture the large highway junctions of Groß Skaisgirren and Mehlawischken highways by the end of the fourth day of the operation. The breakthrough of the corps was planned to be exploited by the 5th Army. Before the beginning of the East Prussian offensive, the corps had a strength of 187 T-34, 21 SU-76, and 21 SU-85 at 1900 on 12 January 1945. After suffering heavy losses during the offensive, the corps was withdrawn to the front reserve on 3 February, and did not return to combat again.

=== Wartime assignments ===
In 1943 the corps was assigned to the 3rd Tank Army and the 5th Guards Tank Army, and in 1944 to the 11th Guards Army and the 5th Guards Tank Army.

== Postwar ==
=== 2nd Guards Tank Division ===
On 24 July 1945, the corps became the 2nd Guards Tank Division in Pskov, part of the Leningrad Military District. In 1947, the division moved to Võru. On 23 May 1953, the 4th Guards Motor Rifle Regiment became the 122nd Guards Mechanized Regiment. The 873rd Artillery Regiment was activated from the 273rd Mortar Regiment and the separate howitzer artillery battalion. The 79th Separate Motorcycle Battalion was converted into a reconnaissance battalion. The 338th Separate Chemical Defence Company was activated on the same day. In 1953, the 1695th Anti-Aircraft Artillery Regiment was downsized into the 14th Separate Anti-Aircraft Artillery Battalion. The division also moved to Luga, Leningrad Oblast that year. In April 1955, the battalion became the 1108th Anti-Aircraft Artillery Regiment. The division underwent major reorganization in June 1957. The 25th Guards Tank Regiment was disbanded and the 26th Guards Tank Regiment became the 268th Guards Tank Regiment. The 90th Guards Heavy Tank Self-Propelled Regiment dropped the designation "Self-Propelled". The 122nd Guards Mechanized Regiment became the 272nd Guards Motor Rifle Regiment.

In 1960, the division's tank training battalion was disbanded. In 1962, the 90th Guards Heavy Tank Regiment became a regular tank regiment. On 19 February 1962, the 139th Separate Equipment Maintenance and Recovery Battalion was activated along with the 201st Separate Missile Battalion. The division was transferred to Choibalsan in Mongolia in April 1968 and became part of the 39th Army. Before the move, the 79th Separate Reconnaissance Battalion was replaced by the 86th Separate Reconnaissance Battalion. After the division arrived at Choibalsan, the 272nd Guards Motor Rifle Regiment was replaced by the 456th Motor Rifle Regiment. The 51st Separate Guards Sapper Battalion became an engineer-sapper battalion. In 1980, the motor transport battalion became the 1084th Separate Material Supply Battalion. During the mid-1980s, the division replaced its T-62 tanks with newer T-72 tanks.

Units of the division in 1988 before being reduced, included:

- Division Headquarters, Choibalsan
- 1st Independent Guards Communications Battalion
- 86th Independent Reconnaissance Battalion
- 4th Guards Tank Regiment
- 90th Guards Tank Regiment
- 268th Guards Tank Regiment
- 456th Motor Rifle Regiment
- 873rd Artillery Regiment
- 201st Independent Missile Battalion
- 1108th Anti-Aircraft Missile Regiment
- 51st Independent Guards Engineer-Sapper Battalion
- 1084th Independent Material Supply Battalion
- 139th Independent Equipment Maintenance and Recovery Battalion
- 159th Independent Medical Battalion
- 338th Chemical Defence Company

=== 1990s and twenty-first century ===
In May 1990, the division was withdrawn to Bezrechnaya, Chita Oblast, and became part of the 55th Army Corps, Siberian Military District. It was assigned the new Military Unit Number 49539. It was then downsized into the 3742nd Guards Central Tank Reserve Base in March 2001. In 2005, the base was disbanded.

On 1 December 2001 the 245th Motor Rifle Division inherited the tradition, honors and awards from the 2nd Guards Tank Division, and was renamed 245th Guards Motorised Rifle Division. The 245th Guards MRD was disbanded on 1 December 2005. The 245th Guards MRD was then reactivated on 1 February 2006 as the 6th Guards Weapons and Equipment Storage Base (Mechanised Troops) in the city of Gusinoozersk of the Republic of Buryatia.

=== As the 5th Guards Tank Brigade ===
Following the beginning of the 2008 Russian military reform, in June 2009 the "Tatinskaya" honorific was assigned again to an active organisation. The 6th Guards Weapons and Equipment Storage Base was disbanded, and the divisional battle banner, honorary name, and awards bestowed on the newly formed 5th Separate Guards Tank Brigade at Divizionnaya, Ulan Ude. Tank units and elements of the 5th Guards Tank Division were also used to form the new brigade.

The brigade has been involved in Russian interference in Ukraine since 2015 at least. It took part in fierce fighting, engaging Ukrainian tanks to encircle Debaltseve in January–February 2015. A tank gunner in the Brigade suffered horrific burns after his tank was knocked out near the village of Logvinovo. On February 16, 2016, the brigade commander, Colonel Ruslan Galitsky, was decorated on the anniversary of the Debaltsevo fighting, but then he was killed in December 2016 in Aleppo, Syria. The brigade then played a leading role in the Selenga-2016 military exercises held in August and September 2016 with the Mongolian Armed Forces.

The brigade was involved in the Kyiv offensive of the 2022 Russian invasion of Ukraine, losing some vehicles in the Battle of Ivankiv, northwest of Kyiv.
