= Badenov =

Badenov is a Russian surname and a Russian-style fictional surname, and may refer to:

- Badenov Records, the recording label of an American hip-hop performer and record producer Danny!
- Bair Badënov (born 1976), an Olympic archer for Russia
- Boris Badenov, a fictional character in the 1960s animated cartoons Rocky and His Friends and The Bullwinkle Show

See also Badanov
