= 25th Tank Division (Soviet Union) =

The 25th Tank Division of the Soviet Union's Red Army was a tank formation, active in 1941-45 on the Eastern Front of World War II, and during the Cold War.

Formed in the Moscow Military District in June 1941, the 25th Tank Division initially faced the daunting challenges of the German Operation Barbarossa. It formed part of the 13th Mechanized Corps. The division was formed from the 44th Light Tank Brigade at Gomel and was later relocated to Łapy. The division had most of the corps' tanks. Its early days were marked by intense battles, where the division experienced both setbacks and successes.

On June 22, 1941, the 13th Mechanized Corps was located within Western Front in the vicinity of Bialystok in the second echelon of Soviet troops.

== Battle of Bialystok-Minsk ==
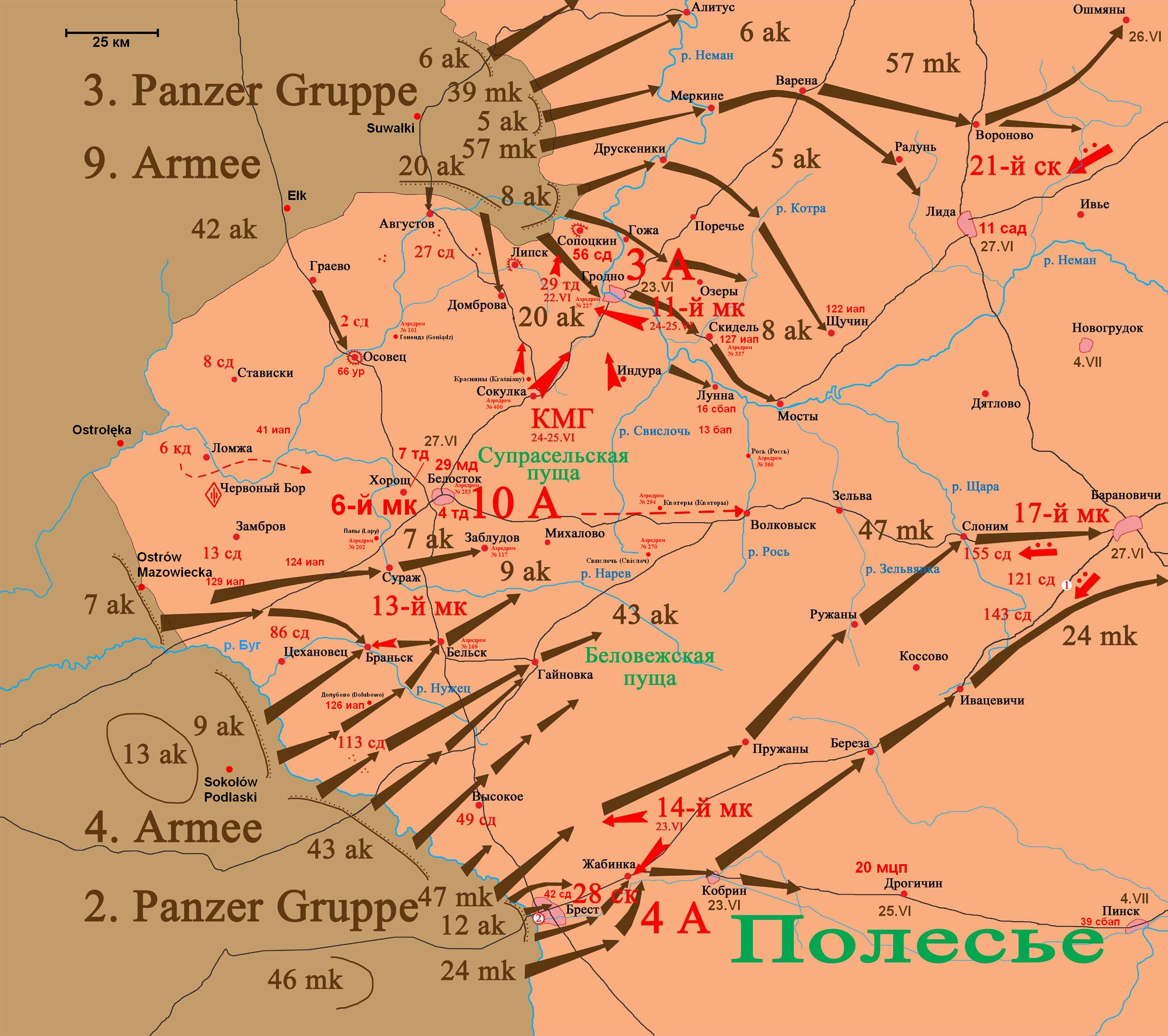
Battles on the Bialystok salient June 22-25, 1941.

From that day, the 25th Tank Division fought in the Bialystok salient.

By noon, the German 263rd Infantry Division 9th Army Corps broke through to Bransk (Bryansk), where they encountered the division's reconnaissance battalion. The corps' 18th motorcycle regiment was sent to the rescue of the scouts; his advanced detachment broke through to Bransk, but the main forces of the regiment were stopped and driven back. On July 4, 1941, the 25th Tank Division was disbanded.

== Second formation ==
As the war progressed, the 25th Tank Corps participated in pivotal battles. It operated a mix of tank models, reflecting the Soviet Union's efforts to modernize its armoured forces. Over time, advancements in tank technology influenced the division's composition, incorporating heavier tanks to meet increasing demands.

By the latter stages of the war, the 25th Tank Corps had become a seasoned and battle-hardened unit. Its experiences shaped the Soviet military's understanding of armoured warfare and contributed to the development of post-war military doctrine.

The 25th Tank Corps became a Tank Division soon after the war ended, and moved from Hungary to Eastern Germany. The division underwent further modernization, incorporating new tanks and armoured personnel carriers. From 1958-67 it was organised as a Heavy Tank Division.

In the late 1980s the division included the 175th and 162nd Tank Regiments; 335th Guards Tank Regiment; and 803rd Guards Motor Rifle Regiment. The division was stationed at Vogelsang with the 20th Guards Combined Arms Army.

The end of the Cold War saw significant transformations in the Soviet military structure, and the eventual dissolution of the Soviet Armed Forces. The 25th Tank Division was withdrawn from East Germany to Chuguev in the Ukrainian SSR from June 1989 and disbanded.
