= Aleksandr Yevteyev =

Soviet and Russian military officer (1953–2021)

- Native name: Александр Николаевич Евтеев
- Born: Aleksandr Nikolayevich Yevteyev; 22 February 1953; Volsk, Saratov Oblast, Russian SFSR, Soviet Union
- Died: 27 March 2021 (aged 68)
- Allegiance: Soviet Union; Russia
- Branch: Soviet Army; Russian Army
- Service years: 1971–2009
- Rank: General-Lieutenant
- Commands: 6th Separate Guards Motor Rifle Brigade; 10th Guards Uralsko-Lvovskaya Tank Division
- Awards: Order of Military Merit; Order "For Service to the Homeland in the Armed Forces of the USSR", Third Class; Medal of Zhukov; Medal "Veteran of the Armed Forces of the USSR"; Medal "For Impeccable Service" - First, Second and Third Classes; Order of Leon

Aleksandr Nikolayevich Yevteyev (Russian: Александр Николаевич Евтеев; 22 February 1953 – 27 March 2021) was a Soviet and later Russian military officer who held a number of posts in the Soviet Army, reaching the rank of general-lieutenant.

== Early life and career ==
Yevteyev was born on 22 February 1953 in the city of Volsk, Saratov Oblast, then part of the Russian SFSR, in the Soviet Union. He entered the Soviet Army in 1971, enrolling that year in the Omsk Higher Tank Command School, and graduating in 1975 with a specialty in combined arms command. After serving in the lower officer ranks, he rose to command positions, initially that of a platoon, and later a regiment. He undertook further studies between 1981 and 1984 at the Malinovsky Military Armoured Forces Academy, graduating with a gold medal in the specialty of command-staff, operational-tactical combined arms.

Serving with the Group of Soviet Forces in Germany during the last years of the Cold War, Yevteyev, now with the rank of lieutenant colonel, was placed in command of the 6th Separate Guards Motor Rifle Brigade in 1989. This made him head of the garrison of Soviet troops in Berlin. He was promoted to colonel during his time in command. On 15 September 1991 Yevteyev took command of the 10th Guards Uralsko-Lvovskaya Tank Division.

== Russian Army ==
With the dissolution of the Soviet Union in December 1991, Yevteyev continued to serve with the successor organisation, the Russian Army. He remained in command of the 10th Guards Tank Division until 31 May 1993, before leaving to begin studying at the Military Academy of the General Staff of the Armed Forces of Russia. He graduated in 1995, and took up a position as head of the 38th Research Testing Institute. He combined his time here with further studying, this time at the Russian Academy of State Service between 1997 and 1999, receiving the academic degree of candidate of technical sciences, as a legal specialist in state construction and law, specializing in jurisprudence. Yevteyev stepped down as head of the 38th Research Testing Institute in 2000.

Yevteyev then served in a number of senior positions in the headquarters of the Main Command of the Ground Forces, and in the Ministry of Defence. In 2002, he was appointed commander of the CIS Collective Peacekeeping Forces during the Abkhaz–Georgian conflict, holding the position until 2005. In 2008, he was appointed Chief of Staff and First Deputy Chief of Armaments of the Armed Forces, before retiring in 2009.

== Post-military service ==
In retirement Yevteyev was Deputy Governor of Tula Oblast between July 2009 and August 2011. In 2012, he became the chairman of the council of the International Public Organization "Council of Veterans of Peacekeeping Forces, Local Wars and Armed Conflicts" "Peacemaker". Yevteyev died on 27 March 2021, after a serious and prolonged illness.

He had received a number of awards and honours over his career, including the Order of Military Merit, the Order "For Service to the Homeland in the Armed Forces of the USSR" Third Class, the Medal of Zhukov, Medal "Veteran of the Armed Forces of the USSR", Medal "For Impeccable Service" First, Second and Third Classes, and the Abkhazian Order of Leon.
