= Oleg Mityaev (general) =

Russian major-general (born 1974)

- Born: 1974 (age 51–52); Orenburg, Russian SSR, Soviet Union
- Military career
- Allegiance: Russia
- Branch: Russian Ground Forces
- Rank: Lieutenant general
- Commands: 20th Guards Combined Arms Army; 150th Guards Motor Rifle Division
- Conflicts: Russo-Ukrainian War; Russian invasion of Ukraine; Siege of Mariupol

Oleg Yuryevich Mityaev (Russian: Олег Юрьевич Митяев; born c. 1974) is a Russian lieutenant general who according to Ukrainian officials was killed during the Russian invasion of Ukraine on 15 March 2022. His death, however, was not confirmed, and in December 2024, it was revealed that he is alive and still in service. Since May 2024, he is also commander of the 20th Guards Combined Arms Army.

== Biography ==
From 2013 to 2015, Mityaev was commander of the 11th Guards Air Assault Brigade. Between December 2016 and November 2018, he ran the Russian 201st Military Base in Tajikistan. He was one of the leaders of the Russian intervention in Syria. From 2020, Mityaev was the commander of Russia's 150th Motor Rifle Division.

According to Ukrainian officials, he was killed in a Ukrainian ambush while taking part in a "combat mission" (according to Russian reports) during the Siege of Mariupol at the Illich Steel and Iron Works during the Russian invasion of Ukraine, reportedly by the Azov Regiment. According to the Ukrainians, he was the fourth Russian general killed during the 2022 invasion. Western sources believe 20 major-generals were deployed to Ukraine.

On 9 December 2024, he was promoted to the rank of lieutenant general.

== See also ==
- List of Russian generals killed during the Russian invasion of Ukraine

Military offices
Preceded by Vladimir Khazretovich Elkanovs	Commander of the 150th Rifle Division; 2020-	Succeeded by Killed In Action
Unknown	Commander of the Russian 201st Military Base; 2016–2018	Unknown
Preceded by Mikhail Nikolaevich Ugolyov	Commander of the 11th Guards Air Assault Brigade; 2013–2015	Succeeded by Ruslan Leontyevich Evkodimov
