= 27th Rocket Brigade =

- Active: 1961-1991
- Country: Soviet Union
- Branch: Soviet Army
- Type: Tactical Ballistic Missile Brigade
- Engagements: Operation Danube

Commanders
- Notable commanders: Mykhailo Podust

The 27th Rocket Brigade was a tactical ballistic missile brigade of the Soviet Army from 1961 to 1991. It served with the Group of Soviet Forces in Germany's 20th Guards Army between 1966 and 1991. After it withdrew from Germany, the brigade was sent to Tsel in the Belorussian Military District, where it was disbanded.

== History ==
The 27th Missile Brigade was formed on 20 February 1961 in Bila Tserkva with the 1st Guards Army. It was equipped with R-11 Zemlya and R-17 Elbrus Scud missiles. In 1966, the brigade moved to Rüdersdorf and became part of the 20th Guards Army. It included the 439th, 452nd and 540th Separate Missile Battalions, as well as a technical battery. The 452nd was based at Jüterbog. When the brigade moved to East Germany in 1966, the 439th was sent to Eberswalde and the 540th to Rüdersdorf. In 1968, the 439th Battalion moved to Rüdersdorf. Brigade headquarters moved to Jüterbog in 1980. The 540th Battalion moved to Jüterbog in 1987. At this point the entire brigade was stationed in Jüterbog. In June 1991, the brigade was pulled out of Germany and sent to Tsel, in the Belorussian Military District. It was disbanded there soon afterwards.
