= Mikhail Fomichyov =

Soviet tank officer in WWII

Mikhail Georgievich Fomichyov
- Михаил Георгиевич Фомичёв
- Born: 8 October [O.S. 25 September] 1911; Sloboda, Likhvinsky Uyezd, Kaluga Governorate, Russian Empire
- Died: 18 November 1987 (aged 76); Moscow, Russian SFSR, Soviet Union
- Military career
- Allegiance: Soviet Union
- Branch: Red Army
- Service years: 1933–1972
- Rank: General-lieutenant
- Conflicts: World War II
- Awards: Hero of the Soviet Union (twice)

Mikhail Georgievich Fomichyov (Russian: Михаи́л Гео́ргиевич Фомичёв; 8 October [O.S. 25 September] 1911 – 18 November 1987) was a tank officer during World War II who was twice awarded the title Hero of the Soviet Union.

== Early life ==
Born on 8 October [O.S. 25 September] 1911 in the rural village of Sloboda in the Likhvinsky Uyezd of Kaluga Governorate to a Russian peasant family, he had very little schooling before starting to work in agriculture to help his family. In 1930 he became a tractor driver on a state farm. After entering the military in December 1933 he graduated from training for the 3rd Tank Regiment in 1934, then the M.V.Frunze Armored School in Oryol in 1937, after which he commanded a training platoon at the school. For showing himself to be a good commander he was recommended to attend the Stalin Military Academy of Mechanization and Motorization of the Red Army. Upon graduation in May 1941, he became the senior adjutant of the 85th Tank Regiment of the 43rd Tank Division.

== World War II ==
Fomichyov was a participant in the defense of the Soviet Union on the Southwestern Front from the early days of the war, seeing combat in the Battle of Brody. After leaving encirclement in late September he became the deputy chief of staff for operations of the 12th Tank Brigade, participating in the First Battle of Kharkov as well as the Barvenkovo–Lozovaya Offensive before he was seriously wounded in the Second Battle of Kharkov. After recovering he returned to the brigade on the Stalingrad front. However, the commander of the brigade became badly shell-shocked September, so Fomichyev served as acting commander and was promoted to lieutenant colonel. He did not remain there much longer since the unit was soon withdrawn from the front and disbanded, so in December he became the senior assistant to the chief of the 2nd Division of the 3rd Directorate of the Main Intelligence Directorate of the General Staff of the Red Army, but in that position be repeatedly requested to be sent back to the warfront. His request to be sent to the front was supported, and in July 1943 he was made deputy commander of the 244th Tank Brigade. There he participated in Operation Kutuzov before being made chief of staff of the 30th Tank Corps, which was soon renamed as the 10th Guards Ural Tank Corps. In that position he participated in the battles for the Bryansk and parts of Ukraine. In February 1944 he became commander of the 63rd Guards Tank Brigade, which he commanded for the rest of the war. There he gained his reputation as a successful tank commander and earned both gold stars. During the Lvov–Sandomierz Offensive his brigade broke through the line of German defenses and advanced deep into enemy-controlled territory, gaining a foothold in Lviv and maintaining it for six days before more troops arrived. For his role in taking back Lviv he was awarded the title Hero of the Soviet Union on 23 September 1944. He was awarded the title for a second time after the end of the war for his brigade's role in the Vistula-Oder, Berlin, and Prague operations, since his tanks were the first to reach the Oder.

== Later life ==
Shortly after the war he was promoted to the rank of major general, and in 1948 he graduated from the Military Academy of General Staff, after which he commanded the 7th Mechanized Division in China. From July 1952 to February 1953 he was the deputy chief of staff of the 8th Mechanized Army, after which he transferred to the 13th Army where he was the head of mechanized forces. In January 1954 he became the assistant commander for tank weapons of the unit, and in September he was promoted to the head of the headquarters combat training department. In 1955 he took command of the 27th Rifle Corps, and the next year he commanded the 40th Rifle Corps. Having been promoted to lieutenant-general in 1958, he became the commander of the 28th Combined Arms Army in 1960. He remained there for almost two years, becoming the deputy commander of the Trans-Baikal Military District in September 1962, where he remained until becoming the inspector-general of combined arms formations of the Main Inspectorate of the Ministry of Defense. After retiring in 1972 he lived in Moscow, where he died on 18 November 1987 and was buried in the Kuntsevo Cemetery.

== Awards ==
- Twice Hero of the Soviet Union (23 September 1944 and 31 May 1945)
- Order of Lenin (23 September 1944)
- Two Order of the Red Banner (30 April 1945 and 22 February 1968)
- Order of Suvorov 2nd class (6 April 1945)
- Order of Kutuzov 2nd class (29 May 1944)
- Order of the Patriotic War 1st class (11 March 1985)
- Three Order of the Red Star (13 February 1942, 20 June 1949, and 6 October 1981)
- campaign and jubilee medals
