= 20th Guards Combined Arms Army =

Russian Ground Forces formation

20th Guards Combined Arms Army (1960–) 4th Guards Mechanized Army (1946–1960) 4th Guards Tank Army (1945–1946) 4th Tank Army (1942–1945)
- Active: 1942–present
- Country: Soviet Union (1942–1991); Russia (1991–)
- Branch: Red Army (1942–1945); Soviet Ground Forces (1945-1991); Russian Ground Forces (1991–present)
- Type: Armoured
- Size: currently 2 motor rifle divisions, 2 artillery/missile brigades + several other auxiliary regiments
- Part of: Moscow Military District (1992–2010); Western Military District (2010–2024); Moscow Military District (2024–)
- Garrison/HQ: Voronezh
- Engagements: World War II Russian invasion of Ukraine: Battle of Lyman (September–October 2022); Luhansk Oblast campaign; Kupiansk offensive; 2023 Ukrainian counteroffensive
- Battle honours: Guards

Commanders
- Current commander: Lieutenant General Oleg Mityaev
- Notable commanders: Vasily Badanov; Dmitry Lelyushenko

The 20th Guards Combined Arms Army (originally designated as the 4th Tank Army, 4th Guards Tank Army in 1945, 4th Guards Mechanised Army in 1946, and the 20th Guards Army in 1960 within the Soviet Ground Forces) is a field army. In 1991, after the dissolution of the Soviet Union, the army became part of the Russian Ground Forces. MUN в/ч 89425.

== 1st formation (4th Tank Army) ==
The army was first formed by Stavka order within Stalingrad Front on July 22, 1942, based on the remaining elements of the headquarters of the former 28th Army, which had been largely destroyed in recent fighting. Major General Vasily Kryuchenkin, commander of the former 28th Army, was given command of 4th Tank Army. The new formation incorporated the 22nd Tank Corps, under Major General Aleksandr Shamshin, and Major General Abram Khasin's 23rd Tank Corps, plus three rifle divisions transferred from the Far Eastern Front, two anti-tank regiments and two anti-aircraft regiments. 8th Separate Fighter Air Brigade provided support.

It was committed to battle without being fully formed, as German forces had broken through. The Army attempted to stop the German 6th Army, but was not successful and lost a large number of tanks. On 1 August 1942 official Soviet records show the Army as comprising the 22nd Tank Corps (133rd, 173rd, 176th, and 182nd Tank Brigades plus the 22nd Motor Rifle Brigade), the 18th and 205th Rifle Divisions, an independent brigade, and two artillery regiments. In August 1942 it fought on the southern approaches to Stalingrad, having conducted some successful counterattacks against units of the German 48th Panzer Corps.

4th Tank Army later came under command of General Konstantin Rokossovsky's Don Front. On 22 October Kryuchenkin was replaced by General Pavel Batov. The much diminished army was re-designated the 65th Army on 27 October, and served for the duration under Batov's command.

== 2nd formation (4th Guards Tank Army) ==
On 15 July 1943, after an abortive attempt to form the Army for a second time had been called off in February, it was reformed as 4th Guards Tank Army drawing on the headquarters of the previous 19th Cavalry Corps. Initially the new army consisted of 11th and 30th Ural Volunteer Tank Corps and 6th Guards Mechanised Corps.

Its first operation as 4th Tank Army, under Lt. General Tank Tr. Vasily Badanov, (July 1943 – March 1944) was at Orel, the counterattack (Operation Kutuzov) on the northern side of the Kursk bulge after the German defeat at the Battle of Kursk proper. John Erickson wrote that "at 1100 on 26 July, two of Badanov's corps (11th Tank and 6th Guards Mechanised) put in a ragged attack towards Bolkhov. For the next few hours, under the very gaze of Ivan Bagramyan [commander of 11th Guards Army, whose sector 4th Tank was attacking through] and Badanov, both corps were heavily battered by the concealed German tanks and assault guns." It took part in the winter battles in Ukraine in 1944 (Proskurov-Chernovitsy), then the Lvov–Sandomierz Operation in the summer. Its commander was Lt. Gen. (later Col. Gen.) Dmitry Lelyushenko (March 1944 – May 1945). It then participated in the Lower Silesian, Upper Silesian, Berlin, and Prague operations. In the last days of the war, it achieved Guards status by an order of the NKO dated 17 March 1945 (Krasnaya Zvezda).

== Cold War ==
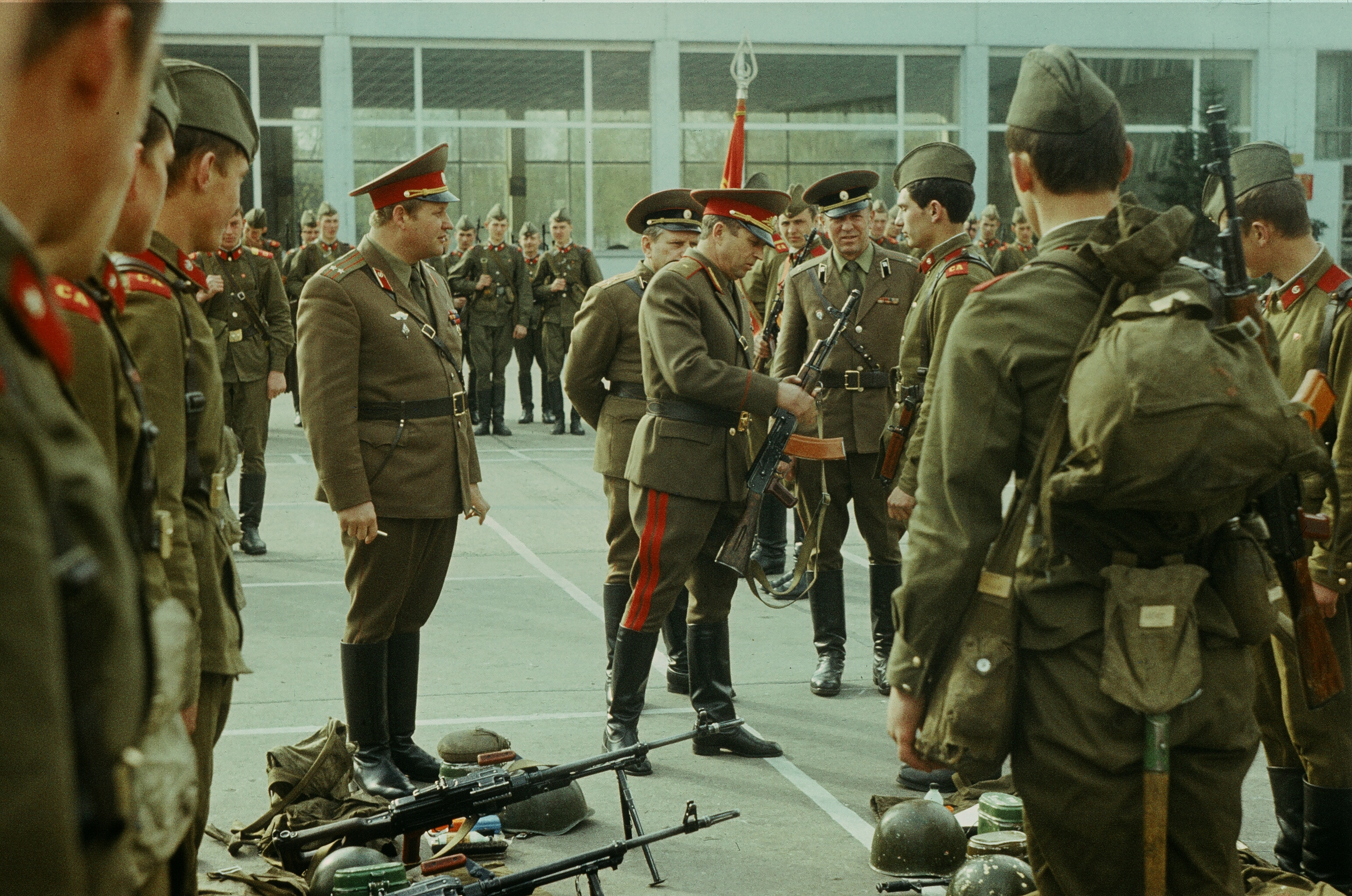
in Berlin, 1981

It was initially part of the Central Group of Forces, but in 1947 was moved to eastern Germany. In the first days of the Soviet occupation of eastern Germany, it had its headquarters at Eberswalde and consisted of the 5th and 6th Guards Mechanised Corps and the 10th Guards Tank Corps.

From 1946 to 1957 the Army was named 4th Guards Mechanised Army. It was renamed 20th Guards Army in 1960, and served for many years as part of the Group of Soviet Forces in Germany. It took part in the Soviet invasion of Czechoslovakia in 1968. In 1982 the 14th Guards Motor Rifle Division became the 32nd Guards Tank Division, and two motor rifle regiments became tank regiments. In 1985 the former 6th Guards Motor Rifle Division became the 90th Guards Tank Division. In the late 1980s it controlled the 25th Tank Division (Soviet Union) (HQ Vogelsang, disbanded 1989), 32nd Guards Tank Division (HQ Jüterbog, disbanded 1989), 90th Guards Tank Division (HQ Bernau, withdrawn to Chernorech'e in the Volga Military District, early 1990s), the 35th Motor Rifle Division (HQ Krampnitz, withdrawn to Chebarkul and disbanded, December 1991 – April 1992), the 6th Guards Separate Motor Rifle Brigade at Berlin-Karlshorst (withdrawn to Kursk) and many combat support and service support units, including the 387th Guards Artillery Brigade, 27th and 464th Rocket Brigades, a SAM brigade, an engineer-sapper brigade, and two helicopter regiments. After the fall of the Soviet Union 20th Guards Army was withdrawn to Voronezh in the Moscow Military District.

== Post Cold War ==
In June 2006 elements of the Army took part in the "Shield of Union" joint Russian–Belarusian exercises. From 2009 to 2014 the 6th Separate Czestochowa Tank Brigade at Mulino was part of the army. In 2014 it transferred to the 1st Guards Tank Army. In mid-August 2016, Major General Yevgeny Nikiforov became the army commander. 68th Army Corps commander Major General Alexander Peryazev took command in February 2017 as Nikiforov transferred to the 58th Army.

== Russian invasion of Ukraine ==
In January 2025, Forbes reported that the 20th Combined Arms Army had formed assault groups made up of injured men, including wounded soldiers walking with crutches, and sent them into battle during the Russian invasion of Ukraine.

== Units subservient to 20th Army ==
- 3rd Motor Rifle Division (в/ч 54046) (Boguchar)
  - 752nd Motor Rifle Regiment (в/ч 34670)
  - 252nd Motor Rifle Regiment (в/ч 91711)
  - 237th Guards Tank Regiment (в/ч 91726)
  - 84th Reconnaissance Battalion (в/ч 22263)
  - 99th Self-Propelled Artillery Regiment (в/ч 91727)
  - 159th Separate Anti-Tank Battalion (в/ч 81989)
  - 1143rd Separate Anti-Aircraft Missile Battalion (в/ч 48422)
- 144th Guards Motor Rifle Division (в/ч 23060) (Yelnya)
  - 254th Guards Motor Rifle Regiment (в/ч 91704)
  - 488th Guards Motor Rifle Regiment (в/ч 12721)
  - 59th Guards Tank Regiment (в/ч 94018)
  - 148th Reconnaissance Battalion (в/ч 23872)
  - 856th Guards Self-Propelled Artillery Regiment (в/ч 23857)
  - 1259th Separate Anti-Tank Artillery Battalion
  - 673rd Separate Anti-Aircraft Missile Battalion (в/ч 53821)
- 236th Guards Artillery Brigade (в/ч 53195) (Kolomna)
- 448th Rocket Brigade (в/ч 35535) (Kursk)
- 53rd Guards Anti-Aircraft Missile Brigade (в/ч 32406) (Kursk)
- 99th Weapons and Equipment Storage Base (Tver)
- 7015th Weapons and Equipment Storage Base (Mulino)
- 152nd Logistic Support Brigade (Liski)
- 9th Guards Command Brigade (Voronezh)
- Battalion of the 82nd Separate Warsaw Radio Engineering Special Purpose Brigade

== Commanders ==
The following officers have commanded the army:

Rank	Name	Start	End	References
Major General	Vasily Kryuchenkin	22 July 1942	20 October 1942	
Colonel General	Pavel Batov	22 October 1942	27 October 1942	
Lieutenant General	Vasily Badanov	15 July 1943	29 March 1944	
Colonel General	Dmitry Lelyushenko	29 March 1944	30 August 1947	
Lieutenant General	Viktor Obukhov	30 August 1947	15 December 1951	
Major General	Pyotr Kalininchenko	15 December 1951	11 May 1953	
Lieutenant General	Vladimir Komarov	11 May 1953	10 January 1955	
Major General (promoted to Lieutenant General 8 August 1955)	Vladimir Chizh	10 January 1955	22 January 1960	
Major General (promoted to Lieutenant General 27 April 1962)	Viktor Kotov	22 January 1960	9 December 1964	
Major General (promoted to Lieutenant General 7 May 1966)	Mikhail Khomulo	9 December 1964	12 May 1968	
Lieutenant General	Ivan Velichko	12 May 1968	12 May 1970	
Major General (promoted to Lieutenant General 8 November 1971)	Nikolay Lapygin	12 May 1970	19 October 1972	
Lieutenant General	Vladimir Sivenok	6 December 1972	7 July 1975	
Major General (promoted to Lieutenant General 14 February 1977)	Vladimir Arkhipov	7 July 1975	17 April 1979	
Major General (promoted to Lieutenant General 25 October 1979)	Ivan Chelombeyev	17 April 1979	December 1981	
Major General (promoted to Lieutenant General 5 November 1985)	Albert Makashov	9 January 1982	January 1986	
Major General (promoted to Lieutenant General 16 February 1988)	Alexander Chumakov	January 1986	April 1988	
Major General (promoted to Lieutenant General 18 December 1991)	Mikhail Arkhipov	April 1988	22 December 1991	
Lieutenant General	Nikolay Pugachyov	23 December 1991	28 June 1993	
Major General	Alexey Nefyodov	29 June 1993	1994	
Lieutenant General	Vladimir Chuzhikov	1994	2000	
Major General	Sergey Makarov	2000	August 2002	
Lieutenant General	Alexander Postnikov-Streltsov	August 2002	November 2004	
Lieutenant General	Andrey Ivanayev	May 2018	December 2022	
Major General	Sukhrab Akhmedov	2023	May 2024	
Lieutenant General	Oleg Mityaev	May 2024	present	

== References and sources ==
=== Bibliography ===
- Keith E. Bonn (ed.), Slaughterhouse: The Handbook of the Eastern Front, Aberjona Press, 2005, p. 334
- see also (Ru) http://polk69wunsdorf.narod.ru/simple11.html
- Feskov, V.I.; Golikov, V.I.; Kalashnikov, K.A.; Slugin, S.A. (2013). Вооруженные силы СССР после Второй Мировой войны: от Красной Армии к Советской [The Armed Forces of the USSR after World War II: From the Red Army to the Soviet: Part 1 Land Forces] (in Russian). Tomsk: Scientific and Technical Literature Publishing. ISBN 9785895035306.
- Glantz, David M. 'Companion to Colossus Reborn' Univ. Press of Kansas, 2005.
