= Vogelsang, Zehdenick =

Coordinates: 53.0336°N 13.3908°E

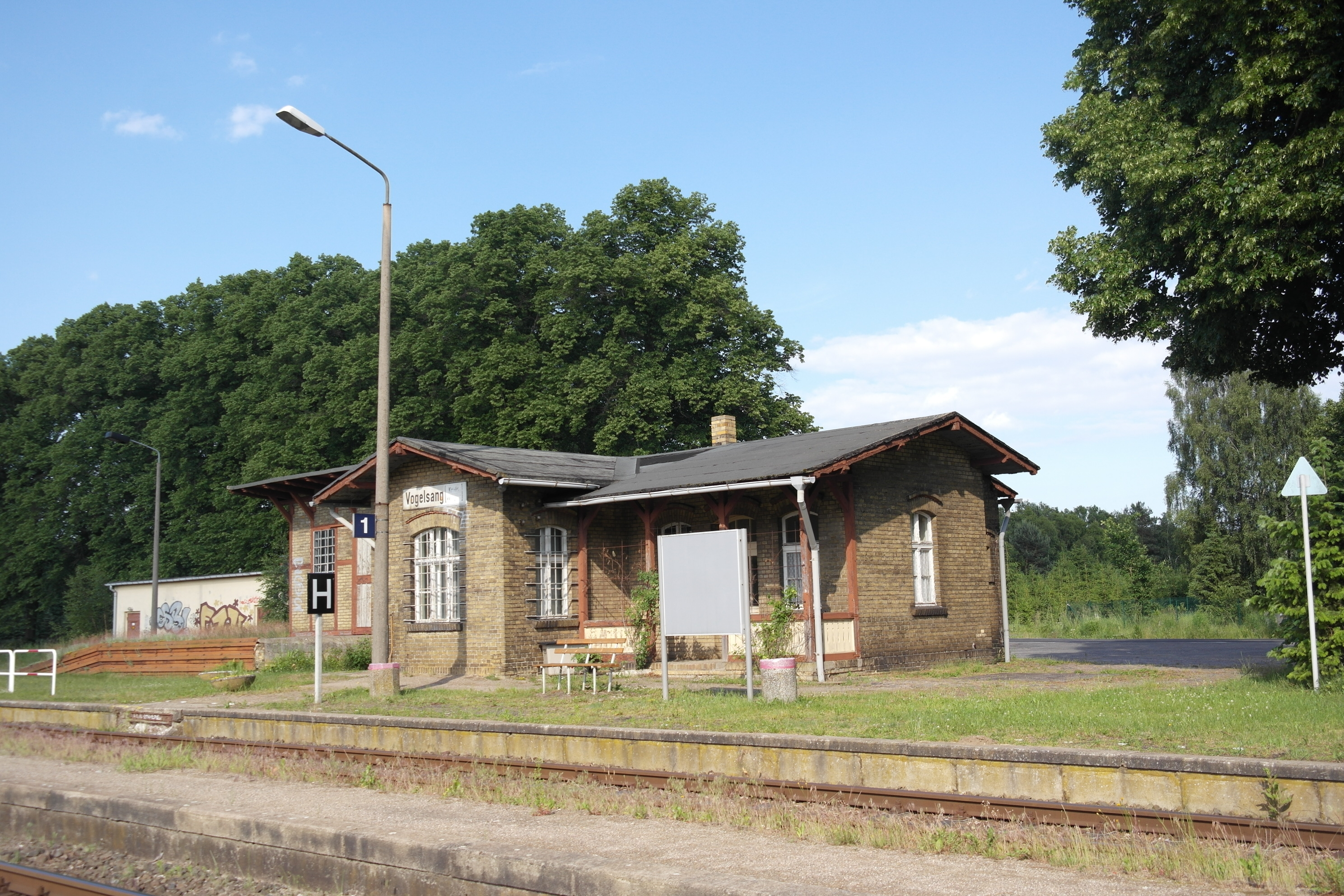
Vogelsang Railway Station

Vogelsang is a village, one of the thirteen districts of the city of Zehdenick in the Oberhavel district, in Brandenburg, Germany.

== Geography ==
Vogelsang is located in the northeast of Zehdenick. To the south lies the district of Wesendorf, west Zehdenick and hillfort. In the East Vogelsang borders Templin in Uckermark.

== History ==
Founded in the 18th century, in 1882 Vogelsang was added to the state forest Gutsbezirk Zehdenick. The local people have always lived from the forest, and felled timber products. Forestry work continues today, while the former mill has been converted into a factory.

In 1888 a railway station was built at the Löwenberg-Prenzlau Railway. In December 2001, the village was annexed as part of Zehdenick.

== Soviet military base ==
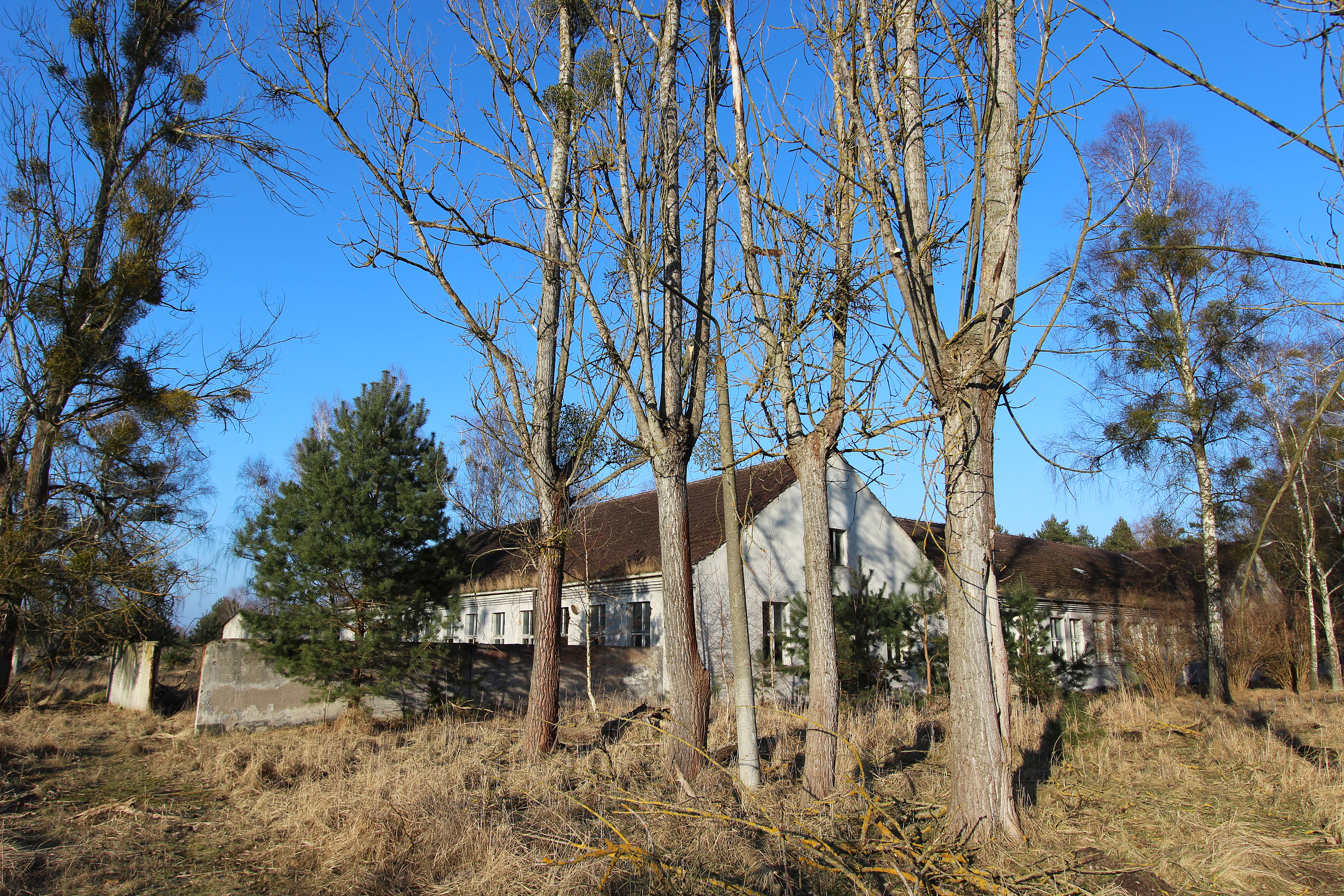
Abandoned buildings in Vogelsang, 2015

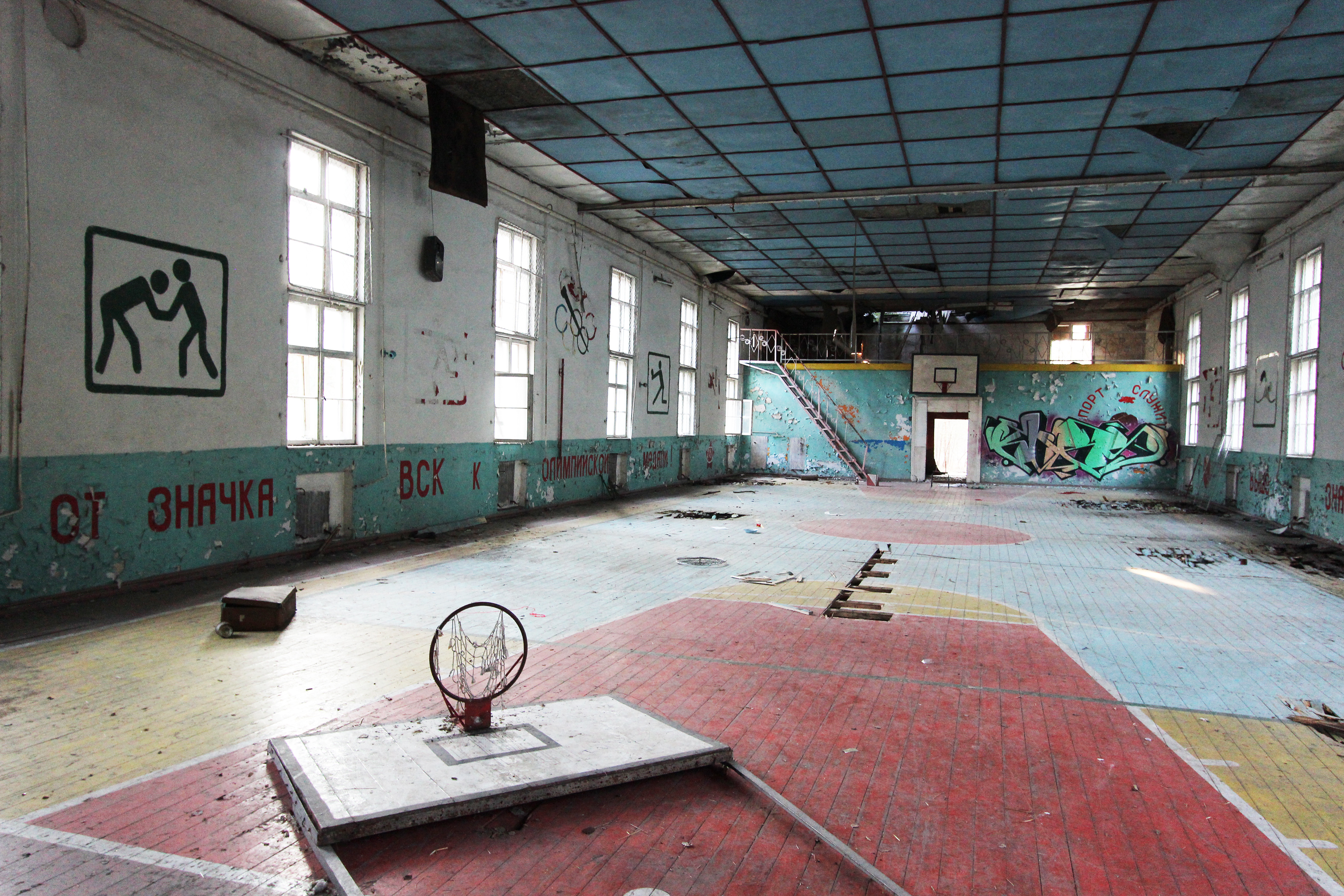
Former sports hall in 2015

After the end of World War II, a site north of the village became important within the Group of Soviet Forces in Germany. From 1952, a military townlet (barracks town) was constructed within the woods, that eventually was capable of housing 15,000 people, including military personnel and their families. The town was self-contained and off-limits to non-essential personnel, and contained a theatre, shops, offices, a gym, school and medical facilities. During the Cold War, it was the third largest Soviet base inside East Germany, after the base at Wünsdorf.

Forces stationed at the base included the 25th Tank Division and its 162nd Tank and 803rd Motor Rifle Regiments. But the most important were the 1702nd Anti-aircraft missile regiment. In early 1959, three years before the Cuban Missile Crisis, they were equipped with twelve of the R-5 Pobeda nuclear missiles, capable of being launched from a mobile launcher placed in one of the four tennis-court sized sites already outfitted to handle the larger R-12 Dvina. Other similar sites were set up at Fürstenberg/Havel (four pads), and Lychen (one pad).

Soviet military records state that the R-5 were withdrawn in August 1959. But records obtained after the fall of East Germany, and the release of records from the CIA, British Military Intelligence and French Military Intelligence, suggest that they could have been in residence until a period after the Cuban Missile crisis ended, probably until the R-5 was retired in 1967. These records show that much as though the site itself remained largely covered and unknown thanks to the forestry cover, Western military intelligence authorities had become aware of the movement by rail of large boxes capable of holding an R-5 missile in early 1959.

From the early 1960s, the site became the headquarters of the 25th Tank Division.

With the withdrawal of Russian Army troops in 1994, the military townlet was partly demolished, with the remainder allowed to decay back into the woods. Due to the many ammunition residues in the soil, access to parts of the site is restricted, as the cordoned areas can be life-threatening.
