= 6th Separate Guards Motor Rifle Brigade =

6th Guards Motor Rifle Regiment (1997–2009) 6th Separate Guards Motor Rifle Brigade (1982–1997) 6th Separate Motor Rifle Brigade (1962–1982)
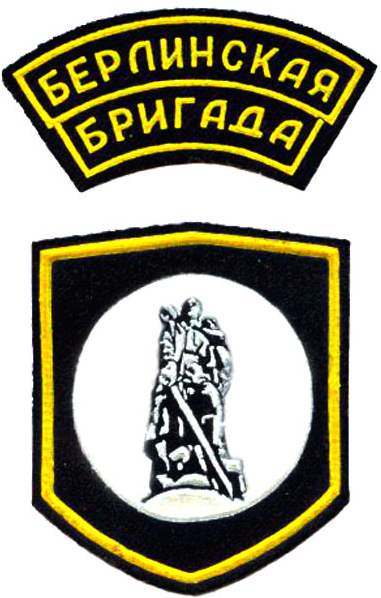
- Post-Soviet brigade insignia, it is of the Soviet War Memorial (Treptower Park)
- Active: 1962–2009
- Country: Soviet Union; Russia
- Branch: Soviet Army; Russian Ground Forces
- Part of: Group of Soviet Forces in Germany (later Western Group of Forces); 10th Guards Tank Division
- Garrison/HQ: Karlshorst; Kursk
- Engagements: First Chechen War; Second Chechen War
- Decorations: Order of Bogdan Khmelnitsky 2nd class
- Battle honours: Berlin

Commanders
- Notable commanders: Nikolai Sergeyev; Alexander Dorofeyev; Sergei Gushchin; Aleksandr Yevteyev

The 6th Separate Guards Motor Rifle Brigade (Russian: 6-я отдельная гвардейская мотострелковая бригада) was a Soviet Army mechanized infantry brigade, stationed in East Berlin during the Cold War, from 1962 to 1989.

Formed in 1962 as the 6th Separate Brigade of Protection after the Berlin Crisis of the previous year increased tensions, the unit was soon renamed the 6th Separate Motor Rifle Brigade. Directly subordinated to the Group of Soviet Forces in Germany (GSFG), the brigade helped protect East Berlin and provided troops for ceremonial duties in the city. In event of a conflict, the brigade was to invade West Berlin, with the help of National People's Army units stationed in and around Berlin. In 1982, the brigade inherited the lineage of the 60th Guards Rifle Division's 185th Guards Rifle Regiment, and became an elite Guards unit, also receiving the honorifics "Berlin Order of Bogdan Khmelnitsky". The brigade was the last Soviet Army unit to leave Germany after its reunification, in 1994, and was withdrawn to Kursk, where it became a motor rifle regiment of the 10th Guards Tank Division in 1997. Fighting in both the First and the Second Chechen War, the unit was disbanded in 2009.

== History ==
=== Cold War ===
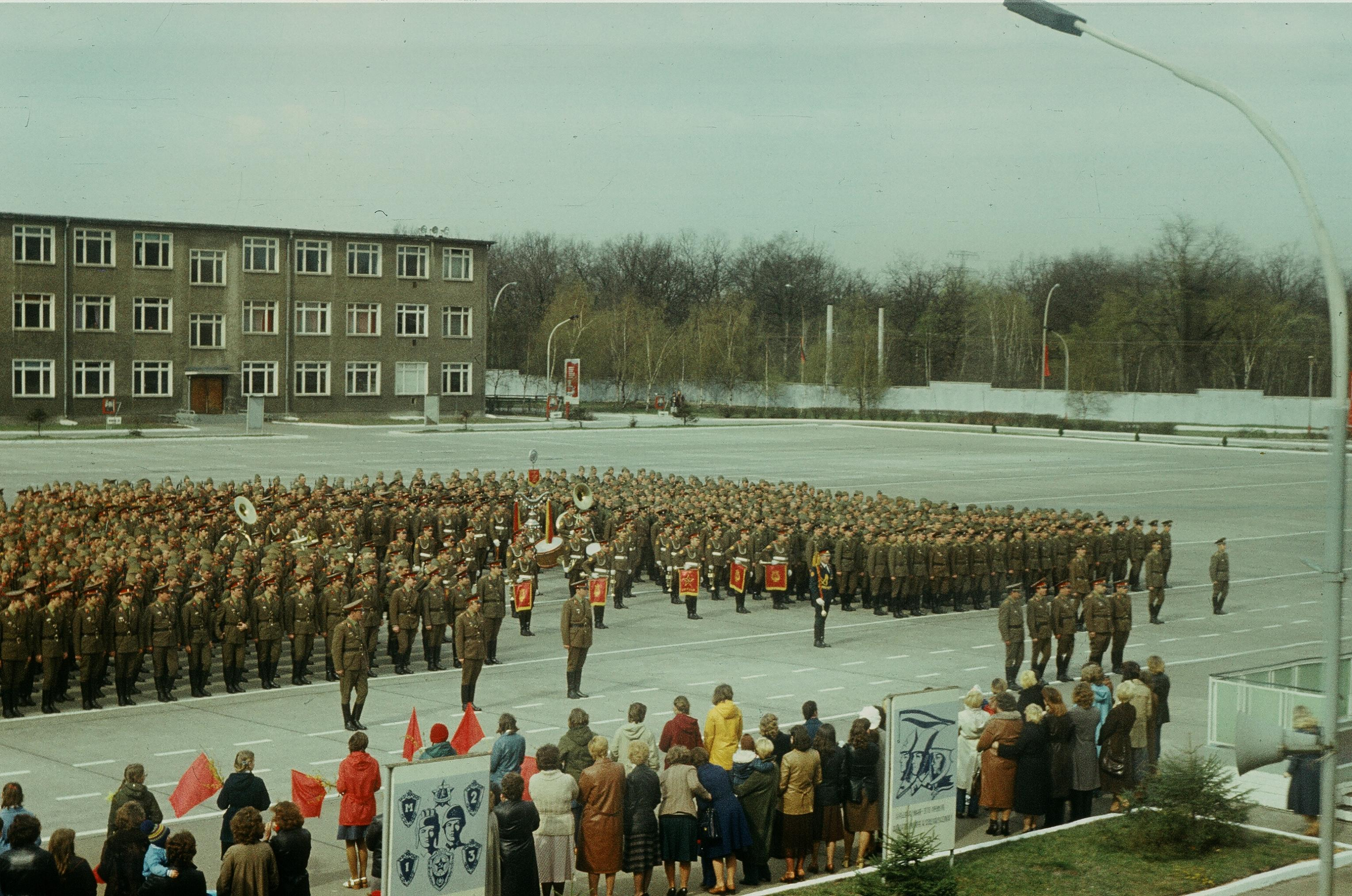
Members of the brigade in East Germany.

After the August 1961 Berlin Crisis escalated tensions between the West and the Soviet Union, the GSFG command formed the 6th Separate Brigade of Protection on 20 August 1962 from the headquarters of the commandant of the garrison of Soviet troops in Berlin, in order to provide a permanent Soviet presence in the city that could, in the event of a war, quickly and effectively neutralize the NATO forces in West Berlin.

Colonel Ivan Kirillov, commander of the 6th Guards Motor Rifle Division's 81st Guards Motor Rifle Regiment, which had been deployed into the city during the crisis, became the new brigade's commander. The brigade initially included four separate motor rifle battalions: the 133rd, 154th, 162nd, and the 178th, all formed from commandant's battalions that had been stationed in the city since the beginning of the Cold War.

The 133rd Battalion, formed in 1945, was tasked with providing ceremonial guards for the Soviet War Memorial in the Tiergarten and Spandau Prison, both of which were located in the British sector of the city in West Berlin. The 162nd Battalion provided security on the Soviet sides of the three vehicle and three rail checkpoints that controlled movement between the two sections of the city. These functions were performed by its three motor rifle companies based near the checkpoints. On 19 November, the brigade was redesignated as the 6th Separate Motor Rifle Brigade.

=== Service in the Russian Ground Forces ===
On 31 August 1994, the brigade was withdrawn from Berlin to Kursk, where a military camp named after Georgy Zhukov was built as its base. On 23 September, the 53rd and 54th Separate Tank Battalions were disbanded. 700 soldiers and more than 100 officers and NCOs from the brigade fought in the First Chechen War, suffering casualties of 30 killed and over 50 wounded. By 1997, the 6th Brigade included the 154th, 178th, 524th, and 525th Separate Motor Rifle Battalions, the 65th Separate Tank Battalion, the 79th and 83rd Separate Self-Propelled Howitzer Artillery Battalions, the 90th Separate Anti-Aircraft Rocket Battalion, the 93rd Separate Anti-Aircraft Rocket Artillery Battalion, and the 89th Separate Anti-Tank Artillery Battalion. In accordance with an order from 25 August 1997, the brigade was downsized into the 6th Guards Motor Rifle Regiment, part of the 10th Guards Tank Division. In February 2009, the regiment was disbanded.

== See also ==
- Berlin Brigade - US Military presence in Berlin.
- French Forces in Berlin - French Military presence in Berlin.
- Berlin Infantry Brigade - British Military presence in Berlin.
