= 10th Guards Uralsko-Lvovskaya Tank Division =

Tank division of the Soviet military

30th Urals Volunteer Tank Corps (1943) 10th Guards Tank Corps (1943–1945) 10th Guards Tank Division (1945–2009) 10th Separate Guards Tank Brigade (2009–)
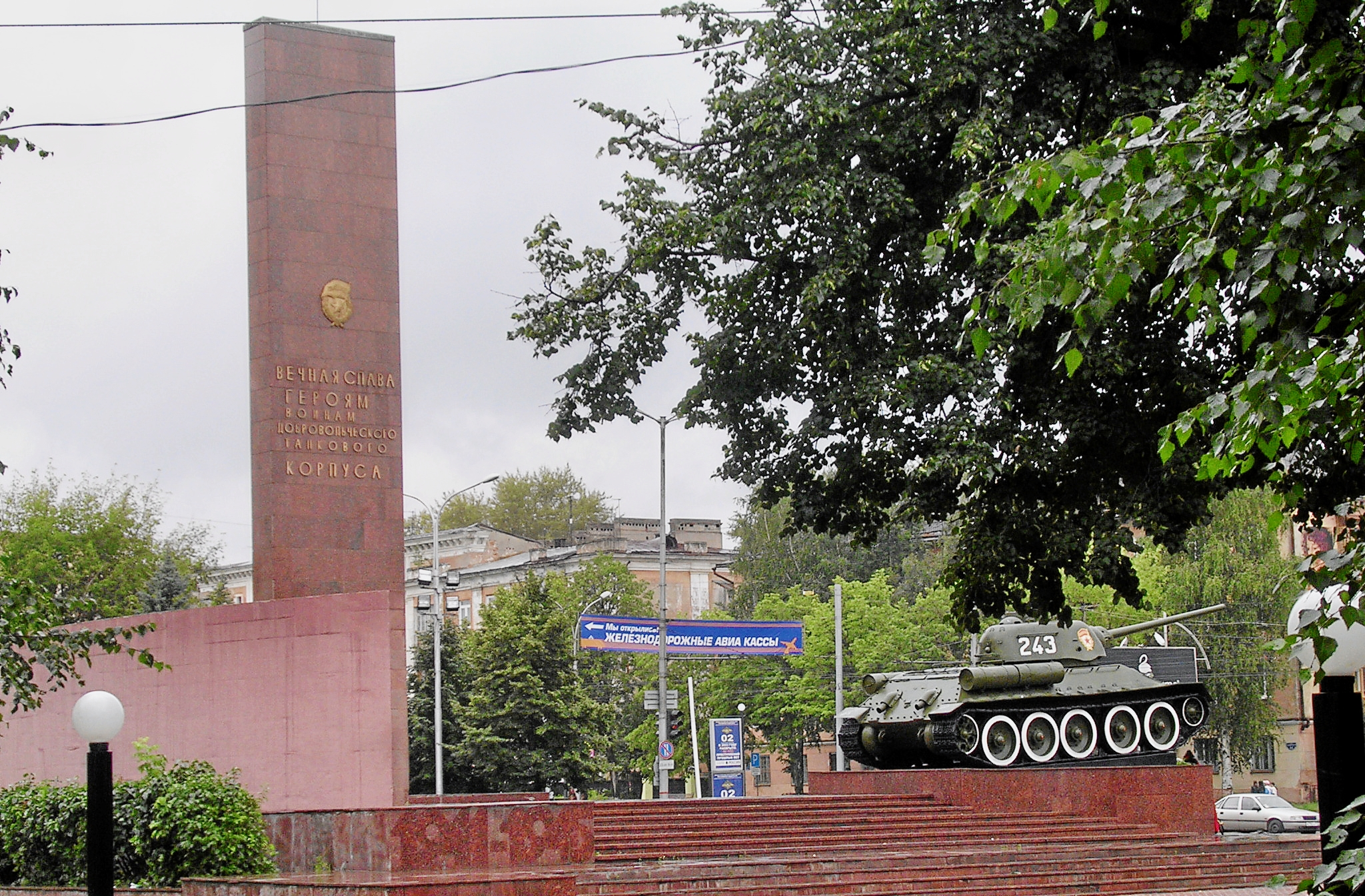
- Ural Volunteer Tank Division Memorial in Perm
- Active: 1943–2009
- Country: Russia
- Branch: Regular Army
- Type: Tank
- Size: Around 3,000 – 4,000 personnel (1990s)
- Garrison/HQ: Boguchar, Voronezh Oblast
- Nicknames: Ural Volunteer, Lvov
- Engagements: World War II; East German uprising of 1953

Commanders
- Notable commanders: Yevtikhy Belov; Mikhail Fomichev; Semyon Kurkotkin; Gennady Troshev; Aleksandr Yevteyev

The 10th Guards Uralsko-Lvovskaya Volunteer Tank Division, also known as the Ural-Lvov Tank Division, is a tank division of the Russian Ground Forces and part of the Moscow Military District's 20th Guards Army. The division traces its heritage back to 1943, during World War II. It is headquartered and based at Boguchar, 160 kilometres south of Voronezh, Voronezh Oblast.

Its complete formal designation is: "The 10th Guards Tank Ural-L'vov the Order of October Revolution Red Banner, the Order of Suvorov and the Order of Kutuzov Volunteer division in the name of Marshal of the Soviet Union R.A. Malinovsky" (Russian: 10 гвардейская танковая Уральско-Львовская ордена Октябрьской революции Краснознаменная орденов Суворова и Кутузова добровольческая дивизия имени Маршала Советского Союза Р. А. Малиновского).

Reports indicate that the Division has been reduced in status to a mobilisable base for the storage of weapons and equipment, (which in wartime would become a tank brigade), during the 2009 Russian Ground Forces reorganisation.

== World War II ==
10th Guards Tank Corps tactical sign

The people of the Ural districts took the initiative to create the Urals voluntary tank corps which became an elite formation. Three tank brigades (including one from Perm) and one motor-rifle brigade and other military units were included in its structure. Colonel Vadim Sokolov oversaw the formation of the unit. On 28 March 1943, Major General Georgy Rodin took command. The formation was initially known as the 30th Uralsky Voluntary Tank Corps and was formed in April 1943 in the Ural Military District. Workers from the Ural tank factories were among its initial recruits. The Corps has the distinction of being entirely paid-for by the donations of the population of the Urals. This included its entire complement of T-34 tanks built by the Urals factories. 23 March 1943 is considered the "birthday" of the 243rd Perm Tank Brigade. On 1 June 1943, units of the corps were despatched to the front line for the first time.

The first action for the Urals Volunteer Tank Corps was at Oryol, the counterattack (Operation Kutuzov) on the northern side of the Kursk salient after the German defeat at the Battle of Kursk proper. Historian John Erickson wrote that, following a 'ragged' attack by 11th Tank and 6th Guards Mechanised Corps by 4th Tank Army on 26 July 1943, during which both corps were heavily battered by concealed German tanks and assault guns. The next day, the 30th Tank Corps 'pushed in with a fierce attack' but the tank army 'covered only about one mile in all'.

On 25 October 1943 it was honoured and renamed the 10th Guards Uralsky Voluntary Tank Corps. The corps then fought in battles at Bryansk, Lower Silesia, Upper Silesia, Proskurovo-Kamenetc-Podolsk, Lvov-Sandomir and during the Vistula-Oder, Berlin and Prague Offensives. On 16 March 1944, Major General Yevtikhy Belov became the corps commander. On 22 October 1944, Belov became deputy commander of the 4th Tank Army and Colonel Nil Chuprov replaced him in command. Chuprov was wounded on 10 February 1945 and replaced by Belov. The corps was awarded the Order of the Red Banner, the Order of Suvorov and the Order of Kutuzov. The 62nd Guards Perm-Keletcky Tank Brigade, which had earlier received an honorific named for Kielce, was in addition awarded the Order of Bogdan Khmelnitsky for heroism shown in battle.

The corps finished the war in what is now Poland, and briefly became part of the Northern Group of Forces.

== Cold War ==
On 28 June 1945, the corps became a division at Chrudim. The brigades became regiments. On 31 October 1946, the division was reduced to a mobilization tank regiment. All attached units remained but were downsized. In 1947, the regiment moved to Krampnitz, German Democratic Republic, and became a division again in March 1950. The division was one of the formations used to suppress the East German uprising of 1953.

For good results in combat training on 16 June 1967 the division was named after Marshal of the Soviet Union Rodion Malinovsky and on 21 February 1978 it was awarded the Order of the October Revolution.

The 697th Separate Missile Battalion became part of the 448th Missile Brigade in September 1987. In June 1990, the division's 7th Separate Guards Reconnaissance Battalion was transferred to the 47th Guards Tank Division. The 47th's 112th Separate Reconnaissance Battalion replaced the 7th. At the time of its withdrawal from Germany in 1990 the division was equipped with 316 T-64BM tanks and 12 T-80B tanks.

=== Composition in the late 1980s ===
- 10th Guards Tank Ural-L'vov Volunteer Division (HQ Altengrabow)
  - 61st Guards Sverdlovsk-L'vov Tank Regiment (Altengrabow)
  - 62nd Guards Permian-Keletskiy Tank Regiment (Altengrabow)
  - 63rd Guards Chelyabinsk-Petrokovskiy Tank Regiment (Altengrabow)
  - 248th Guards Unechskiy Motor Rifle Regiment (Schönebeck)
  - 744th Guards Ternopol' Artillery Regiment (Altengrabow)
  - 359th Guards L'vov Anti-Aircraft Missile Regiment (Altengrabow)
  - 112th Separate Reconnaissance Battalion (Halberstadt, later Altengrabow)
  - 152nd Separate Guards Communications Battalion (Altengrabow)
  - 131st Separate Guards Engineer Battalion (Magdeburg)
  - 127th Separate Chemical Defence Battalion (Altengrabow)
  - 1072nd Separate Material Supply Battalion (Altengrabow)
  - 60th Separate Equipment Maintenance and Recovery Battalion (Altengrabow)
  - 188th Separate Medical Battalion (Altengrabow)

== Service in the Russian Ground Forces ==
The division was moved back to Boguchar in the Moscow Military District. The 6th Separate Guards Motor Rifle Brigade was withdrawn from Berlin, reorganised as a motor rifle regiment and was garrisoned at Kursk. The 63rd Guards Tank Regiment was combined with the 6th Separate Guards Motor Rifle Brigade combining with the tank regiment to form the 6th Guards Motor Rifle Regiment in 1997.

In 2009-2010 the division was reduced to a weapons and equipment storage site and mobilization tank brigade. Most recently the new formation has been named as the 262nd Guards Ural-Lvov Order of the October Revolution Red Banner Orders of Suvorov and Kutuzov Weapons and Equipment Storage Base named for Marshal of the Soviet Union R.I. Malinovsky (Russian: 262-я гвардейская Уральско-Львовская ордена Октябрьской Революции Краснознаменная орденов Суворова и Кутузова база хранения и ремонта вооружения и техники named for Marshal of the Soviet Union Р.Я. Малиновского (отбр) (п. Богучар Воронежской области, 1-я отбр).

In 2015 the Russian Ministry of Defence announced that the traditions of the division would be continued by a reformed 1st Separate Ural-Lvov Tank Brigade as part of the 20th Guards Army, still based in Boguchar. Sources however disagree as to whether the brigade was reformed; in any case the 3rd Motor Rifle Division ended up at Boguchar before the 2022 Russian invasion of Ukraine.

=== Subordinate units in 2006 ===
- 61st Guards Tank Regiment "Sverdlovsko-Lvovskiy"
- 62nd Guards Tank Regiment
- 6th Guards Motor Rifle Regiment (Kursk)
- 248th Motor Rifle Regiment
- 744th Artillery Regiment
- 359th Anti-Aircraft Rocket Regiment
- 112th Separate Intelligence Battalion
- 152nd Separate Communications Battalion
- 127th Separate Chemical Defence Battalion
- 131st Separate Engineer Battalion
- 60th Repair Battalion
- 1072nd Separate Logistics Battalion
- 188th Separate Medical Battalion
- 689th Separate Electronic Warfare Battalion

== Sources and references ==
- Keith Bonn (ed.), Slaughterhouse: The Handbook of the Eastern Front, Aberjona Press, Bedford, PA, 2005
- Feskov et al., Советская Армия в годы «холодной войны» (1945-1991), Tomsk: Tomsk University Press, 2004
- Heritage of Perm - News Archive
