= Raid on Tatsinskaya =

1942 battle

- Part of the Battle of Stalingrad and the Eastern Front of World War II
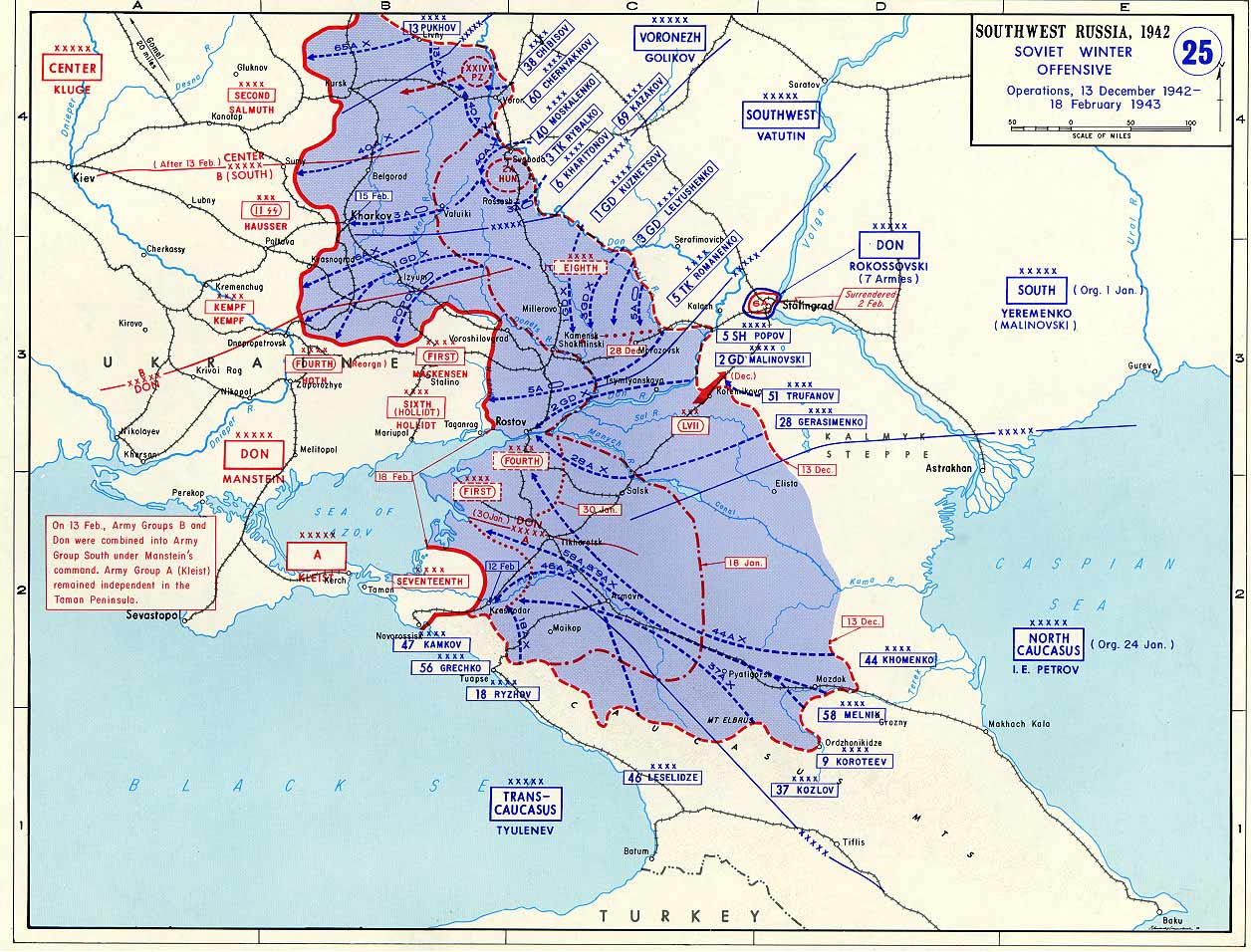
- Soviet Advances during Operation Little Saturn.
Date	December 16–28, 1942
Location	Tatsinskaya, Soviet Union
Result	Soviet victory

Belligerents
(Nazi Germany) Germany	Soviet Union

Commanders and leaders
(Nazi Germany) Hermann Balck	(Soviet Union) Vasily Badanov

Casualties and losses
Soviet claims for 12,000 KIA, 5,000 POW, unknown WIA, 84 tanks, 106 guns, 300 aircraft destroyed	Unknown KIA; Unknown MIA; Unknown WIA up to 190 tanks

The Raid on Tatsinskaya was a Soviet armoured raid deep into the German rear conducted by the 24th Tank Corps under the command of Major General Vasily Mikhaylovich Badanov in late December 1942. It took place during Operation Little Saturn, on the heels of the successful encirclement of the Wehrmacht's 6th Army in the Battle of Stalingrad. The raid was designed to force the Germans to divert forces attempting to relieve the 6th Army. The Soviet force captured its objective, the Luftwaffe's airlift hub at the Tatsinskaya Airfield. The Soviet forces destroyed over 72 aircraft on the ground, but were left cut off and without supplies. Despite the loss of most of the tank corps during the ensuing breakout, the raid was a great operational victory.

== Background ==
The Red Army had encircled the German 6th Army in Stalingrad with Operation Uranus, begun on 19 November 1942. By the middle of December, the German relief effort, Operation Winter Storm, reached within 48 km of the encirclement ring, and the airlift trying to supply the encircled army was in full swing. The Soviet High Command decided to launch Operation Little Saturn, to encircle all of German Army Group A, by penetrating to the south and the coast of the Sea of Azov. The intent was to endanger the German strategic position so severely that the Wehrmacht command had to give up any hope of relieving the 6th Army, and instead turn its attention to fighting the advancing Red Army formations, while simultaneously trying to move as many units as possible to the west.

As a consequence of the threat, the most potent of the German divisions involved in the relief effort, 6th Panzer Division, was turned west, and ordered to first clear the raiding force from Tatsinskaya, and later to establish a new frontline towards the north of the airfield. With that decision, any hope of breaking through to 6th Army had vanished.

== The battle ==
=== Soviet planning ===
The Soviet 24th Tank Corps (Note: A tank corps was actually a division-size formation, but commanded by an officer with the rank of a corps commander.) (later the 2nd Guards Tank Corps) belonged to the 3rd Guards Army, which was commanded by General Dmitri Lelyushenko, which was a part of the Southwestern Front under the command of Nikolai Vatutin. The corps was designated as the army's exploitation force, in line with the doctrine of Deep Battle. It was therefore not to be committed during the initial breaching of the tactical defenses of Axis forces in the sector, but would be committed once a breach in these defenses had been opened.

The assault by 3rd Guards Army commenced during the morning of 16 December 1942. In order to accelerate the breaching of the Axis tactical defense by his rifle formations, Lelyushenko committed the other two tank corps available to him (17th and 25th Tank Corps) during the initial phase of the battle.

The 24th Tank Corps was ordered to commence its operation at 1130 hours on 17 December. At this stage, the 17th and 25th Tank Corps had already reached the operational depth and were in the process of encircling Italian 8th Army and battling the forces of Army Detachment Hollidt. 25th Tank Corps later conducted a deep raid towards Morozovsk to the east of Tatsinskaya. The purpose of the two deep raids was to cut off the German formations conducting Operation Winter Storm, the relief attempt for the German 6th Army.

=== The raid ===
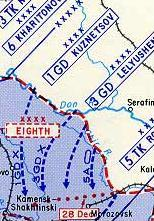
Detail of USMA Map showing the penetration routes of 24th and 25th Tank Corps (3GD arrow = 24th Tank Corps; Unlabeled arrow = 25th Tank Corps.

The raid was aimed at the German Luftwaffe's Tatsinskaya Airfield, from which a major part of the Stalingrad relief airlift was conducted. The airfield was located at the town of Tatsinskaya (population 5,000 at the time). On Christmas Eve, 24 December 1942, the Soviets captured the town and the airfield. The airfield may not have received a warning, since flight operations were still going on. An eyewitness account by a Soviet officer describes the scene:

Our tank detachments unexpectedly broke into Tatsinski military airport. First to penetrate enemy's territory was captain Nechaev's battalion. A tough fight between tanks and enemy anti aircraft artillery began. Germans were shooting grenades at the Russian (sic - Soviet) tanks and managed to blow up several of them. However the Soviet tank crews broke the Nazi defense. After they destroyed patrol forces, Russian (sic) soldiers started shooting German pilots that rushed to their planes desperately hoping to save their lives.

The airfield housed 170 operational transport aircraft, plus an unknown number of non-operational aircraft. The German defenses were quickly overrun, while about 100 (according to German estimates) transport planes managed to escape. German estimates were that 72 were destroyed, or almost 10% of the transport capacity of the Luftwaffe. Many of the planes were destroyed by Soviet tanks ramming the tail sections. A number of planes were destroyed while still on railway cars on which they had arrived. Shortly after the airfield was seized however, the 24th Tank Corps was cut off by the arriving German reinforcements and found itself without supplies deep inside the German lines.

Zhukov wrote in his memoirs that the Corps "captured a trainload of disassembled aircraft", and "crushed" 200 German transport aircraft "ready to take off." Then "for five whole days the armoured corps held Tatsinskaya, putting up fierce resistance to encircling enemy reserves."

=== German reaction ===
Already while the battle for the airfield and the town were going on, it became clear to Badanov that he had been cut off, when march columns of his 24th Motorized Brigade were followed from the north by German forces. On 26 December, the last elements of the 24th Motorized Brigade managed to break through the encirclement to join the main body of the corps. Field Marshal Erich von Manstein had meanwhile ordered the XLVIII Panzer Corps to move towards the deep penetrations the Red Army had achieved with the 11th Panzer Division and 6th Panzer Division. From 26 December, the two divisions had cut off completely the connection between the 24th Tank Corps and 1st Guards Army. Towards the north, a mixed Kampfgruppe blocked the road against other Red Army formations that might come to the assistance of the 24th Tank Corps. The German command also brought up the 579th Infantry Regiment of the 306th Infantry Division and three armoured trains: PZ 10a, 10b and 28. Together, these forces launched an attack with the aim of destroying the 24th Tank Corps.

Stavka reacted by ordering the Front command to assist Badanov's force. The available units were 25th Tank Corps, which had been reduced to 25 tanks by heavy combat, and 1st Guards Mechanized Corps, which had incurred losses too. They were reinforced with infantry, but did not manage to break through to Tatsinskaya. This led to the need for Badanov and his surviving men to break out to escape destruction, and permission to do so was given on 28 December. Most of the matériel and many men were lost during the break-out, but the damage to the Germans had been done. German forces engaged in the relief of Stalingrad had to be withdrawn to deal with the raiders, and many irreplaceable transport planes of the Luftwaffe had been destroyed, with their crews and ground personnel mostly killed. The 24th Tank Corps claimed the destruction of 84 tanks, 106 guns, the killing of 12,000 Axis soldiers and the capture of almost 5,000 more in this operation.

== Analysis ==
Despite the loss of most of the tank corps' heavy equipment, the raid was a decisive operational success. The 24th Tank Corps operated up to 150 miles (240 km) from its supply base, and eventually had to rely on captured supplies to stay operational. The follow-on Soviet infantry were not mobile enough to keep up, allowing the Germans to cut off the connection between the raiding force and its supply base, and ultimately defeat the operational intent of cutting off a large part of the German forces in the region.

Despite this, the raid had pushed a strong formation deep into the rear of mobile German formations, heavily damaged the Luftwaffe, and forced the German command to modify its own operational plans. Previous Soviet raids had been by much weaker cavalry or airborne forces operating with partisans, and these had not been able to inflict as much damage.

Much was learned by the Soviet command from the raid, and it probably gave further impetus to create the new tank armies as independent formations capable of conducting sustained operations deep in the enemy rear. The almost complete loss of the equipment and that of many of the personnel of the 24th Tank Corps also brought home the truth that operating so deep behind enemy lines carried exceptional risks.

== Recognition ==
Stavka was quick in recognising the exceptional achievement of the 24th Tank Corps. Major General Badanov became the first recipient of the newly created Order of Suvorov, 2nd Class, for this operation, and quickly went on to command 4th Tank Army later in the war, which he led in Operation Kutuzov in July 1943. From 1944 onwards, he commanded the Red Army Armoured School, and he rose to the rank of lieutenant-general.

During the raid, the 24th Tank Corps was renamed 2nd Guards Tank Corps and given the honorific title 'Tatsinskaya' in honour of its achievement. It later played a key role in the Battle of Prokhorovka, as well as many other important operations during the remainder of the war. Captain Nechaev, commander of the last tanks of the tank corps was made a posthumous Hero of the Soviet Union for his actions.

== Forces ==
=== Soviet forces ===
==== 24th Tank Corps ====
The strength of the corps was 90% of tanks provided for in the TO&E for a total of 159 tanks, 50% of motor transport, and 70% of personnel. The Corps was supplied with two units of ammunition, (Note: one unit (also referred to as 'combat load') is defined as standard expenditure of the item in question during a day of combat.) two units of fuel and lubricants, and five days of rations.

- 24th Tank Corps (Major General of Tank Troops V.M. Badanov)
  - Corps Troops
    - 13th Mining Engineer Company
    - 158th Mobile Repair Base
  - 4th Guards Tank Brigade (Colonel G.I. Kolypov) (Note: At this time, a tank brigade consisted of two tank battalions (usually with two medium companies of 10 T-34 and one light company of 10 T-70 each) and one motorized rifle battalion, as well as an anti-tank artillery battery, and a headquarters company.)
  - 54th Tank Brigade (Colonel V.M. Polyakov)
  - 130th Tank Brigade (Colonel S.K. Nesterov)
  - 24th Motorized Rifle Brigade (Colonel V.S. Savchenko) (Note: Motorized rifle regiments consisted of three motorized rifle battalions, an artillery battalion, an anti-aircraft artillery battalion, a mortar battery, and a headquarters company.)

Reinforcements attached to the corps for the raid:

- 658th Anti Aircraft Artillery Regiment
- 413th Guards Mortar (MLRS) Battalion

Air support was provided by 3rd Composite Air Corps of 17th Air Army, through an aerial liaison officer travelling with the HQ of the 24th Tank Corps.

==== Other forces ====
- 25th Tank Corps
- 1st Guards Mechanized Corps

=== German forces ===
- XLVIII Panzer Corps
  - 11th Panzer Division
  - 6th Panzer Division
  - 306th Infantry Division
