= Vasily Badanov =

Soviet military officer (1895–1971)

Vasily Mikhailovich Badanov
- Васи́лий Миха́йлович Бада́нов
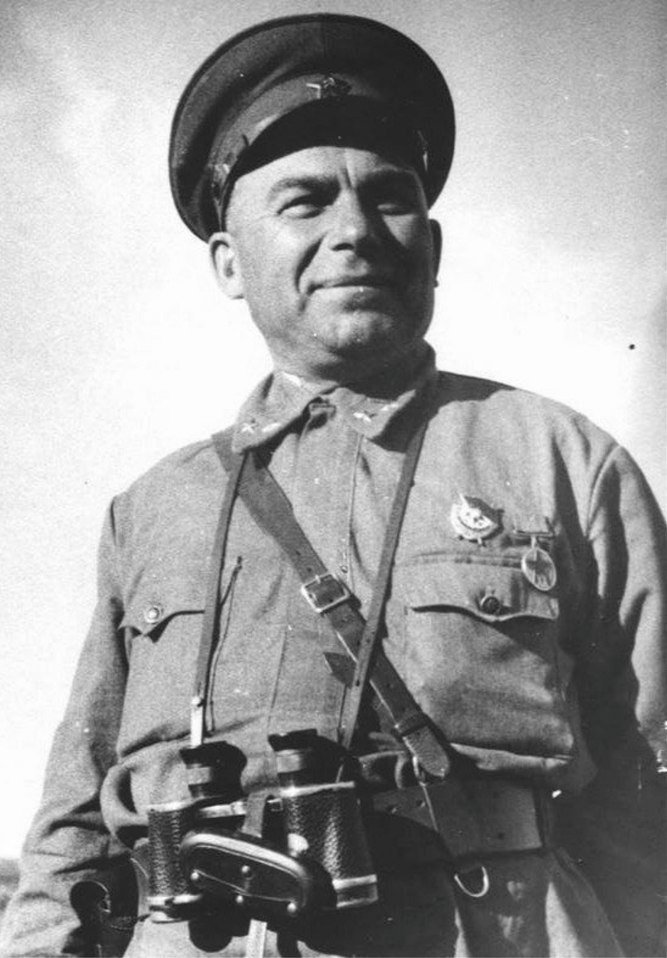
- Born: 14 December 1895; Verkhnyaya Yakushka, Simbirsk Governorate, Russian Empire
- Died: 1 April 1971 (aged 75); Moscow, Soviet Union
- Military career
- Allegiance: (Russia) Russian Empire (1915–1917); Soviet Union (1919–1953)
- Branch: Russian Imperial Army; Red Army
- Service years: 1915–1917; 1919–1953
- Rank: Lieutenant-general
- Commands: 24th Tank Corps; 4th Tank Army
- Conflicts: World War I Russian Civil War; World War II
- Awards: Order of Lenin; Order of the Red Banner (3); Order of Suvorov, 2nd class; Order of Kutuzov, 2nd class; Order of the Patriotic War, 2nd class; Order of the Red Star; various other medals

Vasily Mikhailovich Badanov (Russian: Васи́лий Миха́йлович Бада́нов; 14 December 1895 – 1 April 1971) was a Soviet military officer and general, best known for his leadership in the Tatsinskaya Raid (1942) and subsequent command of the 4th Tank Army (1943–1944).

== Early life, World War I and Russian Civil War ==
Vasily Mikhailovich Badanov was born in the village of Verkhnyaya Yakushka, Simbirsk Governorate on 14 December 1895. Conscripted into the Imperial Russian Army in 1915 during World War I, he graduated from the Chuguyev Military School as a praporshchik in 1916, and fought as a platoon commander with the 493rd Klin Infantry Regiment on the Southwestern Front. In 1917 he was elected a member of the regimental committee. During the Russian Civil War, Badanov was conscripted into the Red Army in September 1919 and appointed assistant military instructor of the Kurgansky Uyezd Military Commissariat in Tobolsk Governorate. He became a company commander in the 27th Omsk Rifle Division in October of that year and with the division fought as part of the 5th Army against the forces of Kolchak near Kurgan, Petropavlovsk, Omsk, Barabinsk, and Novonikolayevsk. From December of that year, Badanov served as assistant military commissar of the Melekessky Uyezd Military Commissariat in Samara Governorate. While serving in this position he was imprisoned for "anti-Soviet activities" between 30 March and 19 July 1920. From February 1921 he was chief of staff of a rifle brigade of the supreme commander's reserve, fighting in the suppression of anti-Soviet resistance in Belorussia. Badanov joined the Communist Party in 1919.

== Interwar period ==
Badanov served as temporary assistant chief of the school of the 21st Separate Brigade of the Cheka from October 1921, soon transferring to serve in the same position with the 13th Separate Brigade of the Cheka. He became commander and military commissar of the 29th Separate Gomel Battalion of the OGPU Troops of the Western Front in June 1922. After serving as commander and military commissar of the 1st Rifle Regiment of the OGPU Troops from December 1923, Badanov entered the Vystrel course in October 1926. Upon graduation in November 1927 he was appointed commander and military commissar of the 26th Separate Chapayev Regiment of the OGPU Troops. After being sent to serve as chief of the machine-gun course of the Saratov Reserve Commanders' Retraining School in the Volga Military District during January 1930, he completed retraining at the Leningrad Armored Commanders' Improvement Courses between December 1930 and May 1931. After finishing the courses, Badanov became a battalion commander at the Saratov Armored School.

Badanov completed the Kazan Commanders Technical Improvement Course of the Volga Military District between March and September 1932 and entered the Commanders Academic Technical Improvement Course at the Military Academy of Mechanization and Motorization in March 1934. Upon completion of the course in July of that year, he became commander of a separate battalion of the Moscow Military District. Badanov served as assistant chief for the training and personnel section of the Military-Automobile Technical School of the Volga Military District from April 1936, and in January 1940 became chief of the Poltava Military-Automobile Technical School. By then a colonel, he was appointed commander of the 55th Tank Division of the 25th Mechanized Corps of the Kharkov Military District in March 1941.

== World War II ==
After Operation Barbarossa began, Badanov led the division as part of the 21st Army in the Battle of Smolensk. The division was disbanded in September, and he was appointed commander of the 12th Tank Brigade on the Southwestern Front. The brigade was withdrawn to the front reserve on 22 October, and took part in the Barvenkovo–Lozovaya offensive from 18 January, assigned to the 57th Army. From March 1942, he served as acting deputy commander of the 56th Army for tank forces, fighting in the battles on the approaches to Taganrog. Badanov took command of the 24th Tank Corps of the Southern Front on 19 April. From July, he led it in heavy defensive battles in the Voronezh sector and in the Great Bend of the Don as part of the Bryansk and Voronezh Fronts. At the beginning of December, the corps took part in Operation Little Saturn, with Badanov leading it in the Tatsinskaya Raid into the German rear. Badanov was promoted to lieutenant general on 26 December 1942 and became the first recipient of the Order of Suvorov, second class, the same day. For its performance, the corps became the elite 2nd Guards Tank Corps.

Badanov continued to command the 2nd Guards Tank Corps in Operation Gallop in the Donbas in January 1943, and the repulse of the German counteroffensive in the Third Battle of Kharkov in March 1943. He was promoted to command the 4th Tank Army in July 1943, leading it during Operation Kutuzov and the battles for Right-bank Ukraine. The army was withdrawn to the Reserve of the Supreme High Command in September 1943, and in February 1944 joined the 1st Ukrainian Front. On 6 January 1944 he was awarded the United States Distinguished Service Cross for "extraordinary heroism". Badanov was seriously wounded during the Proskurov-Chernivtsi Offensive during March 1944. After recovering, he served as chief of the Military Training Institutions Directorate of the Main Directorate for Formation and Combat Training of the Armored and Mechanized Forces of the Red Army from August of that year.

== Postwar ==
After the end of the war, Badanov continued to serve in his previous position. He served as commander of the Armored and Mechanized Forces of the Central Group of Forces from June 1946. Beginning the Higher Academic Courses at the Voroshilov Higher Military Academy on 30 April 1949, Badanov was appointed chief of the Higher Educational Institutions Directorate of the Armored and Mechanized Forces of the Soviet Army after his graduation in July 1950. He retired on 8 June 1953 and died in Moscow on 1 April 1971, being buried in the Novodevichy Cemetery.

== Honours and awards ==
- Order of Lenin
- Order of the Red Banner, three times
- Order of Suvorov, 2nd class
- Order of Kutuzov, 2nd class
- Order of the Patriotic War, 2nd class
- Order of the Red Star
- Jubilee Medal "In Commemoration of the 100th Anniversary since the Birth of Vladimir Il'ich Lenin"
- Medal "For the Defence of Stalingrad"
- Medal "For the Victory over Germany in the Great Patriotic War 1941–1945"
- Jubilee Medal "Twenty Years of Victory in the Great Patriotic War 1941-1945"
- Jubilee Medal "XX Years of the Workers' and Peasants' Red Army"
- Jubilee Medal "30 Years of the Soviet Army and Navy"
- Jubilee Medal "40 Years of the Armed Forces of the USSR"
- Jubilee Medal "50 Years of the Armed Forces of the USSR"
- Distinguished Service Cross
