= Ivan Chistyakov =

Soviet general (1900–1979)

Ivan Mikhailovich Chistyakov
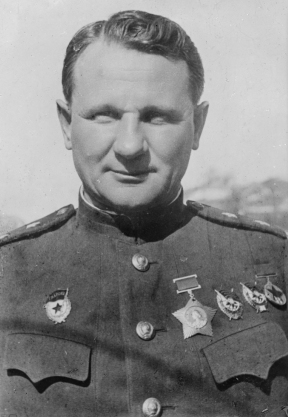
- Chistyakov in 1943
- Born: 27 September [O.S. 14 September] 1900; Otrubnevo, Slavkovskoy volost, Kashinsky Uyezd, Tver Governorate, Russian Empire
- Died: 7 March 1979 (aged 78) Moscow, Russian SFSR, Soviet Union
- Allegiance: Soviet Union
- Branch: Red Army
- Service years: 1918–1968
- Rank: Colonel general
- Commands: 8th Guards Rifle Division; 1st Guards Army; 21st Army; 6th Guards Army; 25th Army; 28th Army; 8th Guards Army
- Conflicts: Russian Civil War; World War II
- Awards: Hero of the Soviet Union

Ivan Mikhailovich Chistyakov (Russian: Иван Михайлович Чистяков; 27 September [O.S. 14 September] 1900 – 7 March 1979) was a Soviet Army colonel general and a Hero of the Soviet Union.

Chistyakov joined the Red Army during the Russian Civil War and rose from ordinary soldier to junior commander. He served in Dagestan during the 1920s and early 1930s before being transferred to the Soviet Far East, where he commanded a corps by the outbreak of Operation Barbarossa. Chistyakov was transferred to the Eastern Front in late 1941 and attained division and corps command during the Battle of Moscow. He commanded the 21st Army during the Battle of Stalingrad and continued to command it for the rest of the war as the 6th Guards Army. Chistyakov led the army in the Battle of Kursk and was made a Hero of the Soviet Union for his leadership of the army during Operation Bagration. After the end of the war in Europe, he was transferred to the Far East again to serve as the commander of the 25th Army, which occupied North Korea during the Soviet invasion of Manchuria in August 1945. Postwar, Chistyakov held several army commands before finishing his career with the Ground Forces inspectorate in the 1960s.

== Early life and Russian Civil War ==
Chistyakov was born to a working-class family on 27 September 1900, in the village of Otrubnevo, Slavkovskoy volost, Kashinsky Uyezd, Tver Governorate. During the Russian Civil War, he joined the Red Army on 1 May 1918, serving as a Red Army man and junior commander in the 1st Tula Volunteer Regiment. With the regiment, Chistyakov fought in the suppression of an uprising in Yazkovskoy volost, Tula Governorate, and from November fought against the White forces of Anton Denikin and Pyotr Krasnov in Voronezh Governorate. Between April and July 1919 he was on leave due to illness before being appointed a Red Army man in the 11th Reserve Battalion at Saratov. Chistyakov studied at the Commanders' Machine Gun School at Saratov from December 1919; the school was transferred to Novocherkassk in March 1920. Upon graduation in June, Chistyakov was sent to the 1st Reserve Regiment of the Reserve Brigade in Rostov-on-Don.

Transferred to the 124th Rifle Regiment of the 14th Rifle Division in August, he successively served with the latter as an assistant platoon commander, platoon starshina, and platoon commander. With the regiment, he fought as part of the 9th Army in the North Caucasus. From November, the regiment fought in the suppression of the uprising of Najmuddin of Gotzo in Dagestan, participating in heavy fighting near the aul of Aymaki and on the Botlikh direction.

== Interwar period ==
Chistyakov was assigned to accompany the staff of the Caucasian Front, during the relocation of the latter from Rostov-on-Don to Tiflis in May 1921, then transferred to become a platoon commander with the 1st Dagestan Brigade, stationed in Temir-Khan-Shura, in late June. The brigade was subsequently reorganized as a regiment and became the 37th Rifle Regiment of the 13th Dagestan Rifle Division in July 1922. Chistyakov served with the latter for roughly fifteen years, as a platoon commander, head of the regimental machine gun detachment, machine gun company commander, machine gun battalion commander, and assistant to the regimental commander for personnel. During this period, he was repeatedly sent to various Commanders' Improvement Courses: between June and July 1922 the 13th Rifle Division commanders' refresher courses, the midlevel commanders' refresher department at the Vladikavkaz Infantry School from September 1924 to August 1925, machine gun training at the Kuskovo testing ground, and the Vystrel course between November 1929 and May 1930.

Chistyakov was promoted to major in 1935, before being sent to the Far East in August 1936 to serve as head of the 1st staff department of the 92nd Rifle Division of the Special Red Banner Far Eastern Army. He took command of the division's 275th Rifle Regiment in December 1936, a position made permanent in January 1938. He was promoted to colonel in 1938. After commanding the 105th Rifle Division of the 1st Separate Red Banner Army from June 1938, Chistyakov temporarily served as assistant commander of the army's 39th Rifle Corps from July 1939. He became head of the Vladivostok Infantry School in February 1940, then commanded the 39th Rifle Corps from March 1941. The latter transferred to the newly formed 25th Army in June.

== World War II ==
After Operation Barbarossa, the German invasion of the Soviet Union, began in late June, Chistyakov remained in the Far East with the corps, covering the Soviet-Manchurian border in Primorye. Sent to the Western Front in November, he was appointed commander of the 64th Separate Rifle Brigade, transferring to command the 8th Guards Rifle Division in January 1942. On 17 January 1942 he was promoted to major general. Chistyakov led both units during the Battle of Moscow and in April 1942 took command of the 2nd Guards Rifle Corps, part of the Northwestern and then Kalinin Fronts. During the Toropets–Kholm Offensive, the corps advanced up to 200 kilometers in harsh winter conditions as part of the 3rd Shock Army. He was appointed commander of the 1st Guards Army of the Don Front in September, but quickly transferred to command the 21st Army in October.

Chistyakov led the 21st Army in the Battle of Stalingrad, and was promoted to lieutenant general on 18 January 1943. The army was converted into the 6th Guards Army for its actions in the battle; he commanded it for the rest of the war in Europe. In 1943 he led the army in the Battle of Kursk, the advance into Left-bank Ukraine, and the Battle of the Dnieper. On 28 June 1944 Chistyakov was promoted to colonel general. During Operation Bagration in June and early July, the army defeated the German forces near Nevel. For the "skillful command" of his army and showing "personal courage and heroism" in these operations, he was made a Hero of the Soviet Union on 22 July 1944. In the recapture of the Baltic states, Chistyakov led the army in the Šiauliai, Riga, and Memel Offensives during the rest of 1944, as well as the elimination of the Courland Pocket in early 1945.

After the surrender of Germany, Chistyakov was sent to the Far East in June to command the 25th Army of the Maritime Group of Forces. During the Soviet invasion of Manchuria the army, as part of the 1st Far East Front, fought in the Harbin–Kirin Offensive. The units of the army broke through the Japanese border fortifications and captured Laoheishan and Hunchun on 11 August. On 12 August, in cooperation with naval infantry from the Pacific Fleet, the army captured Yuki and Rashin on the east coast of Korea. The army continued to advance, defeating the Japanese 3rd and 34th Armies and capturing Wangqing, Seishin, Ranan, Yanji, and other cities. In late August, the army relocated to the Pyongyang area.

== Postwar ==
After the end of the war, Chistyakov continued to command the 25th Army. He transferred to command the 5th Army in the Primorsky Military District during February 1947, and studied at Higher Academic Courses at the Voroshilov Higher Military Academy from 20 April 1948 to 1 April 1949. After commanding the 28th Army of the Belorussian Military District after his completion of the course, Chistyakov transferred to the Group of Soviet Occupation Forces in Germany to command the 8th Guards Army in December 1953. He became first deputy commander of the Transcaucasian Military District in September 1954, and transferred to the Ground Forces Inspectorate of the Main Inspectorate of the Ministry of Defense as a general inspector in July 1957. Chistyakov retired on 4 July 1968, and lived in Moscow until his death on 7 March 1979. He was buried at the Novodevichy Cemetery.

== Awards and honors ==
Chistyakov received the following awards and decorations:

- Hero of the Soviet Union
- Two Orders of Lenin
- Five Orders of the Red Banner
- Three Orders of Suvorov (Two 1st class, one 2nd class)
- Two Orders of Kutuzov, 1st class
- Medals
- Foreign orders and medals

He was a delegate to the second and fourth convocations of the Supreme Soviet of the Soviet Union.
