= Primorsky Group of Forces =

- Active: February 1932- July 1938;April 1945-August 1945
- Country: Soviet Union
- Type: Army group command
- Role: Coordination of Red Army forces in the Far East
- Size: Several armies

Commanders
- Notable commanders: Kirill Meretskov

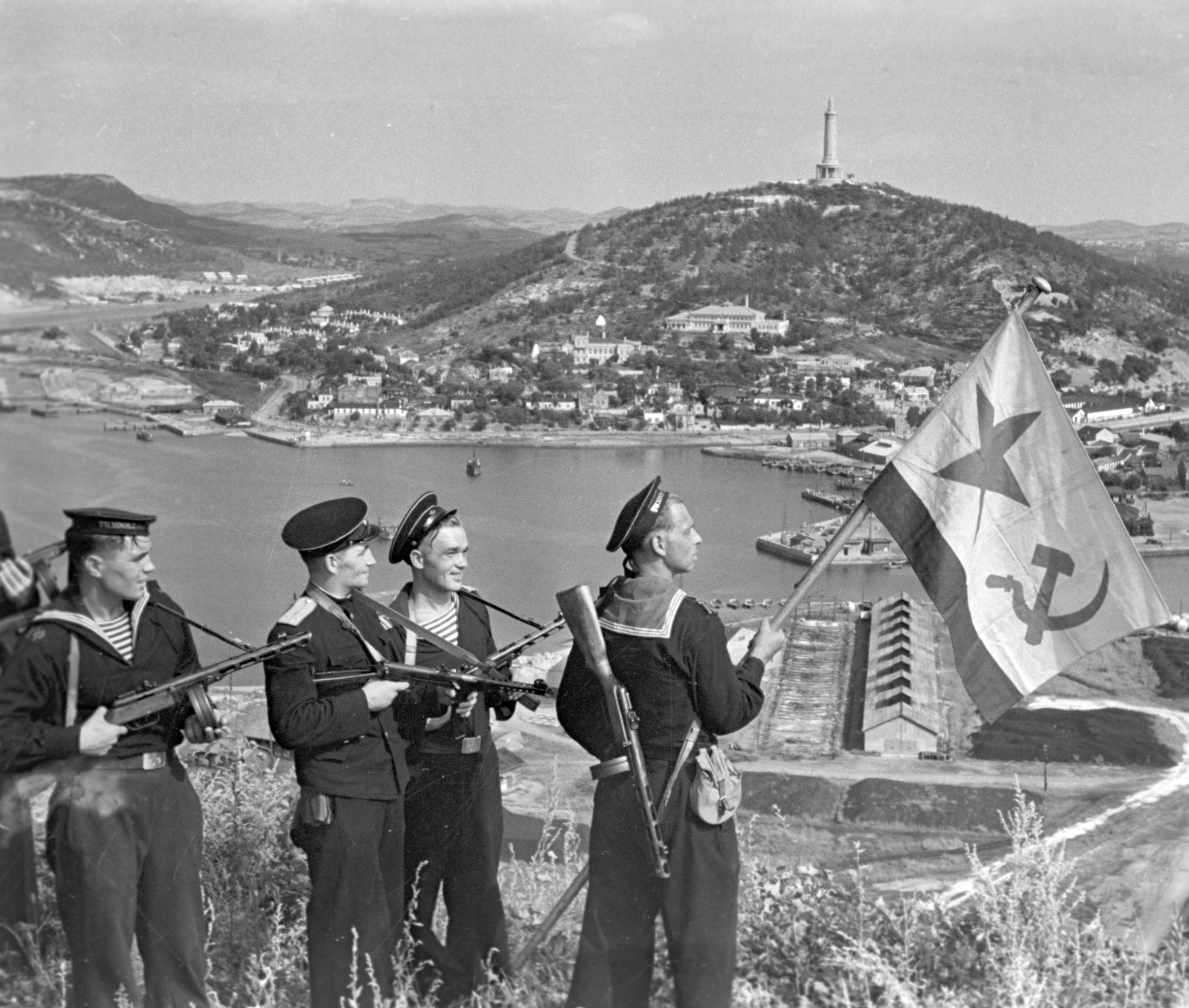

The Primorsky Group of Forces was a front of the Red Army during World War II in the Far East. It was split off from the Far Eastern Front in March 1945 and renamed the 1st Far Eastern Front on 5 August 1945.

It included: 1st Red Banner Army, 25th Army, 35th Army, 9th Air Army, and the 10th Mechanized Corps, located along the boundary line of Guberovo to the border with Korea.

== History ==
It was formed in 1932 as part of the Special Red Banner Far Eastern Army. The headquarters of the group was in Nikolsk-Ussuriski, renamed Voroshilov in 1935. In July 1938, the 1st Red Banner Army was formed from the Maritime Group of Forces

The group was reformed as part of the Far Eastern Front in July 1943. It originally included the 1st Red Banner Army, 25th Army, 35th Army, 10th Mechanized Corps and the 9th Air Army. The units were based along the boundary line of Guberovo village in Pozharsky District of Primorsky Krai to the Korean border. On 5 August 1945, it was renamed the Far Eastern Front.

== Commanders ==
- Vitovt Putna (February 1932 – July 1934)
- Ivan Fedko (July 1934 – May 1937)
- Mikhail Lewandowski (June 1937 – February 1938)
- Kuzma Podlas (February–July 1938)
- Filipp Parusinov (July 1943 – July 1945)
- Kirill Meretskov (July – 5 August, 1945)
