= 105th Rifle Division =

- Active: 1936–1946
- Country: Soviet Union
- Branch: Red Army
- Type: Infantry
- Engagements: Soviet invasion of Manchuria

The 105th Rifle Division (Russian: 105-я стрелковая дивизия) was an infantry division of the Red Army. Formed in the 1930s, the division spent World War II on the border in Primorye, seeing its only combat in the Soviet invasion of Manchuria. It was disbanded shortly after the war ended.

== History ==
The 105th Rifle Division was formed in May 1936 in Primorye. The elements of the division were previously assigned to the Poltavka Fortified Region. On 22 June 1941, the division was a separate unit of the 25th Army of the Far Eastern Front. The division included the following elements:

- 53rd Rifle Regiment
- 130th Rifle Regiment
- 267th Rifle Regiment
- 102nd (former 215th) Artillery Regiment
- 148th Howitzer Artillery Regiment (until January 1942)
- 17th Reconnaissance Company
- 57th Separate Anti-Tank Battalion
- 464th Separate Self-Propelled Artillery Battalion (from 1942)
- 88th Sapper Battalion
- 55th Separate Signals Battalion (former 55th Separate Signals Company)
- 498th Auto Transport Battalion (former 358th Auto Transport Company)
- 92nd Medical-Sanitary Battalion
- 100th Separate Chemical Defense Company
- 36th Field Bakery

The division spent most of World War II covering the border east of Vladivostok. Colonel Vsevolod Seber commanded the division from 9 July 1943 and was promoted to major general on 22 April 1945. The 105th did not see action until August 1945, when it fought in the Soviet invasion of Manchuria as part of the 25th Army.

With the army, the 105th became part of the 1st Far Eastern Front on 5 August and by 8 August concentrated in the area of Aleksey-Nikolskoye, Bogatyrka, and Ulitikha, with the task of covering the approaches to Voroshilov and securing the flank of the 25th Army. After the war began, the division was in the army reserve and from 14 to 18 August carried out a 140-kilometer march in difficult mountain and forest conditions to concentrate in the area of Sanchakou, Dulin, Laoheishan, and Shitoukhentsy. During the march the division was subjected to repeated attacks of Japanese sabotage groups, losing four killed and twelve wounded while being credited with killing 42 Japanese saboteurs. The division then conducted a 72 kilometer march to the area of Wangqing between 18 and 28 August. During the invasion, the division captured 4,925 Japanese soldiers and officers, 22 light and nine heavy machine guns, and 220 horses.

The division was ordered disbanded by the 10 September order forming the Primorsky Military District from the 1st Far Eastern Front. The disbandment of the division was carried out during July 1946.

== Commanders ==
The following officers commanded the division:

- Colonel Ivan Chistyakov (June 1938–July 1939)
- Colonel Afanasy Kopychko (23 March 1941–7 August 1942)
- Major General Yudel Leontyevich Gorodinsky (10–28 August 1942)
- Colonel Vladimir Vasilievich Baranov (6 September 1942–2 March 1943)
- Lieutenant Colonel Aleksandr Grigoryevich Smirnov (10 March–8 July 1943)
- Colonel Vsevolod Ivanovich Seber (7 July 1943–March 1946, major general 22 April 1945)
