= Primorsky Military District =

Soviet military unit

- Active: 1945–1953
- Country: Soviet Union
- Type: Military district
- Part of: Soviet Armed Forces
- Garrison/HQ: Voroshilov

Commanders
- Notable commanders: Kirill Meretskov; Sergey Biryuzov

The Primorsky Military District was a military district of the Soviet Armed Forces that existed in from 1945 to 1953. Formed from the headquarters of the 1st Far East Front after the end of World War II, the district controlled troops on the territory of Primorsky Krai, North Korea and the Kwantung Peninsula. It was disbanded in 1953 and the territory became part of the Far Eastern Military District.

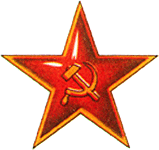
Red Army badge

== History ==
The Primorsky (Maritime Provinces) Military District was formed on September 30, 1945 on the territory of Primorsky Krai (territory of the former Ussuri Oblast), from HQ 1st Far East Front. Under its control also were the troops stationed on the territory of North Korea (25th Army) and the Kwantung Peninsula (39th Army). The district headquarters was in the city of Voroshilov (Ussuriisk). Troops stationed in Primorsky Krai were the 5th and 35th Armies. Air support was provided by the 9th Air Army. The 35th Army, the 17th Rifle Corps and the 105th, 187th, 190th, 231st, 235th, 335th, 345th, 363rd, 365th and 366th Rifle Divisions were disbanded. The 5th Army's two tank divisions, the 2nd and 3rd, were the only Soviet tank divisions in the Far East. The 25th Army's 39th and 88th Rifle Corps were disbanded in August 1946. Also during the summer of 1946, 39th Army's 91st Guards, 252nd, 338th and 358th Rifle Divisions were converted into the 4th, 25th and 26th Guards Machine Gun Artillery Brigades. In 1947, these became the 25th Guards Machine Gun Artillery Division. 39th Army's 113th Rifle Corps disbanded in January 1947. 25th Army pulled out of North Korea in 1948 and was stationed in southern Primorsky Krai on Sino-North Korean border and on the coast of the Peter the Great Gulf. By 1948, the army only included the 10th Mechanized and 40th Rifle Divisions, as its other units had all disbanded before 1948.

On 1 June 1953, the district was disbanded, and its territory was absorbed by the Far Eastern Military District.

== Composition ==
The district included:

- Headquarters 5th Army: 9th, 10th and 24th Machine-Gun Artillery Divisions; 63rd, 144th, 215th, 277th Rifle Divisions and the 2nd Tank Division (Lipovtsy, Primorskiy Krai) and 3rd Tank Division were located in the Ussuri Oblast.
- Headquarters 25th Army: 10th Mechanized (ex 10th Mechanized Corps (Military Unit Number 71516) and 40th Rifle Divisions were in what is now North Korea. Michael Holm's research suggests that by April 1946, the 3rd Tank Division had joined the 25th Army, located at Pokrovka in Primorskiy Krai. It was part of the 25th Army there until 1957.
- Headquarters 39th Army: the 25th Guards Machine-Gun Artillery Division, 7th Mechanized Division (Military Unit Number 36848) (Port Arthur, the 5th Guards Rifle Corps as part of the 17th and 19th Guards Rifle Division were located on the Kwantung Peninsula.
- 9th Air Army – 19th Bomber Aviation Corps, six other divisions, three other regiments as of late 1945. Became 54th Air Army in February 1949.

== Commanders ==
The following officers commanded the district.

- Marshal Kirill Meretskov, 1945–1947
- Colonel-General Sergey Biriuzov, 1947–1953
