= 366th Rifle Division =

World War II Red Army unit

366th Rifle Division (August 10, 1941 – March 17, 1942) 366th Rifle Division (November 27, 1944 - October, 1945)
- Active: 1st formation: 1941–1942; 2nd formation: 1944–1945
- Country: Soviet Union
- Branch: Red Army
- Type: Division
- Role: Infantry
- Engagements: Siege of Leningrad; Lyuban Offensive Operation; Soviet invasion of Manchuria
- Decorations: Order of the Red Banner (2nd formation)

Commanders
- Notable commanders: Col. Semyon Ivanovich Bulanov; Col. Ivan Alekseevich Manuilov

The 366th Rifle Division was an infantry division of the Red Army during World War II, formed twice.

It began forming in August, 1941, as a standard Red Army rifle division, in the Tomsk Oblast. After forming, it was assigned to the 59th Army, which soon moved west and joined the front facing the German Army Group North on the Volkhov River. In January, 1942, the division played a leading role in the early successes of the Lyuban Offensive Operation, which looked set to encircle and defeat the enemy forces laying siege to Leningrad. and on March 17 the division was redesignated as the 19th Guards Rifle Division. In November, 1944, a new 366th Rifle Division was formed in the Far Eastern Front, and saw action in the Soviet invasion of Manchuria in August, 1945, being awarded the Order of the Red Banner for its services.

== 1st Formation ==
The division began forming on August 10, 1941 in the Siberian Military District in the Tomsk Oblast. Its basic order of battle was as follows:

- 1218th Rifle Regiment
- 1220th Rifle Regiment
- 1222nd Rifle Regiment
- 938th Artillery Regiment

Col. Semyon Ivanovich Bulanov was assigned to command of the division on September 1, and he would remain in command for the duration of the 1st formation. In late November it was assigned to the 59th Army which was also forming in the Siberian District. In mid-December the entire 59th Army was moved by rail to Vologda, in the Leningrad - Volkhov sector of the front. On December 17 the Army was assigned to the Volkhov Group of Leningrad Front, which later became Volkhov Front. On January 7, 1942, the 366th attacked across the frozen river and along with the rest of 59th Army and the 2nd Shock Army carved out a threatening, but vulnerable pocket deep behind Army Group North, but eventually the offensive stalled, mostly due to supply difficulties. On March 17 the division was recognized for its successes by being redesignated as the 19th Guards Rifle Division in 52nd Army. This came just as the German 18th Army was in the process of cutting off and trapping that Army in the half-frozen wasteland south of Lyuban, and the division was already fighting for its existence.

== 2nd Formation ==
A new 366th Rifle Division was formed on November 27, 1944 from the second formation of the 21st Rifle Brigade and the 247th Rifle Brigade, in the 17th Rifle Corps of the 25th Army in Far Eastern Front, as part of the preparation for the coming offensive against the Japanese forces in Manchuria. It included the 401st, 428th, and 534th Rifle Regiments, the 604th Artillery Regiment, and smaller support units. The division was under the command of Lieutenant Colonel Ivan Alekseevich Manuilov (promoted to colonel on April 30, 1945) from its formation until at least August 26, 1945. The division was still in 17th Corps when the Soviet invasion of Manchuria began in August, 1945, but that Corps was now part of the 5th Army. While the other division of the corps, the 187th Rifle Division, launched a frontal attack, the division encircled positions of the Japanese 284th Infantry Regiment of the 128th Division at Lotzokou from the south on 15 August. Late on the next day both divisions, in cooperation with a brigade of the 10th Mechanized Corps, pushed the Japanese forces out of Lotzokou and the Taipingling Pass. On September 19, 1945, the division was recognized for its service in the campaign with the award of the Order of the Red Banner. It was disbanded within weeks in accordance with the September 10 order that created the Primorsky Military District.
