= 17th Rifle Corps =

- Active: 1st formation: 1922 – August 1941; 2nd formation: December 1942 – October 1945; 3rd formation: September 1949 – June 1957
- Country: Soviet Union
- Branch: Soviet Red Army
- Engagements: World War II; Invasion of Poland; Eastern Front; Operation Barbarossa; Invasion of Manchuria

The 17th Rifle Corps was a corps of the Red Army and later the Soviet Army, formed three times.

It was first formed in 1922 in the Soviet Far East before relocating to Ukraine two years later. It fought in the Soviet invasion of Poland and was destroyed during Operation Barbarossa in mid-1941. The corps was reformed in late 1942 in the Far East and fought in the Soviet invasion of Manchuria in August 1945 before being disbanded postwar later that year. It was formed for a third time in 1949 at Samarkand in the Turkestan Military District, becoming the 17th Army Corps in 1957. The 17th Army Corps relocated to Frunze in the Central Asian Military District in the late 1960s, serving there for the rest of the Cold War. After the Dissolution of the Soviet Union, it became the headquarters of the Ministry of Defense of Kyrgyzstan.

== First formation ==
The corps was initially first formed as the Primorsky Rifle Corps at Chita on 2 November 1922, part of the 5th Army. On 25 December, the corps became the 17th Primorsky Rifle Corps. In January 1924, the corps was relocated west to Vinnytsia on the other side of the Soviet Union, where it became part of the Ukrainian Military District and dropped the "Primorsky" designation. In May 1935, the 17th became part of the Kiev Military District when the Ukrainian Military District was split. As part of the 6th Army, the corps fought in the Soviet invasion of Poland in September 1939, occupying what became western Ukraine. After the end of the campaign in October, the corps headquarters was stationed at Chernivtsi and it became part of the Kiev Special Military District. Assigned to the 12th Army in May 1940, the corps fought against Operation Barbarossa, the German invasion of the Soviet Union, from 22 June 1941. The corps was disbanded in August of that year.

== Second formation ==
It was reformed in December 1942 in the Far East, part of the 25th Army. In August 1945 in the Far East it had the 187th Rifle Division and 366th Rifle Division. For the Soviet invasion of Manchuria in August 1945, the corps was transferred to the 5th Army. At the beginning of the invasion, the corps advanced in the 5th Army's first echelon. Its objective was to cut off the Japanese Northeastern and Eastern (Suifenho) Fortified Regions, alongside the 105th Fortified Area and several border guard battalions.

On the first day of the invasion, 9 August, the 187th Division fought in heavy combat for the control of railroad tunnels east of Suifenho, which were rapidly secured. The corps advanced southwards into the rear of the Suifenho Fortified Region, where they linked up with troops from the 25th Army's 39th Rifle Corps, completing the encirclement of the Tungning Fortified Region. The speedy Soviet advance prevented the Japanese troops from creating new defensive lines and from effectively resisting the attack. At 17:00 on the same day, the corps was transferred to the 25th Army. After clearing the remaining Japanese troops from Tungning on 10 August, the 17th and 39th Corps began advancing southwest along the Tungning road to Wangching, Tumen, Tunhua, and Kirin on the next day. The two corps approached Laoheishan by noon on 12 August after marching between 18.6 and 25 miles 18.6–25 miles (29.9–40.2 km).

For the next few days, the 10th Mechanized Corps and the two rifle corps advanced along the narrow road from Laoheishan to Heitosai, which forced the column to become strung out along the road. As a result, only the forward detachments and reconnaissance units met the negligible Japanese resistance before capturing Heitosai. 25th Army commander Ivan Chistyakov split the units in two columns, one of which included the 17th Corps and elements of the 10th Mechanized, advancing west towards the Taipingling Pass. The Soviet troops encountered Japanese defensive positions from the 128th Infantry Division's 284th Infantry Regiment at Lotzokou on 15 August. The 187th Division conducted a frontal attack while the 366th encircled the Japanese from the south. Meanwhile, the 10th Corps' 72nd Mechanized Brigade bypassed the Japanese and advanced east to Taipingling Pass, where they were halted by the 285th Infantry Regiment of the 128th, which had constructed prepared defensive positions.

In the late evening of 16 August, the Soviet forces were able to capture both Lotzokou and Taipingling Pass after breaking through the Japanese defenses, continuing to pursue the remnants of the 128th Division westwards. Two days later, the corps followed behind the 10th Mechanized Corps in linking up with the forward elements of the 5th Army at Tungchingcheng after an advance of 18.6 miles (29.9 km). The corps was disbanded in October 1945.

== Third formation and 17th Army Corps ==
In September 1949, the 17th Rifle Corps was reformed at Samarkand in the Turkestan Military District as part of a buildup of the Soviet Army. It initially included the 16th Guards Mechanized Division at Samarkand and the 360th Rifle Division at Termez. The 203rd Rifle Division at Karaganda also became part of the corps in 1949. In 1955, the 360th was renumbered as the 62nd Rifle Division, and the 203rd became the 30th. In 1957, the 62nd became the 108th Motor Rifle Division, the 203rd became the 102nd, and the 16th Guards the 90th Guards Motor Rifle Division.

The corps became the 17th Army Corps in June of that year. In May 1962, the division became a training unit and was directly subordinated to the district headquarters. In the late 1960s, the corps headquarters moved to Frunze in the newly reformed Central Asian Military District, and took control of three motor rifle divisions: the 201st in Dushanbe, the 8th Guards (recently relocated from Tallinn to Frunze), and the 68th (moved from Uryupinsk to Taldykurgan). It also included two separate motor rifle regiments: the 30th at Korday and the 860th at Osh.

In January 1980, the 860th Separate Motor Rifle Regiment was sent to the 40th Army to fight in the Soviet–Afghan War. It was replaced by the 32nd Separate Motor Rifle Regiment, which transferred from Ordzhonikidze and soon became the 68th Separate Motor Rifle Brigade, the only Soviet Army mountain brigade. In February, the 201st Motor Rifle Division was also sent to Afghanistan, and was replaced by the 134th Motor Rifle Division, expanded from the former's 92nd Motor Rifle and 401st Tank Regiments. With three divisions and a brigade, the corps was equal in size to some combined arms armies. In the late 1980s, smaller corps units included the 789th Separate Protection and Security Company, and the 78th Material Support Brigade at Frunze, the 751st Separate Engineer-Sapper Battalion at Kalchagay, and the 13th Machine Gun Artillery Regiment, 179th Separate Reactive Artillery Battalion, and a separate radio-electronic warfare battalion at Sary-Ozek. In January 1989, after the Central Asian Military District was disbanded, the corps became part of the Turkestan Military District again. On 24 August, the 30th Regiment became part of the 8th Guards Division.

After the Dissolution of the Soviet Union, in the summer of 1992, the corps headquarters became the headquarters of the Ministry of Defense of Kyrgyzstan.

=== Unit listing c1988 ===
Corps Command and Headquarters (Управление корпуса и штаб) – Frunze

- 789th Separate Staff Security and Support Company (789-я отдельная рота охраны и обеспечения) – Frunze
- 525th Separate SpetsNaz Company (525-я отдельная рота спецназа) – Frunze (GRU formation operationally attached to the army)
- Separate Electronic Warfare Battalion (отдельный батальон РЭБ) – Sary-Ozek (EW Directorate of the General Staff's unit)
- 342nd Separate Signals Battalion (342-й отдельный батальон связи) – Frunze
- 303rd Separate Helicopter Squadron (303-я отдельная вертолётная эскадрилья) – Dushanbe
- 30th Separate Motor Rifle Regiment (30-й отдельный мотострелковый полк) – Rybachye (became part of the 8th MRD on August 24, 1989)
- 78th Rocket Brigade (78-я ракетная бригада) – Unguras
- 13th Gun Artillery Regiment (13-й пушечный артиллерийский полк) – Sary-Ozek
- 179th Separate Multiple Rocket Launcher Artillery Battalion (179-й отдельный реактивный артиллерийский дивизион) – Sary-Ozek
- 186th Separate Air Defence Missile and Artillery Battalion (186-й отдельный зенитный ракетно-артиллерийский дивизион) – Osh
- 751st Separate Sapper Engineer Battalion (751-й отдельный инженерно-сапёрный батальон) – Kapchagay
- 78th Material Supply Brigade (78-я бригада материального обеспечения) – Frunze
- Separate Pack Animals Transport Company (отдельная вьючно-транспортная рота) – Osh
- 8th Guards Rezhitskaya Motorized Rifle Division, awarded the Order of Lenin, the Order of the Red Banner and the Order of Suvorov, named after the Hero of the Soviet Union Major-General I. V. Panfilov (8-я гвардейская мотострелковая Режицкая ордена Ленина, Краснознамённая, ордена Суворова дивизия имени Героя Советского Союза генерал-майора И. В. Панфилова) – Frunze
  - 41st Separate Guards Signal Battalion (41-й отдельный гвардейский батальон связи) – Rybachye
  - 282nd Guards Motor Rifle Regiment (282-й гвардейский мотострелковый полк) – Frunze
  - 4th Motor Rifle Regiment (4-й мотострелковый полк) – Rybachye
  - 23rd Guards Motor Rifle Regiment (23-й гвардейский мотострелковый полк) – Korday
  - 50th Guards Tank Regiment (50-й гвардейский танковый полк) – Korday
  - 14th Guards Artillery Regiment (14-й гвардейский артиллерийский полк) – Rybachye
  - 1059th Guards Air Defence Missile Regiment (1059-й гвардейский зенитно-ракетный полк) – Korday
  - Separate Ballistic Missile Battalion (отдельный ракетный дивизион) – Rybachye
  - Separate Anti-Tank Battalion (отдельный противотанковый дивизион) – Rybachye
  - 793rd Separate Reconnaissance Battalion (793-й отдельный разведывательный батальон) – Rybachye
  - 32nd Separate Guards Sapper Engineer Battalion (32-й отдельный гвардейский инженерно-сапёрный батальон) – Rybachye
  - Separate Chemical Defence Company (отдельный рота химической защиты) – Rybachye
  - 300th Separate Repair and Overhaul Battalion (300-й отдельный ремонтно-восстановительный батальон) – Korday
  - Separate Medical Battalion (отдельный медицинский батальон) – Rybachye
  - Separate Material Supply Battalion (отдельный батальон материального обеспечения) – Rybachye
- 68th Red Banner Novgorodskaya Motor Rifle Division (68-я мотострелковая Новгородская Краснознамённая дивизия) – Sary-Ozek
  - 549th Separate Signals Battalion (549-й отдельный батальон связи) – Sary-Ozek
  - 188th Motor Rifle Regiment (188-й мотострелковый полк) – Sary-Ozek
  - 385th Motor Rifle Regiment (385-й мотострелковый полк) – Burunday
  - 517th Motor Rifle Regiment (517-й мотострелковый полк) – Taldıqorğan
  - 310th Tank Regiment (310-й танковый полк) – Sary-Ozek
  - 343rd Artillery Regiment (343-й артиллерийский полк) – Sary-Ozek
  - 1164th Air Defence Artillery Regiment (1164-й зенитный артиллерийский полк) – Sary-Ozek
  - Separate Ballistic Missile Battalion (отдельный ракетный дивизион) – Sary-Ozek
  - Separate Anti-Tank Battalion (отдельный противотанковый дивизион) – Sary-Ozek
  - 106th Separate Reconnaissance Battalion (106-й отдельный разведывательный батальон) – Burunday
  - 227th Separate Sapper Engineer Battalion (227-й отдельный инженерно-сапёрный батальон) – Sary-Ozek
  - 81st Separate Chemical Defence Battalion (81-й отдельный батальон химзащиты) – Sary-Ozek
  - Separate Repair and Overhaul Battalion (отдельный ремонтно-восстановительный батальон) – Sary-Ozek
  - 8th Separate Medical Battalion (8-й отдельный медицинский батальон) – Sary-Ozek
  - 395th Separate Material Supply Battalion (395-й отдельный батальон материального обеспечения) – Sary-Ozek
- 134th Motor Rifle Division (134-я мотострелковая дивизия) – Dushanbe
  - Separate Signals Battalion (отдельный батальон связи) – Dushanbe
  - 92nd Motor Rifle Regiment (92-й мотострелковый полк) – Dushanbe
  - 806th Motor Rifle Regiment (806-й мотострелковый полк) – Bokhtar
  - 1208th Motor Rifle Regiment (1208-й мотострелковый полк) – Kulob
  - 401st Tank Regiment (401-й танковый полк) – Dushanbe
  - Artillery Regiment (артиллерийский полк) – Dushanbe
  - 990th Air Defence Artillery Regiment (990-й зенитный артиллерийский полк) – Dushanbe
  - 837th Separate Ballistic Missile Battalion (837-й отдельный ракетный дивизион) – Bokhtar
  - Separate Anti-Tank Battalion (отдельный противотанковый дивизион) – Dushanbe
  - Separate Reconnaissance Battalion (отдельный разведывательный батальон) – Dushanbe
  - Separate Sapper Engineer Battalion (отдельный инженерно-сапёрный батальон) – Dushanbe
  - Separate Chemical Defence Company (отдельная рота химической защиты) – Dushanbe
  - Separate Repair and Overhaul Battalion (отдельный ремонтно-восстановительный батальон) – Dushanbe
  - Separate Medical Battalion (отдельный медицинский батальон) – Dushanbe
  - Separate Material Supply Battalion (отдельный батальон материального обеспечения) – Dushanbe
- 68th Separate Motor Rifle Brigade (mountain) (68-я отдельная мотострелковая бригада (горная)) – Osh

== Organization ==
1939:

- 96th Rifle Division
- 97th Rifle Division
- 10th Tank Brigade
- 38th Tank Brigade

1941:

- 60th Mountain Rifle Division
- 96th Mountain Rifle Division
- 164th Rifle Division

== Commanders ==
The following officer is known to have commanded the corps' first formation:

- Major General Ivan Galanin (14 March–26 August 1941)

The corps' second formation is known to have been commanded by the following officers:

- Major General Afanasy Kopychko (16 December 1942–5 July 1945)
- Lieutenant General Nikolay Nikitin (5 July 1945–July 1946)

The corps' third formation and the 17th Army Corps were commanded by the following officers:

- Major General Grigory Belov (19 September 1949 – 23 July 1954)
- Major General Nikolay Chunikhin (23 July 1954–June 1955)
- Major General Sergey Kuznetsov (June 1955 – 25 September 1958)
- Major General Anatoly Andrushchenko (26 September 1958 – 24 February 1961)
- Major General Yegor Kruglov (25 February 1961 – 3 December 1964)
- Major General (promoted to Lieutenant General 23 February 1967) Nikolay Silchenko (4 December 1964 – 28 July 1967)
- Major General (promoted to Lieutenant General 29 April 1970) Sergey Borisov (29 July 1967 – 6 December 1971)
- Major General (promoted to Lieutenant General 4 November 1973) Vladimir Myakushko (6 December 1971–May 1975)
- Major General Fyodor Kuzmin (December 1982–September 1984)
- Major General Ivan Bizhan (November 1984–June 1987)
- Major General Viktor Kazantsev (1988–1990)
