= 60th Motor Rifle Brigade =

Russian Ground Forces formation

60th Separate Red Banner Order of Kutuzov 3rd Class Motor Rifle Brigade (2010–present) 218th Tank Regiment (1945–2010) 218th Tank Brigade (1942–1945)
- 60-я отдельная Краснознамённая ордена Кутузова III степени мотострелковая бригада
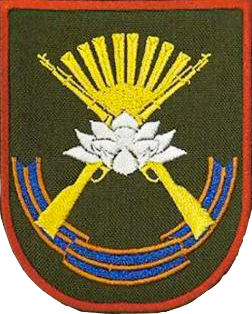
- Sleeve patch of the brigade
- Active: 31 July 1942–present
- Country: Soviet Union (until 1991); Russia
- Branch: Soviet Army (until 1991); Russian Ground Forces
- Type: Motorized infantry
- Size: Brigade
- Part of: 5th Guards Combined Arms Army
- Garrison/HQ: Monastyrishche, Primorsky Krai
- Engagements: Soviet–Japanese War; Russian invasion of Ukraine; 2023 Ukrainian counteroffensive
- Decorations: Order of the Red Banner; Order of Kutuzov 3rd class

The 60th Separate Red Banner Order of Kutuzov 3rd Class Motor Rifle Brigade (Russian: 60-я отдельная Краснознамённая ордена Кутузова III степени мотострелковая бригада) is a unit of the Russian Ground Forces. It traces its history back to the Soviet 218th Tank Brigade, which took part in the Soviet–Japanese War. It is part of the 5th Combined Arms Army.

== History ==
The 60th Motor Rifle Brigade originates from the 218th Tank Brigade, which was formed on 31 July 1942 as part of the 25th Army. The brigade spent the war on the Far Eastern Front and didn't see combat until 9 August 1945, when it was subordinated to the 5th Army and took part in the Harbin–Kirin Operation.

On 8 December 1945, the 218th Tank Brigade was reformed into the 218th Tank Regiment of the 2nd Tank Division (Military Unit Number 16871).

In 2010, during the reorganization of the Russian army, the 218th Tank Red Banner Regiment was reformed into the 60th Separate Motor Rifle Brigade and became part of the 5th Combined Arms Army, while the division it was attached to (then named the 127th Machine Gun Artillery Division) was reformed into the 59th Separate Motor Rifle Brigade.

In 2013, the brigade took part in the relief efforts during the flood in the Far East. The brigade is decorated with orders of Red Banner and Kutuzov 3rd class. The unit used to occupy the former headquarters of the now disbanded 29th Motor Rifle Division in Kamen-Rybolov before being transferred to the village of Monastyrische, Primorsky Krai, in 2013.

During the Russian invasion of Ukraine, the brigade was stationed south of Donetsk and repelled the 2023 Ukrainian counteroffensive in the Vremivka region.
