= 365th Rifle Division =

WWII Red Army unit

365th Rifle Division (1 September 1941 – 18 March 1942) 365th Rifle Division (15 November 1944 – 1946)
- Active: 1941–1946
- Country: Soviet Union
- Branch: Red Army
- Type: Division
- Role: Infantry
- Engagements: Battle of Moscow; Battles of Rzhev; Sychyovka-Vyazma Offensive; Soviet invasion of Manchuria
- Decorations: Order of the Red Banner (2nd Formation)

Commanders
- Notable commanders: Col. Matvei Aleksandrovich Shchukin; Col. Mikhail Kirillovich Gvozdikov

The 365th Rifle Division began forming on 1 September 1941, as a standard Red Army rifle division, in the Sverdlovsk Oblast. After forming, it was assigned to the 30th Army of Western Front, served briefly in the defense of Moscow, and played a role in the liberation of Klin, and later in the near-encirclement of the German 9th Army around Rzhev in the winter counteroffensive of 1941–42. In late January 1942, it was transferred to the 29th Army of Kalinin Front, which was very soon after encircled by German forces near Sychevka, and on 18 March the division was disbanded due to very heavy losses. In November 1944, a new 365th Rifle Division was formed in the Far Eastern Front, based on the 29th Rifle Brigade, and saw action in the Soviet invasion of Manchuria in August 1945, being awarded the Order of the Red Banner for its services.

== 1st Formation ==
The division began forming on 1 September 1941 in the Urals Military District in the Sverdlovsk Oblast. Its basic order of battle was as follows:

- 1211th Rifle Regiment
- 1213th Rifle Regiment
- 1215th Rifle Regiment
- 927th Artillery Regiment

Col. Matvei Aleksandrovich Shchukin was assigned to command of the division on the day it began forming. It spent nearly three months in the Urals forming and training, but was still far from complete when it was sent west in late November. When it reached the front it had only 30 of the 104 medium and heavy mortars authorized, was lacking nearly 100 trucks, was short of antitank guns and had no sapper (engineer) battalion organized at all.

By the end of 30 November the division had arrived as a reinforcement, along with the 82nd Cavalry Division, for the 30th Army, in Western Front. By the morning of 3 December the Army's units were completing a partial regrouping, facing the German 86th Infantry and 36th Motorized Divisions and an SS brigade; the 365th was concentrated in the area 20 km east of Konakovo.

On the morning of 6 December, as ordered by Western Front, 30th Army went over to the offensive, overcoming stubborn German resistance. The Army's main blow was aimed at Klin, with the 365th, backed by 8th Tank Brigade, commanded by Col. P. A. Rotmistrov, and 371st Rifle Division, supported by 21st Tank Brigade. By the end of the day this attack liberated the area of Borshchevo. The offensive continued over the next two days and was threatening to cut the Klin–Leningrad road and envelop the city from the northeast. The defending German 7th Panzer and 14th Motorized Divisions were by now falling back. On the morning of 12 December the 365th and the 8th Tank Brigade were counterattacked out of Klin and Vysokovsk by the two motorized divisions, supported by 40 tanks and aerial attacks, forcing them to pull back to the southern edge of the woods north of Golyadi, Polukhanovo and Maidanovo. Over the next three days the Soviet objective was to encircle Klin to destroy the German forces defending it, but cooperation between 30th and 1st Shock Armies was difficult to maintain. In the end, most of the defenders were able to withdraw, with heavy losses, and the city was liberated on 15 December by the 371st and 365th Divisions and their supporting troops. From 9 to 15 December the two Armies captured 82 tanks, 18 armored cars, 750 cars and trucks, 80 guns, 120 mortars, 250 machine guns, 800 submachine guns, up to 10,000 shells, and about 2 million small arms rounds.

Shortly after, 30th Army was transferred to Kalinin Front. Even facing the weakened German forces during this campaign, Soviet losses were high due to little effective artillery support and lack of expertise; by the turn of the year the rifle divisions of Kalinin Front averaged less than 3,700 men. Beginning on 8 January 1942, this Army took part in the Sychevka–Vyasma Offensive Operation, which was planned "to encircle, and then capture or destroy the enemy's entire Mozhaisk – Gzhatsk – Vyasma grouping", that is, what later became known as the Rzhev salient. At the end of January the 365th was transferred to the 29th Army, still in Kalinin Front, attacking towards Sychevka. Within days forces of the German 9th Army encircled 29th Army. Over the next six weeks the Army struggled behind enemy lines, attempting to reestablish communications or at least to break out. On 15 March Colonel Shchukin left command of the division to Col. Aleksandr Aleksandrovich Vetlugin, but on 18 March the 365th was officially disbanded.

== 2nd Formation ==
On 15 November 1944, a new 365th was formed, this time based on the 2nd formation of the 29th Rifle Brigade.

=== 29th Rifle Brigade ===
==== 1st Formation ====
This brigade began forming for the first time at Gorkii in the Moscow Military District in October 1941. It was based on a cadre of reserve (training) units from the Siberian Military District. It was under the command of Col. Mikhail Emilianovich Yerokhin. In late November it was assigned to the 1st Shock Army, and when the winter counteroffensive began on 6 December it was concentrated in the Dmitrov area. Over the next nine days the 29th helped drive elements of the 7th Panzer Division back more than 40 km, and on the 15th it took part in the liberation of Klin. In recognition of this and its other exploits in the early stages of the counteroffensive, the 29th was redesignated as the 1st Guards Rifle Brigade on 2 January 1942. In the summer of that year this brigade would be formed into the 42nd Guards Rifle Division.

==== 2nd Formation ====
A new 29th Rifle Brigade was formed in July 1942, in the 59th Rifle Corps of the 1st Red Banner Army of the Far Eastern Front. It remained under those headquarters through until late 1944. In preparation for the coming offensive against the Japanese forces in Manchuria a series of new rifle divisions were being formed in the far east, and from 26 to 15 November December, the 29th Brigade was officially disbanded and reorganized as the new 365th Rifle Division. The 199th Rifle Regiment of the corps' 39th Rifle Division was also used to form the new division, which included the 397th, 477th, and 501st Rifle Regiments as well as the 577th Artillery Regiment and smaller support units.

=== Invasion of Manchuria and Postwar ===
The new division was under the command of Colonel Mikhail Kirillovich Gvozdikov from its formation until after 3 September 1945. The division was still in 59th Corps when the Soviet invasion of Manchuria began in August 1945. It advanced behind the 39th Rifle Division on the right flank of the army in the corps second echelon from 10 August, crossing the Muling River. After the 39th and a tank brigade captured Linkou on 13 August, the 365th was tasked with driving elements of the Japanese 365th Infantry Regiment of the 135th Division from positions north of Linkou, which was accomplished by 17 August.

On 19 September 1945, the division was recognized for its service in the campaign with the award of the Order of the Red Banner. Along with the 35th Army headquarters, it was ordered disbanded in late September 1945 in accordance with the order that established the Primorsky Military District. This was modified instead and in October it became an NKVD division.
