= 20th Guards Brigade =

20th Guards Brigade may refer to:

- 20th Guards Motor Rifle Brigade, Soviet Union/Russia
- 20th Guards Rocket Brigade, Soviet Union/Russia
- 20th Guards Brigade (United Kingdom), also known as the 20th Independent Infantry Brigade

== See also ==
- 20th Brigade (disambiguation)
