= 14th Tank Division (Soviet Union, 1940–1941) =

Tank division of the Soviet Ground Forces

- 14-я танковая дивизия
- Active: 1940–1941
- Country: Soviet Union
- Branch: Red Army
- Type: Tank division
- Role: Armoured warfare
- Size: Division
- Garrison/HQ: Zaporizhzhia Oblast, Ukrainian SSR
- Colors: Red

The 14th Tank Division (14-я танковая дивизия) was an armoured formation of the Red Army active during the early stages of the Second World War. It formed part of the 10th Mechanized Corps within the 6th Army of the Kiev Special Military District. The division participated in the opening battles of Operation Barbarossa in June 1941 before being destroyed in combat later that year.

== History ==
The 14th Tank Division was created in early 1940 as part of the reorganization of Soviet armoured forces following the Winter War. It was assembled from existing tank brigades and reserve regiments stationed in the Ukrainian SSR. Like many early-war formations, it struggled with shortages of modern tanks, trained crews, and logistical coordination.

When Operation Barbarossa began on 22 June 1941, the division was part of the 10th Mechanized Corps positioned near the western Ukrainian border. It soon engaged German forces in the Brody–Dubno battles, one of the largest early tank clashes on the Eastern Front. Despite strong counter-attacks, the division suffered heavy casualties due to Luftwaffe air superiority, lack of fuel and ammunition, and mechanical failures of its older tanks. Archival data indicate that by 30 June 1941 the division fielded 9 146 personnel and 293 tanks.

By mid-July 1941 the division had been reduced to fragments. Surviving personnel were pulled eastward, with remnants integrated into other Red Army units. The formation was officially disbanded between 8 and 19 August 1941 as part of the general Soviet withdrawal toward the Dnieper River.

== Organisation ==
The 14th Tank Division followed the 1940 table of organisation for Soviet tank divisions, which prescribed two tank regiments, one motorized rifle regiment, an artillery regiment, and supporting reconnaissance, engineer, and signal battalions. However, chronic shortages meant the 14th rarely reached its intended strength. At the time of the German invasion, most of its tanks were older BT-7 and T-26 models rather than the newer T-34 or KV-1.

== Commanders ==
The division’s initial commanding officer is not clearly documented in surviving wartime records. Leadership within the 10th Mechanized Corps changed frequently as officers were lost or reassigned during the chaotic opening weeks of the German invasion.

== Legacy ==
The 14th Tank Division was not re-formed after 1941. Its destruction was typical of the Red Army’s early-war mechanized corps, many of which were encircled and annihilated in the first months of the conflict. The division’s numerical designation was later reused in the post-war period for other Soviet armoured formations, including a unit established in 1974 in the North Caucasus Military District, reorganised in 1989 as the 100th Operational Division.

== See also ==
- Operation Barbarossa
- 10th Mechanized Corps (Soviet Union)
