= Filipp Parusinov =

Fillip Alekseevich Parusinov
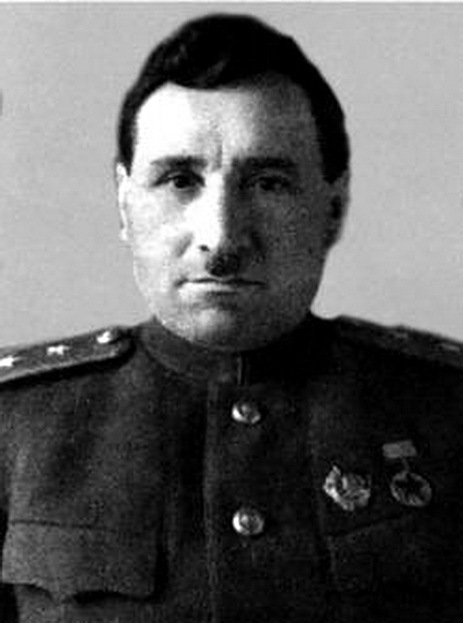
- Born: November 27, 1893; Bobrovsky Uyezd, Voronezh Governorate, Russian Empire
- Died: October 25, 1973 (aged 79) Moscow, Soviet Union
- Allegiance: Russian Empire; Soviet Union
- Branch: Imperial Russian Army; Soviet Red Army
- Service years: 1914–1917 (Russian Empire); 1918–1956 (Soviet Union)
- Rank: lieutenant general
- Commands: 12th Army; 13th Army; 25th Army; Maritime Group of Forces
- Conflicts: World War I; Russian Civil War; World War II; Winter War; Soviet–Japanese War

Fillip Alekseevich Parusinov (November 27, 1893 – October 25, 1973) was a Soviet army group commander. He fought in the Imperial Russian Army during World War I before going over to the Bolsheviks in the subsequent civil war. He was promoted to Polkovnik (colonel) in 1935, Kombrig (brigade commander) in 1937, Komdiv (division commander) in 1938 and Komkor (corps commander) in 1939. He fought in the wars against Finland, Nazi Germany and the Empire of Japan. He retired in 1956 at the age of 63.

Preceded by New office	Commander of the Maritime Group of Forces; July 1943 – July 1945	Succeeded by Kirill Meretskov

== Literature ==
- Жуков Г. К. Воспоминания и размышления. В 3-х тт. — 10-е изд., доп. по рукописи автора. — М.: Новости, 1990. — С. 274—277. — ISBN 5-7020-0074-9 ; 5-7020-0075-7
- Мельтюхов М. И. (2006). Освободительный поход Сталина. М.: Яуза; Эксмо. ISBN 5-699-17275-0.
- Командный и начальствующий состав Красной Армии в 1940—1941 гг. Структура и кадры центрального аппарата HКО СССР, военных округов и общевойсковых армий. Документы и материалы. — М.; СПб.: Летний сад, 2005. — ISBN 5-94381-137-0
- Краснознамённый Киевский. Очерки истории Краснознамённого Киевского военного округа (1919—1979). — 2-е изд., испр. и доп. — Киев: Изд-во политической литературы Украины, 1979.
- Мельтюхов М. И. Упущенный шанс Сталина. Советский Союз и борьба за Европу: 1939—1941. — М.: Вече, 2000. — ISBN 5-7838-0590-4
- Мельтюхов М. И. Советско-польские войны. Военно-политическое противостояние 1918—1939 гг. — Ч. 3: Сентябрь 1939 года. Война с запада. — М.: Яуза; Эксмо, 2001. — ISBN 5-699-07637-9
- Военный энциклопедический словарь. — М.: Воениздат, 1984.
