= 1st Front =

1st Front may refer to major formations of the Soviet Army during World War II:

- 1st Baltic Front
- 1st Belorussian Front
- 1st Far Eastern Front
- 1st Ukrainian Front
