= 40th Rifle Division =

40th Rifle Division (1930–1957) 40th Motor Rifle Division
- Active: 1930–1996
- Country: Soviet Union (1925–1992); Russia (1992–1996)
- Branch: Red Army (1930-1946); Soviet Army (1946–1991); Russian Ground Forces (1991–1996)
- Type: Infantry
- Size: Division
- Engagements: Battle of Lake Khasan; World War II; Invasion of Manchuria
- Decorations: Order of Lenin; Order of Suvorov
- Battle honours: "named for Sergo Ordzhonikidze"

The 40th Rifle Division was an infantry division of the Red Army during World War II. It gained the honorific "named for Sergo Ordzhonikidze" on 14 April 1937. It fought in the engagements at Lake Khasan. On 22 June 1941, it was part of the 39th Rifle Corps, 25th Army, in the Far East Military District. The division fought in the Soviet invasion of Manchuria in 1945. In 1957, it was converted into a motorized rifle division. From 1957 to 1989 it was based at Smolyaninovo-1, Primorskiy Krai. In 1989 it was transferred to the Pacific Fleet as a coastal defence division. It was disbanded in 1996.

== History ==
The 40th Rifle Division was formed on 16 April 1930 as a territorial division from the 7th Krasnoyarsk Territorial Rifle Regiment in Krasnoyarsk, Achinsk and Kansk. In January 1932, it was transferred to the Special Red Banner Far Eastern Army (OKDVA) and in October was moved to Razdolny, Nadezhdinsky District, Primorsky Krai. By February 1934, it was based in Posyet, Slavyanka, Novokievka and Barabash in the Khasan district of Primorsky Krai.

In the spring of 1936 the division and the cadre units of the 13th Rifle Division from the North Caucasus Military District were used to form the 92nd Rifle Division. The 40th and 92nd Rifle Divisions became part of the new 39th Rifle Corps of the OKDVA on 31 May 1936. It was given the honorific "named for Sergo Ordzhonikidze" on 14 April 1937. During late July and the early August 1938, the division fought in the Battle of Lake Khasan under the command of Colonel V.K. Bazarov. For its actions in the battle, it was awarded the Order of Lenin on 25 October 1938.

On 22 June 1941, the division was part of the 39th Rifle Corps of the 25th Army of the Far Eastern Front.

During August 1945, it fought in the Soviet invasion of Manchuria as part of the 39th Rifle Corps. Its 3rd Rifle Regiment, commanded by Lieutenant Colonel Mikhail Abramov, crossed the border in the Grodekovo region of Primorsky Krai and cut the railway line in the Japanese rear. It fought in the battle for Laoling pass. During the Harbin–Kirin Operation, the division had broken the Japanese defences by 10 August and advanced 20 km. On 11 August, the division helped capture Laoheyshan and Hunchun. In conjunction with a 12 August amphibious assault by forces of the Pacific Fleet, the division captured Unga and Najin on the eastern coast of Korea. On 15 August, they captured Wangqing, Chongjin on 16 August, Rana and Yanji on 17 August after the Japanese surrender. In October, the division was sent to Hoyren in North Korea, where it remained until February 1946. For its actions during the campaign, the division was awarded the Order of Suvorov 2nd class on 19 September 1945.

On 17 May 1957, the division became a motorized rifle division. Its 178th Motorized Rifle Regiment was disbanded on 14 March 1958 and replaced by the disbanded 148th Motorized Rifle Division's 411th Motorized Rifle Regiment. On 12 October 1989, it was transferred to the Pacific Fleet as the 40th Motorized Rifle Division for Coastal Defence. The 231st Motorized Rifle Regiment and 1173rd Antiaircraft Missile Regiment were transferred to the 129th Guards Machine-Gun Artillery Division on 12 October 1990. The two regiments were replaced by the 48th Guards Motorized Rifle Regiment and 1133rd Antiaircraft Missile Regiment. In 1996, it was disbanded. During the Cold War, it was based at Smolyaninovo and was maintained at 65% strength.

== Commanders ==
The division was commanded by the following officers.

- Andrei Sazontov (January 1930-February 1932)
- Colonel V.K. Bazarov (1938)
- Stepan Kirillovich Mamonov (3 July 1939 – 24 January 1942)
- Timofey Petrovich Pyryalin (25 January 1942 – 14 November 1942)
- Porfiry Dyakov (17 November 1942 – 22 September 1943)
- Grigory Shanin (23 September 1943 – 25 May 1944)
- Ivan Ponomarenko (26 May-15 December 1944)
- Zakhar Sopeltsev (16 December 1944 – 3 September 1945)

== Composition ==
In 1941, it was composed of the following units.

- 3rd Rifle Regiment
- 178th Rifle Regiment
- 231st Rifle Regiment
- 91st Artillery Regiment
- 107th Howitzer Artillery Regiment
- 53rd Separate Antitank Battalion
- 470th Separate Anti-Aircraft Artillery Battalion
- 23rd Sapper Battalion
- 5th Reconnaissance Company
- 86th Separate Communications Battalion
- 619th Medical and Sanitary Battalion
- 1st Separate Chemical Defense Company
- 362nd Auto Transport Company
- 70th Field Bakery
- 172nd Divisional Veterinary Hospital
- 77th Divisional Artillery Workshop
- 252nd Field Post Office
- 259th Field Ticket Office of the State Bank

In 1988, the 40th Motorized Rifle Division was composed of the following units.

- 3rd Motorized Rifle Regiment
- 231st Motorized Rifle Regiment
- 411th Motorized Rifle Regiment
- 141st Guards Tank Regiment
- 187th Artillery Regiment
- 1173rd Antiaircraft Missile Regiment
- 957th Separate Missile Battalion
- 26th Separate Antitank Artillery Battalion
- 125th Separate Reconnaissance Battalion
- 23rd Separate Engineer-Sapper Battalion
- 86th Separate Communications Battalion
- 52nd Separate Chemical Defence Battalion
- Separate Equipment Maintenance and Recovery Battalion
- 619th Separate Medical Battalion
- 1133rd Separate Material Supply Battalion
