= 20th Guards Rocket Brigade =

Military unit

20th Guards Berlin Twice Red Banner Rocket Brigade
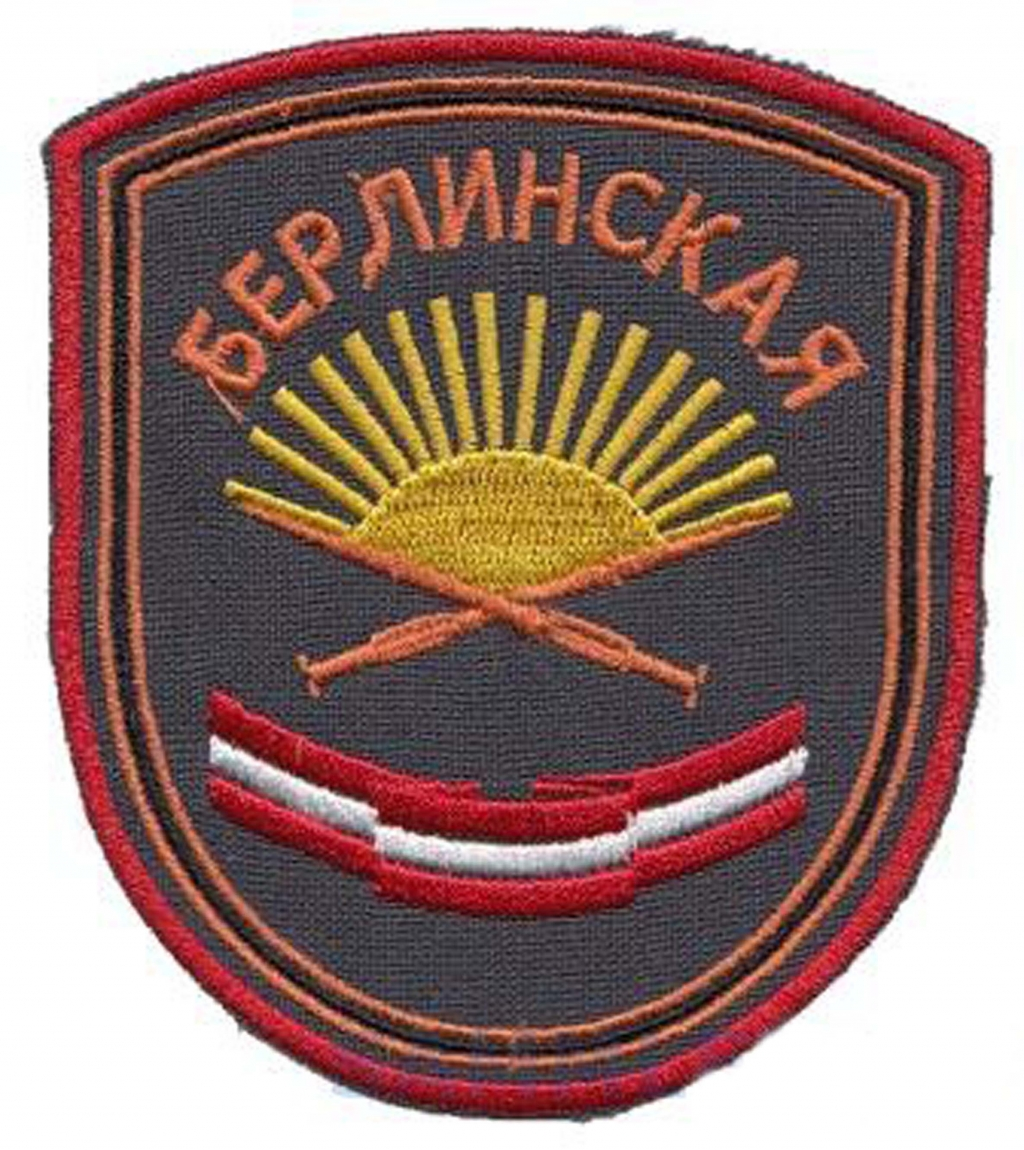
- Active: 1942-present
- Country: Soviet Union (1942–1991); Russia (1991-present)
- Branch: Russian Ground Forces
- Part of: 5th Combined Arms Army
- Garrison/HQ: Ussuriysk, Primorsky Krai
- Decorations: Order of the Red Banner
- Battle honours: Battle of Berlin

The 20th Guards Berlin twice Red Banner Rocket Brigade (Military Unit Number 92088) is a tactical ballistic missile formation of the Russian Ground Forces. The brigade is located in the city of Ussuriysk of Primorsky Krai.

The brigade was established in 1964 and is part of the 5th Combined Arms Army of the Eastern Military District.

== World War II ==
The brigade was formed as the 20th Guards Heavy Mortar Brigade on 19 December 1942 in Moscow, receiving BM-13 Katyusha rocket launchers. Completing its formation, the brigade left for the Voronezh Front by the end of December, joining the 4th Guards Mortar Division. The brigade was presented its Guards banner on 8 July 1943 for "successful fulfillment" of command tasks from 10 January to 1 July 1943. For its "courage and heroism" in the capture of Dukhovshchina the brigade was awarded the Order of the Red Banner on 9 September of that year. The brigade was part of the active army between 11 January 1943 and the end of the war in Europe as part of the 1st Baltic, Voronezh, Leningrad, and 1st Belorussian Fronts. During the Battle of Berlin the brigade expended more than 3,000 rockets against German positions near Tempelhof Airport, the Tiergarten, Anhalter and Potsdamer railway stations and other targets in the city center. On 2 May 1945 servicemen of the unit left their inscriptions and names on the walls of the destroyed Reichstag. The brigade received the Berlin honorific on 11 July in recognition of its courage and bravery in the assault on the city. At the beginning of July the brigade was loaded in echelons at by the end of the month unloaded at the station of Khorol, Primorsky Krai. During the Soviet invasion of Manchuria the brigade provided fire support to the 5th Army of the 1st Far Eastern Front. For its "heroism and valor" in the campaign the brigade was awarded a second Order of the Red Banner on 19 September.

== Cold War and Russian service ==
After the war the brigade was based at Razdolnoye, Primorsky Krai, and was gradually rearmed. Reorganized in October 1959, the brigade was redesignated as the 20th Guards Heavy Rocket Artillery Brigade. In 1964, the brigade was one of the first units to be retrained on the R-17 Elbrus short-range ballistic missile. Having received the Elbrus systems, the brigade relocated to Spassk-Dalny on 9 January of that year, being redesignated as the 20th Guards Missile Brigade. The brigade was the first to conduct an Elbrus launch against naval targets in 1969 and the first to launch the missiles from railway platforms in 1975. The brigade was re-equipped with the Tochka-U missile system in 1998. During the Mobilnost-2004 exercise the brigade was observed by Vladimir Putin, who praised the training of its servicemen. Transitioning away from conscripts with 95 percent of its personnel contract servicemen by 2015, the brigade relocated to Ussuriysk by 2016. The brigade received its set of 12 Iskander-M missile systems in 2016, under a contract signed in 2011.
