= 9th Air Army =

- Active: August 1942 – April 1957
- Disbanded: 1 April 1957
- Country: Soviet Union
- Branch: Air Force
- Engagements: Soviet–Japanese War; Invasion of Manchuria

The 9th Air Army was a military formation of the Soviet Air Forces, active from August 1942 until April 1957, which operated in the Far East.

== History ==
It was formed on August 15, 1942 after an order of the NPO of the USSR of July 27, 1942 on the basis of the Air Forces of the 1st Red Banner Army, 25th Army and 35th Army of the Far Eastern Front.

In August 1945, the 9th Air Army, fortified by the 19th Bomber Corps, entered the 1st Far Eastern Front. The army participated in the Soviet-Japanese War and, in particular, in the Harbin–Kirin Offensive Operation. On August 9, it bombarded military facilities in the areas of Changchun and Harbin, provided air support to the 1st Red Banner and 5th armies in breaking through the defense of the Imperial Japanese Armed Forces.

From August 10 to 17, it supported the advance of the troops of the 1st Far Eastern Front on Harbin and Changchun. Since August 18, the 9th Air Army started using the airfields of Harbin, Kirin, Yanji, Wonsan, Hamhung and others. During its existence, the army made more than 4400 sorties.

The 9th Air Army was renamed the 54th Air Army on January 10, 1949.

According to CIA intelligence, at least two regiments from the formation covertly fought against the United States, South Korea, and their allies in the Korean War.
On April 1, 1957 it was merged with the 29th Air Army on Sahkalin and became part of the 1st Red Banner Air Army.

== Army Commanders ==
- 27.07.1942 - 18.09.1944 : Major General of Aviation Aleksandr Sergeyevich Senatorov
- 18.09.1944 - 28.06.1945 : Major General of Aviation Vasily Vinogradov
- 28.06.1945 - 01.12.1946 : Colonel General of Aviation Ivan Sokolov
- 12.1946 - 03.1949 : Lieutenant-General David Yakovlevich Slobozhan
- 03.1949 - 02.1955 : Lieutenant-General Aleksandr Sergeyevich Senatorov
- 02.1955 - 06.1956 : Lieutenant-General Yuriy Borisovich Rukachev
- 06.1956 - 04.1957 : Lieutenant-General Pavel Borisovich Dankevich
