= 5th Guards Combined Arms Army =

Russian Ground Forces formation

5th Guards Combined Arms Red Banner Order of Zhukov Army
- 5-я гвардейская общевойсковая Краснознамённая, ордена Жукова армия
- Great emblem of the 5th Combined Arms Army
- Active: 1939–Present
- Country: Soviet Union (until 1991); Russia (since 1991)
- Branch: Soviet Army (until 1991); Russian Ground Forces
- Type: Combined Arms
- Size: World War II: usually several corps (~10 divisions) Postwar: 5–7 divisions
- Part of: Eastern Military District
- Garrison/HQ: Ussuriysk
- Engagements: World War II; Invasion of Poland; Eastern Front; Operation Barbarossa; Battle of Moscow; Invasion of Manchuria; Russo-Ukrainian War; 2023 Ukrainian counteroffensive
- Decorations: Order of the Red Banner; Order of Zhukov; Guards

Commanders
- Current commander: Major General Ivan Yeruslanov

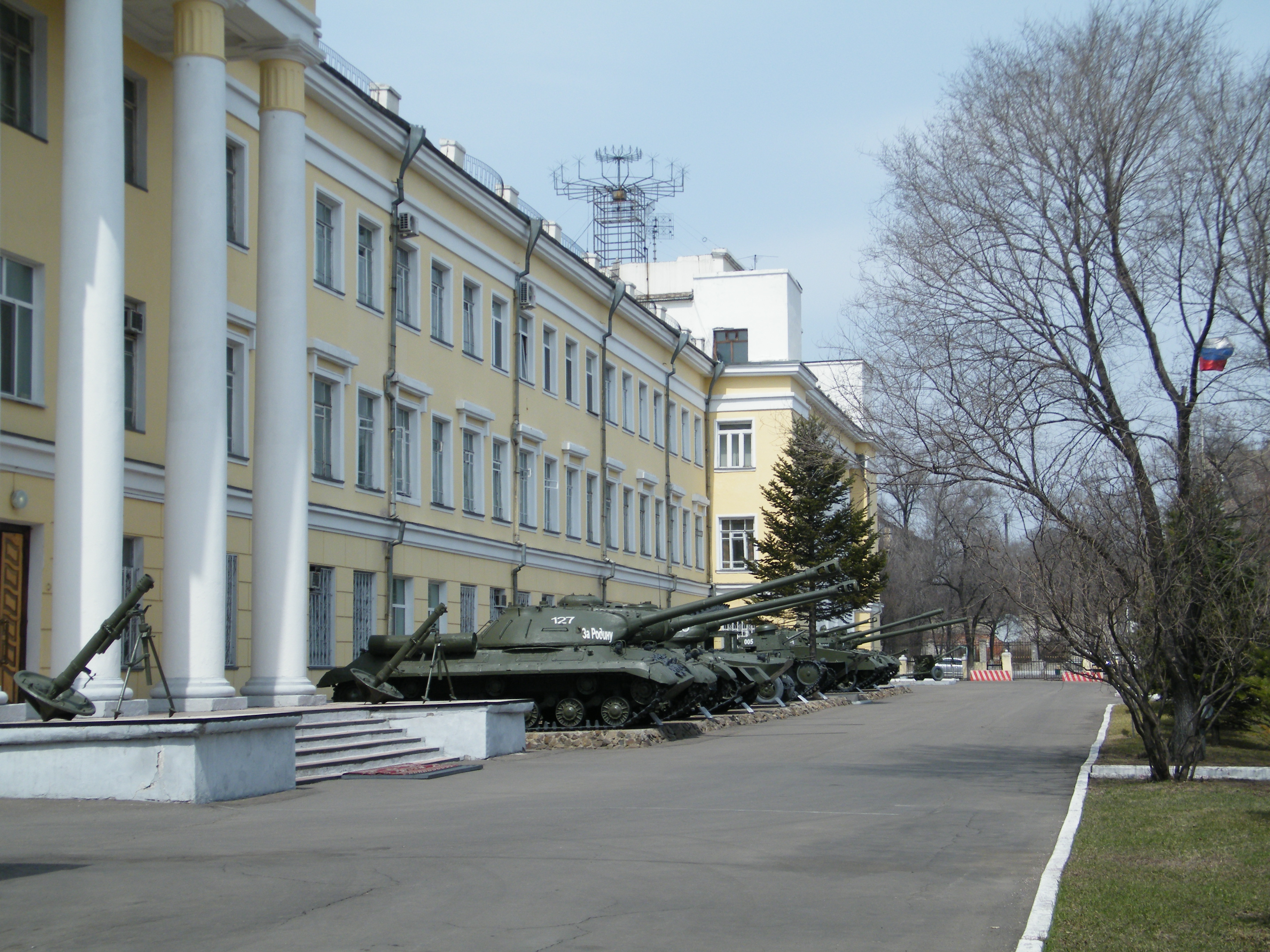
The Army headquarters at Ussuriysk

The 5th Guards Combined Arms Red Banner Order of Zhukov Army (5-я гвардейская общевойсковая Краснознамённая, ордена Жукова армия) is a Russian Ground Forces formation in the Eastern Military District.

It was formed in 1939, served during the Soviet invasion of Poland that year, and was deployed in the southern sector of the Soviet defences when Adolf Hitler's Operation Barbarossa began in June 1941 during World War II. In the disastrous first months of Barbarossa, the 5th Army was encircled and destroyed around Kiev.

Reformed under Lelyushenko and Govorov, it played a part in the last-ditch defence of Moscow, and then in the string of offensive and defensive campaigns that eventually saw the Soviet armies retake all of Soviet territory and push west into Poland and beyond into Germany itself. The 5th Army itself only advanced as far as East Prussia before it was moved east to take part in the Soviet attack on Japan.

Since 1945, under the Soviet and now Russian flag it has formed part of the Far East Military District keeping watch on the border with the People's Republic of China. As the Russian armed force shrank, it found itself part of the larger Eastern Military District in the twenty-first century.

On December 2, 2021, the 5th Army was awarded the Order of Zhukov.

On February 19, 2024, the 25th NBC Protection Regiment was awarded the honorary designation "Guards".

On the 1st of April, 2024, the 5th Army was awarded the honorary designation "Guards".

== Creation and organization ==
The 5th Army was created in August 1939 in the Special Kiev Military District from the Northern (originally Shepetovskaya) Army Group. In September 1939, the 5th Army took part in the Soviet invasion of Poland, which had been justified by the Molotov–Ribbentrop Pact. The Army was originally placed under the command of I.G. Sovietnikov.

On 22 June 1941, the 5th Army consisted of the 15th Rifle Corps (under Colonel I.I. Fedyuninsky and incorporating the 45th Rifle Division and 62nd Rifle Divisions), as well as the 27th Rifle Corps (87th, 125th, 135th Rifle Divisions), the 22nd Mechanised Corps (19th, 41st Tank Divisions, 215th Motorized Division), the 2nd Fortified Region, seven artillery regiments, 2 NKVD border regiments, and an engineer regiment.

== Battle of the frontiers ==
The Army's rifle divisions were assigned to cover the Lutsk-Rovno approaches to the Ukraine and were tasked to man the (unfinished) Kovel, Strumilov, and Vladimir-Volynsk fortified districts. The Army was stationed in barracks up to forty miles from the frontier, and would need three to four days to take up its positions. On 22 June, however, the 15th Rifle Corps managed to take its place in the line, holding the sector from Vlodava to Vladimir-Volynsk, but later that same day, the southern end of the line at Vladimir-Volynsk "began to buckle in," in John Erickson's words.

The main German thrust in the sector came at the junction point between the 5th Army and its neighbour to the south, the 6th Army, and both the 5th and 6th Armies committed their mechanised forces quickly to try to stem the gap, but without success. The Commander Southwestern Front, Mikhail Kirponos, decided to halt this with an attack into the flank of Panzer Group 1 using all the available mobile forces – five mechanised corps. This was unsuccessful in the face of the thrusting German advance, lack of coordination from the various Soviet formations, acute shortage of equipment and spares, and lack of proper equipment, especially radio sets.

Meanwhile, General M.I. Potapov, now commanding the 5th Army, was ordered on 29 June to make another attack on Panzer Group 1's flank from the woods of Klevany. Amid these efforts, Kirponos managed to withdraw most of his Front to a new line almost on the old Soviet/Polish border, and prevented the Germans from rupturing the Soviet defensive line.

The 11th Panzer Division took Berdichev on 7 July, and the juncture between the 5th and 6th Armies was broken; the Stavka ordered Kirponos to withdraw the 5th Army to the Korosten "fortified district" northwest of Kiev. The gap between the 5th and 6th Armies quickly widened to forty miles. To remedy the situation another counterattack was ordered, and Potapov, now commanding the 15th and 31st Rifle, and 9th, 19th and 22nd Mechanised Corps, was directed to strike northwards from Berdichev and Lyubar. However, his forces had been badly worn down: the 9th Mechanised Corps had 64 tanks left, the 22nd less than half that number, and the rifle regiments of 31st Corps had "no more than three hundred men." Nevertheless, Potapov's force cut the Zhitomir highway and kept up the pressure for a week, and afterwards remained as a thorn on the German Sixth Army's northern flank.

By 7 September, the 5th Army was threatened with being split in two by the Second Army coming from the east and the Sixth Army's northern outflanking of Kiev. The Stavka refused permission initially for the 5th Army to withdraw, as they were still hoping for results from a counterattack by the Bryansk Front. By 9 September, Stalin had finally given authority for the 5th Army to withdraw but by then it was trapped, and on 20 September Potapov and his command group were taken prisoner. In the disastrous battle, the German forces encircled forces from the 5th, 21st, 26th, 38th and 37th Armies, captured Kiev, and claimed 665,000 prisoners (Soviet sources assert that the total strength of the Southwestern Front was 677,000 of which 150,000 had escaped).

== Moscow ==
The 5th Army was re-raised for the second time in October 1941, under the command of Dmitri Lelyushenko, as part of the Soviet Western Front. Recent sources give the actual re-raising date as 11 October 1941. It included two rifle divisions and three tank brigades. At the Battle at Borodino Field, on a former Napoleonic battlefield, the first elements of the reforming Army to arrive at the front—two regiments of the Soviet 32nd Rifle Division and the 18th and 19th Tank Brigades—attempted to halt the German 10th Panzer Division and Das Reich divisions which were striking for Mozhaisk. Lelyuschenko was wounded and General L.A. Govorov took over. What thin reserves there were, ran out, and Mozhaisk fell on 18 October. Later that year the Army took part in the Klin-Solnechogorsk offensive operation.

On 15 November, another German strike toward Moscow opened, but while the flanks saw heavy fighting, up until 28 November, the 5th Army along with the two other Armies forming Western Front's centre, 33rd and 43rd, were holding quite firmly, despite some attacks on the right-most sector of their line. On 1 December, a last effort by the German XX Army Corps to reach Moscow saw a furious attack directed near the junction of the 5th Army and 33rd Army, which led to the Moscow-Minsk highway, the most direct route to the Soviet capital. Despite breaking through 33rd Army defences around Naro-Fominsk, after all available reserves were directed by Zhukov toward the breach, by 4 December, the situation had been restored and the Soviet command could resume its planning to take the offensive.

As part of the Soviet winter counteroffensive from Moscow, the 5th Army was instructed to commence its offensive actions from 11 December, pushing for Ruza-Kolyubakovo, while right flank units joined the 16th Army in hitting Istra. Eventually the 5th Army defeated the Germans near Zvenigorod, and the 2nd Guards Cavalry Corps forced itself into the German rear in a daring raid, making further advances possible. In Western Front directives of 6 and 8 January 1942, the 5th Army received orders to first outflank, and then to retake, Mozhaisk by 16 January. The 5th Army, now boasting seven rifle divisions, 82nd Motorised Rifle Division, three independent rifle brigades and 20th Tank Brigade, was on the move by mid January, and on 20 January took the town. However Govorov's rifle divisions were falling to below 2,500 each, and the Army 'started to run out of steam.'

On 20 March a Stavka directive gave new instructions to the Western and Kalinin Fronts, and among these, the 5th Army was ordered, when the offensive kicked off, to take Gzhatsk by 1 April, after which it was to capture Vyazma in conjunction with the 43rd, 49th, and 50th Armies. In April 1942 Govorov was posted to command the Leningrad Front, and apparently General Ivan Fedyuninsky took over. Some time after that, Y.T. Cherevichenko took command.

== On the Offensive ==
As part of the Western Front the 5th Army then took part in the Operation of Rzhev-Vyazma, including the Second Rzhev-Sychevka Offensive in November–December 1942. It then fought with the 10th Guards & 33rd Armies in the Second Battle of Smolensk, by which time the Army was being commanded by General V.S. Polenov. At a later point, General P.G. Shafranov held command for a period. For Operation Bagration of 1944 in Belorussia, 5th Army was part of 3rd Belorussian Front. The 5th Army, now under General N.I. Krylov, was allocated to the Front's 'Northern Group' alongside 39th Army and a Cavalry mechanized group made up of 3rd Cavalry and 3rd Guards Mechanised Corps.

The Army's path took it through Vilnius, which was cleared on 13 July with the assistance of the Polish underground after a final savage battle in the city centre. On 1 August 1944 the Army consisted of the 45th Rifle Corps (159th, 184th, 338th Rifle Divisions), the 65th Rifle Corps (97th, 144th, 371st RDs), the 72nd Rifle Corps (63rd, 215th, 277th RDs) and a wide array of supporting artillery, armour, and other units. The Army's final action in Europe was the East Prussian Offensive of 1945. Units of 184th Rifle Division, assigned as part of the 5th Army, were the first Soviet soldiers to reach the prewar frontier on 17 August 1944.

With the other armies of 3rd Belorussian Front, 5th Army then took part in the failed Gumbinnen Operation of October 1944, in which the Soviets were not able to break the German East Prussian defences. In the course of the second East Prussian offensive, in interaction with other armies of the front, the 5th Army destroyed the Tilsit-Insterburg and Khalchberg enemy groups and on 23 January occupied Insterburg. In the closing stage of its European service it participated in the liquidation of the Wehrmacht troops trapped on the Samland peninsula, the XXVIII Corps.

On 20 April 1945, the 5th Army was transferred from Stavka VGK reserve to the Maritime Group of Forces, one of the formations which was being sent to the Far East to reinforce Soviet forces there in preparation for the beginning of hostilities against Japan. The MGF was re-designated the 1st Far East Front on 5 August 1945. When the Soviet invasion of Manchuria commenced, the Army consisted of the 17th Rifle Corps (187th and 366th Rifle Divisions), 45th Rifle Corps (157th, 159th, and 184th Rifle Divisions), 65th Rifle Corps (97th, 144th, 190th, 371st Rifle Divisions), 72nd Rifle Corps (63rd, 215th, 277th Rifle Divisions), the 72nd, 76th, 208th, 210th, and 218th Tank Brigades, the 105th Fortified Area, over 35 artillery brigades and regiments, and other units. During the Harbin-Girin operation, the Army's troops, part of the 1st Far East Front's main attack, broke through the Volynskiy area where the Japanese troops were resisting and advanced to the eastern spurs of the Taypinliy ridge.

== Commanders ==
- Major General Mikhail Ivanovich Potapov (June – September 1941),
- Major General Dmitry Lelyushenko (11 – 17 October 1941),
- Major General of Artillery Leonid Govorov (18 October 1941 – 25 April 1942), from 11.1941 Lieutenant General of Artillery
- Major General Ivan Fedyuninsky (25 April – 15 October 1942), from June 1942, Lieutenant General
- Colonel General Yakov Cherevichenko (15 October 1942 – 27 February 1943),
- Lieutenant General Vitaly Polenov (27 February 1943 – 25 October 1943),
- Lieutenant General Nikolay Krylov (25 October 1943 – 16 October 1944), from July 1944, Colonel-General
- Lieutenant General Pyotr Shafranov (16 October – 16 December 1944),
- Colonel General Nikolay Krylov (16 December 1944 – December 1945).

== Postwar ==
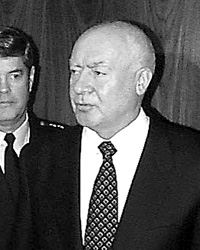
General Igor Rodionov, seen here while serving as Minister of Defence, commanded 5th Army from 1983 to 1985.

After the victory over Japan, the 5th Army remained in the Far East, and was the most powerful army in the Far East Military District throughout the entire postwar period. After the disbandment of the 9th Mechanised Army and the 25th Army in 1957, 5th Army's composition was supplemented by a whole series of divisions, including the divisions that became, after many redesignations, 277th Motor Rifle Division and 123rd Guards MRD. The 4th Missile Brigade joined the army in 1963. In 1968 the 29th Motor Rifle Division arrived from Shikhany (Saratov Oblast) at Kamen-Rybolov, Primorskiy Kray.

In the 1970s and 1980s, the 81st Guards MRD and the 199th MRDs became part of the 5th Army. The 4th, 5th, 13th 15th, and 20th Fortified Regions were also part of the army for decades (see Fortified district). In 1976 the 119th Motor Rifle Division (mobilisation) was formed at Lyalichi, Primorskiy Kray, which became the 77th Tank Division (mobilisation) in January 1982. General Igor Rodionov, later the Russian Minister of Defence, commanded the Army from 1983 to 1985.

In 1987 the 77th Tank Division became the 1008th Territorial Training Centre, then a VKhVT in 1989, then was disbanded in 1993.

On 29 November 2000 the then Far East Military District commander, General Colonel Yuri Yakubov, was reported in Vremya Novostei as saying that only 'four fully staffed operational regiments and several operational divisions' in the district were combat ready. In addition, the last exercise for reserve divisions was run in 1985. One regiment at Yekaterinoslavka, Khabarovsk Krai was reported in October 1999 as being the only 100% manned regiment in 35th Army, so it could be guessed that during the 1999–2000 time period the remaining three full-strength regiments were with the 5th Army.

In 2007 Russian reports described the army as consisting of Headquarters [at Ussuriysk]; the 81st Guards (Bikin) and 121st Motor Rifle Division (Sibirtsevo), the 127th (Segreevka) and 129th (Barabash) MGADs, the 130th Machine-Gun Artillery Division (Lesozavodsk), 20th Guards Rocket Brigade (Spassk-Dalny) (OTR-21 Tochka SSM), 719th Multiple Rocket Launcher Regiment (Pokrovka), 958th Anti-Tank Artillery Regiment, and other smaller combat and support formations.

=== Role in the 2022 Invasion of Ukraine ===
In the context of the 2022 Russian invasion of Ukraine, elements of the 5th Army (including units from the 57th Motor Rifle Brigade and two additional Motor Rifle Regiments) had been deployed to Belarus and were participating in active operations.

=== Commanders ===
- Nikanor Zakhvatayev (December 1945 – 18 February 1947)
- Ivan Chistyakov (19 February 1947 – 19 April 1948)
- Pyotr Koshevoy (20 April 1948 – 8 June 1954)
- Mikhail Potapov (August 1954 – 15 April 1958)
- Aleksandr Yegorovsky (16 April 1958 – 23 September 1960)
- Yakov Repin (24 September 1960 – 3 March 1964)
- Vasily Petrov (June 1964 – 21 January 1966)
- Kamil Ganeyev (22 January 1966 – 18 August 1969)
- Pyotr Sysoyev (19 August 1969 – April 1971)
- Vladimir Konchits (April 1971 – 6 March 1974)
- Anatoly Ryakhov (7 March 1974 – 3 January 1979)
- Anatoly Smirnov (4 January 1979 – June 1983)
- Igor Rodionov (June 1983 – 18 August 1985)
- Anatoly Kostenko (19 April 1985 – October 1987)
- Aleksandr Yudin (October 1987 – December 1989)
- Nikolai Zvinchukov (December 1989 – July 1990)
- Vladimir Potapov (July 1990 – February 1993)
- Nikolai Kormiltsev (May 1993 – November 1994)
- Aleksandr Morozov (November 1994 – November 1997)
- Aleksandr Belousov (November 1997 – August 1999)
- Aleksandr Novikov (August 1999 – September 2001)
- Aleksandr Stolyarov (September 2001 – June 2003)
- Nikolai Dymov (June 2003 – June 2006)
- Anatoly Sidorov (July 2006 – June 2008)
- Aleksandr Dvornikov (June 2008 – January 2011)
- Andrey Serdyukov (January 2011 – February 2013)
- Aleksey Salmin (October 2013 – September 2016)
- Valery Asapov (October 2016 – September 2017)
- Roman Kutuzov (October 2017 – August 2018)
- Oleg Tsekov (August 2018 – September 2020)
- Aleksey Podivilov (18 September 2020 – 2022)
- Pyotr Bolgarev (2023 – 2024)
- Ivan Yeruslanov (2024 – )

== Structure ==
Eastern Military District
  - 5th Combined Arms Army
    - 80th Command Brigade (Ussuriysk)
    - 127th Motor Rifle Division (Sergeyevka)
      - 114th Motor Rifle Regiment
      - 143rd Motor Rifle Regiment
      - 392nd Motor Rifle Regiment
      - 394th Motor Rifle Regiment
      - 433rd Motor Rifle Regiment
      - 1466th Motor Rifle Regiment
      - 218th Tank Regiment
      - 872nd Self-Propelled Artillery Regiment (Lieutenant Colonel Fyodor Evgenievich Solovyov)
    - 57th Motor Rifle Brigade (Bikin)
    - 60th Motor Rifle Brigade (Monastyrishche)
    - 305th Artillery Brigade (Ussuriysk)
    - 8th Anti-Aircraft Brigade (Ussuriysk)
    - 101st Logistic Support Brigade (Ussuriysk)
    - 25th NBC Protection Regiment (Sergeyevka) (MUN 58079);
    - 79th Signal Center (Ussuriysk)
    - 237th Weapon Storage and Repair Base (Bikin)
    - 245th Weapon Storage and Repair Base (Lesozavodsk)
    - 247th Weapon Storage and Repair Base (Monastyrishche)
