= 25th Army (Soviet Union) =

WW2 Soviet Red Army formation

- 25-я армия
- Active: June 1941 – December 1957
- Country: Soviet Union
- Branch: Red Army
- Type: Combined arms
- Size: Field Army three to six divisions
- Engagements: Soviet–Japanese War; Liberation of Korea; Invasion of Manchuria

Commanders
- Notable commanders: Ivan Chistyakov

The 25th Army (Russian: 25-я армия) was a Red Army field army of World War II that served in the Russian Far East, as part of Chongjin Landing Operation.

Formed in June 1941, the 25th Army did not see combat until the Soviet invasion of Manchuria in August 1945, when it advanced into northern Korea. After World War II it was responsible for the Soviet Civil Administration in the northern Korean Peninsula, and helped establish a Communist state in North Korea under the rule of Kim Il Sung. The army remained in North Korea until it was withdrawn in 1948, and was stationed in Primorsky Krai until its 1957 disbandment.

== World War II ==
It was formed in the Soviet Far East Front on the basis of the headquarters of the 43rd Rifle Corps (in Primorsky Krai) on 20 June 1941 in accordance with an order of 8 March. Headquartered at Voroshilov (now Ussuriysk), it was commanded by Lieutenant General Filipp Parusinov. The army initially comprised 39th Rifle Corps with 32nd Rifle Division, 40th, and 92nd Rifle Divisions, as well as the 105th Rifle Division and the 106th, 107th, 108th, 110th, and 111th Fortified Areas as Army troops. The army was responsible for defending the border in Primorsky Krai. On 10 August 1943, the army became part of the Maritime Group of Forces, which on 20 April 1945 became part of the Far Eastern Front, and was soon directly subordinated to the Stavka.

In June, Colonel General Ivan Chistyakov took command of the army. On 5 August, the army became part of the 1st Far East Front, which was redesignated from the Maritime Group of Forces in preparation for the Soviet invasion of Manchuria. At the time, the 393rd Rifle Division and the 7th and 113th Fortified Areas were in the army's direct subordination. By the beginning of the invasion on 9 August, the army included the 39th Rifle Corps with the 40th, the 384th, and the 386th Rifle Divisions, the 393rd Rifle Division, and the 7th, 106th, 107th, 108th, 110th, 111th, and the 113th Fortified Areas. It also appears that 218th Tank Brigade was part of the army.

During the Soviet invasion of Manchuria, the army fought in the Harbin–Kirin Offensive Operation. By the end of 10 August the army overcame Japanese resistance to capture the Dongning, Dongxin-zhen, and the Hunchun fortified areas, cut the Dongning-Tumyntsa-Hunchun road, advanced through Japanese defenses to a depth of 15 kilometres (9.3 miles) to 20 kilometres (12 miles). On 11 August, the 25th Army captured Laoheishan and Hunchun, and on the next day captured the ports of Unggi and Rason on the east coast of Korea alongside landing forces of the Pacific Fleet. As a result of its advances, the army received the 5th Army's 17th Rifle Corps and the 88th Rifle Division and 10th Mechanized Corps from front reserve. With the reinforcements, the army also received a new task: to advance south and cut the communications between Japanese troops in Korea and those in Manchuria, and in cooperation with the Pacific Fleet landing forces, to capture ports on the east coast of Korea. In fulfilling this task, the army defeated parts of the Japanese 3rd and 34th Armies and captured Wangqing on 15 August, Chongjin on 16 August, Ranan and Yanji on 17 August, among others. Between 18 and 20 August, the army disarmed surrendered Japanese troops, and was redeployed to the Pyongyang area at the end of the month.

== Post-war ==
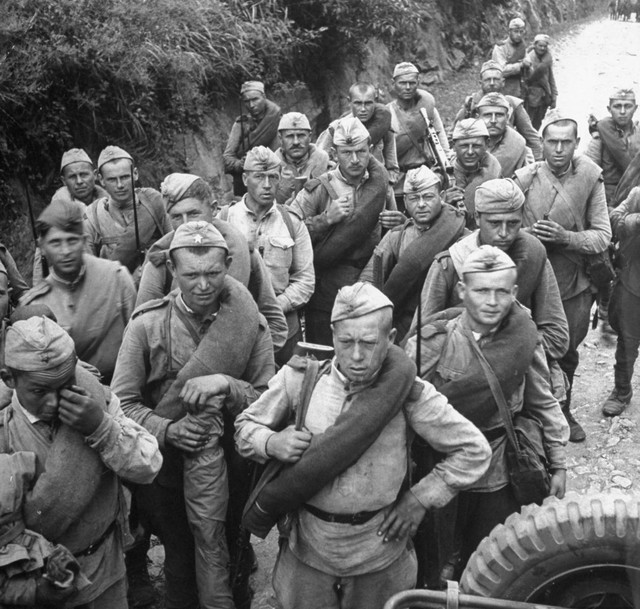
Troops of the army in Korea, October 1945

The army's headquarters was established at Pyongyang on 26 August after Chistyakov rejected the option of Hamhung on the previous day after the 25th Army was given the task of occupying what would become North Korea. The location of the 25th Army's headquarters in Pyongyang probably determined the location of the future North Korean capital. Immediately after the end of the war with Japan it included 39th Rifle Corps (40th, 384th Rifle Divisions and 10th Mechanised Division) and 88th Rifle Corps (258th, 386th and 393rd Rifle Divisions) and 8 fortified regions (including the 7th, 106th, 108th, 110th, 111th, 113th, 150th, 162nd) but they were all reorganised in 1946 into machine-gun artillery divisions. There were also the 72nd, 76th, 218th, 259th Tank Brigades. On 1 October, the army became part of the Primorsky Military District. The two corps were disbanded in August 1946 and 65th Rifle Corps (63rd and 144th Rifle Divisions) was transferred to the 25th Army from the 5th Army.

The division of Korea between the United States and the Soviet Union as the two dominant superpowers after the defeat of Japan had been agreed to at the Tehran Conference in 1943. The 25th Army served as the occupation force in north of the 38th parallel while the U.S. Army Military Government in Korea was established in the south. Under the Soviet Civil Administration the 25th Army helped place Kim Il Sung and the Korean Workers' Party into power. They also assisted with the purges of former collaborators, businessmen, landowners, and religious leaders. These people would either flee to the future South Korea or would be banished or imprisoned in the Hamgyong Province.

In late 1948, the army was withdrawn from North Korea and stationed in southern Primorsky Krai on the Korean and Chinese borders, as well as on the Peter the Great Gulf coast. Its headquarters was located in Shkotovo. In March 1953 the army also included the 9th, 10th, 21st, and 24th Machine-Gun Artillery Divisions. The 10th Mechanized Division had become part of the 65th Rifle Corps by this time, and the 40th Rifle Division was directly subordinated to the army. In April 1953, the Primorsky Military District was disbanded, and the army became part of the Far Eastern Military District. The army's last commander was Lieutenant General (promoted to Colonel General 8 August 1955) Ivan Rubanyuk, who assumed command on 18 May 1953. The 65th Rifle Corps and its divisions were disbanded in the summer of 1956 and the remaining 25th Army rifle divisions became motor rifle divisions in the spring of 1957. On 1 May, the army included the 40th, 84th, 147th, and the 148th Motor Rifle Divisions. In December 1957, the army was disbanded and its remaining divisions transferred to the 5th Army. The 84th, 147th, and 148th Divisions were disbanded along with the 25th Army.

== Commanders ==
During its existence, the 25th Army was commanded by the following officers:

- Lieutenant General Filipp Parusinov (11 March 1941 – 25 June 1943)
- Major General Alexander Maximov (25 June 1943 – 28 June 1945)
- Colonel General Ivan Chistyakov (28 June 1945 – 18 February 1947)
- Lieutenant General Gennady Korotkov (19 February 1947 – 19 April 1948)
- Lieutenant General Vasily Shvetsov (20 April 1948 – 17 May 1953)
- Lieutenant General (promoted to Colonel General 8 August 1955) Ivan Rubanyuk (18 May 1953 – 30 December 1957)
