= Special Red Banner Far Eastern Army =

Military formation of the Red Army

The Special Far Eastern Army, later the Special Red Banner Far Eastern Army (Russian: Осо́бая Краснознамённая Дальневосто́чная а́рмия (ОКДВА), romanized: Osóbaya Krasnoznamonnaya Dal'nevostóchnaya ármiya (OKDVA)) was a military formation of the Red Army, active from 1929 to 1938 and under command of Vasily Blyukher.

It was activated on 6 August 1929, originally with the 18th and 19th Rifle Corps assigned, in response to the Sino-Soviet border conflict regarding the ownership of the Chinese Eastern Railway.

Following the Soviet victory in the Civil War the Soviet forces in the Far East became the Special Far Eastern Army of the Far Eastern Republic. Circa 1932 the 3rd Kholkoz Rifle Division OKDVA was established, and the 57th Rifle Division joined the army.

The District was first briefly formed in 1935 from those forces, but then reverted to the title Special Red Banner Far Eastern Army (OKDVA), under Marshal of the Soviet Union Vasily Blyukher, while still functioning as a military district. The Army became the Soviet Far East Front in June 1938, after Blyukher's torture and death at the hands of the NKVD during the Great Purge. It was reportedly disestablished on 30 June 1938.
