= Kirill Meretskov =

Soviet military commander (1897–1968)

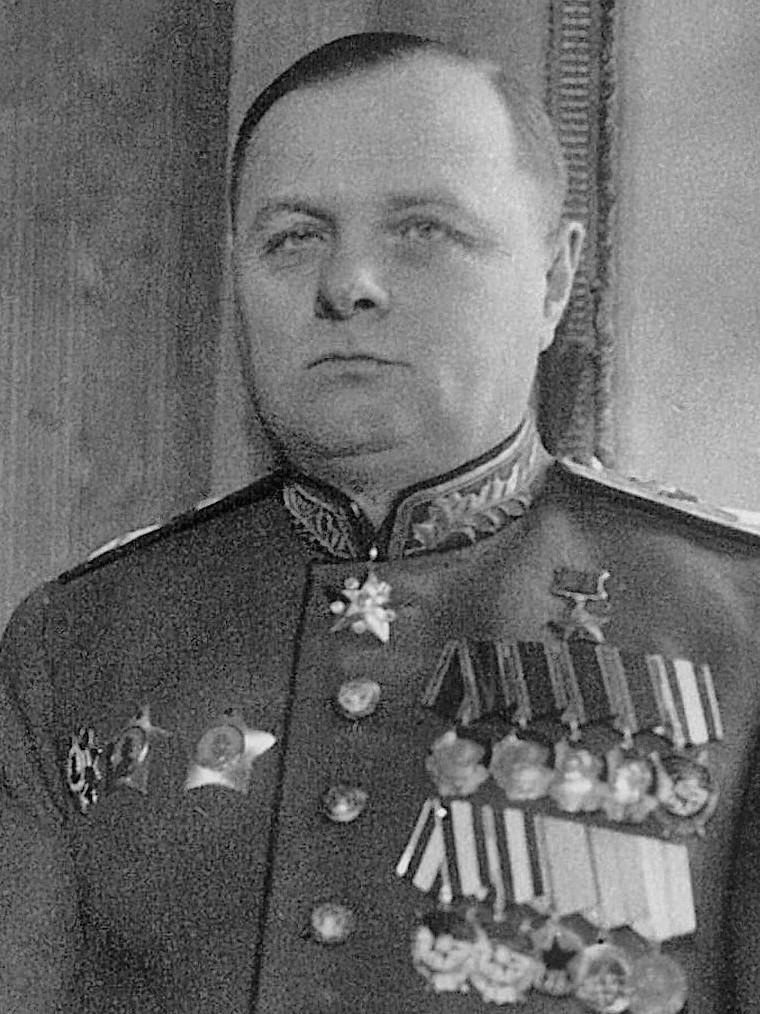
- Meretskov in 1945
- Born: 7 June [O.S. 26 May] 1897; Nazaryevo, Ryazan Governorate, Russian Empire
- Died: 30 December 1968 (aged 71); Moscow, Russian SFSR, Soviet Union
- Burial place: Kremlin Wall Necropolis
- Military career
- Allegiance: Russian SFSR (1917–1922); Soviet Union (1922–1964)
- Service years: 1917–1964
- Rank: Marshal of the Soviet Union (1944–1964)
- Commands: Volga Military District; Leningrad Military District; 7th Army; Chief of the General Staff; Volkhov Front; Karelian Front; Soviet Far East Front; Moscow Military District
- Conflicts: Russian Civil War; Spanish Civil War; World War II; Winter War; Great Patriotic War; Siege of Leningrad; Svir–Petrozavodsk Offensive; Petsamo–Kirkenes Offensive; Soviet–Japanese War; Harbin–Kirin Operation
- Awards: Hero of the Soviet Union; Order of Victory
- Other work: Chief of the General Staff; Deputy Commissar of Defense; Assistant Minister of Defense; Inspector-General of the Army

Kirill Afanasievich Meretskov (Russian: Кири́лл Афана́сьевич Мерецко́в; 7 June [O.S. 26 May] 1897 – 30 December 1968) was a Soviet military commander. Having joined the Communist Party in 1917, he served in the Red Army from 1920. During the Winter War of 1939–1940 against Finland, he had the task of penetrating the Mannerheim Line as commander of the 7th Army. He was awarded the title of Hero of the Soviet Union shortly afterwards.

The NKVD arrested Meretskov at the start of the invasion of the Soviet Union. Released two months later, he returned to command the 7th Army and later the Volkhov Front during the 1941–1944 siege of Leningrad. He commanded the Karelian Front from February 1944, notably the Petsamo–Kirkenes Offensive of October 1944. From April 1945 he was assigned to the Far East, where he commanded a front during the Soviet invasion of Japanese Manchuria. During the war he reached the rank of Marshal of the Soviet Union.

== Early life and career ==
Meretskov was born at Nazaryevo in Ryazan Governorate (now in Moscow Oblast), southeast of Moscow. His parents were peasants of Russian ethnicity and lived in a rural village. He was a factory worker from 1909, first in Moscow, later near Vladimir. An active member of the underground revolutionary movement since 1915, Meretskov joined the Bolsheviks (later the Communist Party of the Soviet Union) in August 1917, and became chief of staff of the Red Guard militia that helped to organise in the town. During the Russian Civil War, he was chief of staff of a regiment, and later a division. In 1921, he graduated from the Military Academy (later the M. V. Frunze Military Academy).

From 1922, he held a number of commands as chief of staff, first in a cavalry division, later in various armies and military districts. From September 1936 to May 1937, Meretskov fought for the Republicans during the Spanish Civil War under a pseudonym "General Pavlovich". In 1939, he was appointed commander of the Leningrad Military District.

== World War II ==
=== Finland campaign ===
In November 1939, at the start of the Winter War, Meretskov initially ran the overall operation against the Finns. However, gross underestimations of the Finnish defenses, the size of their forces and the corresponding overestimations of the capacity of the Red Army, led to serious planning flaws. Only five rifle divisions were initially sent to assault the Mannerheim Line and piecemeal commitment of reinforcements did not achieve any effect. Meretskov failed and the command was passed on 9 December 1939 to the General Staff Supreme Command, Stavka, directly under Kliment Voroshilov (chairman), Nikolai Kuznetsov, Joseph Stalin and Boris Shaposhnikov.

Meretskov was appointed to command of the 7th Army. In January 1940, the Leningrad Military District was reformed and renamed "North-Western Front." Semyon Timoshenko was chosen Army Commander to break the Mannerheim Line. This Soviet offensive was checked by the Finnish Army in the Battle of Taipale. For the next offensive, the Stavka significantly reinforced the 7th Army, deployed the 13th Army on its flank and assigned substantial heavy artillery to both armies, including B-4 howitzers and Br-5 mortars.

The next Soviet offensive began in February 1940. The heavy artillery support allowed the Soviet forces to breach the Mannerheim Line. Meretskov's 7th Army proceeded to fight in Viborg, which so far had resisted attempts of Soviet conquest. Less than two weeks after the signing of the Moscow Peace Treaty, on March 21, 1940, Meretskov was awarded the title of Hero of the Soviet Union. Afterwards, Meretskov was promoted to the rank of army general and made Deputy Commissar of Defense. From August 1940 to January 1941, he was Chief of the General Staff. He was dismissed on 14 January 1941, and on 24 January, Stalin spotted him at the Bolshoi and, in front of witnesses: "You are courageous, capable, but without principles, spineless. You want to be nice, but you should have a plan instead and adhere to it strictly, despite the fact that someone or other is going to be resentful."

=== Operation Barbarossa ===
On June 22, 1941, when Operation Barbarossa started, Meretskov was appointed permanent adviser to Stavka. However, on June 23 he was arrested by the NKVD as a member of an alleged anti-Soviet military conspiracy. The exact reasons are unknown, and the case file was destroyed in 1955. Meretskov's close friendship with General Dmitry Pavlov, the Soviet Commander of the Western Front who had been executed, is often considered a factor, although Pavlov, at the time, was yet to even be relieved of duty, much less arrested. Mark Solonin, in his book June the 25th: Stupidity or Aggression, proposes a theory that the actual reason might have been Meretskov's skepticism about the need to start bombardments of Finland, and his later release was due to him turning out to have been right, although he admits that direct evidence is unlikely to be found. After being subjected to two months of torture, including being beaten with rubber rods, and having one of his ribs broken by the notorious torturer Boris Rodos in Lubyanka Prison, Meretskov relented and signed a written confession. According to Nikita Khrushchev, "before his arrest, Meretskov had been a strapping young general, very strong and impressive-looking. After his release, he was a shadow of his former self. He had lost so much weight he could hardly speak." Released in September, he was taken before the police chief, Vsevolod Merkulov, whom he had known socially: he told Merkulov that their friendship was over. He was then presented to Stalin, in full army dress, and given command of the 7th Separate Army. His confession was used against other commanders arrested in May–July 1941, who were executed on the order of Lavrenty Beria near Kuybyshev on October 28, 1941, or sentenced by the Special Council of the NKVD and executed on February 23, 1942.

=== Victory at Tikhvin ===
Meretskov was appointed Commander of the 4th Army, which fought in the defense of Leningrad against the Army Group North of von Leeb. After stopping the German Tikhvin offensive, his forces, together with the neighboring 52nd and 54th Armies, counterattacked and pushed the German forces back to their starting positions, recapturing Tikhvin on December 10, 1941. This victory was the first Soviet large-scale success during the war. The battle also assisted the Battle of Moscow, as significant German forces were tied down in heavy attrition fighting in the marshes and forests between Tikhvin and Tosno and were not able to assist during the Soviet counteroffensive. Notably, the battle locked down two German panzer divisions and two motorized divisions and inflicted serious casualties to the army group overall.

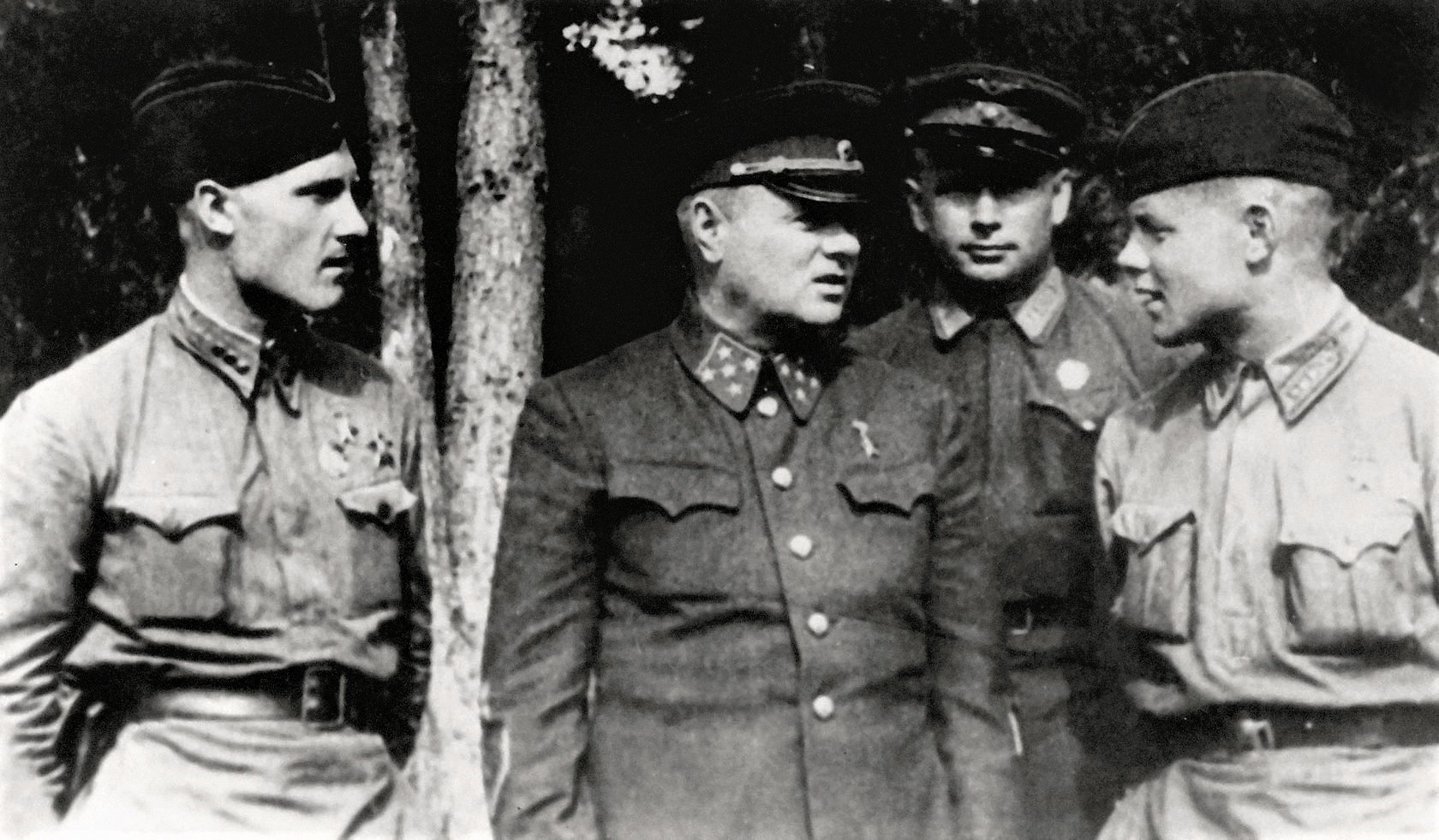
Meretskov, after landing at the Khvoynaya airfield, 1942

During the counteroffensive of the battle, Stavka ordered Kirill Meretskov to organize a new Volkhov Front, which he commanded until February 1944 (with the exception of May and June 1942).

=== Defeat at Lyuban ===
In January 1942, Meretskov started a new offensive near Lyuban, aimed at lifting the siege of Leningrad and encircling a large number of German forces. The advance was very slow, however, as the German forces were well dug in, reinforced and no longer overextended. By March the two Soviet armies trying to close the encirclement were less than 25 kilometres (16 mi) apart, but could advance no more. On March 15, German forces began a counteroffensive and cut off the Soviet 2nd Shock Army. Soviet forces managed to restore communications by March 30 after heavy fighting. However, when Meretskov reported this to the Stavka, he omitted that the corridor that was linking the 2nd Shock Army to the rest of the Soviet forces was no more than 2 kilometres (1.2 mi) wide, under constant German air strikes and artillery bombardment, and therefore, had a very poor transport capacity. As a result, the Stavka did not extract the 2nd Shock Army, when it was still possible. During late April and all of May, the Volkhov Front was temporarily subordinated to lieutenant general Khosin's Leningrad Front, and Meretskov was sent as deputy high commander to the Western Front.

By May 1942, the 2nd Shock Army was experiencing supply shortages and low morale. On May 30, the German forces began a second offensive and again cut it off. After part of the encircled force broke out on June 5, the rest of the army was systematically destroyed, with 33,000 men becoming prisoners, about the same number killed, and about 10,000 men who broke out.

Immediately after the battle, Meretskov placed the blame on the captured 2nd Shock Army commander, Andrey Vlasov, whom he himself recommended to the post in April, a claim that was echoed in his post-war memoirs. Since Vlasov went on to collaborate with the German forces, there were few attempts to revisit this claim during the Soviet era. However, David Glantz points out that, irrespective of Vlasov's decision to collaborate with German forces, his level of command in May and June 1942 was not different from most other army commanders. Furthermore, Meretskov does bear some responsibility for the defeat as the commander of the front who planned the operation and carried it out. Khosin, the commander of the Leningrad Front, was removed from command on June 8, reduced in rank and never commanded a front again, humiliatingly assigned from March 1944 to the rear line Volga Military District. Meretskov, who was arrested less than a year earlier, knew that his life may be at risk if he accepted responsibility for the disaster.

=== Breaking the siege of Leningrad ===
After the defeat at Lyuban, Meretskov remained in command of the Volkhov Front. Together with the new Leningrad Front's commander, Leonid Govorov, Meretskov planned a new offensive to break the siege of the city. Volkhov and Leningrad fronts would break the blockade of the city by eliminating the German positions south of Lake Ladoga, where only 16 kilometres (9.9 mi) separated the Leningrad and Volkhov Fronts. This position was called "the bottleneck". At the same time, German forces were planning Operation Northern Light (German: Nordlicht) to capture the city and link up with Finnish forces. To achieve that, heavy reinforcements arrived from Sevastopol, which the German forces had captured in July 1942. Both sides were unaware of the other's preparations. As a result, the Soviet Sinyavino Offensive failed and the 2nd Shock army was decimated for the second time in a year, but the German forces suffered heavy casualties and canceled Operation Northern Light. Meretskov wanted to conduct further local attacks, but this request was categorically denied by the Stavka, in addition to a formal critique he received on October 15, 1942, for his conduct of the operation.

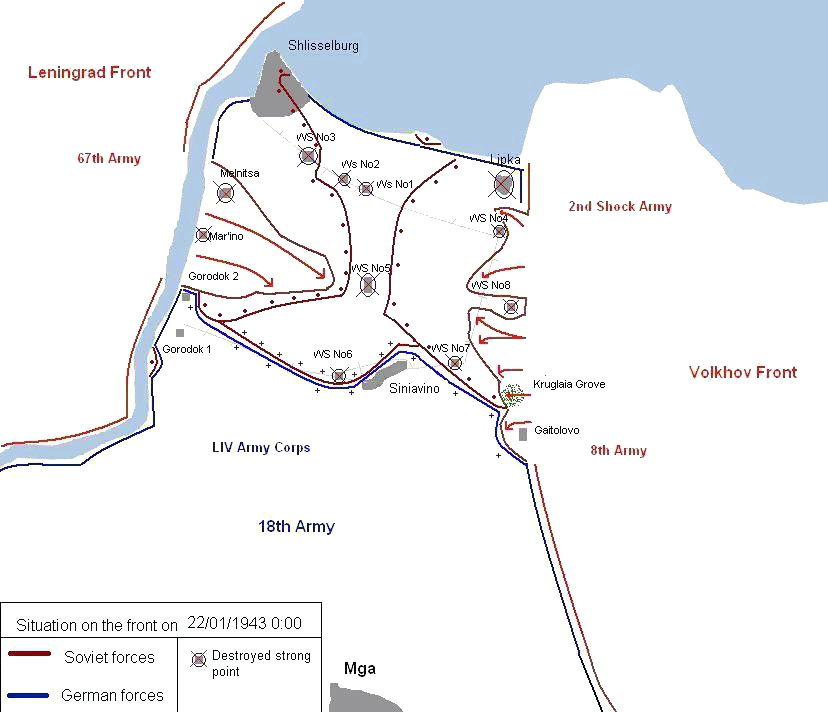
Operation Iskra, January 1943

In late November 1942, Govorov commenced planning the next operation to break the blockade of Leningrad. Meretskov soon joined the planning. In December, the plan was approved by the Stavka and received the codename Operation Iskra (Spark). Operation Iskra began on January 13, 1943, and on January 18, Soviet forces linked up, breaking the blockade. By January 22, the front line stabilized. The operation successfully opened a land corridor 8–10 km wide to the city. A railroad was swiftly built through the corridor that allowed far more supplies to reach the city than the "Road of Life", eliminating the possibility of the capture of the city and a German-Finnish link up. On January 28, both Meretskov and Govorov were awarded the Order of Suvorov 1st Class.

Leningrad and Volkhov Fronts tried to follow up their success with a much more ambitious offensive operation named Operation Polyarnaya Zvezda (Polar Star). This operation had the aim of decisively defeating Army Group North, but achieved very modest gains. Several other offensives were conducted by Meretskov in the area in 1943, slowly expanding the corridor, and making other small gains. In November 1943, Meretskov and Govorov began planning the Leningrad-Novgorod Offensive which would drive Army Group North out of the Leningrad region.

On January 14, 1944, the Soviet offensive started. By March 1, the Leningrad, Volkhov and 2nd Baltic Fronts had driven Army Group North back up to 300 kilometres (190 mi) on a 400 kilometres (250 mi) front, liberating the southern Leningrad region and part of the Kalinin region. Meretskov and Govorov were once again awarded the Order of Suvorov 1st Class together.

=== Karelian Front and Manchuria ===
In February 1944, Meretskov was transferred to the Karelian Front. Here, he participated in the Vyborg–Petrozavodsk Offensive that started in June 1944. His front liberated the city of Petrozavodsk and East Karelia. In October, Meretskov was ordered to clear the city of Petsamo, in northern Finland, of Germans and to drive the German army back into Norway. Meretskov was able to use his knowledge of Arctic warfare to launch a co-ordinated offensive called the Petsamo–Kirkenes Offensive that drove the Germans back from their positions. After this offensive Meretskov was promoted to the rank of Marshal of the Soviet Union, on October 26, 1944.

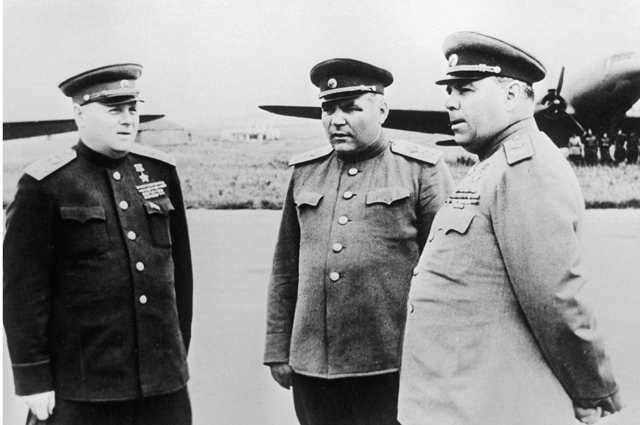
Meretskov (left) with Marshals Rodion Malinovsky (center) and Aleksandr Vasilevsky, at an airfield in Dalian, China

Meretskov's next major command was in Manchuria in 1945, in the Far East, where he was selected to lead the 1st Far East Front during the Soviet invasion of Manchuria, under the overall command of Aleksandr Vasilevsky. According to the plan, the main force of the 1st Far East Front Army of set out from Primorsky Krai, broke through the Japanese defense line set up in the East Manchuria, and carried out assaults against the Kwantung Army in Jilin, in order to compete with Marshal Rodion Malinovsky's Transbaikal Front. The Transbaikal Front Army cooperated and advanced towards Changchun.

Meretskov's Far East First Front Army and Maksim Purkayev's 2nd Far East Front jointly enclosed the Kwantung Army at Harbin in an area with a circumference of 1,500 kilometers. Before the attack on August 9, there was a heavy rain. Meretskov decisively ordered the attack without artillery fire as planned. The sudden attack worked and the Soviet army successfully seized the forward position. Within a week, the 1st Far East Front Army broke through the Kwantung Army's 1st Front Army permanently prepared fortifications and penetrated 120–150 km. The Japanese headquarters completely lost command of the team and did not organize strong resistance until August 15. After August 15, the Japanese tried to organize heavy resistance in Mudanjiang, but they still could not stop the advancement of Meretskov's 1st Far East Front Army. On the 18th, the commander of the Kwantung Army Otozō Yamada did not reply to Meretskov's telegram requesting him to surrender. Meretskov ordered the airborne troops to be dropped at Harbin and other airports. The Kwantung Army surrendered on August 19.

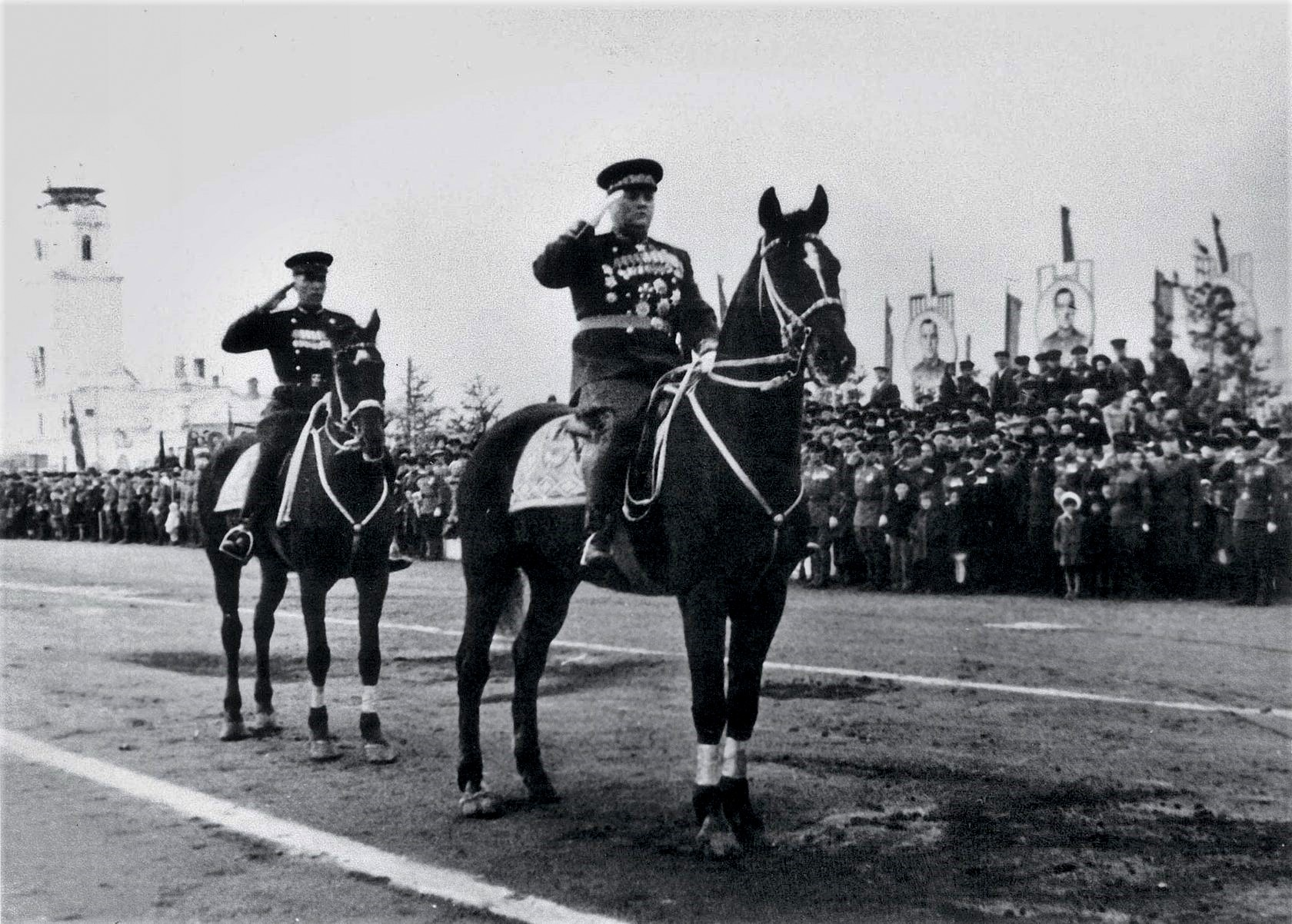
Meretskov in the military parade of the 29th anniversary of the October Revolution, 1946

In addition to military work, Meretskov also did political work. At the end of August, he went to the Chinese brigade inspection training led by Zhou Baozhong and asked his subordinates to provide the report of the North Korean battalion commander by future leader of North Korea Kim Il Sung. In September, Meretskov inspected the liberated cities of Changchun, Shenyang and Dalian, and assisted the Chinese Communist Party in restoring the party organization in the Northeast China and the establishment of the Northern Manchurian Committee of CCP. Meretskov was awarded the Order of Victory. As commander of Soviet forces in Korea, he launched the career of Kim Il Sung.

== Commander and Assistant Minister of Defense ==
After the war Meretskov commanded a number of military districts until 1955 (including the Moscow Military District in 1947–49), when he was made Assistant Minister of Defense, a post he held until 1964. In that year, he was made the Inspector-General of the Ministry Defense, a largely ceremonial post.

=== Death ===
Meretskov died on December 30, 1968, at the age of 71. The urn containing his ashes is buried in the Kremlin Wall Necropolis. Streets in Moscow, St. Petersburg and Petrozavodsk are named after him.

== Honours and awards ==
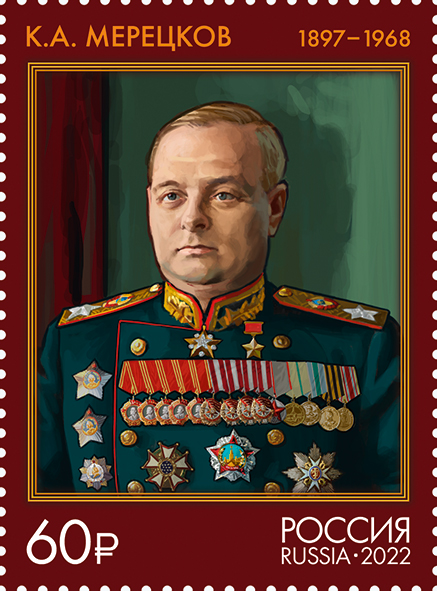
Meretskov on a 2022 stamp of Russia

Soviet Union

Hero of the Soviet Union (No. 242–21 March 1940)
Order of Victory (No. 18–8 September 1945)
Seven Orders of Lenin (3 January 1937, 21 March 1940, 2 November 1944, 21 February 1945, 6 June 1947, 6 June 1957, 6 June 1967)
Order of the October Revolution (22 February 1968)
Order of Red Banner, four times (22 February 1928, 2 March 1938, 3 November 1944, 6 November 1947)
Order of Kutuzov, 1st class (29 June 1944)
Order of Suvorov, 1st class (27 August 1943)
Medal "For the Defence of Leningrad" (22 December 1942)
Medal "For the Defence of the Soviet Transarctic" (5 December 1944)
Medal "For the Victory over Germany in the Great Patriotic War 1941–1945" (9 May 1945)
Medal "For the Victory over Japan" (30 September 1945)
Jubilee Medal "Twenty Years of Victory in the Great Patriotic War 1941-1945" (7 May 1965)
Jubilee Medal "XX Years of the Workers' and Peasants' Red Army" (22 February 1938)
Jubilee Medal "30 Years of the Soviet Army and Navy" (22 February 1948)
Jubilee Medal "40 Years of the Armed Forces of the USSR" (18 December 1957)
Jubilee Medal "50 Years of the Armed Forces of the USSR" (26 December 1967)
Medal "In Commemoration of the 800th Anniversary of Moscow" (20 September 1947)
Medal "In Commemoration of the 250th Anniversary of Leningrad" (16 May 1957)

Foreign awards

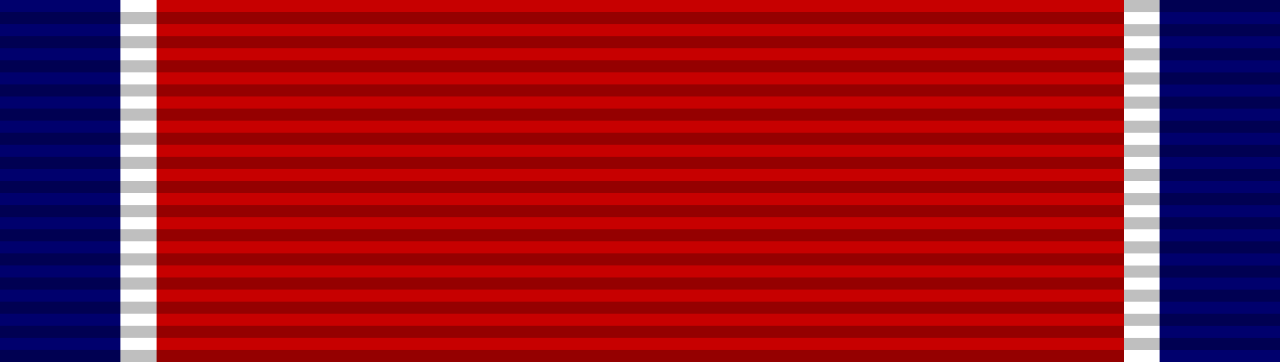
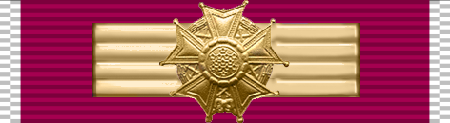
Order of the Cloud and Banner with Special Grand Cordon (Republic of China, 1945)
Medal "For Victory over Japan" (Mongolian People's Republic, 1946)
Order of the National Flag, 1st class (North Korea, 1948)
Medal for the Liberation of Korea (North Korea, 1948)
Knight Grand Cross of the Order of St. Olav (Norway, 1945)
Legion of Merit, Chief Commander (US, 1946)

== In popular culture ==
Meretskov is a character in the 2009 novel The Hundred-Year-Old Man Who Climbed Out the Window and Disappeared.

== See also ==
- Outline of the Russian Revolution and Civil War
- Bibliography of the Russian Revolution and Civil War
- Bibliography of Stalinism and the Soviet Union
- Index of Old Bolsheviks
- Index of articles related to the Russian Revolution and Civil War

== Sources ==
- Edwards, Robert (2006). White Death: Russia's War on Finland 1939–40. London: Weidenfeld & Nicolson. ISBN 978-0-297-84630-7.
- Glantz, David M. (2002). The Battle for Leningrad 1941–1944. Kansas University Press. ISBN 0-7006-1208-4.
- Trotter, William R. (2002) [1991]. The Winter war: The Russo–Finnish War of 1939–40 (5th ed.). New York (Great Britain: London): Workman Publishing Company (Great Britain: Aurum Press). ISBN 1-85410-881-6. "First published in the United States under the title A Frozen Hell: The Russo–Finnish Winter War of 1939–40"
- Исаев, Алексей Валерьевич (2006). Краткий курс истории ВОВ. Наступление маршала Шапошникова (in Russian). М. Яуза, Эксмо. ISBN 978-5-699-14384-9.
- Исаев, Алексей Валерьевич (2004). Десять мифов Второй мировой (in Russian). М. Яуза, Эксмо. ISBN 5-699-07634-4.
- "Мерецков К. А." [Meretskov K. A.]. warheroes.ru hosts data about all persons awarded the Hero of Soviet Union or Hero of Russia titles.

Military offices
Preceded by Boris Shaposhnikov	Chief of the Staff of the Red Army; August 1940 – January 1941	Succeeded by Georgy Zhukov
