= 10th Mechanized Corps =

- Active: 1941; 1945-1946
- Country: Soviet Union
- Branch: Armoured Forces
- Type: Mechanized Corps
- Engagements: Siege of Leningrad

The 10th Mechanized Corps was a formation in the Soviet Red Army during the Second World War.

== First formation ==
The corps was initially formed in March 1941 in response the German victories of 1940. It was attached to the Leningrad Military District, and was held in reserve near the Leningrad Fortified Region in Soviet Union. It was under the command of Major General I.G. Lazarev when the German Operation Barbarossa began in June 1941. It initially comprised the 21st and 24th Tank Divisions, and the 198th Mechanized Division. (Note: On 22 June 1941, the 10th Mechanized Corps consisted of 26,168 men, 469 tanks, 86 armoured cars, 75 artillery pieces, 157 mortars, 1000 vehicles, 34 tractors, and 460 motorcycles; lighter models of the T-26, BT-7, and T-28 tanks were included.)

The 10th Mechanized Corps was transported to the Finnish border near Imatra, so it was not involved in the first battles of Operation Barbarossa, being brought out of reserve on 10 July 1941. (Note: On 11 July 1941, Colonel Pavel Poluboiarov reported that on 10 July, the 21st Tank Division of the 10th Mechanized Corps was disposed in the northwestern front. The deployed forces were: one tank regiment, a motorized rifle regiment, an artillery battalion, other divisional units, and around 100 old light tanks.) From that date, it formed part of the Luga Operational Group under the command of Lieutenant General K. P. Piadyshev, defending the 'Luga Line'. The Luga Line defenses were constructed by 55,000 civilians, which were extended from Narva to Shimsk on Lake Ilmen. It first engaged the 8th Panzer Division on 13 July 1941 along with the 177th Rifle Division, isolating it from its neighbouring divisions for several days around Dno, resulting in 70 of its 150 tanks being either destroyed or damaged.

The Luga Operational Group was encircled & destroyed on 8 August 1941 near Krasnogvardeisk, which resulted in losses of 30,000 men, 120 tanks, and 400 guns. The 10th Mechanized Corps was officially disbanded a short time later although individual units continued to exist separately for a short while.

By September 1941, the 198th Mechanized Division had become the 198th Rifle Division and the 24th Tank Division had been dissolved and reformed as the 124th Tank Battalion and 12th Tank Regiment.

== Second formation ==
The second 10th Mechanized Corps was formed in December 1944. It did not fight in World War II. However, it participated in the Harbin–Kirin offensive operation during the Soviet invasion of Manchuria.

After the war, in January 1946, the corps was reorganized into the 10th Mechanized Division; it was part of the 25th Army of the Primorsky Military District. The division was stationed in Korea along with other units from the 25th Army until 1948. After being stationed in Korea, it was withdrawn back to the USSR and transferred to the 5th Army. The staff were stationed in the village of Sibirtsevo, Primorsky Krai.

In 1957, it was reorganized into the 84th Motorized Rifle Division, stationed in the town of Suchan, Primorsky Krai. The division was disbanded on 1 July 1958.

== Bibliography ==
- Feskov, V.I.; Golikov, V.I.; Kalashnikov, K.A.; Slugin, S.A. (2013). Вооруженные силы СССР после Второй Мировой войны: от Красной Армии к Советской [The Armed Forces of the USSR after World War II: From the Red Army to the Soviet: Part 1 Land Forces] (in Russian). Tomsk: Scientific and Technical Literature Publishing. ISBN 9785895035306.
- Glantz, David (1998). Stumbling Colossus: The Red Army on the Eve of World War. Lawrence: University Press of Kansas. ISBN 0-7006-0879-6.
- Glantz, David (2002). The Battle for Leningrad: 1941-1944. Lawrence: University Press of Kansas. ISBN 0-7006-1208-4.
- Taylor, Brian (2003). Barbarossa To Berlin: A Chronology of the Campaigns on the Eastern Front 1941 to 1945. Vol. 1. Kent, England: Spellmount. ISBN 1-86227-206-9.
