= Wangqing County =

Wangqing County 汪清县 · 왕청현
- County
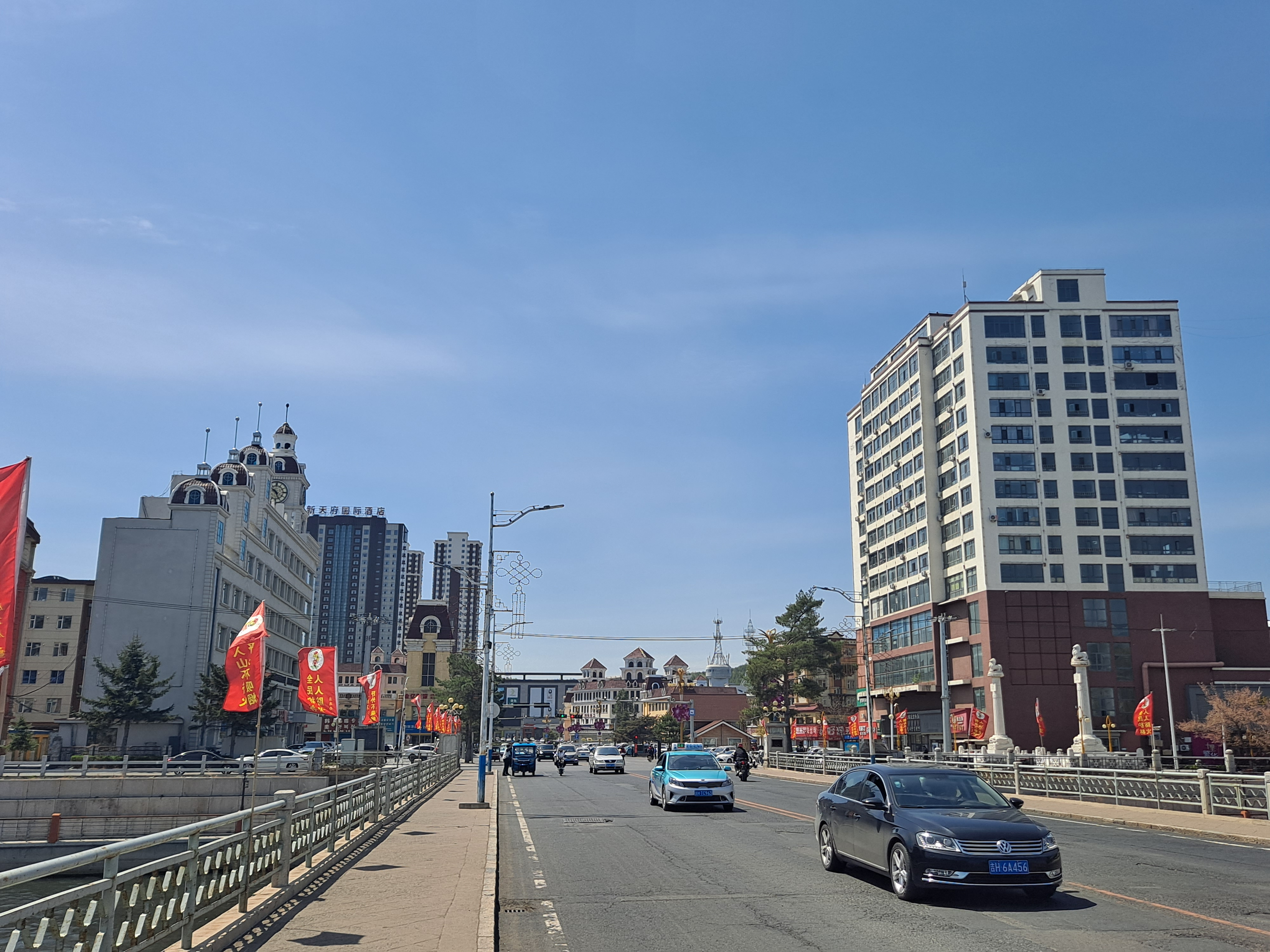

- Location in Jilin
- Coordinates: 43°19′N 129°46′E
- Country: People's Republic of China
- Province: Jilin
- Prefecture: Yanbian
- County seat: Wangqing Town (汪清镇)

Area
  - Total: 8,994 km^{2} (3,473 sq mi)
- Elevation: 236 m (774 ft)

Population
  - Total: 260,000
  - Density: 29/km^{2} (75/sq mi)
- Time zone: UTC+8 (China Standard)
- Postal code: 133200

Wangqing County
- Simplified Chinese: 汪清县
- Traditional Chinese: 汪清縣
Transcriptions
Standard Mandarin
- Hanyu Pinyin: Wāngqīng Xiàn

Chinese Korean name
- Chosŏn'gŭl: 왕청현
Transcriptions
- Revised Romanization: Wangcheong-hyeon
- McCune–Reischauer: Wangch'ŏng-hyŏn

South Korean name
- Hangul: 왕칭현
Transcriptions
- Revised Romanization: Wangching-hyeon
- McCune–Reischauer: Wangch'ing-hyŏn

Wangqing County (simplified Chinese: 汪清县; traditional Chinese: 汪清縣; pinyin: Wāngqīng Xiàn; Korean: 왕칭현) is a county of southeastern Jilin province, China. It is under the administration of the Yanbian Korean Autonomous Prefecture. The county's name Wangqing comes from the Manchu language meaning fortress.

== Administrative divisions ==
Wangqing has eight towns and one township.

Towns:

- Wangqing (汪清镇 / 왕청진)
- Daxinggou (大兴沟镇 / 대흥구진)
- Tianqiaoling (天桥岭镇 / 천교령진)
- Luozigou (罗子沟镇 / 라자구진)
- Chunyang (春阳镇 / 춘양진)
- Fuxing (复兴镇 / 복흥진)
- Baicaogou (百草沟镇 / 백초구진)
- Dongguang (东光镇 / 동광진)

The only township is Jiguan Township (鸡冠乡 / 계관향)

== Climate ==
Climate data for Wangqing, elevation 245 m (804 ft), (1991–2020 normals, extremes 1981–2010)
Month	Jan	Feb	Mar	Apr	May	Jun	Jul	Aug	Sep	Oct	Nov	Dec	Year
Record high °C (°F)	7.2 (45.0)	12.8 (55.0)	20.2 (68.4)	32.2 (90.0)	33.2 (91.8)	37.8 (100.0)	37.3 (99.1)	35.7 (96.3)	31.0 (87.8)	28.0 (82.4)	21.2 (70.2)	10.2 (50.4)	37.8 (100.0)
Mean daily maximum °C (°F)	−6.9 (19.6)	−2.0 (28.4)	5.0 (41.0)	14.3 (57.7)	20.6 (69.1)	24.2 (75.6)	26.6 (79.9)	26.4 (79.5)	22.0 (71.6)	14.6 (58.3)	3.4 (38.1)	−5.2 (22.6)	11.9 (53.5)
Daily mean °C (°F)	−15.3 (4.5)	−10.2 (13.6)	−2.0 (28.4)	6.7 (44.1)	13.1 (55.6)	17.7 (63.9)	21.1 (70.0)	20.7 (69.3)	14.5 (58.1)	6.6 (43.9)	−3.5 (25.7)	−12.5 (9.5)	4.7 (40.6)
Mean daily minimum °C (°F)	−22.0 (−7.6)	−17.4 (0.7)	−8.5 (16.7)	−0.4 (31.3)	6.4 (43.5)	12.5 (54.5)	16.9 (62.4)	16.5 (61.7)	8.8 (47.8)	−0.1 (31.8)	−9.2 (15.4)	−18.5 (−1.3)	−1.2 (29.7)
Record low °C (°F)	−36.3 (−33.3)	−33.1 (−27.6)	−24.2 (−11.6)	−11.2 (11.8)	−3.5 (25.7)	4.0 (39.2)	7.9 (46.2)	3.6 (38.5)	−4.2 (24.4)	−13.6 (7.5)	−27.5 (−17.5)	−33.5 (−28.3)	−36.3 (−33.3)
Average precipitation mm (inches)	6.5 (0.26)	6.5 (0.26)	15.2 (0.60)	28.5 (1.12)	65.5 (2.58)	73.4 (2.89)	121.0 (4.76)	117.2 (4.61)	66.3 (2.61)	32.2 (1.27)	20.5 (0.81)	8.0 (0.31)	560.8 (22.08)
Average precipitation days (≥ 0.1 mm)	3.1	3.7	5.9	8.8	13.7	14.4	13.8	14.3	9.9	7.4	6.1	4.7	105.8
Average snowy days	5.6	6.3	8.0	3.3	0.1	0	0	0	0	1.8	6.0	7.2	38.3
Average relative humidity (%)	65	60	57	55	64	76	81	82	78	66	65	66	68
Mean monthly sunshine hours	180.6	197.6	227.6	215.4	220.1	195.7	181.8	188.7	202.6	199.6	159.5	158.6	2,327.8
Percentage possible sunshine	62	66	61	53	48	43	39	44	55	59	55	57	54
Source: China Meteorological Administration

Climate data for Luozigou Town, Wangqing (1991–2020 normals)
Month	Jan	Feb	Mar	Apr	May	Jun	Jul	Aug	Sep	Oct	Nov	Dec	Year
Mean daily maximum °C (°F)	−9.2 (15.4)	−4.1 (24.6)	3.3 (37.9)	13.1 (55.6)	20.2 (68.4)	24.6 (76.3)	26.9 (80.4)	25.9 (78.6)	21.3 (70.3)	13.5 (56.3)	1.7 (35.1)	−7.1 (19.2)	10.8 (51.5)
Daily mean °C (°F)	−16.8 (1.8)	−12.0 (10.4)	−3.6 (25.5)	5.7 (42.3)	12.6 (54.7)	17.6 (63.7)	20.8 (69.4)	19.7 (67.5)	13.4 (56.1)	5.4 (41.7)	−5.0 (23.0)	−14.0 (6.8)	3.7 (38.6)
Mean daily minimum °C (°F)	−23.2 (−9.8)	−19.4 (−2.9)	−10.3 (13.5)	−1.4 (29.5)	5.4 (41.7)	11.6 (52.9)	15.8 (60.4)	15.1 (59.2)	7.3 (45.1)	−1.4 (29.5)	−10.9 (12.4)	−19.9 (−3.8)	−2.6 (27.3)
Average precipitation mm (inches)	5.3 (0.21)	5.6 (0.22)	12.8 (0.50)	23.9 (0.94)	57.8 (2.28)	74.1 (2.92)	118.5 (4.67)	109.5 (4.31)	59.1 (2.33)	32.6 (1.28)	18.5 (0.73)	7.5 (0.30)	525.2 (20.69)
Average precipitation days (≥ 0.1 mm)	4.2	4.3	7.0	8.9	13.9	14.6	14.9	15.0	11.7	8.4	6.9	5.5	115.3
Average snowy days	7.3	7.0	9.3	5.0	0.2	0	0	0	0.1	2.3	7.9	8.4	47.5
Average relative humidity (%)	64	60	57	54	60	71	78	80	75	65	65	65	66
Mean monthly sunshine hours	193.4	204.5	231.4	219.3	223.8	223.2	207.3	195.3	204.4	205.2	168.9	171.3	2,448
Percentage possible sunshine	67	69	62	54	49	49	45	46	55	61	59	62	57
Source: China Meteorological Administration

== Notable people ==
- Ju To-il, Chinese-born North Korean vice-marshal
