= Far Eastern Front =

Soviet Red Army formation of WWII

The Far Eastern Front (Russian: Дальневосточный фронт) was a front — a level of military formation that is equivalent to army group — of the Red Army during the Second World War.

== Early war service ==
Тhe Far Eastern Front was created on June 28, 1938 from the Special Red Banner Far Eastern Army within the Far East Military District. It included the 1st Red Banner Army and the 2nd Red Banner Army. In 1938 Front forces — seemingly the Soviet 32nd Rifle Division of 39th Rifle Corps — engaged Japanese Manchukuo forces at the Battle of Lake Khasan. On the eve of the invasion of the Soviet Union by Germany, the Front comprised:

- 1st Red Banner Army
  - 26th Rifle Corps
    - 21st Rifle Division
    - 22nd Rifle Division
    - 26th Rifle Division
  - 59th Rifle Corps
    - 39th Rifle Division
    - 59th Rifle Division
  - 1st, 4th, 5th Rifle Brigades
  - 8th Cavalry Division
  - One fortified region, artillery, engineers
- 2nd Red Banner Army
  - 3rd Rifle Division
  - 12th Amurskaya Rifle Division
  - 59th Tank Division
  - 69th Mechanized Division
  - One fortified region, artillery, engineers
- 15th Army
  - 18th Rifle Corps
    - 34th Rifle Division
    - 202nd Airborne Brigade
  - One fortified region, artillery, engineers
- 25th Army
  - 39th Rifle Corps
    - 32nd Rifle Division
    - 40th Rifle Division
    - 92nd Rifle Division
  - Five fortified regions, artillery, and engineers
- Special Rifle Corps
  - 79th Rifle Division
  - 101st Mountain Rifle Division
- 35th Rifle Division
- 66th Rifle Division
- 78th Rifle Division
- Three fortified regions, artillery, engineers

== War against Japan ==
On August 5, 1945, the Front was divided and reorganized as the 1st Far Eastern Front and 2nd Far Eastern Front:

2nd Far Eastern Front, under General M. A. Purkayev (aimed at eastern Manchukuo), including:

- 2nd Red Banner Army.
- 15th Army.
- 16th Army.
- 10th Air Army.

1st Far Eastern Front, under Marshal K. A. Meretskov (aimed at northern Manchukuo), including:

- 1st Red Banner Army.
- 5th Army.
- 25th Army.
- 35th Army
- 9th Air Army
- Chuguevsk Operational Group.
- Amur River Flotilla.

Transbaikal Front included the 12th Air Army.

In the Soviet invasion of Manchuria it led the attack into Japanese-occupied Manchuria. Although the Kwantung Army of the Imperial Japanese Army had more than 1 million soldiers, the Japanese defenders were overwhelmed by the offensive. Allied forces of Mongolia and Chiang Kai-shek's Nationalist China aided the Soviet operation. On August 19, the Far East Front continued its routing of the Kwantung Army by capturing Harbin and Mukden. By August 21, the Red Army had captured almost all of Manchuria, and the final surrender of the Kwantung Army took place.

On August 11 to 12, 1945, the 87th Rifle Corps was brought out from the reserve of the 1st Far Eastern Front, and received new orders to prepare for landing operations on the island of Hokkaido (Japan); however, the planned operation never took place, although elements of the 87th Corps participated in other operations against Japanese forces in the theatre.

On September 30, 1945, the Primorskiy (Maritime Provinces) Military District was formed on the territory of Primorsky Krai (territory of the former Ussuri Oblast), from HQ 1st Far East Front.

== Commanders ==
- Marshal of the Soviet Union Vasily K. Blukher (1 July – 4 September, 1938)
- Komkor Grigori M. Shtern (August 1938; July 1940 – January 1941)
- Colonel General Iosif R. Apanasenko [promoted to Army General in February 1941] (January 1941 – April 1943)
- Colonel General Maxim A. Purkaev [promoted to Army General in October 1944] (April 1943 – August 1945)
