= Leonty Cheremisov =

Soviet general (1893–1967)

Leonty Georgyevich Cheremisov
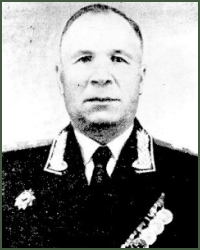
- Born: 1 July 1893; Lysye Gory, Atkarsky Uyezd, Saratov Governorate, Russian Empire
- Died: 17 November 1967 (aged 74); Orenburg, Soviet Union
- Military career
- Allegiance: Russian Empire; Soviet Russia; Soviet Union
- Branch: Imperial Russian Army; Red Army (became Soviet Army)
- Service years: 1915–1917; 1919–1958
- Rank: Lieutenant-general
- Commands: 68th Mountain Rifle Division; 20th Rifle Corps; 15th Army; 16th Army
- Conflicts: World War I; Russian Civil War; World War II
- Awards: Order of Lenin; Order of the Red Banner (3); Order of Kutuzov, 1st class

Leonty Georgyevich Cheremisov (Russian: Леонтий Георгиевич Черемисов; 1 July 1893 – 17 November 1967) was a Soviet Red Army lieutenant general who led the 16th Army in the Soviet Far East during World War II from 1943 to 1945.

== Early life, World War I, and Russian Civil War ==
Cheremisov was born to a peasant family on 1 July 1893 in the village of Lysye Gory, Atkarsky Uyezd, Saratov Governorate. He was drafted into the Imperial Russian Army in September 1915 during World War I. He graduated from a training detachment and became a private (ryadovoy). After graduating from the Gatchina School of Praporshchiks in 1917, Cheremisov served as an assistant company commander with the rank an ensign (praporshchik). He fought in the Russian Civil War after joining the Red Army in 1919, serving as a company, battalion, and regimental commander. Cheremisov fought on the Southern and Eastern Fronts, participating in the suppression of the Sapozhnikov revolt. In July 1920 he became commander of the 511th Separate Rifle Battalion of the 292nd Rifle Regiment of the 33rd Kuban Rifle Division, and later led the regiment itself.

== Interwar period ==
After the end of the war, Cheremisov served with the 27th Rifle Division as assistant commander of the 240th Tver Rifle Regiment from October 1921, becoming regimental commander in January 1922. He transferred to command the 239th Kursk Rifle Regiment in May 1922 but a month later became a battalion commander in the regiment. He served as acting assistant commander of the 80th Rifle Regiment from August 1923 and then the 79th Rifle Regiment from December of that year. After becoming chief of the school of the division in February 1924, Cheremisov served as assistant battalion commander in the 79th Regiment from September. Graduating from the Vystrel course in 1925, he became a battalion commander in the 79th in August of that year. From February 1926 he served as assistant commander of the 99th Orenburg Rifle Regiment of the 33rd Rifle Division, becoming its chief of staff in October 1926, after graduating from Courses of Improvement for Higher Officers at the Frunze Military Academy in April 1930, its commander.

In April 1932 Cheremisov transferred to serve as assistant commander of the 81st Rifle Division, then shifted to the same position in the 43rd Rifle Division later that year in November. Transferred to the reserve, he became chief of the combat training department of the western region of OSOAVIAKHIM in October 1934. Cheremisov graduated from the external faculty of the Frunze Military Academy in 1938 and was appointed commander of the 68th Mountain Rifle Division in March of that year after being promoted to kombrig on 20 February, then advanced to command the 20th Rifle Corps in the Soviet Far East in February 1939. Given the rank of major general on 4 June 1940 when the Red Army introduced general officer ranks, he took command of the new 15th Army a month later.

== World War II ==
After the beginning of Operation Barbarossa, Cheremisov remained with the 15th Army in the Soviet Far East. He was replaced in command of the army in November and became assistant commander for higher educational institutions of the Far Eastern Front. Cheremisov returned to army command on 8 September 1943 when he was appointed commander of the recently formed 16th Army. The army spent the rest of the war covering the Soviet–Japanese border on Sakhalin. He led the army in the Soviet–Japanese War as part of the 2nd Far Eastern Front, during which it conducted the Invasion of South Sakhalin and the Invasion of the Kuril Islands, being was promoted to lieutenant general on 8 September 1945.

== Postwar ==
After the end of the war, Cheremisov briefly became commandant of the 103rd Fortified Region in the Far Eastern Military District after the 16th Army was disbanded. He served as deputy commander of the Primorsky Military District from 1946 and assistant commander of the South Ural Military District for higher educational institutions from 1948. Cheremisov was dismissed from the Soviet Army in 1958, and died in Orenburg on 17 November 1967.

== Honors and awards ==
Cheremisov received the following decorations:

- Order of Lenin
- Order of the Red Banner (3)
- Order of Kutuzov, 1st class
