= Viktor Chechevatov =

Russian military commander

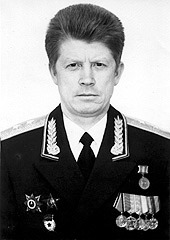
- General-Lieutenant Chechevatov
- Born: Viktor Stepanovich Chechevatov; April 15, 1945 (age 81); Mordovskiy Belyi Klyuch, Ulyanovsk Oblast, RSFSR, Soviet Union
- Allegiance: Soviet Union → Russia
- Branch: Soviet Army → Russian Ground Forces
- Service years: 1962–2005
- Rank: Colonel general
- Commands: Military Academy of General Staff; Far Eastern Military District; Kyiv Military District; Carpathian Military District (first deputy); Central Asian Military District (chief of staff)
- Conflicts: Soviet coup d'état attempt
- Spouse: Lidiya Andreevna

Viktor Stepanovich Chechevatov (Russian: Виктор Степанович Чечеватов; born 15 April 1945, Mordovskiy Belyi Klyuch, Ulyanovsk Oblast, Russian SFSR) is a Russian military and public official, Colonel General who served as commander for several military districts in the Soviet Union and Russia, director of the Russian Customs Academy and the Military Academy of General Staff.

== Early life ==
Chechevatov was born in Russian peasant family in village Mordovskiy Belyi Klyuch, Ulyanovsk Oblast in Midstream Volga region. A graduate of Ulyanovsk Tank School in 1966, in 1973 he finished Military Academy of Armored Forces and in 1984 Chechevatov graduated with a gold medal Academy of General Staff.

== Military service for the USSR ==
Chechevatov started his military career in Belarusian Military District where he served until 1982. In 1982 he took command of the 45th Guards Tank Training Division. Since 1984 he was a commander of the 3rd Combined Arms Army (Group of Soviet Forces in Germany) based in the German Democratic Republic. In 1987–1989 Chechevatov was appointed as a chief of staff in Central Asia Military District.

In 1989–1992 he served in the Ukrainian SSR at first as a first deputy commander of Carpathian Military District and in 1991–1992 as a commander of Kyiv Military District. In 1991, while in Kyiv, he actively supported the State Committee on the State of Emergency, because of which was suspended from command. In January 1992 for refusal to accept oath of allegiance to Ukrainian people, Chechevatov was removed from command and has requested to be transferred to Russia. At the same time the Union of Military Officers of Ukraine not groundlessly raised an issue of corruption in Kyiv Military District against Chechevatov and the General Presecutor's Office of Ukraine instigated a criminal proceeding against former Soviet general.

== Post USSR military service ==
In April 1992 he was appointed in command of Russian Far Eastern Military District. In December 1995 an initiative group of voters nominated General Viktor Chechevatov as a presidential candidate for the 1996 Russian presidential election, but Chechevatov soon withdrew his nomination in favor of Boris Yeltsin. Earlier in 1995 there was information that he was offered a post of First Deputy Commander of Russian Ground Forces in place of the sacked Eduard Vorobyov. Also, there was an incident with his son Andrei Chechevatov (also military officer) who was involved in street shooting as part of road rage which led to casualties, but no prosecutions against Andrei. Yeltsin met with Chechevatov in May 1996 when he was on official trip to China. Following the presidential elections in July 1996 President of Russia Boris Yeltsin personally has invited Chechevatov to Kremlin when an issue has been raised about appointing a candidate to the post of Minister of Defense of the Russian Federation after dismissal of Pavel Grachev due to the First Chechen War. At that time mass media have informed about offer to Chechevatov to take the post of minister and his refusal from it. After the meeting with Yeltsin, the post of minister was given to Igor Radionov.

On 27 February 1997 Yeltsin again met with Chechevatov in Kremlin when his candidacy was presented to post of the commander-in-chief of Ground Forces, but was not approved. Later in 1997 Chechevatov participated in scandalous meeting of the Russia Defense Council at which were sacked from their posts Minister of Defense Igor Radionov and Chief of General Staff Viktor Samsonov and during which right in the course of the meeting Yeltsin offered Chechevatov to take the post of Chief of General Staff. In respond the General asked President about a five-minute confidential conversation, after which the issue about his new post was never raised again. What they talked about is not known, but the General Staff office was headed not by Chechvatov, but Anatoly Kvashnin. In the beginning of 1998 Chechevatov turned out to be involved in a conflict situation between Naval and Ground forces caused by the actions of the Ministry of Defense to "optimize the structure of the armed forces".

Due to the start of the 1999 NATO bombing of Yugoslavia, in March 1999 Chechevatov declared that he is ready to head any military formation of volunteer or regular armed forces to help Yugoslavia and called other volunteers to go to Yugoslavia. In his letter to Yeltsin, Colonel General Chechevatov stated that bombing of Yugoslavia may turned out in the near future to be just a rehearsal of similar strikes on Russia. In context of the Kosovo issue, the name of Chechevatov also was raised in negotiations between Boris Yeltsin and Bill Clinton when after complaining to Clinton that communists pursue Yeltsin to send forces to Yugoslavia, President of Russia told that he even fired Chechevatov who wanted to deploy a battalion to help Milošević. In August 1999 Chechevatov was appointed a director of Military Academy of General Staff.

== Retirement ==
Chechevatov officially retired in 2005. In 2005–06 he actively was involved in public life and held number of office in various public organizations such as "Nakaznoy Ataman" of the "Far Eastern Military Cossack District" as well as Chairman of the Board of Trustees, under the auspices of Grand Duchess Maria Vladimirovna, a head of House of Romanov and Foundation of the Cavaliers Duma of the Imperial Military Order of St. Nicholas the Wonderworker. In July 2006 Chechevatov was appointed a rector of Russia Customs Academy.

== Awards ==
- Order of Military Merit
- Order of the Red Star
- Order "For Service to the Homeland in the Armed Forces of the USSR" (2nd and 3rd classes)

Military offices
Preceded by Boris Gromov	Commander of the Kyiv Military District (Soviet Union); 1991–1992	Succeeded by Valentyn Boryskin as in Ukraine
Preceded by Viktor Novozhilov	Commander of the Far Eastern Military District; 1992–1999	Succeeded by Yuri Yakubov
Preceded by Valery Tretyakov	Chief of the Military Academy of the General Staff of the Armed Forces of Russia; 1999–2005	Succeeded by Ivan Yefremov
