= 39th Separate Guards Motor Rifle Brigade =

Motor rifle division of the Red Army

39th Motor Rifle Brigade (2009-Present) 33rd Separate Motor Rifle Division (1964-2009) 56th Motor Rifle Division (1957-1964) 56th Rifle Division (1955-1957) 342nd Rifle Division (1944-1955) Blagoveshchensk Fortified Region (1932-1944)
- Active: 1932-Present
- Country: Soviet Union (1932–1991); Russia (1991–Present)
- Branch: Red Army (1932-1946); Soviet Army (1946-1991); Russian Ground Forces (1991-present)
- Type: Mechanized Infantry
- Size: Brigade
- Part of: Eastern Military District; 68th Army Corps
- Garrison/HQ: Yuzhno-Sakhalinsk Airport
- Engagements: World War II: Soviet invasion of Manchuria; Invasion of the Kuril Islands; Russo-Ukrainian War: Russian invasion of Ukraine; Pokrovsk offensive
- Decorations: Order of the Red Banner
- Battle honours: Guards

Insignia
- Identification symbol

The 39th Guards Red Banner Motor Rifle Brigade (Russian: 39-я отдельная гвардейская мотострелковая Краснознамённая бригада; 39 омсбр; MUN 35390) is a mechanized infantry brigade in the Russian Ground Forces. Originally formed as the Blagoveshchensk Fortified Region of the Soviet Union's Red Army in 1932, it became the basis for the 2nd formation of the 342nd Rifle Division and took part in the Soviet invasion of Manchuria. During the Cold War, it was reformed as the 56th Motor Rifle Division and later re-designated as the 33rd Separate Motor Rifle Division. In 2009, it was downsized and reorganized into the 39th Separate Motor Rifle Brigade as part of the 2008 Russian military reform.

== Pre-war origin ==
The 33rd MRD has a most unusual lineage which begun with the order by the Special Red Banner Far Eastern Army (OKDVA) No. 30/010 dated 18 March 1932 to the 4th Directorate of Works to construct the Blagoveshchensk Fortified Region (Russian: укрепрайон) UR, with the goal of protecting the left bank of the Amur river. Subsequently, another order was issued (No. 176/72) on 31 October 1932, directing that the Fortified Region be included in the Army order of battle. The newly constituted Fortified Region was numbered 101st UR and included the following units:

- 108th Independent machine-gun battalion;
- 256th Independent machine-gun battalion.

By the order of the Peoples' Commissar of the Military District No.0030 of 5 July 1939, the Fortified District became a part of the newly created Front Group and was subordinated to the 2nd Independent Red-Banner Far Eastern Army.

From 1 August to 1 December 1939, on the basis of the 189th Independent Rifle Regiment of the Blagoveshchensk UR of the 2nd Independent Red-banner Far Eastern Army, were formed 20 independent platoons of (Russian: капонирная) caponier artillery, each with 11 personnel, altogether 220 people, according to the personnel establishment No. 9/913.

== World War II Service ==
In October – November 1941 in the city of Blagoveshchensk of the Amur region, on the basis of the 189th independent Rifle Regiment of the Blagoveshchensk UR, were formed the 1st and 2nd Independent Rifle Brigades of the 101st Fortified Region (2nd Red Banner Army of the Far Eastern Front). On 17 March 1942 the two brigades became the 258th and 259th Independent Rifle Brigades.

On 22 November 1944 the 342nd Rifle Division (2nd formation) of 2nd Red Banner Army of the Far-Eastern Front was formed in the environs of Blagoveshchensk (Amur region) on the basis of 258th independent Rifle Brigade and 259th independent Rifle Brigade. The commemorative formation day of the division was set on 1 December 1944. The following units were included in the division's formation at the time:

- 357th Rifle Regiment;
- 377th Rifle Regiment;
- 389th Rifle Regiment;
- 39th Artillery Regiment;
- 480th Self-propelled Artillery Battalion;
- 171st Independent Anti-Tank Destroyer Artillery Battalion;
- 162nd Combat Engineer Battalion;
- 1036th Independent Signal Battalion;
- 236th Medical and Sanitary Battalion;
- 58th Independent Reconnaissance Company;
- 571st Motor transport Company;
- 22nd Chemical Protection Company.

The 357th Rifle Regiment was formed from the 2nd and 3rd sub-machine gun battalions of the 258th independent Rifle Brigade in the village Novotroitskoe of the Blagoveshchensk region (Amur region) about 20–25 km from Blagoveshchensk, and its first regimental commander was Major I.T. Rudnik.

On 15 March 1945 according to the Decree of the Supreme Soviet of the USSR, the 357th Rifle Regiment was entrusted with its combat banner.

In the middle of May 1945 the 342nd Rifle Division was brought out into the dunes along the Amur where it began to create the second defence entrenchment line. The division built defensive installations for two more months, then force marched 60 kilometers, and began work on new entrenchments.

In July 1945 the 342nd Rifle Division was included in the composition of the 87th Rifle Corps of the Coastal Group of Forces (subsequently the 1st Far East Front). The division was relocated into the Ussuri Krai, and lived in camp tents near Lesozavodsk.

At the start of military operations against Japan, the 87th Rifle Corps was in the reserve of the 1st Far-Eastern Front and was located in the region of the town of Lesozavodsk.

== After the invasion of Manchuria ==
On the night of 2 September 1945 the division was embarked on transports and was directed to the occupation of islands Iturup and Urup. Two regiments landed on Iturup island, an artillery regiment (less a battalion) and the staff of the division, while on the island of Urup two other regiments were landed.

The 342nd RD completed a 100 kilometer march from Kholmsk to Korsakov and during the march celebrated the great Victory Day on 3 September 1945.

One division and the 113th Rifle Brigade were located in the southern part of the Kurile Islands, and two other rifle divisions in the southern part of Sakhalin Island, strengthened by one tank brigade from the front assets.

In Korsakov, the division was living in dugouts, and then began to build barracks at the station Dachnaya (389th RR). The division spent two winters living in the tents. After the war, Anita township on Sakhalin became the garrison of the 357th Rifle Regiment.

== Post-war service ==
By the directive of the Stavka of the Military High Command from 10 September 1945 to 15 October 1945 2nd Far East Front was re-designated the Far East Military District with the staff in the city of Toyokhara (now Yuzhno Sakhalinsk).

By 30 December 1945 all rifle divisions of the military district were reorganized with the new organization (with the divisional artillery brigades) and were authorized an establishment of 8132 personnel each.

In 1948 the 192nd Tank self-propelled Regiment was formed from personnel of the 342nd Rifle Division on the base of the 480th independent self-propelled Artillery Battalion.

In October 1953, by the order of the Minister of Defense of the USSR dated 23 April 1953, the staff of the Far East Military District, the former 2nd Far-Eastern Front, was reformed into the administration of the 15th Army, with its headquarters at Yuzhno-Sakhalinsk. The command staff of the 87th Rifle Corps was brought back to the continent.

On 4 March 1955, units were renumbered. 87th Rifle Corps was re-formed into 2nd Rifle Corps; the 342nd Rifle Division was renamed the 56th Rifle Division; and the 258th Rifle Red Banner Division – became the 41st Rifle Red Banner Division (144th and 465th Rifle Regiments).

In March 1957, rifle divisions were reformed into motor-rifle divisions. On 17 May 1957, the 56th Rifle Division became the 56th Motor Rifle Division (in this case the 357th Rifle Regiment was renamed as the 390th Rifle Regiment); The 41st Rifle Red Banner Division was renamed the 41st Motor-Rifle Red Banner Division; and the 79th Rifle Sakhalin Division was renamed the 79th Motor Rifle Sakhalin Division.

On 28 March 1960 the 2nd Army Corps was reformed at Yuzhno-Sakhalinsk, Sakhalin Oblast. It became part of the 51st Army in 1977, and the unit would stay under the 51st Army's command until 1997.

On 17 November 1964 the 56th Motor Rifle Division was renamed the 33rd Separate Motor Rifle Division.

The division was moved into the 68th Army Corps in 1997.

The composition of the division in 1988 was:

- Headquarters Khomutovo
- 377th Motor Rifle Regiment (Dolinsk, Sakhalinskaya Oblast)
- 389th Motor Rifle Regiment (Dachnoye, Sakhalinskaya Oblast)
- 465th Motor Rifle Regiment (Aniva, Sakhalinskaya Oblast)
- 97th independent Tank Battalion (Khomutovo, Sakhalinskaya Oblast)
- 989th Artillery Regiment (Dachnoye, Sakhalinskaya Oblast)
- 1108th Anti-Aircraft Missile Regiment (Dolinsk, Sakhalinskaya Oblast)
- 88th Independent Missile Battalion (Listvennichnoye, Sakhalinskaya Oblast)
- 785th Independent Reconnaissance Battalion (Yuzhno-Sakhalinsk, Sakhalinskaya Oblast)
- 162nd Independent Engineer-Sapper Battalion (Listvennichnoye, Sakhalinskaya Oblast)
- 419th Independent Communications Battalion (Khomutovo, Sakhalinskaya Oblast)
- 145th Independent Chemical Defence Battalion (Yuzhno-Sakhalinsk, Sakhalinskaya Oblast)
- 163rd Independent Equipment Maintenance and Recovery Battalion (Khomutovo, Sakhalinskaya Oblast)
- 236th Independent Medical Battalion (Aniva, Sakhalinskaya Oblast)
- 1488th Independent Material Supply Battalion (Yuzhno-Sakhalinsk, Sakhalinskaya Oblast)

On 1 June 2009 it was downsized and renamed the 39th Separate Motor Rifle Brigade as part of the 2008 Russian military reform, which sought to reduce division-sized ground units into more flexible brigades.

The unit has been involved in the Russian invasion of Ukraine, having its scheduled deployment to Syria cancelled to make up for manpower shortfalls. The commander of the brigade, Colonel Marat Gadzhibalaev, was killed in Ukraine on 27 December 2022 after a Russian command post was destroyed by Ukrainian artillery. The brigade received the Guards title on 8 July 2023.

== See also ==
- Invasion of the Kuril Islands
