= 267th Division =

267th Division may refer to:

- 267th Infantry Division, Wehrmacht, Germany
- 267th Rifle Division, Soviet Union

== See also ==
- List of military divisions by number
