= 15th Army (Soviet Union) =

Red Army field army of WWII

- 15-я армия
- Active: 1940–1945; 1953–1967; 1969–1993
- Country: Soviet Union
- Branch: Red Army
- Type: Combined arms
- Size: Field army
- Part of: Far Eastern Front
- Engagements: Winter War; Soviet invasion of Manchuria

Commanders
- Notable commanders: Michael Savushkin

The 15th Army (Russian: 15-я армия) was a field army of the Soviet Red Army during the Second World War.

The 15th Army, as part of the 8th Army, took part in the Winter War from 12 February to 13 March.

Reformed at Birobidzhan, Soviet Union, from the 2nd Red Banner Army in June 1940. It formed in July 1940 as part of the Far Eastern Front. Until August 1945 the army defended the Far Eastern borders of the USSR. On 5 August it was incorporated into the newly created 2nd Far Eastern Front. On 9 August, during the Soviet–Japanese War, the 15th Army, consisting of shock troops, participated in the Sungari operation. Its advance units entered Harbin on 20 August. Through the end of August, the 15th Army destroyed the scattered pieces of the Japanese Kwantung Army. Conducted border operations through mid-1945. Participated in the Soviet invasion of Manchuria and the crossing of the Amur River in August 1945.

Composition April 1943

- 34th Rifle Division
- 39th Rifle Division
- Novoye Fortified Area
- 203rd Tank Brigade

Composition August 1945

- 34th Rifle Division
- 361st Rifle Division
- 388th Rifle Division
- 171st Tank Brigade

In October 1953, by the order of the Minister of Defense of the USSR dated 23 April 1953, the staff of the Far East Military District, the former 2nd Far-Eastern Front, was reorganised as the staff of the 15th Army, with its headquarters at Yuzhno-Sakhalinsk.

In May 1957, rifle divisions were reformed into motor rifle divisions. On 17 May 1957, the 56th Rifle Division became the 56th Motor Rifle Division (in this case the 357th Rifle Regiment was renamed as the 390th Rifle Regiment); The 41st Rifle Red Banner Division was renamed the 41st Motor-Rifle Red Banner Division. The 79th Rifle Sakhalin Division was renamed the 79th Motor-Rifle Sakhalin Division. All three newly renamed divisions formed part of the 15th Army.

On 1 April 1958 the 41st Red Banner Motor Rifle Division was disbanded.

In 1960 the army headquarters was moved to Khabarovsk on the mainland and assigned a new division, the 129th Motor Rifle Division at Khabarovsk. After briefly being renamed the 18th Army in 1967-69 it was renamed back to the 15th Army and assigned several new divisions, the 73rd Motor Rifle Division arriving from the North Caucasus Military District in mid 1968, two fortified areas being assigned (the 2nd and 17th), the 270th Motor Rifle Division being formed in 1970, and the 81st Guards and 135th Motor Rifle Divisions being transferred from the disbanding 45th Army Corps in November 1972.

In October 1993 the 15th Army was renamed the 43rd Army Corps.

== Commanders ==
- Mikhail Kovalyov (12 February 1940 – 25 February 1940)
- Vladimir Kurdyumov (25 February 1940 – 28 March 1940)
- Leonty Cheremisov (July 1940 – November 1941)
- Michael Savushkin ( November 1941 – October 1942)
- Stepan Mamonov ( October 1942 – August 1945)
- Nikolay Krylov (April 1953 – September 1953)
- Semyon Kozak (September 1953 – December 1953)
- Nikolai Trufanov (January 1954 – January 1956)
