= 346th Division =

346th Division may refer to:

- 346th Infantry Division, Wehrmacht, Germany
- 346th Rifle Division, Soviet Union

== See also ==
- List of military divisions by number
