= Nikolai Trufanov =

Nikolai Ivanovich Trufanov
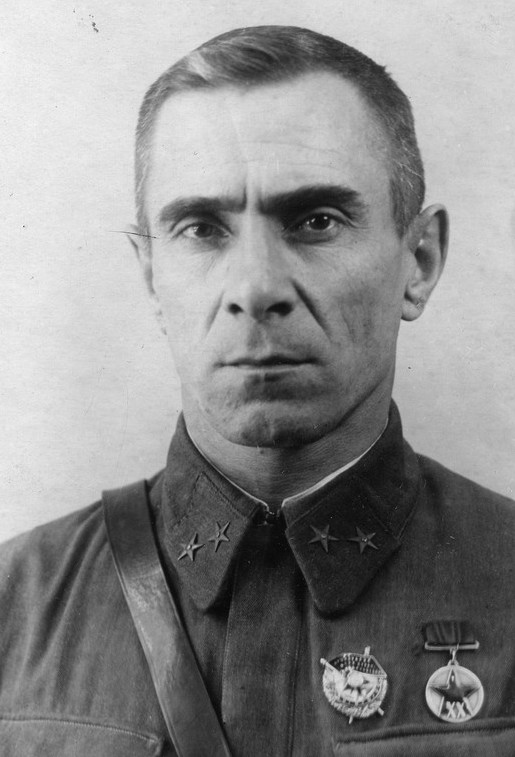
- Born: 15 May 1900; Yaroslavl Governorate, Russian Empire
- Died: 12 February 1982 (aged 81) Moscow, Soviet Union
- Allegiance: Russian Empire; Soviet Union
- Branch: Soviet Red Army
- Rank: Colonel general
- Commands: 51st Army; 25th Rifle Corps; 15th Army
- Conflicts: Russian Civil War; World War II

Nikolai Ivanovich Trufanov (Russian: Никола́й Ива́нович Труфа́нов; 15 May 1900 – 12 February 1982) was a Soviet Colonel General who fought in World War II.

== Biography ==
He was born on May 15, 1900, in the Yaroslavl Governorate in a poor family. At the age of 19 he joined the Red Army, participated in the Russian Civil War, and served in the cavalry division of Grigory Kotovsky. In 1925 he graduated from the VTsIK military school and in 1939 he graduated from the Frunze Military Academy. He participated in the Soviet-Finnish war as chief of staff of the 4th Infantry Division.

In August 1941, he participated in the Anglo-Soviet invasion of Iran as Chief of Staff of the 28th Mechanized Corps. In July 1942 he was appointed commander of the 51st Army, was soon removed from office, but reappointed in October and commanded the army until February 1943.

Since June 1943, he was deputy commander of the 69th Army. Since March 1945, the commander of the 25th Rifle Corps on the 2nd Ukrainian and 1st Belorussian Front. During the war he took part in the Battle of Stalingrad, the Battle of the Caucasus, the Battle of Rostov (1943) and a number of other battles and operations. He fought also in the Battle of Berlin.

At the end of the war until October 19, 1945, he was a military commandant of the city of Leipzig, then Chief of Commandant's Service Section, Soviet Military Administration, Saxony, and from December 1946, Commanding Officer Soviet Military Administration in Mecklenburg. He was promoted to lieutenant general on 11 July 1945.

Since June 1950, he was Head of the Directorate of Combat and Physical Training of the Far Eastern Military District. Since January 1954, Commander of the 15th Combined Arms Army on Sakhalin Island. Since January 1956, first deputy Commander of the Far Eastern Military District. Since June 1957, chief military adviser, then senior military specialist of the Minister of Defense of the People's Republic of China.

He retired in 1960.
