= 342nd Division =

342nd Division may refer to:

- 342nd Infantry Division, Wehrmacht, Germany
- 342nd Rifle Division, Soviet Union

== See also ==
- List of military divisions by number
