= Pavel Batov =

Red Army general during the Second World War

Pavel Ivanovich Batov
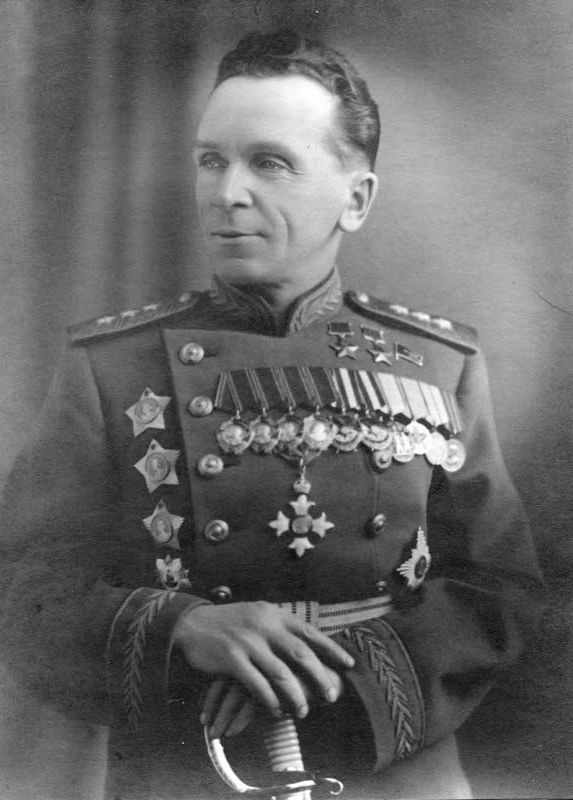
- Born: June 1, 1897; Filisovo, Rybinsk, Yaroslavl Governorate, Russian Empire
- Died: April 19, 1985 (aged 88); Moscow, Russian SFSR, Soviet Union
- Burial place: Novodevichy Cemetery, Moscow
- Military career
- Allegiance: Russian Empire (1915–1917); Soviet Union (1917–1965)
- Service years: 1915–1965
- Rank: General of the Army
- Commands: 10th Rifle Corps; 3rd Rifle Corps; 9th Separate Rifle Corps; 51st Army; 3rd Army; 4th Tank Army; 65th Army; 7th Mechanised Army; 11th Guards Army; Carpathian Military District; Baltic Military District; Southern Group of Forces
- Conflicts: World War I Russian Civil War; Spanish Civil War; World War II; Hungarian Revolution of 1956
- Awards: Hero of the Soviet Union (twice); Cross of St. George
- Other work: Chief of the Soviet Veterans Committee (1970–1981)

Pavel Ivanovich Batov (Russian: Па́вел Ива́нович Ба́тов; 1 June [O.S. 20 May] 1897 – April 19, 1985) was a senior Red Army general during the Second World War and afterwards, twice Hero of the Soviet Union. Batov fought in World War I, where he was awarded the Cross of St. George twice. After being wounded in 1917, he was sent to a school in Petrograd and joined the Bolsheviks. He fought in the Russian Civil War and became an advisor with the XII International Brigade during the Spanish Civil War. During World War II, Batov commanded the 51st Army in the Crimea. In 1942, he became the commander of the 3rd Army and then the 4th Tank Army, which was renamed the 65th Army. Postwar, Batov commanded the Carpathian Military District.

== Early military career ==
Born in Filisovo in 1897, Batov began his military career during World War I. In 1915, he enlisted in a student command and then served as a scout in the 3rd Infantry Regiment of the Life Guards. During this service, he displayed considerable bravery and was awarded with two Crosses of St. George and two lesser medals. After being wounded in action in 1917, he was assigned to an NCO school in Petrograd where political agitator A. Savkov brought him into the Bolshevik movement.

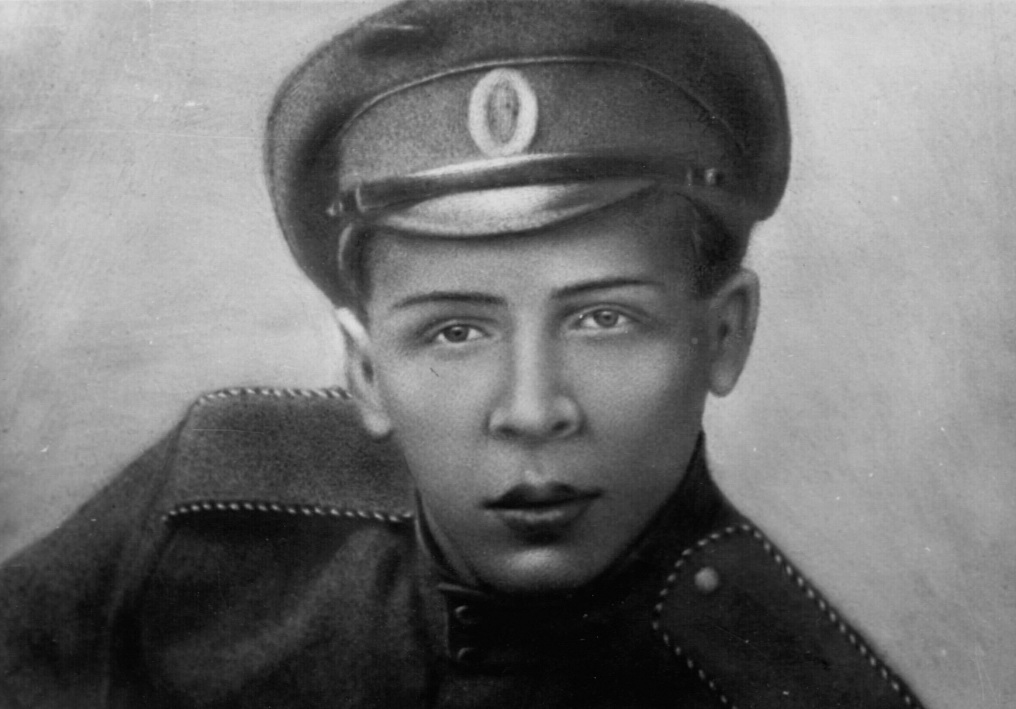
Pavel Batov in 1916

Batov served for four years in the Red Army during the Civil War, initially as a machine gunner, and also as assistant military chief of the Rybinsk Military Committee, his first staff work. He was given command of a company in 1926, and was chosen to attend the Vystrel Officer's School the same year, where he met many future senior officers of the wartime Red Army. He joined the Communist Party in 1929.

In 1927, Batov was promoted to command a battalion of the prestigious 1st Moscow Proletarian Rifle Division. He would serve in this unit for the next nine years, rising to command of the 3rd Regiment. His divisional commander in 1936 wrote:

Comrade Batov has commanded a regiment for more than three years. In the course of that time, the regiment has occupied first place in the division in all categories of combat and political training. In tactical training, the regiment stands out as superb; I always sent the regiment out on the main axis.

Batov soon received the "Sign of Honour" medal, and completed the Frunze Academy by correspondence course.

== Spanish Civil War ==
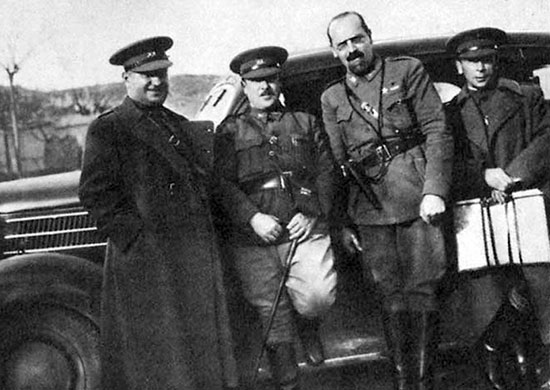
Batov (furthest right) in XII International Brigade during the Spanish Civil War

Batov was selected to "volunteer" for service in the Spanish Civil War, under the nom de guerre Fritz Pablo. He first served as military adviser to the Hungarian communist Máté Zalka, who commanded the XII International Brigade defending the approaches to Madrid. He fought on the Teruel Front and was wounded twice and won his first Orders of Lenin and of the Red Banner as a result. After recovering, he fought at Jarama, alongside A.I Rodimtsev, at the Guadalajara and on the Aragon front, where he was wounded again.

== Occupation of Poland and the Winter War ==
Returning to the Soviet Union in December 1937, Batov successively commanded the 10th Rifle Corps and 3rd Rifle Corps, the latter of which he led in the Soviet occupation of eastern Poland in September 1939. The corps later transferred to the Finnish front, and fought in the second phase (February – March 1940) of the Russian-Finnish War in the Karelian sector under 13th Army. For his services in Finland, Batov was awarded a second Order of Lenin, promoted to divisional commander (Komdiv) and, in June, to lieutenant general. He was then appointed deputy commander of the Transcaucasus Military District. The outbreak of war with Germany would find him deep in the south of the USSR.

== World War II ==
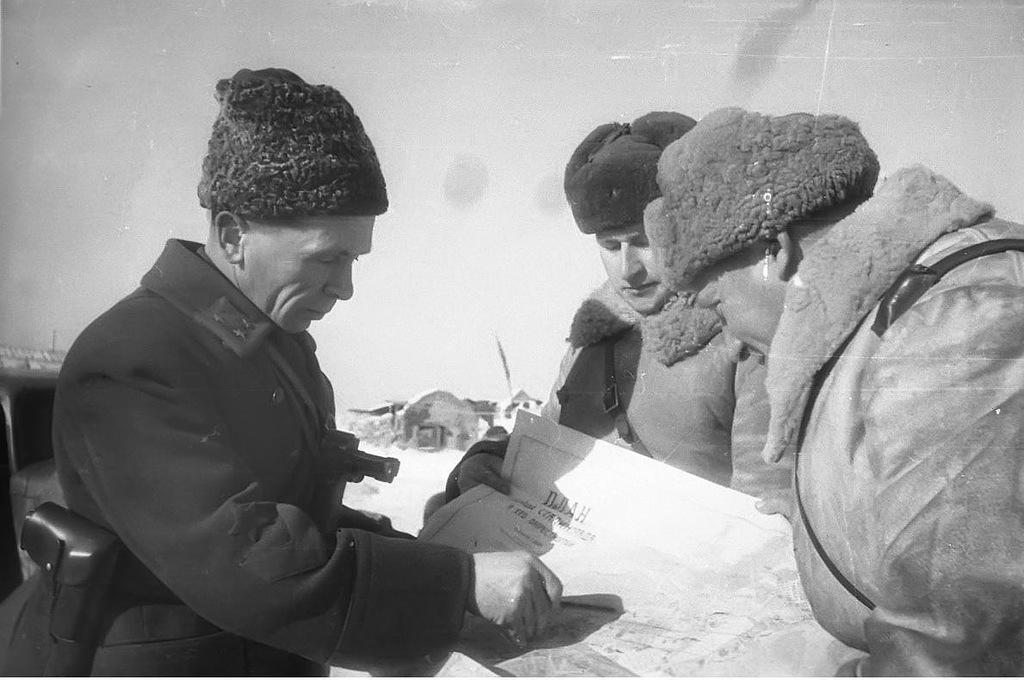
Batov (left) in Stalingrad

In June 1941, Batov was in command of the 9th Separate Rifle Corps, which comprised the 106th and 156th Rifle Divisions and the 32nd Cavalry Division, with a total strength of about 35,000 men. This corps was the only major Red Army formation in the Crimea at the outbreak of Operation Barbarossa, and Batov had arrived at its headquarters in Simferopol just two days earlier. Later in 1941, he was made deputy commander of the 51st Army, and following the evacuation of that army from the Kerch Peninsula he rose again to full command. Although the Crimea had been lost, Batov was exonerated by Stalin.

In January 1942, he joined the Bryansk Front as commander of the 3rd Army, and later as deputy commander for training of the Front, under Lt. Gen. K. K. Rokossovski. Rokossovski noted that Batov preferred active command to "sitting in the headquarters", and that his current role was "a burden" to him. Batov and Rokossovski formed a professional and personal bond that would last beyond the latter's death in 1968, and Batov would continue to serve under Rokossovski's command until the end of the war.

On October 22, 1942, Batov was moved to command of the 4th Tank Army on the approaches to Stalingrad, replacing Mjr. Gen. V.D. Kryuchenkin. This army, soon renamed the 65th Army, formed part of Rokossovski's Don Front. Batov remained in command of 65th Army for the duration. He helped to plan the Soviet counteroffensive, Operation Uranus, providing key intelligence to Gen. Zhukov regarding the boundaries between German and Romanian forces. His army formed a key strike force in this offensive, and the subsequent Operation Ring, which reduced and defeated the encircled Axis forces. Rokossovski later wrote:

[He] displayed fine initiative with an improvised mobile task force... By striking at the enemy's flank and rear, the task force ensured the swift advance of the other units.

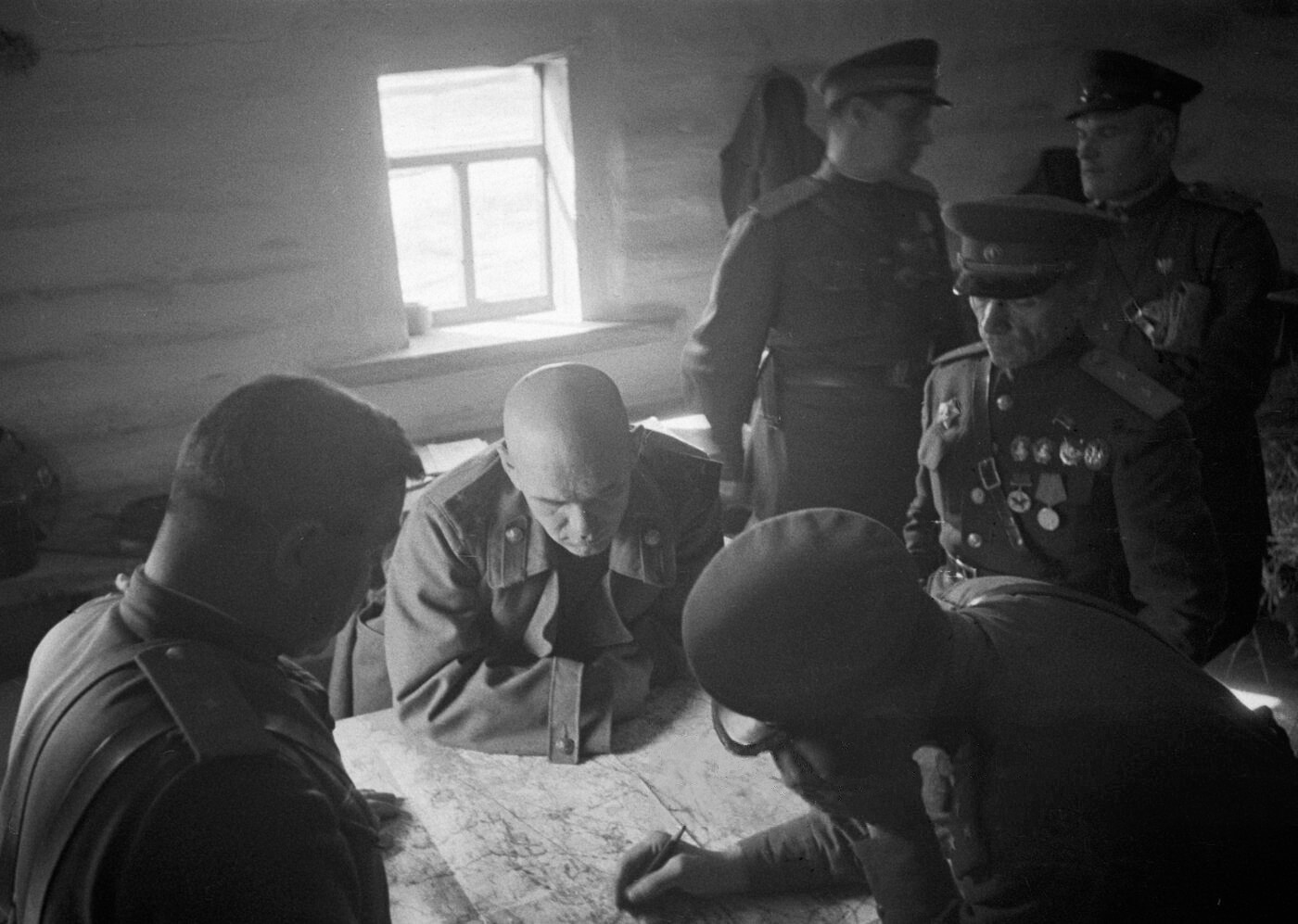
Batov (right) with officers at his command post during the Chernigov–Pripyat operation, September 1943

Following this victory 65th Army was moved to the northwest, rejoining Rokossovski as part of his new Central Front. Exploiting success, the Front was pushing hard against the weak German Second Army west of Kursk, when it was brought to a halt by the spring rasputitsa and German successes around Kharkov, to the south. In July 1943, Batov's army formed part of Rokossovski's Front during the giant Battle of Kursk, on a secondary sector, and in the exploitation operations that followed the German defeat. From August through October, the 65th Army forced crossings of the rivers Sev, Desna, Sozh, and finally the Dnieper, earning Batov and his army a formidable reputation in river-crossing operations.

Rokossovski's command was first renamed as Belorussian Front, and later as 1st Belorussian Front. In June 1944, Batov's army took part in major strategic operations in Belorussia. In a well-known confrontation at the planning stage, Rokossovski convinced Stalin that, given the terrain, it was better to strike two strong blows against the German forces than just one. He was counting on Batov's ability to lead his army across swampy regions south of Bobruisk, using corduroy roads, swamp shoes, and other means. The 65th Army did not disappoint, and within a few days the German Ninth Army was encircled and mostly destroyed. For his performance, Batov was promoted to Colonel General.

The 65th Army crossed the Bug River on July 22, and pushed on to cross the Narev River, north of Warsaw, by September 4. Operation Bagration had run out of steam, but Batov's army held off strong German counterattacks against the Narev bridgehead for more than two months. Following this, Rokossovski's command was renamed 2nd Belorussian Front, and forces were built up in the bridgehead for an offensive to be launched in January.

During the new offensive, 65th Army forced a crossing of the Vistula River in early February. Rokossovski later noted:

I had been with 65th Army since Stalingrad and had had ample opportunity to observe the splendid combat qualities of its men, commanders, and, of course, Pavel Batov, a brave and talented soldier.

The winter offensive propelled Batov's army into eastern Germany, finally to the Oder River, near Stettin-an-Oder, where it once again forced a difficult river crossing in April 1945. Officials of the city surrendered to Batov's 193rd Rifle Division on April 26.

== Following the War ==
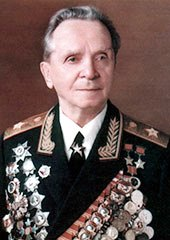
Army General Pavel Batov

After the war, Batov held various senior commands. In the summer of 1945, he was appointed to command the 7th Mechanized Army in Poland, and as force levels decreased, the 11th Guards Army, headquartered in Kaliningrad, in 1947. In 1949, he became First Deputy Commander of the Group of Soviet Forces, Germany, for a brief period before attending the Voroshilov General Staff Academy. During this time he also became a prolific writer on military theory. His treatise on river-crossing operations is still consulted to this day.

Batov became the commander of the Carpathian Military District from 1955 to 1958. In this period, he participated in the suppression of the 1956 Hungarian Revolt. He was transferred to command the Baltic Military District (1958-1959), the Southern Group of Forces (1960-1962), and finally Deputy Chief of Staff of Warsaw Pact Forces (1962-1965), replacing the deceased General A. I. Antonov. Batov resigned as an active Soviet Army officer in 1965, but continued to work in the Defense Ministry Inspectorate, and from 1970 to 1981 as Chief of the Soviet Veterans Committee. He wrote his memoirs during this time. He remained a close personal friend of Rokossovski until the latter's death in 1968, and was entrusted with the task of editing and publishing his former commander's memoirs.

Although mostly unknown to the general public, Batov had a well-deserved reputation of competence and takes place among the myriad of the talented generals who, after surviving the first part of the Soviet-Nazi war, greatly contributed to the final victory over the Nazis. He was fond of saying, "One must beat the enemy artfully, and that means with little blood." A post-war Western intelligence assessment summed him up as follows:

During World War II, Batov enjoyed much confidence and great respect from the troops because he was one of the few senior officers who went to the front lines during battles and conversed with the soldiers. He was much admired by the soldiers for this very fact. He proved himself a capable and talented military leader and teacher of troops during the war.

Batov died on April 19, 1985, in Moscow and was buried in Novodevichy Cemetery.

== Awards and honors ==
Soviet

- Hero of the Soviet Union (1943, 1945)
- Cross of St. George (twice)
- Order of Lenin (1937, 1940, 1943, 1945, 1957, 1967, 1977, 1982)
- Order of the October Revolution (1972)
- Order of the Red Banner (1937, 1944, 1949)
- Order of Suvorov 1st Class (1943, 1943, 1945)
- Order of Kutuzov 1st Class
- Order of Bogdan Khmelnitsky, 1st Class (1956)
- Order of the Patriotic War 1st Class (1985)
- Order "For Service to the Homeland in the Armed Forces of the USSR" 3rd Class (1975)
- Order of the Badge of Honor (1936)
- campaign and jubilee medals

Foreign

- Order of Polonia Restituta (Poland)
- Virtuti Militari (Poland)
- Order of the Cross of Grunwald (Poland)
- Medal "For Warsaw 1939-1945" (Poland)
- Medal "For Oder, Neisse and the Baltic" (Poland)
- Medal of Victory and Freedom 1945 (Poland)
- Order of the British Empire (United Kingdom)
- Medal of Sino-Soviet Friendship (China)
- Order of the People's Republic of Bulgaria (Bulgaria)
- Order of Sukhbaatar (Mongolia)
- Order of the Red Banner (Mongolia)
- Order of Tudor Vladimirescu 1st Class (Romania)
- Patriotic Order of Merit 1st Class (East Germany)

== Book ==
Batov, Pavel Ivanovich (2000) [1962]. В походах и боях [In Campaigns And Battles] (in Russian). Moscow: Golos. ISBN 978-5711702122.
