= Far Eastern Military District =

- Дальневосточный военный округ
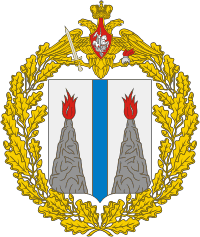
- Far Eastern Military District Coat of Arms
- Active: May 17, 1935–1938; 1945–2010
- Country: Soviet Union (1935–1991); Russia (1992–December 1, 2010)
- Branch: Soviet Armed Forces; Armed Forces of the Russian Federation
- Type: Military district
- Part of: Ministry of Defence
- Headquarters: Seryshev Street, Khabarovsk
- Decorations: Order of the Red Banner

Commanders
- Notable commanders: Vasily Blyukher; Nikolay Ivanovich Krylov; Rodion Malinovsky; Dmitri Yazov

The Far Eastern Military District (Russian: Дальневосточный военный округ; Dalʹnevostochnyĭ voennyĭ okrug) was a military district of the Armed Forces of the Russian Federation. In 2010 it was merged with the Pacific Fleet and part of the Siberian Military District to form the new Eastern Military District.

== History ==
The Far Eastern Military District traces its history originally to the Eastern Siberian Military District originally formed in 1918, during the Russian Civil War. Its headquarters were at Khabarovsk.

Following the Soviet victory in the Civil War the Soviet forces in the area became the Special Red Banner Far Eastern Army (OKDVA) of the Far Eastern Republic. The District was first briefly formed in 1935 from those forces, but then reverted to the title Special Red Banner Far Eastern Army, under Marshal of the Soviet Union Vasily Blyukher, while still functioning as a military district. The Army became the Soviet Far East Front in June 1938, after Blyukher's torture and death at the hands of the NKVD during the Great Purge.

In August 1941, the front commander, General of the Army I. R. Apanasenko was tasked to send to the west several divisions, including tank formations. Almost at the same time in October - November, the 58th Tank Division of General AA Kotljarova (1st Red Banner Army); 60th Tank Division - Major-General A. Popova; and the 112th Tank Division were all sent to the West.

The Soviet invasion of Manchuria was launched against the Japanese held region of Manchukuo, the Japanese protectorates of Inner Mongolia and Korea, and several Japanese-claimed islands from the Soviet Far East by the Far Eastern Direction, with the two Far East Fronts under its command, under Marshal Vasilevsky in the last days of the Second World War.

In 1945, the 614th Khingan Rifle Regiment of the 396th Rifle Division "Khingan" was formed at Skovorodino, Amur Oblast.

On September 10, 1945, the 1st Far East Front was disbanded by being redesignated the Primorskiy Military District, controlling the Primorye Territory, and the 2nd Far Eastern Front was redesignated the Far East Military District controlling Kamchatka, Sakhalin and the Kurile Islands. In 1947 parts of Khabarovsk Krai and the Amur Oblast, transferred from the redesignating Transbaikal-Amur Military District, were added to the Far Eastern Military District. Six years later on April 23, 1953, the two districts were reunified as the Far Eastern Military District, with its headquarters staff in Khabarovsk, the staff being drawn from the former Commander-in-Chief of Forces of the Far East's staff.

In 1966 Headquarters 29th Army Corps, formerly the 29th Rifle Corps, arrived from Krasnodar Krai, in the North Caucasus Military District. The 265th Motor Rifle Division arrived from the western end of the USSR in 1968. In mid 1969 29th Army Corps was redesignated 35th Army. Two more divisions, one a new activation (the 192nd Motor Rifle Division) were added to the new army in 1969.

There were originally a corps headquarters and three divisions of the Soviet Airborne Forces (VDV), active in the district after the war. 37th Guards Airborne Corps had the 13th, 98th, and 99th Guards Airborne Divisions, but the 99th was disbanded in 1956, the 13th disbanded in 1959 and the 98th transferred to Ukraine in 1969, leaving air assault brigades as the only Airborne Forces present. Among the air assault brigades formed was the 13th, activated 8.70 in Magdagachi, Amur Oblast, and active until 1996. The 83rd Air Assault Brigade arrived in Ussuryisk, Primorskiy Kray, in mid-1990, and was transferred from the VDV to the District in 1995.

In 1969 the staff of the 51st Combined Arms Army was formed on the basis of the staff of the 2nd Army Corps. Around 1988 the composition of the 51st Combined Arms Army of the Far Eastern Military District included:

- 33rd Motor-Rifle Red Banner Division (Khomutovo, near Yuzhno-Sakhalinsk Airport, Sakhalin Island)
- 79th Motor-Rifle Sakhalin Red Banner Division (Leonidovo)
- 18th Machine Gun Artillery Division (settlement Gor’achiy Kluch, Iturup Island, Sakhalin Oblast).

In 1969 the 43rd Army Corps moved from Petropavlovsk-Kamchatsky to Birobidzhan.

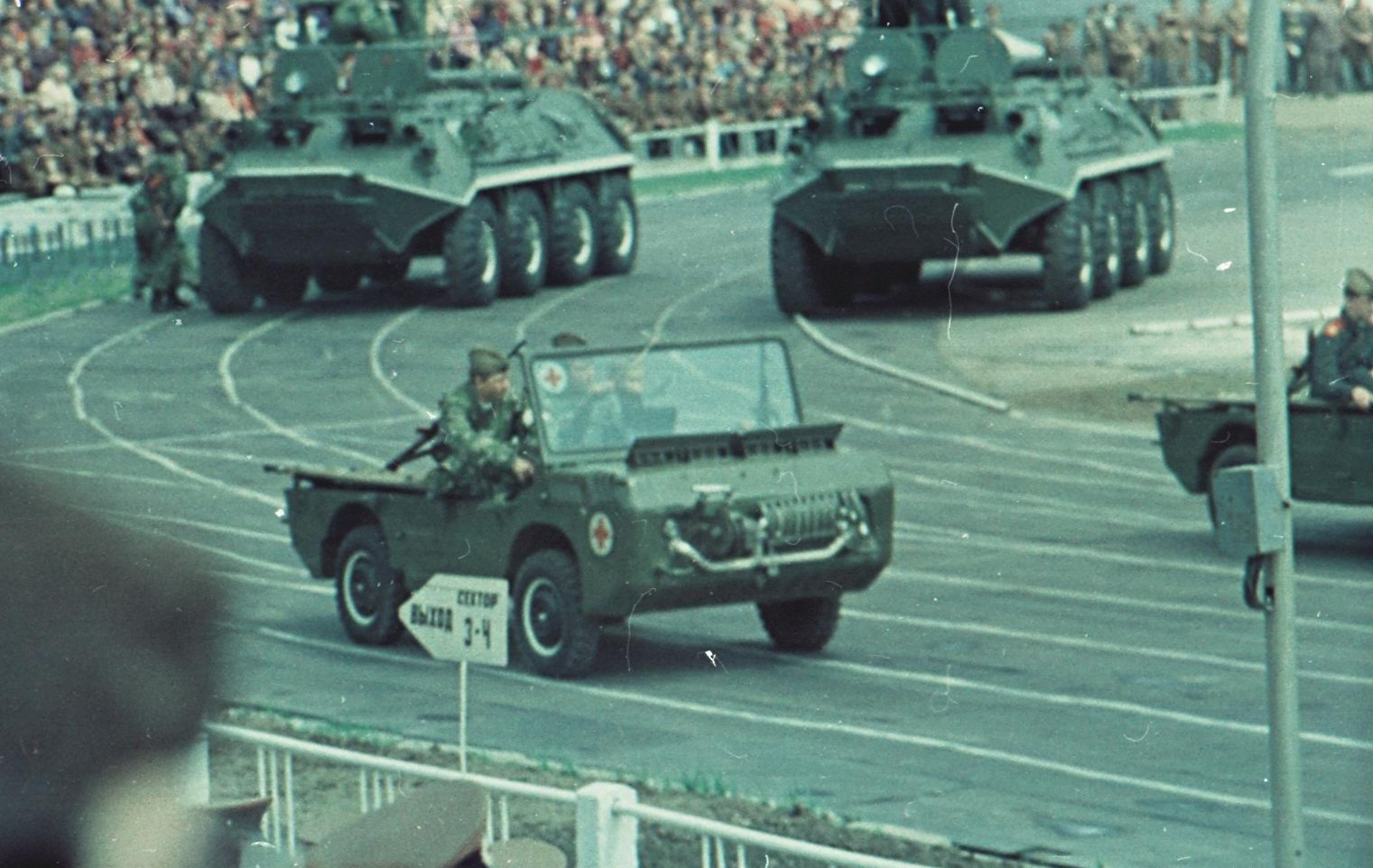
A LuAZ military vehicle in Khabarovsk.

Toward the end of the 1980s the District included the 5th Army (HQ Ussuriysk, 29th Motor Rifle Division, HQ Kamen-Rybolov, Primorskiy Kray; 40th Motor Rifle Division HQ Smolyaninovo-1, Primorskiy Kray; 123rd Guards Motor Rifle Division, Barabash, Primorskiy Kray; 199th Motor Rifle Division, HQ Krasnyy Kut, Primorskiy Kray; 277th Motor Rifle Division, HQ Sergeevka, Primorskiy Kray; 475th Territorial Training Center, HQ Shkotovo, Primorskiy Kray, a former cadre MRD; the 77th Tank Division, renamed the 1008th TTC on 1 December 1987 with its headquarters at Lyalichi, Primorsky Krai; five Fortified Regions (the 4th, 5th, 13th, 15th and 20th); the 124th (cadre) MRD, a duplicate of the 123rd Guards MRD, had been disbanded in 1987), the 15th Army (HQ Khabarovsk, with the 73rd Motor Rifle Division (HQ Komsomolsk-na-Amure, Khabarovsk Krai); the 81st Guards Motor Rifle Division, with its HQ at Bikin, Khabarovsk Krai; the 135th Motor Rifle Division (HQ Lesozavodsk, Primorskiy Krai); the 270th Motor Rifle Division, HQ Krasnaya Rechka (Khabarovsk-41), Khabarovsk Krai; the 2nd Fortified Area (Bolshoy Ussuriyskiy Island, Khabarovsk Kray) and the 17th Fortified Area (Dalnerechensk, Primorskiy Kray)); the 35th Army (HQ Belogorsk, 21 GTD; 67, 192, 265 and 266th MRDs), and the 51st Army (HQ Yuzho-Sakhalinsk, (three divisions), and the 25th Army Corps with the 87th and 99th MRDs.

Far Eastern Military District after absorption of Sakha Republic

In 1992 Colonel General Viktor Chechevatov, who had previously commanded the Kiev Military District, but refused to take the oath of allegiance to Ukraine, arrived as the new district commander. On 11 October 1993 the 51st Army became the 68th Army Corps. 25th Army Corps eventually became the headquarters of Ground and Coastal Defence Forces of the new North-Eastern Group of Troops and Forces in the Chukotka area. The District gained the vast Sakha Republic from the disbanding Transbaikal Military District following reorganisation in the late 1990s, which also saw the disbandment of the 15th and 51st Armies. After that 1998 reorganisation, forces within the District included the 14th Separate Brigade of Special Designation (Spetsnaz) at Ussuriysk, the 5th Army, the 35th Army, HQ 68th Corps (the former 51st Army), four Motor Rifle Divisions, and four Machine-Gun/Artillery Divisions. In April 2007 it was reported that ten units in the DVVO were composed by contractors.

Under naval command was the North Eastern Group of Troops and Forces (Ru: Группировки войск и сил на Северо-Востоке России (ВССВ)), formed in 1998 and incorporating troops of the former 25th Army Corps. The North-Eastern Group was established in Kamchatka in 1998 "primarily because of the remoteness of the zone of responsibility in the North-East from the controlling structures, the Far East Military District, and the Pacific Fleet". It was based on the headquarters of the Kamchatka Flotilla. It included the 40th Motor Rifle Brigade on the Kamchatka peninsula, which appeared to be at Petropavlovsk-Kamchatsky and includes the 59th Separate Tank Battalion and 385th Separate Motor Rifle Battalion. In August 2007 the 40th Brigade become a Naval Infantry brigade, and in 2009 it became the 3rd Naval Infantry Regiment.

== Commanders since 1945 ==
Name	Years served in position
Army General Maksim Purkayev	September 1945 – January 1947
Colonel General Nikolay Krylov (later Marshal of the Soviet Union)	January 1947 – April 1953
Marshal of the Soviet Union Rodion Malinovsky	April 1953 – March 1956
Army General Valentin Penkovskiy	March 1956 – July 1961
Army General Yakov Kreizer	August 1961 – December 1963
Colonel General Ivan Pavlovsky	December 1963 – April 1967
Colonel General Оleg Losik	April 5, 1967 – May 1969
Army General Vladimir Тolubko	May 1969 – April 1972
Army General Vasily Petrov	April 1972 – May 1976
Army General Ivan Tretyak	June 1976 – July 1984
Army General Dmitry Yazov	July 1984 – January 1987
Colonel General Mikhail Moiseyev	January 1987 – December 1988
Colonel General Viktor Novozhilov	January 1989 – 1992
Colonel General Viktor Chechevatov. Previously commanded the Kiev Military District, but refused to take the oath of allegiance to Ukraine	1992–1999
Colonel General (until 2003)/Army General Yury Yakubov	1999 – September 2006
Colonel General Vladimir Bulgakov	September 2006 – 2009
Colonel General Oleg Salyukov	December 2008 – 2010

== Former structure c. 2008 ==
- 5th Army
  - 17th Guards Motor Rifle Division (former 123 Guards MRD, former 129th Machine-Gun Artillery Division)
  - 81st Guards Krasnograd Motor Rifle Division (Bikin)(81 Guards Rifle Division was ex 422nd Rifle Division March 1943. Fought at Krasnograd, Iasi, and Pressburg. With 53rd Army of the 2nd Ukrainian Front 5.45. Became 81st Guards Motor Rifle Division on 4 June 1957.)
  - 121st Order of Red Banner Motor Rifle Division (originally 10th Mechanised Corps)
  - 127th Machine-Gun Artillery Division (ex 277 MRD, originally 66th Rifle Division)
  - 130th Machine Gun Artillery Division (Lesozavodsk)
- 35th Army
  - 21st Guards Motor Rifle Division
  - 128th Machine Gun Artillery Division (former 272nd Motor Rifle Division and 272nd Rifle Division)
  - 270th Motor Rifle Division
- 68th Army Corps (reported to have disbanded December 2006)
  - 18th Machine Gun Artillery Division
  - 33rd Motor Rifle Division
- 392nd District Training Center (former 39th Rifle Division, 129th Training MRD)
- 83rd Independent Airborne Brigade
- 14th Spetsnaz Brigade
- other smaller units

== Subordinate units ==
Order of the Red Star Far Eastern Military District 2010:

- Combat formations:
  - 5th Red Banner Army, in Ussuriysk
    - 57th Guards Independent Motor-Rifle Brigade "Krasnodar", in Bikin equipped with BMP
    - 59th Independent Motor-Rifle Brigade, in Sergeyevka, Primorsky Krai equipped with BMP
    - 60th Independent Motor-Rifle Brigade, in Kamen-Rybolov equipped with BMP
    - 70th Guards Independent Motor-Rifle Brigade "Dukhovshchino-Khinganskaya", in Barabash equipped with MT-LBV
    - 237th Reserve Base (89th Independent Motor-Rifle Brigade), in Bikin
    - 245th Reserve Base (93rd Independent Motor-Rifle Brigade), in Lesozavodsk
    - 247th Reserve Base (94th Independent Motor-Rifle Brigade), in Sibirtsevo
  - 35th Army, in Belogorsk
    - 38th Guards Independent Motor-Rifle Brigade, in Yekaterinoslavka equipped with BMP
    - 64th Independent Motor-Rifle Brigade, in Khabarovsk equipped with BMP
    - 69th Covering Brigade "Svir-Pomerania", in Babstovo
    - 240th Reserve Base (90th Independent Motor-Rifle Brigade), in Belogorsk
    - 243rd Reserve Base (92nd Independent Motor-Rifle Brigade), in Khabarovsk
    - 261st Reserve Base (95th Independent Motor-Rifle Brigade), in Mokhovaya Pad
  - 18th Machine Gun Artillery Division, in Goryachie Klyuchi
    - 46th Machine Gun-Artillery Regiment
    - 49th Machine Gun-Artillery Regiment
  - 14th Independent Spetsnaz Brigade, in Ussuriysk
  - 39th Independent Motor Rifle Brigade, in Khomutovo equipped with MT-LBV
  - 83rd Independent Airborne Brigade, in Ussuriysk
  - 230th Reserve Base (88th Independent Motor-Rifle Brigade), in Dachnoye
  - 392nd District Training Center, in Knyaze-Volkonskoye
- Missile and Artillery formations:
  - 20th Guards Missile Brigade "Berlin", in Spassk-Dalny
  - 107th Missile Brigade "Mozir", in Birobidzhan
  - 165th Artillery Brigade "Prague", in Nikolskoye
  - 305th Artillery Brigade, in Ussuriysk
  - 338th Guards MLRS Brigade "Nevsko-Dvinskaya", Novosisoyevka
  - 7020th Artillery Reserve Base "Kharbin", in Ussuriysk
  - 7021st Artillery Reserve Base, in Nikolskoye
- Air-defence formations:
  - 5th Army
    - 8th Air-defence Missile Brigade "Shavlinskaya" equipped with the Buk missile system
    - 641st Air-defence Command Center
  - 35th Army
    - 71st Air-defence Missile Brigade equipped with the Buk missile system
    - 643rd Air-defence Command Center
- Radar formations:
  - 76th Independent Radio Technical Brigade, in Vyatskoye
  - 94th Independent Radio Technical Battalion, in Ussuriysk (5th Army)
  - 1889th Independent Radio Technical Battalion, in Belogorsk (35th Army)
- Engineering formations:
  - 37th Engineer Regiment (35th Army)
  - 58th Engineer Regiment (5th Army)
  - 2463rd Independent Engineer Battalion, in Ussuriysk
  - 7027th Engineer Reserve Base
- NBC-defence formations:
  - 16th Independent NBC-defence Brigade, in Galkino
  - 70th Independent Flamethrower Battalion, in Razdolnoye
  - 122nd Independent NBC-defence Battalion, in Ussuriysk (5th Army)
  - 135th Independent NBC-defence Battalion, in Khabarovsk (35th Army)
- Signal formations:
  - 17th Independent Electronic Warfare Brigade
  - 104th (Communications Hub) Signal Brigade "Kluzh", in Khabarovsk
  - 106th (Territorial) Signal Brigade
  - 54th Signal Regiment (35th Army)
  - 86th Signal Regiment (5th Army)
  - 156th Independent (Rear) Signal Battalion

== See also ==
- Korean Air Lines Flight 007 for role of FEMD in the shootdown
- Anatoly Kornukov
