= Krasnaya Rechka =

Krasnaya Rechka (Russian: Кра́сная Ре́чка) is the name of several rural localities in Russia:

- Krasnaya Rechka, Republic of Karelia, a village in Kondopozhsky District of the Republic of Karelia
- Krasnaya Rechka, Kirov Oblast, a settlement in Kobrinsky Rural Okrug of Nagorsky District in Kirov Oblast; 59°51′N 51°22′E
- Krasnaya Rechka, Krasnoyarsk Krai, a village in Krasnozavodskoy Selsoviet of Bogotolsky District in Krasnoyarsk Krai
- Krasnaya Rechka, Leningrad Oblast, a village under the administrative jurisdiction of Yefimovskoye Settlement Municipal Formation in Boksitogorsky District of Leningrad Oblast; 59°25′N 34°43′E
- Krasnaya Rechka, Novotoryalsky District, Mari El Republic, a village in Chuksolinsky Rural Okrug of Novotoryalsky District in the Mari El Republic; 57°03′N 48°50′E
- Krasnaya Rechka, Orshansky District, Mari El Republic, a selo in Shulkinsky Rural Okrug of Orshansky District in the Mari El Republic; 57°04′N 48°14′E
- Krasnaya Rechka, Shakhunya, Nizhny Novgorod Oblast, a village in Tumaninsky Selsoviet under the administrative jurisdiction of the town of oblast significance of Shakhunya in Nizhny Novgorod Oblast; 57°43′N 46°46′E
- Krasnaya Rechka, Ardatovsky District, Nizhny Novgorod Oblast, a settlement in Lichadeyevsky Selsoviet of Ardatovsky District in Nizhny Novgorod Oblast; 55°24′N 43°20′E
- Krasnaya Rechka, Dergachyovsky District, Saratov Oblast, a selo in Dergachyovsky District of Saratov Oblast
- Krasnaya Rechka, Novoburassky District, Saratov Oblast, a selo in Novoburassky District of Saratov Oblast
- Krasnaya Rechka, Pugachyovsky District, Saratov Oblast, a selo in Pugachyovsky District of Saratov Oblast
- Krasnaya Rechka, Zabaykalsky Krai, a settlement in Ulyotovsky District of Zabaykalsky Krai

== See also ==
- Krasnenkaya Rechka Municipal Okrug, a municipal okrug in Kirovsky District of the federal city of St. Petersburg
