= 270th Motor Rifle Division =

Motor rifle division of the Soviet military

- Active: 1970–2010
- Country: Soviet Union; Russia
- Branch: Soviet Army; Russian Ground Forces
- Type: Motorized infantry
- Garrison/HQ: Krasnaya Rechka

The 270th Motor Rifle Division was a motorized infantry division of the Soviet Army and later the Russian Ground Forces.

== History ==
On 19 August 1967, the division was reformed in the Far East Military District, without a formal designation or barracks location, and was linked for administration purposes to the 129th Motor Rifle Division. The division's Military Unit Number (Войсковая часть) was 61304.

On 3 March 1970, the 270th Motor Rifle Division was formally re-formed, based in the city of Khabarovsk. The division was a part of 15th Army (Combined Arms) of the Far East Military District.

The division was based at Krasnaya Rechka, near Khabarovsk from its formation and was part of the 15th Army. It comprised the 509th Tank Regiment, and the 871nd, 478th, and 882nd Motor Rifle Regiments, as well as the 470th Anti-Aircraft Rocket Regiment. In 2010, the division became the 243rd Weapons and Equipment Storage Base.

== Bibliography ==
=== References ===
- Feskov, V.I.; Golikov, V.I.; Kalashnikov, K.A.; Slugin, S.A. (2013). Вооруженные силы СССР после Второй Мировой войны: от Красной Армии к Советской [The Armed Forces of the USSR after World War II: From the Red Army to the Soviet: Part 1 Land Forces] (in Russian). Tomsk: Scientific and Technical Literature Publishing. ISBN 9785895035306.
