= 121st Motor Rifle Division =

Motor rifle division of the Soviet military

121st Training Motor Rifle Division (1970–1987) 291st District Training Center (1987–1989) 121st Motor Rifle Division (1989 – c. 2009)
- Active: 1970–2009?
- Country: Soviet Union (1970–1991); Russia (1992–2009?)
- Branch: Soviet Army (1970–1991); Russian Ground Forces (1992–2009?)
- Type: Motorized infantry
- Garrison/HQ: Monastyrishche

The 121st Motor Rifle Division was a Russian Ground Forces motorized infantry division, based in Monastyrishche. It was formed in 1970 as a training motor rifle division and became a district training center in 1987. The training center became the 121st Motor Rifle Division in 1989. It appears to have disbanded in 2009, as it is not shown on orders of battle of the Eastern Military District.

== History ==
The 121st Training Motor Rifle Division was activated in August 1970 in Monastyrische, Primorsky Krai. It was part of the Far Eastern Military District. During the Cold War, it was maintained at 20-25% strength. On 14 September 1987, it became the 291st District Training Center. The training center became the 121st Motor Rifle Division on 1 October 1989. The Separate Training Motor Transport Battalion became the 1141st Separate Material Supply Battalion. In 1992, the 1040th Antiaircraft Artillery Regiment was replaced by the 1062nd Antiaircraft Missile Regiment.

== Composition ==
The 121st Training Motor Rifle Division included the following units.

- 476th Training Motorized Rifle Regiment (Monastyrishche, Primorskiy Kray)
- 494th Training Motorized Rifle Regiment (Lyalichi, Primorskiy Kray)
- 656th Training Motorized Rifle Regiment (Lyalichi, Primorskiy Kray)
- 136th Training Tank Regiment (Baranovskiy, Primorskiy Kray)
- 1220th Training Artillery Regiment (Lyalichi, Primorskiy Kray)
- 1040th Training Anti-Aircraft Artillery Regiment (Lyalichi, Primorskiy Kray)
- 127th Separate Training Missile Battalion (Monastyrishche, Primorskiy Kray)
- 1021st Separate Training Anti-Tank Artillery (Lyalichi, Primorskiy Kray)
- 1379th Separate Training Reconnaissance Battalion (Monastyrishche, Primorskiy Kray)
- 456th Separate Training Engineer-Sapper Battalion (Monastyrishche, Primorskiy Kray)
- 162nd Separate Training Communications Battalion (Monastyrishche, Primorskiy Kray)
- 138th Separate Training Chemical Defence Battalion (Monastyrishche, Primorskiy Kray)
- 453rd Separate Training Equipment Maintenance and Recovery Battalion (Monastyrishche, Primorskiy Kray)
- 147th Separate Training Medical Battalion (Monastyrishche, Primorskiy Kray)
- Separate Training Motor Transport Battalion (Monastyrishche, Primorskiy Kray)
