= 346th Rifle Division =

346th Rifle Division (August 20, 1941 – May 29, 1945)
- Late-war photo of Maj. Gen. I. E. Davidovskii
- Active: 1941–1945
- Country: Soviet Union
- Branch: Red Army
- Type: Division
- Role: Infantry
- Engagements: Battle of Moscow; Operation Uranus; Operation Little Saturn; Donbass Strategic Offensive (August 1943); Crimean Offensive; Baltic Offensive; Šiauliai Offensive; Riga Offensive (1944); Vistula-Oder Offensive
- Decorations: Order of the Red Banner
- Battle honours: Debaltsevo

Commanders
- Notable commanders: Maj. Gen. Ivan Elizarovich Davidovskii; Col. Maksim Andreevich Sushchenko; Maj. Gen. Dmitrii Ivanovich Stankevskii; Maj. Gen. Nikolai Mikhailovich Mishchenko; Maj. Gen. Vladimir Konstantinovich Gorbachev

The 346th Rifle Division began forming in late August, 1941, as a standard Red Army rifle division, in the Volga Military District. It was assigned to the 61st Army while both it and its Army continued to form up before moving to the front lines in December to take part in the winter counteroffensive south of Moscow. In September, 1942, it became part of the 5th Tank Army, and joined the offensive that encircled German Sixth Army at Stalingrad during Operation Uranus. During 1943 and early 1944 it continued to serve in the southern part of the front, taking part in the liberation of Crimea, before being transferred to the Baltic States region, serving in Latvia and Lithuania until February, 1945, when it was once again reassigned, this time to be part of the follow-on forces in the conquest of eastern Germany. The division ended the war with a distinguished service record, but was disbanded shortly after the German surrender.

== Formation ==
The division officially formed on August 20, 1941, at Volsk in the Volga Military District. Its primary order of battle was as follows:

- 1164th Rifle Regiment
- 1166th Rifle Regiment
- 1168th Rifle Regiment
- 915th Artillery Regiment

Komdiv Ivan Elizarovich Davidovskii was assigned to command of the division on the day it began forming, and he continued in command until June 6, 1942; his rank was "modernized" as Major General on May 13 of that year. As of November 1, the division was still unassigned in the Volga Military District, but by one month later it had been assigned to the new 61st Army in the Reserve of the Supreme High Command.

=== Battle of Moscow ===
In the first days of December 61st Army was assigned to Bryansk Front. When the counteroffensive south of the capital began on December 7, the 346th was on its Army's right flank south of Skopino. Over the following six weeks it advanced well to the west, until by January 20, 1942, it had reached a line from Marovka to Veino near or along the Oka River. However the offensive on this sector had by now run out of steam, and the division was now fighting defensively on this line. Over the next 10 days it renewed its activity and on the night of January 29–30 was fighting for the villages of Serdichi and Sigolaevo against stubborn German resistance, but this was as much as it could do. The 346th remained in 61st Army until September, 1942, serving under command of either Bryansk or Western Front in the area between Tula and Kursk. On June 7, the division came under the command of Col. Maksim Andreevich Sushchenko.

=== Operation Uranus ===
In the same month, the 346th was transferred to the 5th Tank Army, which was being formed for the second time in the reserves of Bryansk Front. At this stage of the war, Soviet tank armies usually included one or more rifle divisions. On September 26, Col. A. I. Tolstov took command of the division. By November 1, 5th Tank Army was assigned to Southwestern Front and formed its main mobile force.

In the first days of Operation Uranus, the offensive that would encircle the German forces at Stalingrad, the division was mostly held in reserve, in the Kalmykovskii region to protect the Army's rear west of Raspopinskaia. One rifle regiment attempted to advance alongside 50th Guards Rifle Division on its Army's east flank astride the Tsaritsa River valley on November 19, but they were halted by the firm defenses of the Romanian 5th and 6th Infantry Divisions. Despite this, much of the rest of Romanian Third Army was crumbling under the weight of the Soviet assault, and the next day its remnants were redesignated as Group Lascar. At 2000 hrs on the 21st, elements of 5th Tank and 21st Army completed the encirclement of Group Lascar, with the one regiment of the 346th holding a sector on the northeast side of the ring. On the 22nd, the regiment guarded the left flank of the 119th Rifle Division as the liquidation of the surrounded Romanians continued; by the end of the day the pocket had been chopped in two.

While this was occurring to the rear, the continued advance of 5th Tank Army was being impeded by resistance from remnants of 22nd Panzer Division north of the Kurtlak River, as well as elements of the tattered Romanian 1st Armored Division in the same area. On the 23rd, the bulk of the 346th was released from reserve and directed south against the Axis tank forces, along with 55th Cavalry Division, reinforced by 8th Guards Tank Brigade from another sector. However, according to the General Staff, the afternoon attack failed due to:

"...inadequate time to prepare the attack, poor reconnaissance of the enemy's defenses, inadequate artillery support, and the piecemeal commitment of [the] tank brigade's battalions into combat."

This failure permitted 22nd Panzer to withdraw southward into the Kurtlak River valley, relatively intact, but still partly encircled by two Soviet cavalry divisions. Col. Tolstov was also personally reprimanded for his division's poor performance, and this was likely a factor in his removal from command several days later. The following day, the 346th, supported by 8th Guards and 216th Tank Brigades and 8th Motorcycle Regiment, assaulted the panzer division's positions at Bolshaia Donshchinka from three directions at 0700 hrs. According to Romanian sources, 22nd Panzer withdrew its antitank guns from the village shortly before that time, leaving the 3,500 infantry of Romanian Group Sion, which had escaped from the encirclement of Group Lascar, to fend for itself. Group Sion was soon pocketed again; Colonel Sion was killed in a breakout attempt, and only about 800 men managed to escape to the new German lines. Overnight, the remnants of the two Axis armored divisions managed to reach the west bank of the Chir River at Rusakov.

Through the rest of the month 5th Tank Army would spar along the Chir River line with scratch forces of Romanian and German rear-area security troops plus the arriving elements of Army Detachment Hollidt. On the 25th, the 346th received orders to leave its second-echelon regiment and reserves in the Medvezhyi and Malaia Donshchinka regions and march southward to Petrovo and Kalach Kurtlak in the Kurtlak River valley. There, it was to relieve 47th Guards Rifle Division's regiments at and south of Chernyshevskaia and assist and then relieve 112th Cavalry Division in its bridgehead west of Osinovskii. The following day, the cavalry expanded its bridgehead and there was a chance that Chernyshevskaia could be enveloped if 50th Guards could arrive to the north and the 346th arrive to the south of the village quickly enough. In the event, no envelopment took place, but the 50th captured the village from 22nd Panzer in a frontal attack, while the 346th made gains to the south on November 27, although the village was lost again the same day. It appears that the division's full forces did not advance all the way to the river, which may have been due to the command changing hands.

On November 29, Maj. Gen. Dmitrii Ivanovich Stankevskii took command of the division. He would remain in command, apart from one week as acting commander of 58th Rifle Corps, until nearly the end of 1944. The division took over the bridgehead at Varlamov from 122nd Cavalry, while four to five companies of one regiment seized another bridgehead at Siniapkin, 11 km to the south, but this was soon contained. Romanian 1st Armored, at 30 percent strength, moved to block the Varlamov bridgehead, joining the 2nd Battalion of the German 403rd Security Division's 354th Grenadier Regiment. This led the commander of 5th Tank Army, Lt. Gen. P. L. Romanenko, to reinforce the position with the remaining tanks of 8th Guards and 216th Tank Brigades, along with two regiments of 47th Guards Division, as he sensed this sector offered the best prospects for a breakout across the Chir. In fighting from November 29 through to December 1, the several Soviet bridgeheads were consolidated, but no breakthrough occurred. At this time, the division likely numbered fewer than 6,000 men.

=== Operation Little Saturn ===
In the first weeks of December the division persisted in minor assaults along the same lines; some of these efforts were diversionary in nature to keep enemy forces tied down away from more critical sectors. In the planning for Operation Little Saturn, 5th Tank and 5th Shock Armies were to cooperate to smash the defenses of XXXXVIII Panzer Corps along the lower Chir and Don Rivers, then advance westward to seize the towns of Tormosin and Morozovsk and link up with the advancing 3rd Guards Army, encircling the German Corps Mieth.

As a preliminary to the main offensive, on December 24 the 346th began forcing a new crossing of the upper Chir at Georgievskii. When the main attack began three days later the division, backed by armor, began pursuing elements of Group Hollidt's XVII Army Corps (what remained of 22nd Panzer, 294th German Infantry and 1st Romanian Armored Divisions) southwest towards the Zherebets region. However, Chernyshkovskii remained in German hands. The failure of 5th Tank Army's attack to progress past the first day led to Gen. Romanenko being replaced by Lt. Gen. M.M. Popov on December 28.

In February, 1943, during the fighting around Kharkov, the 346th was transferred to the 14th Rifle Corps in 3rd Guards Army. On February 21, the following was included as part of a report to the STAVKA from Southwestern Front headquarters:

"The 14th Rifle Corps (the 259th Rifle Division, the 50th Guards Rifle Division, and the 346th Rifle Division) conducted prolonged offensive fighting and, after destroying up to two companies of enemy infantry, advanced and captured Khartsizskaia, Karakash Shakhtaia, and Piatikhatka."

In April the division was transferred again, this time to 51st Army in Southern Front, where it would remain until May, 1944, when the liberation of the Crimea was completed.

=== Donbass and Crimean Offensives ===
On September 3, 1943, the division was recognized for its role in the liberation of the Ukrainian city of Debaltsevo, and received its name as an honorific:

"DEBALTSEVO - ...346th Rifle Division (Major General Stankevskii, Dmitrii Ivanovich)... By order of the Supreme High Command of 8 September 1943 and a commendation in Moscow, the troops who participated in the battles for the liberation of Debaltsevo are given a salute of 20 artillery salvoes from 224 guns."

In late October, elements of the newly renamed 4th Ukrainian Front reached the three traditional entrances to the Crimea: the Perekop Isthmus, the Chongar Narrows and the Arabat Spit. The German and Romanian forces of German 17th Army scrambled to cover these gateways, and were able to block further Soviet advances. However, in doing so they left the south shore of the Sivash unprotected. Lt. Col. P.E. Kuznetsov, chief of intelligence of 10th Rifle Corps, was tasked by his superiors to find usable fords across the shallow sea. Kuznetsov took a scouting party of 30 men, and had the good fortune to find a local fisherman who identified a crossing site from the mainland to Cape Dzhangar. Three of the scouts crossed the 2 km-wide stretch of water, which was only ankle-deep. The next morning, November 1, the entire party made its way over, and then signaled to the Corps to begin crossing. Major P.F. Kaymakova led his battalion of the 1168th Rifle Regiment over first, with the rest of the 346th crossing soon after, followed by the 216th and 257th Rifle Divisions. A few heavy weapons, including some 45mm antitank guns, were brought over on shallow-draft pontoons, but mostly the men were limited to what they could carry. There were no Axis troops within 5 km of the crossing site, and although it was mostly carried out in broad daylight, it was hours before the enemy was aware of the crossing. Before they could react the bridgehead was expanded to a size they could only hope to contain, but without tanks or heavy weapons 10th Corps could not break through the screening forces rushed in by 17th Army. A pontoon bridge was not completed until December 9, by which time the Axis line had been reinforced by the German 336th Infantry Division. The position remained in a stalemate until April, 1944. In recognition of its success in the Perekop and Sivash operations the 346th was awarded the Order of the Red Banner on April 24.

== Into Germany ==
Following the liberation of the Crimea in early May, 4th Ukrainian Front found itself in a strategic dead-end. In a major redeployment, 2nd Guards and 51st Armies were shifted to the Reserve of the Supreme High Command, and were then railed northwards in anticipation of the coming summer offensives. When the 346th returned to the front in 1st Baltic Front in July it was in 54th Rifle Corps of the 2nd Guards Army. As of August 6, the division was organized on a much-reduced establishment, in common with many other rifle divisions at this time. Its infantry units were organized as follows:

- 1164th and 1168th Rifle Regiments, each:
  - 3 rifle battalions, each with 3 rifle companies,
    - each with 2 rifle platoons
- 1166th Rifle Regiment:
  - 2 rifle battalions, each with 3 rifle companies,
    - each with 3 rifle platoons.

At around this date, the 346th was well into the "Baltic Gap" between German army groups North and what remained of Centre, and was fighting in the vicinity of Radviliškis in Lithuania. By the middle of September the division was back in 51st Army and had entered Latvia in the area around Eleja. On December 30, General Stankevskii was replaced as commander by Maj. Gen. Nikolai Mikhailovich Mishchenko; Mishchenko was in turn reassigned to the 267th Rifle Division on February 13, 1945, and Col. K. F. Shein took over. The division remained at the front in the vicinity of Tukums until that month, when it was briefly moved to the reserves of 2nd Baltic Front, then into reserve under the control of the new Belorussian-Litovsk (Lithuanian) Military District in March. On March 20, the division received Maj. Gen. Vladimir Konstantinovich Gorbachev as its final commanding officer.

== Postwar ==
The 346th ended the war back in 14th Rifle Corps in the reserves of 2nd Belorussian Front in northeastern Germany with the full title of 346th Rifle, Debaltsevo, Order of the Red Banner Division (Russian: 346-я стрелковая Дебальцевская Краснознамённая дивизия). Under the terms of STAVKA Order No. 11095 of May 29, the division was one of those selected to be "disbanded in place" in Germany. It was disbanded in accordance with the directive during the summer of 1945.
