= Khomutovo =

Khomutovo (Russian: Хомутово) is the name of several inhabited localities in Russia.

Urban localities

- Khomutovo, Novoderevenkovsky District, Oryol Oblast, an urban-type settlement in Novoderevenkovsky District of Oryol Oblast

Rural localities

- Khomutovo, Irkutsk Oblast, a selo in Irkutsky District of Irkutsk Oblast
- Khomutovo, Ivanovo Oblast, a village in Teykovsky District of Ivanovo Oblast
- Khomutovo, Nerekhtsky District, Kostroma Oblast, a village in Volzhskoye Settlement of Nerekhtsky District of Kostroma Oblast
- Khomutovo, Ostrovsky District, Kostroma Oblast, a selo in Klevantsovskoye Settlement of Ostrovsky District of Kostroma Oblast
- Khomutovo, Krasnoyarsk Krai, a village in Tumakovsky Selsoviet of Irbeysky District of Krasnoyarsk Krai
- Khomutovo, Moscow Oblast, a village in Aksinyinskoye Rural Settlement of Stupinsky District of Moscow Oblast
- Khomutovo, Nizhny Novgorod Oblast, a village in Khakhalsky Selsoviet of the town of oblast significance of Semyonov in Nizhny Novgorod Oblast
- Khomutovo, Mtsensky District, Oryol Oblast, a village in Anikanovsky Selsoviet of Mtsensky District of Oryol Oblast
- Khomutovo, Pskov Oblast, a village in Pskovsky District of Pskov Oblast
- Khomutovo, Kalininsky District, Tver Oblast, a village in Kalininsky District of Tver Oblast
- Khomutovo, Rzhevsky District, Tver Oblast, a village in Rzhevsky District of Tver Oblast
- Khomutovo, Vologda Oblast, a village in Kharovsky Selsoviet of Kharovsky District of Vologda Oblast
- Khomutovo, Uglichsky District, Yaroslavl Oblast, a village in Ploskinsky Rural Okrug of Uglichsky District of Yaroslavl Oblast
- Khomutovo, Yaroslavsky District, Yaroslavl Oblast, a village in Teleginsky Rural Okrug of Yaroslavsky District of Yaroslavl Oblast

Airport

- Yuzhno-Sakhalinsk Airport in Sakhalin is also called Khomutovo
