= 342nd Rifle Division =

- Active: 1941–1943; 1944-1955
- Country: Soviet Union
- Branch: Red Army
- Type: Infantry
- Size: Division
- Engagements: Battle of Moscow; Operation Kutuzov; Battle of Smolensk (1943); Soviet invasion of Manchuria; Proposed Soviet invasion of Hokkaido
- Battle honours: Mtsensk

Commanders
- Notable commanders: Col. Aleksandr Ippolitovich Popov; Col. Grigorii Ivanovich Kanachadze; Maj. Gen. Logvin Chervoniy; Col. Georgii Lukyanovich Sirikh; Maj. Gen. Anatolii Olegovich Muratov

The 342nd Rifle Division began forming in September 1941, as a standard Red Army rifle division, in the Saratov oblast. It arrived at the front southwest of Moscow in December, in time to take part in the winter counteroffensive. During most of 1942 and into 1943 the division served in primarily defensive roles in 61st Army along the northern face of the German-held salient around Oryol. Following the Soviet victory at Kursk the 342nd took part in the operation that eliminated that salient, and then in the further offensives that liberated Bryansk and pushed on towards Smolensk and the Dniepr River. During these tactical-level actions the division distinguished itself sufficiently to be re-designated as the 121st Guards Rifle Division, one of the last Guards divisions to be formed before the postwar period. In November 1944, a new 342nd was formed in the Far East, and saw action against Japanese forces in northern Manchuria, assaulting across the Sungach river during the Soviet invasion of that region. Well after the war this formation was re-designated and became the 33rd Motor Rifle Division.

== 1st Formation ==
The division formed for the first time on September 9, 1941, in the Saratov area of Volga Military District. Its basic order of battle was as follows:

- 1146th Rifle Regiment
- 1148th Rifle Regiment
- 1150th Rifle Regiment
- 912th Artillery Regiment

Lt. Col. Aleksandr Ippolitovich Popov took command of the division on the day it was formed; on November 28 he was promoted to colonel, and he remained in command until November 9, 1942.

=== Battle of Moscow ===
After two months of forming up and training, in November the 342nd was assigned to the new 61st Army, which was also forming up in the Reserve of the Supreme High Command before being assigned to Southwestern Front. Colonel Popov was replaced in command by Col. Grigorii Ivanovich Kanachadze, who would lead the division through the winter battles and well into 1943. As the Soviet forces advanced westward in December the 324th, which had moved to Bryansk Front, was on the right flank of its Army, linking with 10th Army of Western Front. By 1200 hrs. on December 26 the division was engaged in fighting remnants of the German 112th Infantry Division along the line Belyi Kolodez - Chermoshny, arriving at a line south of Arsenyevo by the end of the day with the remaining divisions of 61st Army echeloned to its rear. In late January 1942, the 342nd found itself holding against German counterattacks in the fighting around Belyov, holding the line Veino - Dolbino - Fatyanovo south of that town on January 20. Over the next 10 days 61st Army concentrated its efforts against the enemy's Bolkhov group, and on the last day of the month the division remained in a fire battle along the same line, but the momentum of the winter counteroffensive was spent.

=== Operations in 1942 - 1943 ===
During the winter advance the division reached positions roughly along the Oka River, and it would remain fighting along the line of this river until the summer of 1943, mostly with 61st Army, which was assigned either on the southern flank of Western Front or the northern flank of Bryansk Front throughout this period.

Following the Soviet victory at Stalingrad, Bryansk Front joined in the general winter offensive along the southern half of the front, in its case against positions held by elements of German Second Panzer Army. On February 12, 61st Army launched a dawn attack with 12th Guards, 342nd and 356th Rifle Divisions, backed by the 68th Tank Brigade, against the defenses of the 112th Infantry Division north of Bolkhov, but within hours the assault faltered in the face of withering German fire. The Army's commander, Lt. Gen. Pavel Belov, ascribed the setback to insufficient ammunition and blowing snow which hindered the fire of the tanks. A further effort was made on this sector beginning on February 22, with the main attack being made by Western Front's 16th Army, supported by 61st and 3rd Armies. The intention was to collapse the German-held salient around Oryol in concert with attacks from the south by 13th and 48th Armies. Once again, the 12th Guards and 68th Tanks were sent in against 112th Infantry, and were repelled with serious losses for the guardsmen. Acknowledging defeat on this sector, Bryansk Front commander Col. Gen. M.A. Reiter ordered the 342nd, plus the 356th and 12th Guards, to be transferred to 3rd Army, where they were to reinforce that Army's bridgehead on the west bank of the Oka. This reinforcement helped to contain the numerous German counterattacks against this bridgehead between February 27 and March 1, but continued pressure finally forced 3rd Army to abandon the bridgehead by March 12, and the division reverted to 61st Army.

On May 11, Col. Logvin Danilovich Chervony took command of the division from Colonel Kanachadze; the former would be promoted to Major General on September 1 and would later be named a Hero of the Soviet Union. Following the German defeat at Kursk, the 342nd was finally able to advance into the Oryol salient, and on July 20 was awarded one of the first honorifics for the liberation of an occupied place, in this case, Mtsensk. During August it took part in the Soviet summer offensive that liberated Bryansk and drove to the Dniepr River between Bobruisk and Mogilev. Although these attacks never resulted in an actual breakthrough and were accompanied with disproportionate Soviet casualties, the division was noted for its successes in tactical-level operations in the late summer, and on September 23 was re-designated as the 121st Guards Rifle Division in the 80th Rifle Corps of the 3rd Army in the Bryansk Front.

== 2nd Formation ==
On November 22, 1944, the 342nd was formed again, this time in the 2nd Red Banner Army of the Far Eastern Front. Its basic order of battle remained the same as the 1st formation. It first came under the command of Col. Georgii Lukyanovich Sirikh, but this officer was succeeded by Maj. Gen. Anatolii Olegovich Muratov on July 29, 1945. The division fought as part of 87th Rifle Corps during the Soviet invasion of Manchuria, and was slated to participate in the proposed Soviet invasion of Hokkaido before it was cancelled. Its history can be found under its successor formation, the 33rd Motor Rifle Division.
