= Viktor Novozhilov (general) =

Russian military commander

- Виктор Иванович Новожилов
- Born: Viktor Ivanovich Novozhilov; 21 September 1939 (age 87); Darino, Russian SFSR, Soviet Union
- Military career
- Allegiance: Soviet Union; Russia
- Branch: Russian Ground Forces
- Rank: Colonel general
- Commands: 51st Combined Arms Army (1984-1987); Far Eastern Military District (1989-1992); Vystrel course (1992-1998)
- Awards: Order of the Red Banner; Order "For Service to the Homeland in the Armed Forces of the USSR" Third Class

Viktor Ivanovich Novozhilov (Russian: Виктор Иванович Новожилов; born 21 September 1939), is a retired officer of the Soviet and later Russian Army, who commanded the Far Eastern Military District between 1989 and 1992, reaching the rank of colonel general.

== Biography ==
Viktor Novozhilov was born on 21 September 1939. He attended the 1st Guards Ulyanovsk Tank School named after V. I. Lenin between 1959 and 1962. His later education was at the Malinovsky Military Armored Forces Academy, and the Voroshilov Military Academy of the General Staff.

Novozhilov served as commander of a platoon, company, battalion, tank regiment, chief of staff of a tank division, commander of a motorized rifle division, 1st deputy commander and commander of the 51st Combined Arms Army from September 1984 to January 1987. From October 1987 - January 1989, he was the 1st deputy commander of Far Eastern Military District. In January 1989, he became the commander of the Far Eastern Military district, holding the position after the dissolution of the Soviet Union in 1991. On 22 March 1989, he was promoted to lieutenant general, and on 21 July 1990, to colonel general. He left the post on 28 April 1992, where he became the head of the 1st Central Higher Officer Courses named after Marshal of the Soviet Union B. M. Shaposhnikov until 1998.

Novozhilov was awarded the Order of the Red Banner and Order "For Service to the Homeland in the Armed Forces of the USSR" third class.

== Removal from post ==
“The removal of Novozhilov from the post of commander of the Far Eastern Military District caused ferment among the employees of the control and inspection group of the Far Eastern Military District for special activities (nuclear weapons control). According to the inspectors, Novozhilov was "the last honest general in the district, for which he suffered." His current position - the head of the officers' courses "Shot" - they regard as a cruel disgrace".

“The investigation established that Igor Neklyudov, the general director of DalREO, using the long-standing acquaintance of Nikolay Danilyuk (former chairman of the Khabarovsk Regional Council of People's Deputies) with the commander of the Far Eastern Military District, Viktor Novozhilov, received dozens of units of military equipment at a residual, minimal cost. The building of the military university and the dacha complex of the Military Council of the Far Eastern Military District — the dacha of V.K. DalREO got the complex for only 4.8 million rubles, and its real cost is several dozen times higher than this figure.”

“It is also interesting that a number of lawsuits took place in Khabarovsk against some civil servants who, using their posts, were engaged in illegal commercial activities. In one of the cases, in particular, the head of the tax inspectorate, Ivan Evdokimov, was also involved. He, together with the former chairman of the regional Council of People's Deputies, People's Deputy of the USSR Nikolai Danilyuk and the commander of the district, Colonel-General Viktor Novozhilov, organized the commercial structure "Conversion-1" and became its co-owner. "Conversion" through the firm "Hermes" (its founder was the People's Deputy of the USSR Vasily Kotik) was engaged in the illegal sale of military equipment to other firms.

“We were given a real trial in the Khabarovsk courts. It would be for that - killed! And all because we dared to “stroke” the plenipotentiary in the Far Eastern Federal District, Viktor Ivanovich Ishayev, against wool. For two years, we still have not come out of litigation. And there's no point in trying to prove anything."source=—Statement of journalist of the Khabarovsk Express newspaper Irina Kharitonova.

The court must refute that the former commander of the Far Eastern Military District, General Viktor Novozhilov, lives on Rublevskoye Highway, moreover, all summonses to Novozhilov were sent to Rublevskoye Highway, and in the lawsuit itself he had a return address - Rublevskoye Highway. The judge shrugged at this: “What can I do, the plaintiff demands to refute this (place of residence - Rublevskoye Highway)!”

The journalists of the Khabarovsk Express newspaper were ordered to pay 210,000 rubles for moral damages, in particular, 20,000 rubles from each of the two journalists (40,000 rubles in total) to Novozhilov.

Russian human rights activist and veteran dissident Vladimir Shaklein, in 2012, upon his arrival in Khabarovsk, met with journalists and saw signs of "ordered" court decisions. Journalists appealed to the European Court of Human Rights, filing complaints. On 7 December 2021, the court found a violation of Article 10 of the European Convention on Human Rights related to freedom of expression.
