= 121st Guards Rifle Division =

- Active: 1943–1946
- Country: Soviet Union
- Branch: Red Army
- Type: Division
- Role: Infantry
- Engagements: Battle of Smolensk (1943); Gomel-Rechitsa Offensive; Kamenets-Podolsky pocket Lvov–Sandomierz Offensive; Vistula-Oder Offensive; Silesian Offensives; Battle of Berlin; Prague Offensive
- Decorations: Order of Lenin; Order of the Red Banner; Order of Suvorov
- Battle honours: Gomel

Commanders
- Notable commanders: Maj. Gen. Logvin Chervoniy

The 121st Guards Rifle Division was formed on September 23, 1943, based on the first formation of the 342nd Rifle Division, in the 80th Rifle Corps of 3rd Army. During 1943 it shared a similar combat path to that of the 120th Guards Rifle Division, which was formed in the same Army about a week later. On November 26 it was given credit for its role in the liberation of Gomel and won that city's name as an honorific. It was soon reassigned to 13th Army and would serve under that command for the rest of the war. In 1944 the division helped form the bridgehead over the Vistula at Sandomir, and in January, 1945, joined in the breakout from this bridgehead and the subsequent advance through Poland and into Germany, earning its final honor for the capture of Wittenberg. The 121st Guards ended the war in western Czechoslovakia with a very impressive combat record.

== Formation ==
The 342nd Rifle Division was raised to Guards status as the 121st Guards on September 23, 1943, based on its successful actions and mass heroism during Operation Kutuzov, the offensive that eliminated the German-held salient around Oryol. Its order of battle was as follows:

- 337th Guards Rifle Regiment from 1146th Rifle Regiment
- 340th Guards Rifle Regiment from 1148th Rifle Regiment
- 342nd Guards Rifle Regiment from 1150th Rifle Regiment
- 313th Guards Artillery Regiment from 912th Artillery Regiment
- 120th Guards Antitank Battalion
- 127th Guards Sapper Battalion
- 161st Guards Signal Battalion
- 117th Guards Reconnaissance Company

The division was under the command of Maj. Gen. Logvin Davidovich Chervonii, and he would remain in command for the duration of the war.

== Advance ==
As of October 1, the 121st Guards was in 80th Rifle Corps of 3rd Army, which had recently been reassigned to Central Front from Bryansk Front. During the Gomel-Rechitsa Offensive, which began on September 30, the division was tasked, along with 120th Guards and 269th Rifle Divisions, with seizing a bridgehead over the Sozh River to divert German attention and reserves from the fighting in the Gomel region. The attack began at dawn on October 12 and succeeded in capturing small bridgeheads 1–2 km deep at Kostiukovka, Salabuty and Studenets, all south of the city of Propoisk. Although German counterattacks over the next few days prevented the attackers from enlarging their bridgeheads, the attack also prevented German 9th Army from sending reinforcements to 2nd Army to the south.

The responsibility for the final liberation of Gomel was assigned to 11th and 48th Armies. The 11th struck on November 12 but encountered extremely stiff resistance. The fight for the city was long and bloody, but Soviet advances on the flanks made the German position untenable. Meanwhile, 121st Guards was en route from 3rd to 13th Army and was drawn in to the fighting for the city. Gomel was finally liberated on November 26, and the 121st Guards was one of several units recognized with the city's name as an honorific:

"GOMEL" - ...121st Guards Rifle Division (Major General Chervonii, Logvin Danilovich)... the troops who participated in the liberation of Gomel, by the order of the Supreme High Command of 26 November 1943, and a commendation in Moscow, are given a salute of 20 artillery salvos from 224 guns.

In December the division would part ways from its "sister" 120th Guards by being transferred to 13th Army, which was now in 1st Ukrainian Front. It would remain under those commands for the duration, to begin with in 76th Rifle Corps. In mid-1944 the division took part in the Lvov-Sandomir Operation, and in January, 1945, it helped make the breakthrough that unleashed the 3rd Guards and 4th Tank Armies to race across Poland and into Germany from the Sandomir bridgehead. Before the Berlin Operation began the 121st was moved to the 24th Rifle Corps. At this time the strength of 13th Army's rifle divisions varied from 4,700 to 5,700 men each. The Army was deployed on the east bank of the Neisse River on a 10 km front from Klein Bademeusel to just outside Gross Saerchen, with the 27th and 102nd Rifle Corps in first echelon and the 24th in second. The offensive on 1st Ukrainian Front's sector began at dawn on April 16 with attacks across the Neisse and from a bridgehead that had been forced across the river south of Forst in February and made immediate progress. By about April 20 the division was shifted to 27th Corps. After the fall of Berlin it struck southwards in the Prague operation, ending the war in western Czechoslovakia, north of Pilsen, still in the 27th Rifle Corps of 13th Army.

== Postwar ==
The division was in the vicinity of Karlovy Vary when news of the German surrender arrived. The men and women of the division won their final honor, the Order of Lenin, on May 28, for the capture of Wittenberg. They now carried the final honorific title of 121st Guards Rifle, Gomel, Order of Lenin, Order of the Red Banner, Order of Suvorov Division (Russian: 121-я гвардейская стрелковая Гомельская ордена Ленина Краснознамённая ордена Суворова дивизия). In addition, 31 soldiers of the division had been named as Heroes of the Soviet Union. The division was relocated to Belokorovichi in western Ukraine as part of the 13th Army's 27th Rifle Corps, where it was disbanded in 1946.
