= 16th Army (Soviet Union) =

- 16-я армия
- Active: 1940–1945
- Country: Soviet Union
- Branch: Red Army
- Type: Combined arms
- Size: Field army
- Engagements: World War II: Battle of Smolensk; Battle of Moscow; Invasion of South Sakhalin; Proposed Soviet invasion of Hokkaido

Commanders
- Notable commanders: Konstantin Rokossovsky Ivan Bagramyan Leonty Cheremisov

The 16th Army (Russian: 16-я армия) was a Soviet field army active from 1940 to 1945.

== First Formation, 16th Army ==
The 16th Army Headquarters was formed in July 1940 in the Transbaikal Military District to command Soviet forces deployed in the Dauriya area. On 25 May 1941, four weeks before the commencement of the German invasion of the Soviet Union, Operation Barbarossa, the army received orders to deploy (with six Trans-Baikalian divisions) to Ukraine to be subordinated to the Kiev Special Military District. The first 16th Army units to arrive (109th Motorized Division of the 5th Mechanized Corps) in Berdichev on 18 June 1941. The Army was commanded by Lieutenant-General Mikhail Feodorovich Lukin, and on 22 June the Army Headquarters was located in Orel.

Soon after the commencement of Operation Barbarossa a crisis situation developed on the Western Front sector of the frontline, and on 26 June 1941 16th Army was ordered to redeploy to the area of Orsha - Smolensk. However, the breakthrough of the German 11 Panzer Division in the direction of Orestov during the afternoon of 26 June required an emergency response. Lukin took part of the 109th Motorised Division directly from disembarkation from the trains and directed them towards the enemy. The units involved were designated "Group Lukin."

On 1 July 1941 16th Army consisted of the 32nd Rifle Corps (with the 46th and 152nd Rifle Divisions), two artillery regiments, and the 5th Mechanised Corps (13th and 17th Tank Divisions and the 109th Motorized Division). 126th Corps Artillery Regiment and the 112th Separate Anti-aircraft Artillery Battalion.

Most of the 16th Army began concentrating in the region of Smolensk, but the 5th Mechanised Corps was transferred to the 20th Army and participated in the counterattack at Lepel 6–9 July. On 9 July a status report from the army chief of staff said that the command group, 32nd Rifle Corps, and some units of 5th Mechanised Corps were still at peacetime establishment strength. About this time the separate 57th Tank Division from the Far East joined the army, and on 20 July elements of the 129th Rifle Division arrived as well.

After the breakthrough of German mechanized troops to Smolensk, on 14 July Marshal S. К. Timoshenko ordered Lukin to take command of all units in the garrison city of Smolensk, as well as units arriving in the city by rail and units in the defensive sector directly adjacent to the city. Communication with the rear could be maintained only through Solovyovsk across a wooded and swampy area south of Yartsevo. Street fighting began.

On 20 July 129th Rifle Division's four committed battalions lost 40% of their strength defending the suburbs of Smolensk. Three days later, a Western Front situation report said that '..during the course of 22.7, 16th Army units, continued to conduct severe street battle to secure Smolensk. ..In 34th RC, the trained and armed (almost without machine guns) 127th Rifle Division (up to 600 men) and 158th Rifle Division (about 100 men) went over to the offensive at 1200 22.7'.

The Army HQ was disbanded on 8 August 1941 after encirclement (the Battle of Smolensk (1941)) just west of Smolensk as part of the Western Front.

== Second Formation, 16th Army ==
As part of a restructuring of the forces of Western Front, on 10 August 1941 the second formation of 16 Army was created from forces in the Yartsevo area and placed under the command of Major-General Konstantin Rokossovsky. In September 1941 the newly promoted Lieutenant-General Rokossovsky was tasked with defending the Volokolamsk Highway, and preventing any advance by German forces towards Moscow. By late November, 16th Army had gradually been forced back to the line Krasnaya Polyana-Kryukovo-Istra, but here it held firm until the Red Army went over to the offensive in December. In January 1942 the Army conducted an offensive on the Gzhatsk axis.

In the second half of January 1942, the forces of 16 Army were transferred to the command of 5th Army, and 16 Army Headquarters was deployed to the area of Sukhinichi, where the Army HQ took command of some of the troops and defensive positions of 10th Army. By February the frontline positions in the Sukhinichi area had stabilized.

On 15 July 1942, Rokossovsky was transferred to take command of the Bryansk Front as part of new command arrangements made by Soviet High Command in response to the disastrous Battle of Voronezh (1942). General Zhukov, the commander of Western Front, requested that STAVKA appoint Lieutenant-General Hovhannes Bagramyan, the deputy commander of the right flank 61st Army as the commander of the 16th Army in Rokossovsky's place.

On 11 August 1942 German forces mounted a surprise offensive on the southern flank of Western Front, splitting 61st Army from 16th Army, which was not taking part in the Rzhev-Sychevka Offensive Operation. The German forces threatened Bagramyan's left flank and he reacted quickly, moving his forces to counter the German threat and halting their advance on 9 September.

Until May 1943 the troops of the Army conducted defensive and offensive battles on the Zhizdrinsky District axis.. On 1 May 1943, on the basis of Stavka directives of 16 April 1943, the army was reorganized into the 11th Guards Army in the Western Front.

=== Orders of Battle ===
==== On 1 October 1941 ====
- 38th Rifle Division
- 108th Rifle Division
- 112th Rifle Division
- 214th Rifle Division
- 127th Tank Brigade
- 49, 471, 587 corps artillery regiment (кап).
- 375 howitzer artillery regiment of Supreme High Command Reserve (гап РВГК).
- 700 antitank defense artillery regiment (ап ПТО).
- 1/10 Guards Mortar Regiment (гв. мп).
- 42, 133 Motorized Engineer Battalion (миб).
- 243, 290 Separate sapper battalion (осб).

==== On 1 April 1942 ====
- 5th Guards Rifle Corps
  - 11th Guards Rifle Division
  - 4th Rifle Brigade
  - 30th Rifle Brigade
  - 115th Rifle Brigade
  - 123rd Rifle Brigade
- 12th Guards Rifle Division
- 97th Rifle Division
- 322nd Rifle Division
- 323rd Rifle Division
- 324th Rifle Division
- 328th Rifle Division
- 19th Rifle Brigade
- 94th Tank Brigade
- 146th Tank Brigade
- 41 Guards Corps Artillery Regiment (гв. кап).
- 486 Artillery Regiment (ап).
- 523 Cannon Artillery Regiment (пап).
- 533 antitank defense artillery regiment (ап ПТО).
- 5, 31, 240 separate Guards Mortar Battalion (огв. мдн).
- 172 separate anti-aircraft artillery battalion (озадн).
- 43 separate armored train battalion (одн бронепоездов).
- 145, 243, 451 separate engineer battalion (оиб), 835 separate sapper battalion (осб).
- 168th Fighter Aviation Regiment (иап), 693, 735 light bombardment Regiment (лбап).

==== On 1 January 1943 ====
- 11th Guards Rifle Division
- 97th Rifle Division
- 217th Rifle Division
- 322nd Rifle Division
- 324th Rifle Division
- 4th Rifle Brigade
- 6th Guards Tank Brigade
- 43 separate armored train battalion (одн брп)
- 21 light artillery brigade (лабр) (6 battalion (ад)); 523 Cannon Artillery Regiment (пап); 545, 546 Mortar Artillery Regiment (аминп); 10 separate Guards Mortar Battalion (огв. мдн).
- 1280 Anti-aircraft Artillery Regiment (зенап), 4 separate anti-aircraft artillery battalion (озадн).
- 226, 243, 367 separate engineer battalion (оиб).
- 168 Mixed Aviation Regiment (сап).

== Third Formation, 16th Army ==
16th Army was formed for the third time on 10 July 1943 in the Far Eastern Front and was based on the Special Rifle Corps. From the spring of 1945 the Army was responsible for the defense of the Soviet state border with Japan on the island of Sakhalin, and also along the mainland coast of the Tatar Strait from Sovetskaya Gavan to Nikolaevsk-on-Amur.

On 5 August 1945, the 16th Army, incorporating the 56th Rifle Corps, 3rd, 103rd and 104th fortified areas, 5th and 113th separate infantry brigades, 214th Tank Brigade, and a number of separate infantry, tank, artillery and other units, was subordinated to the newly formed 2nd Far East Front. 56th Rifle Corps, under General Lieutenant J.V. Novoselsky, consisted of 79th Rifle Division, 2nd Rifle Brigade, the Sakhalin Rifle Regiment, the 6th Battalion (infantry) and other formations and units.

During the Soviet–Japanese War in cooperation with the Russian Pacific Fleet 16 Army advanced into Japanese-held South Sakhalin in the Invasion of South Sakhalin, and its forces were involved in the Invasion of the Kuril Islands.

On 1 October 1945 the Army was subordinated to the Far Eastern Military District and within a month was disbanded.

== Army Commanders ==
- Mikhail Fedorovich Lukin, Lieutenant General, (June 1940 - August 1941)
- Konstantin Rokossovsky, Major General (from September 1941 - Lieutenant General), (August 1941 - July 1942)
- Ivan Bagramyan, Lieutenant General, (July 1942 - April 1943)
- Michael G. Dubkov (July 1 – September 8, 1943), Maj.-Gen.
- Leonty Cheremisov (September 8, 1943 – October 8, 1945), Major-General (from September 8, 1945 - Lieutenant-General)
