= Rybinsky District, Yaroslavl Oblast =

Rybinsky District Рыбинский район (Russian)
- District
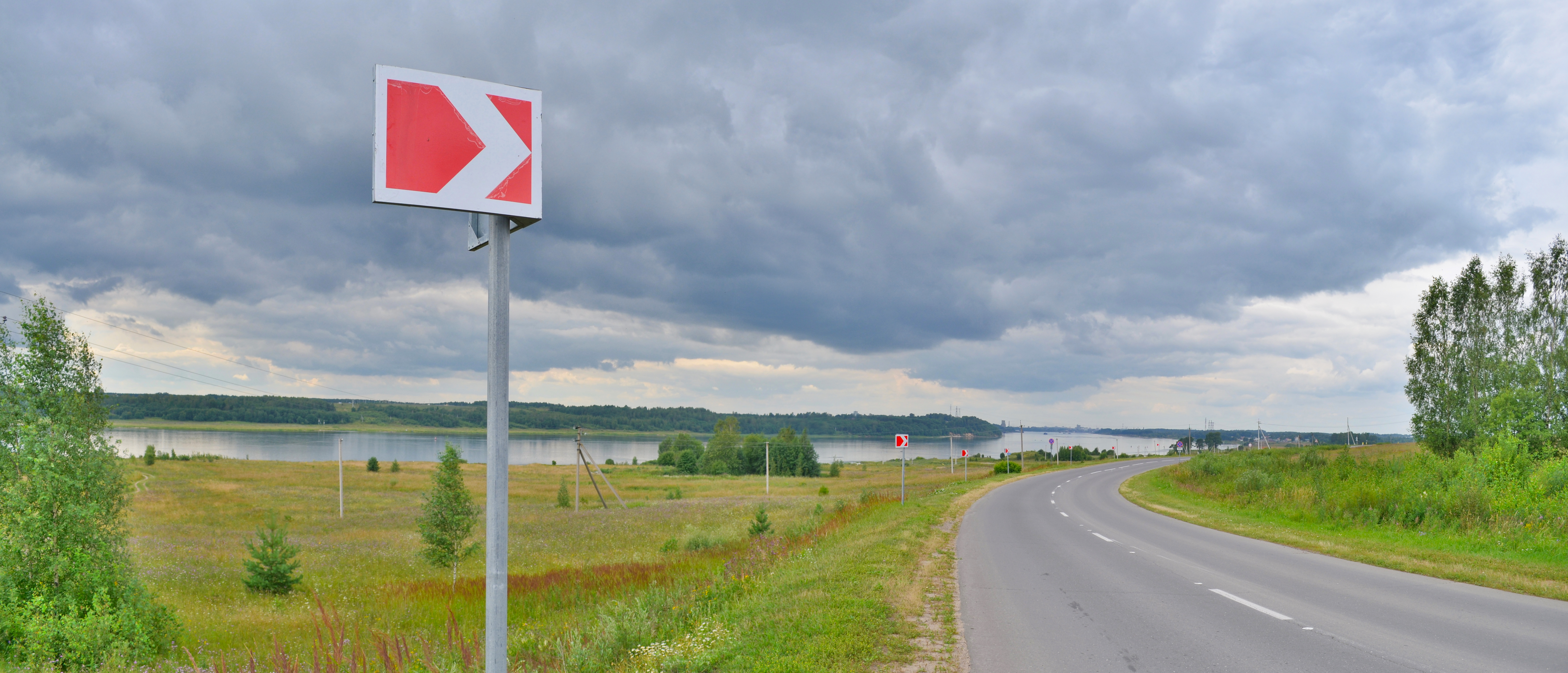
- Spass, Rybinsky District

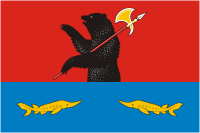
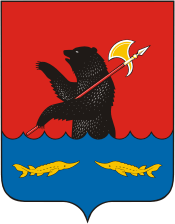
- Flag Coat of arms
- Location of Rybinsky District in Yaroslavl Oblast
- Coordinates: 58°03′N 38°50′E
- Country: Russia
- Federal subject: Yaroslavl Oblast
- Established: 1929
- Administrative center: Rybinsk

Area
  - Total: 3,150 km^{2} (1,220 sq mi)

Population (2010 Census)
  - Total: 28,153
  - Estimate (2018): 26,390 (−6.3%)
  - Density: 8.94/km^{2} (23.1/sq mi)
  - Urban: 9.3%
  - Rural: 90.7%

Administrative structure
  - Administrative divisions: 17 Rural okrugs
  - Inhabited localities: 596 rural localities

Municipal structure
  - Municipally incorporated as: Rybinsky Municipal District
  - Municipal divisions: 0 urban settlements, 11 rural settlements
- Time zone: UTC+3 (MSK)
- OKTMO ID: 78640000
- Website: http://www.admrmr.ru/

Rybinsky District (Russian: Ры́бинский райо́н) is an administrative and municipal district (raion), one of the seventeen in Yaroslavl Oblast, Russia. It is located in the northwest of the oblast. The area of the district is 3,150 square kilometers (1,220 sq mi). Its administrative center is the city of Rybinsk (which is not administratively a part of the district). Population: 28,153 (2010 Census); 31,095 (2002 census); 36,796 (1989 Soviet census). Pavel Batov was born in Filisovo, a village in the district.

== Administrative and municipal status ==
Within the framework of administrative divisions, Rybinsky District is one of the seventeen in the oblast. The city of Rybinsk serves as its administrative center, despite being incorporated separately as a city of oblast significance—an administrative unit with the status equal to that of the districts.

As a municipal division, the district is incorporated as Rybinsky Municipal District. The city of oblast significance of Rybinsk is incorporated separately from the district as Rybinsk Urban Okrug.
