= Filisovo, Yaroslavl Oblast =

Filisovo
- Village
- Фелисово
- Location within Russia
- Coordinates: 57°55′41.0″N 38°49′04.7″E
- Country: Russia
- Oblast: Yaroslavl Oblast

Filisovo (Russian: Фелисово) is a village in Rybinsky District, Yaroslavl Oblast, Russia. It is known as the birthplace of the Red Army general, Pavel Batov.

As of 1 January 2007, Filisovo had the permanent population of only 1 person. Current population number is unknown.
