= Galkino =

Galkino Галкино
- Village
- Location within Vladimir Oblast Location within Russia
- Coordinates: 56°06′N 41°50′E
- Country: Russia
- Region: Vladimir Oblast
- District: Vyaznikovsky District
- Time zone: UTC+3:00

Galkino (Russian: Галкино) is a rural locality (a village) in Posyolok Nikologory, Vyaznikovsky District, Vladimir Oblast, Russia. The population was 326 as of 2010. There are 8 streets.

== Geography ==
Galkino is located on the Tetrukh River, 31 km southwest of Vyazniki (the district's administrative centre) by road. Edon is the nearest rural locality.
