= Khomutovo, Ivanovo Oblast =

Khomutovo Хомутово
- Village
- Location within Ivanovo Oblast Location within Russia
- Coordinates: 56°48′N 40°40′E
- Country: Russia
- Region: Ivanovo Oblast
- District: Teykovsky District
- Time zone: UTC+3:00

Khomutovo (Russian: Хомутово) is a rural locality (a village) in Teykovsky District, Ivanovo Oblast, Russia. Population: 24 (2010 census);

== Geography ==
This rural locality is located 10 kilometres (6.2 mi) from Teykovo (the district's administrative centre), 28 kilometres (17 mi) from Ivanovo (capital of Ivanovo Oblast) and 219 kilometres (136 mi) from Moscow. Berezovik is the nearest rural locality.
