= 51st Army (Russia) =

- 51-я армия
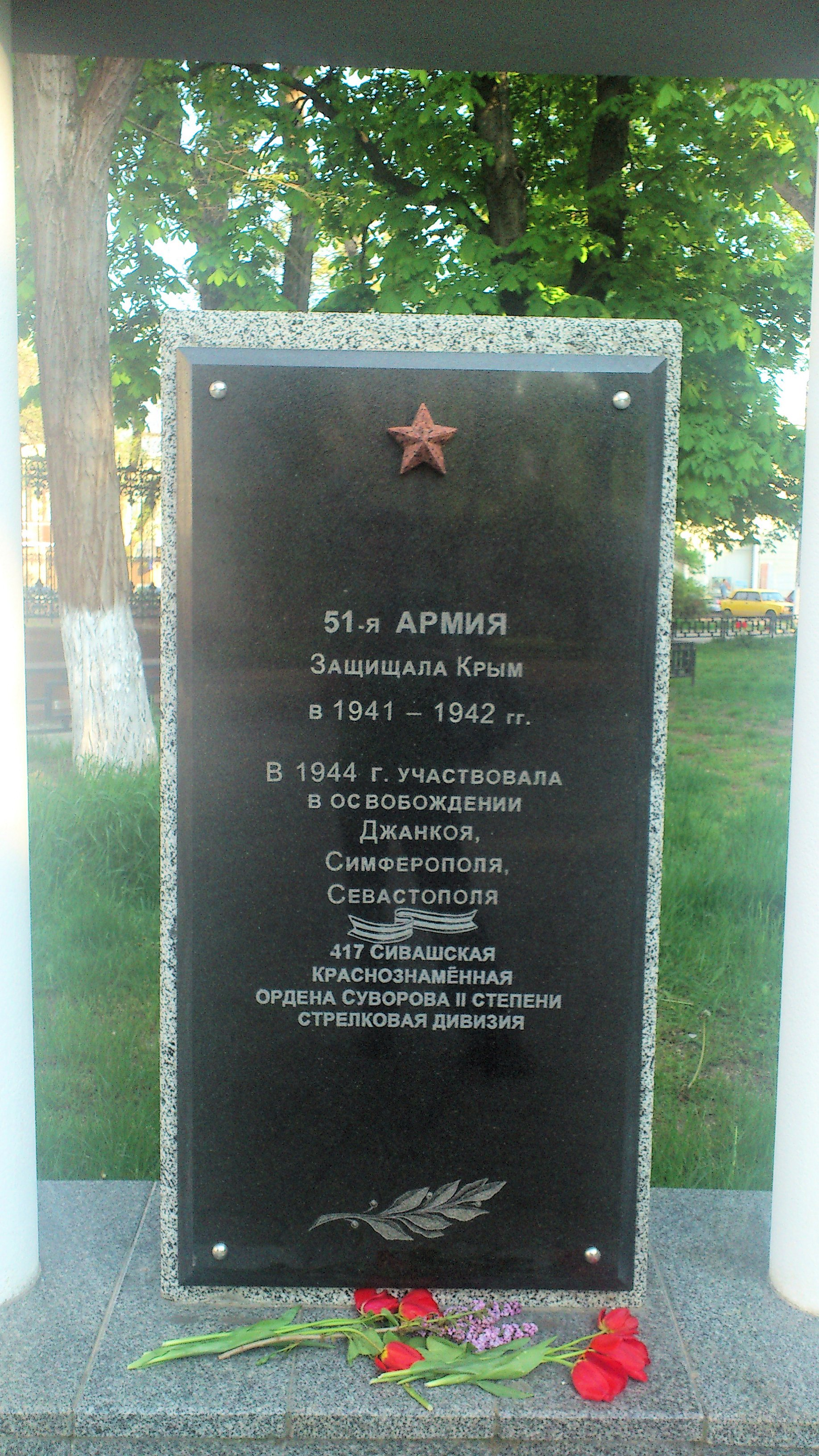
- Memorial to 51st Army in Simferopol
- Active: 1941–45, 1977–1993
- Country: USSR (to 1991); Russia (1992–1993)
- Size: Field army
- Part of: 4th Ukrainian Front
- Engagements: World War II: Battle of the Kerch Peninsula; Battle of Stalingrad; Melitopol Offensive; Courland Pocket

Commanders
- Notable commanders: Pavel Batov; Fyodor Kuznetsov; Yakov Kreizer

The 51st Army (Russian: 51-я армия) was a field army of the Red Army that saw action against the Germans in World War II on both the southern and northern sectors of the front. The army participated in the Battle of the Kerch Peninsula between December 1941 and January 1942; it was destroyed in May 1942 with other Soviet forces when the Wehrmacht launched an operation to dislodge them from the peninsula. The army fought in the Battle of Stalingrad during the winter of 1942–43, helping to defeat German relief attempts. From late 1944 to the end of the war, the army fought in the final cutting-off of German forces in the Courland area next to the Baltic. Deactivated in 1945, the army was activated again in 1977 to secure Sakhalin and the Kuril Islands. Following the dissolution of the Soviet Union, the army continued in existence as a component of the Russian Ground Forces. The army was active during two periods from 1941 until 1997.

== The Crimea ==
The Army was ordered formed on 14 August 1941 in the Crimea based on the 9th Rifle Corps and other units as the 51st Independent Army under Colonel General F.I. Kuznetsov, with the task of guarding the Crimean Peninsula. Pavel Batov was appointed as his deputy. Professor John Erickson in The Road to Stalingrad describes Stalin's rationale for the formation of the Army during a 12 August session within the Stavka war room: Stalin and the Stavka had concluded from the German moves underway at the time that a strike on the Crimea (along with an attack on Bryansk) was likely, and thus the formation of an Independent Army in the Crimea had been decided upon. Thus Kuznetsov was summoned, and after a discussion, he was sent south to take up his new command.

The army's initial forces included the 9th Rifle Corps, the 271st and 276th Rifle Divisions, the 40th, 42nd and 48th Cavalry Divisions, and the 1st, 2nd, 3rd and 4th irregularly formed Crimean Rifle divisions (later converted into regular rifle divisions) and a number of smaller units. However, due to what Erickson describes as Kuznetsov's 'sticking blindly to the prewar plan', which anticipated a seaborne assault, and leaving the Perekop and Sivash approaches too thinly held, Erich von Manstein, leading the German assault, was able to push past the defenses. Therefore, the Stavka ordered that the army command be handed over to Batov.

In November the army was evacuated from the Taman Peninsula and it joined the Transcaucasian Front (briefly known as the Caucasian Front after 30 December 1941). The army participated in the Kerch-Feodosiya landing operation in December 1941 – January 1942 alongside the 44th Army. 51st Army was originally planned to be the Kerch arm of the assault, but delays caused by bad weather and a schedule change prompted by renewed German attacks on Sevastopol resulted in 51st Army troops being landed at Capes Sjuk and Chroni during the night of 26–27 December 1941. The 44th and 51st Armies then formed the Crimean Front under General Dmitri T. Kozlov, formally established on 28 January 1942, which hammered repeatedly at Von Manstein's Eleventh Army. On 1 February 1942, 51st Army comprised the 138th and 302nd Mountain Rifle Divisions, the 224th, 390th, and 396th Rifle Divisions, the 12th Rifle Brigade, 83rd Naval Infantry Brigade, 105th Separate Mountain Rifle Regiment, 55th Tank Brigade, 229th Separate Tank Battalion, artillery units, and other support units. A German offensive was launched against the Front on 8 May 1942. Army commander Lieutenant General Vladimir Nikolayevich Lvov was killed by bomb fragments on 11 May while changing his command post. The offensive concluded around 18 May 1942 with the near complete destruction of Soviet defending forces, which Erickson attributes to bickering between Kozlov and the Front commissar, Lev Mekhlis, and a trail of incompetent actions. Three armies (44th, 47th, and 51st), 21 divisions, 176,000 men, 347 tanks, and nearly 3,500 guns were lost. The remains of the force were evacuated.

== Stalingrad and after ==
After the evacuation 51st Army joined the North Caucasian Front at Kuban. In July, Marshal Budenny received orders to combine the Southern Front and North Caucasian Front into a single formation retaining the title of North Caucasian Front, and 51st Army joined the 'Don group' of that front under General Lieutenant Rodion Malinovsky, along with the 12th Army and the 37th Army. On 22 July, army commander Major general Nikolai Trufanov was relieved of command. As part of the Stalingrad Front (from 1–5 August), then briefly with the Southeast Front (from 6 August until 27 September), and then back with the Stalingrad Front it took part in the Battle of Stalingrad. On 31 July when it came under Stalingrad Front control it was so worn down by its previous rough handling that it was only 3,000 men strong. It was attacked on the same day by the 4th Panzer Army, which was able to break through.

During Operation Uranus, the counterattack from Stalingrad, the 4th Mechanized Corps began its attack from the 51st Army's sector. In early December, 51st Army was deployed to cover the Kotelnikovo approaches against German relief attempts by the LVII. Panzerkorps. On 24–25 December 1942, the commander of 51st Army, Major-General N.I. Trufanov, organized a local offensive operation on the right flank with the forces of three rifle divisions, and moved to the north bank of the Aksay River, on the eve of the Kotelnikovo offensive operation, which eventually defeated the German efforts made as part of Operation Winter Storm to relieve the Sixth Army in Stalingrad. On 30 January 1943, the Luftwaffe's Kampfgeschwader 51 destroyed the 51st Army's Headquarters, near Salsk. Dropping 100 – 250 kg bombs, a wave of Junkers Ju 88s and Heinkel He 111s destroyed the communications center, working offices of the chief-of-staff, the operational headquarters and the offices of the operational duty officer. Up to 20 buildings and personnel billets were also destroyed. Casualties among personnel were also very high.

After January 1943 as part of the Southern Front, that became the 4th Ukrainian Front on 20 October 1943, the 51st Army took part in the Rostov, Donbass (August–September 1943), Melitopol (September–November 1943) and the 1944 Crimean offensive operation. On 1 June 1943 the 2nd Guards Breakthrough Artillery Division was part of the 51st Army. On 1 April 1944, 51st Army included the 1st Guards Rifle Corps (33rd Guards, 91st and 346th Rifle Divisions), 10th Rifle Corps (216th, 257th, and 279th Rifle Divisions), 63rd Rifle Corps (263rd, 267th, and 417th Rifle Divisions), the 77th Rifle Division, the 78th Fortified Region, artillery, armor and other support units. During these operations, the 51st Army's attacks trapped the German XXIX. Armeekorps against the Sea of Azov.

The army was withdrawn to the Reserve of the Supreme High Command (Stavka Reserve) on 20 May and relocated to the area of Polotsk and Vitebsk in Belarus. As part of the 1st Baltic Front it participated in operations clearing Latvia and Lithuania – the Baltic Offensive. Leading the penetration of 1st Baltic Front into German lines, 51st Army reached the Bay of Riga on 31 July 1944, cutting off German Army Group North to the northeast of Riga. Under tremendous pressure, the Germans organized an armored counter-attack (Doppelkopf) from 16 to 27 August 1944 that succeeded in re-opening a 40-kilometer wide corridor through which Army Group North retreated westward into the Courland region of Latvia.

After regrouping in September 1944, the 51st Army attacked westward in October, reaching the Baltic coast north of Memel, and with other 1st Baltic Front armies, definitively cut off Army Group North in Courland, where the German force would remain for the rest of the war. Thereafter, 51st Army took up position on the far western flank of the Soviet forces arrayed against Army Group North (later renamed Army Group Courland). Of the six major battles for Courland, 51st Army's only real progress was during the first Courland battle, from 15 to 22 October 1944, in which the army pushed some ten kilometers north against bitter resistance of the German III. SS-Panzerkorps. Thereafter, the front lines in this area of the Courland front changed little.

After 9 May 1945 it accepted the capitulation of the German Army Group Courland.

Order of Battle 1 May 1945:

- 1st Guards Rifle Corps (53rd Guards, 204th, 267th Rifle Divisions)
- 10th Rifle Corps (91st, 279th, 347th Rifle Divisions),
- 63rd Rifle Corps (77th, 87th, 417th Rifle Divisions)

=== World War II Commanders ===
Commander	Assumption of Command	Handed over Command
Colonel-General Fyodor Kuznetsov	Aug 1941	Nov 1941
Lieutenant-General Pavel Batov	Nov 1941	Dec 1941
Lieutenant-General V. N. Lvov	Dec 1941	May 1942 (KIA)
Major-General Nikolai Kirichenko	May 1942	June 1942
Colonel A. M. Kuznetsov	Jun 1942	July 1942
Major-General Nikolai Trufanov	July 1942	July 1942
Major-General Trofim Kolomiets	July 1942	Sept 1942
Major-General Nikolai Trufanov	Oct 1942	Feb 1943
Lieutenant-General Georgy Zakharov	Feb 1943	Jul 1943
Lieutenant-General Yakov Kreizer	Aug 1943	May 1945

== Postwar ==
During June 1945, the army moved from the Baltic States to the Urals with almost all its forces. In July 1945, the army headquarters became the headquarters of the Ural Military District. The army's 63rd Rifle Corps (77th, 279th and 417th Rifle Divisions) became part of the district. Its 10th Rifle Corps (87th, 91st and 347th Rifle Divisions) became part of the Kazan Military District. The 1st Guards Rifle Corps (53rd Guards, 204th and 267th Rifle Divisions) became part of the Moscow Military District.

In 1977, the 51st Combined Arms Army was re-formed on the basis of the staff of the 2nd Army Corps in the Far East Military District. The army was stationed on Sakhalin and in the Kuril Islands.

=== Order of Battle in the 1980s ===
In 1988, the composition of the 51st Combined Arms Army included: Army headquarters was located at Yuzhno-Sakhalinsk, Sakhalin Oblast.

Formation	Headquarters Location	Remarks
33rd Motor-Rifle Red Banner Division	Khomutovo	97th Separate Tank Battalion(Khomutovo), 465th Motor Rifle Regiment (Aniva), 377th Motor Rifle Regiment (Dolinsk), 389th Motor Rifle Regiment (Dachnoye), 989th Artillery Regiment, 1108th Antiaircraft Missile Regiment
79th Motor Rifle Division	Leonidovo	'Sakhalin Red Banner'; 157th Motor Rifle Regiment (Pobedino/Победино), 398th Motor Rifle Regiment (Gastello), 396th Motor Rifle Regiment (Leonidovo), 284th Artillery Regiment, 1224th Anti-Aircraft Rocket (Missile) Regiment (Pobedino)
18th Machine Gun Artillery Division	Settlement Goryachiye Klyuchi (Iturup), Sakhalin	110th Separate Tank Battalion (Kunashir), 484th Machine-Gun Artillery Regiment, 605th Machine-Gun Artillery Regiment, 468th Artillery Regiment, 490th Antiaircraft Artillery Regiment (Iturup)

Other Army-level troops reported by Feskov et al. 2013, as of 1988, included the 31st Anti-Aircraft Rocket Brigade with surface-to-air missiles at Yuzhno-Sakhalinsk, the 326th Engineer-Sapper Regiment also at Yuzno-Sakhalinsk; and the 1101st Separate Motor Rifle Regiment at Sokol. The 264th Artillery Brigade and 957th Anti-Tank Artillery Regiment were based at Solovevka.

On 11 October 1993 the army was reorganized as the 68th Army Corps. Its 33rd Motor Rifle Division and 18th Machine Gun Artillery Division became part of the 68th Army Corps. The 79th Motor Rifle Division was disbanded in 1994. The 68th Army Corps disbanded in 2010, but was later reformed in 2014.
