= Yekaterinoslavka =

Name of several Russian rural localities

Yekaterinoslavka (Russian: Екатериносла́вка) is the name of several rural localities in Russia:

- Yekaterinoslavka, Amur Oblast, a selo in Yekaterinoslavsky Rural Settlement of Oktyabrsky District of Amur Oblast
- Yekaterinoslavka, Republic of Bashkortostan, a village in Shingak-Kulsky Selsoviet of Chishminsky District of the Republic of Bashkortostan
- Yekaterinoslavka, Khabarovsk Krai, a selo in imeni Lazo District of Khabarovsk Krai
- Yekaterinoslavka, Omsk Oblast, a selo in Yekaterinoslavsky Rural Okrug of Sherbakulsky District of Omsk Oblast
- Yekaterinoslavka, Dombarovsky District, Orenburg Oblast, a selo in Polevoy Selsoviet of Dombarovsky District of Orenburg Oblast
- Yekaterinoslavka, Tyulgansky District, Orenburg Oblast, a selo in Yekaterinoslavsky Selsoviet of Tyulgansky District of Orenburg Oblast
