= Krasnaya Rechka, Zabaykalsky Krai =

Krasnaya Rechka Красная Речка
- Settlement
- Location within Zabaykalsky Krai Location within Russia
- Coordinates: 51°38′N 113°03′E
- Country: Russia
- Region: Zabaykalsky Krai
- District: Ulyotovsky District
- Time zone: UTC+9:00

Krasnaya Rechka (Russian: Красная Речка) is a rural locality (a settlement) in Ulyotovsky District, Zabaykalsky Krai, Russia. Population: 101 (2021 census); 136 (2010 census); There are 7 streets in this settlement.

== Geography ==
This rural locality is located 50 km from Ulyoty (the district's administrative centre), 54 km from Chita (capital of Zabaykalsky Krai) and 5,227 km from Moscow. Golubichnaya is the nearest rural locality.
