= Khomutovo, Vologda Oblast =

Khomutovo Хомутово
- Village
- Location within Vologda Oblast Location within Russia
- Coordinates: 59°58′N 40°12′E
- Country: Russia
- Region: Vologda Oblast
- District: Kharovsky District
- Time zone: UTC+3:00

Khomutovo (Russian: Хомутово) is a rural locality (a village) in Kharovskoye Rural Settlement, Kharovsky District, Vologda Oblast, Russia. The population was 4 as of 2002.

== Geography ==
Khomutovo is located 7 km north of Kharovsk (the district's administrative centre) by road. Bilgachevo is the nearest rural locality.
