= Nikolskoye, Amur Oblast =

Nikolskoye Никольское
- Selo
- Location within Amur Oblast Location within Russia
- Coordinates: 50°55′N 128°17′E
- Country: Russia
- Region: Amur Oblast
- District: Belogorsky District
- Time zone: UTC+9:00

Nikolskoye (Russian: Никольское) is a rural locality (a selo) and the administrative center of Nikolsky Selsoviet of Belogorsky District, Amur Oblast, Russia. The population was 1449 as of 2018. There are 10 streets.

== Geography ==
Nikolskoye is located on the left bank of the Tom River, 14 km west of Belogorsk (the district's administrative centre) by road. Klyuchi is the nearest rural locality.
