= Vystrel course =

The Vystrel course (Russian: Курсы «Выстрел») was the popular name for an officer training course of the Soviet Armed Forces, later part of the Russian Armed Forces, located in Solnechnogorsk. The training course had a one-year curriculum to train battalion and regiment level command and political personnel for the rifle (infantry) arm of the Red Army, later the Soviet Army, as well as officers from the Socialist Bloc countries.

== History ==
The Higher Rifle School for Command Personnel of the Workers-Peasant Red Army was formed in November 1918 in place of the Imperial Russian Army's Oranienbaum Rifle Officer School. The school's task was officer training for the infantry, but also research and development of weaponry and the production of educational literature. The course, provided twice a year for five and a half month periods, trained future company commanders. In its first decade of existence, 6,000 officers completed it, with class sizes averaging about 300 students in the 1920s and 1930s. In 1932 the course was divided into two faculties, one for infantry and another for mechanized tactics; the latter was split off a year later. In 1936 Vystrel expanded to include courses for battalion and regimental commanders.

On December 26, 1926, the training battalion of the Rifle Tactical Courses was used as the basis for the formation of the 2nd Rifle Regiment of the Moscow Proletarian Rifle Division of the Moscow Military District. In 1929 Vystrel added a sniper training course to its structure.

After the launch of Operation Barbarossa in 1941 the Courses were evacuated from Moscow Oblast's Solnechnogorsk to Kyshtym in the Chelyabinsk Oblast with branches of the courses also organised in Gorky, Ulyanovsk, Sverdlovsk, Novosibirsk, Arkhangelsk and Ordzhonikidze. Over 200 of the Courses' alumni received the Hero of the Soviet Union medal (of them 8 have received it twice) and thousands received lesser decorations. After the War the Courses were busy analyzing the combat experience and implementing the lessons learned into the training of future cadres. From the 1950s on the doors of the center were opened to officers from the Warsaw Pact and allied countries, such as SFR Yugoslavia, People's Republic of China, Vietnam, Mongolian People's Republic, India, Egypt, Syria, Algeria, Angola, Cuba, Nicaragua, North Korea etc.

In 1974 a training course for United Nations peacekeeping military observers was added to the Vystrel. The training of foreign officers continued after the collapse of the USSR, including training for peacekeeping missions.

On 1 November 1998, it was combined with the Frunze Military Academy and the Malinovsky Military Armored Forces Academy to form the Combined Arms Academy of the Armed Forces of the Russian Federation, in accordance with a decree of the government of the Russian Federation. Under the umbrella of the Combined Arms Academy, the courses became the Vystrel Officer Training Center. The training center was abolished during the Russian military reform in 2009.

== Commanders ==
The following commanded the course:

- Nikolay Filatov (1918–1922)
- Pavel Pavlov (1922–1923)
- Nikolay Kuibyshev (1923–1925)
- Grigory Khakhanyan (1925–1927)
- Ivan Smolin (1927–1929)
- Kirill Stutzka (1929–1932)
- Konstantin Goncharuk (1932–1935)
- Leonty Ugryumov (1935–1936)
- Komdiv Alexander Inno (1936–1937)
- Colonel Lev Sosedov (acting, 1937–1938)
- Komdiv Andrey Smirnov (1938–1940)
- Major General Viktor Kosyakin (1940–1941)
- Major General Sergey Smirnov (1941–1945; promoted to Lieutenant General January 1944)
- Colonel General Max Reyter (1946–1950)
- Army General Georgy Zakharov (1950–1953)
- Colonel General Afanasy Beloborodov (1953–1954)
- Marshal of the Soviet Union Kirill Meretskov (1954–1955)
- Lieutenant General Pyotr Sobennikov (1955–1959)
- Colonel General Ivan Lyudnikov (1959–1963)
- Army General Yakov Kreizer (1963–1969)
- Lieutenant General David Dragunsky (1969–1986; promoted to Colonel General November 1970)
- Army General Fedot Kryvda (1986–1987)
- Colonel General Ivan Gashkov (1987–1988)
- Colonel General Leonid Generalov (1988–1991)
- Army General Vladimir Shuralyov (1991–1992)
- Colonel General Viktor Novozhilov (1992–1998)
- Lieutenant General Viktor Kochemasov (1998–2006)

== Official designation ==
1918, November 21 — Higher Rifle School for Command Personnel of the Workers-Peasant Red Army (Высшая стрелковая школа командного состава РККА)

1921, June 7 — Higher Rifle Tactical School for Command Personnel of the Workers-Peasant Red Army (Высшая тактическо-стрелковая школа командного состава РККА)

1921, October 13 — Higher Rifle Tactical School for Command Personnel of the Workers-Peasant Red Army "Third Comintern" (Высшая тактическо-стрелковая школа командного состава РККА имени III Коминтерна)

1923, April 24 — Higher Rifle Tactical School for Command Personnel of the Workers-Peasant Red Army "Third Comintern" «Vystrel» (Высшая тактическо-стрелковая школа командного состава РККА имени Коминтерна «Выстрел»)

1924, October 9 — Rifle Tactical Courses for Development of Command Personnel of the Workers-Peasant Red Army "Third Comintern" (Стрелково-тактические курсы усовершенствования комсостава РККА имени III Коминтерна)

1932, May 10 — Rifle Tactical Institute «Vystrel» (Стрелково-тактический институт «Выстрел»)

1935, December 9 — Higher Rifle Tactical Red Banner Courses for Development of Infantry Officers «Vystrel» "Marshal of the Soviet Union B. M. Shaposhnikov" (Высшие стрелково-тактические Краснознамённые курсы усовершенствования офицерского состава пехоты «Выстрел» имени Маршала Советского Союза Б. М. Шапошникова)

1954, ? — Central Order of Lenin and Red Banner Tactical Rifle Courses for Development of Officers of the Soviet Army «Vystrel» "Marshal of the Soviet Union B. M. Shaposhnikov" (Центральные ордена Ленина, Краснознамённые стрелково-тактические курсы усовершенствования офицерского состава Советской Армии «Выстрел» имени Маршала Советского Союза Б. М. Шапошникова)

1963, December 11 — Higher Officer Order of Lenin and Red Banner Courses «Vystrel» "Marshal of the Soviet Union B. M. Shaposhnikov" (Высшие офицерские ордена Ленина, Краснознамённые курсы «Выстрел» имени Маршала Советского Союза Б. М. Шапошникова)

1998, November 1 — Order of Lenin and Red Banner Training Center «Vystrel» of the Combined Arms Academy of the Armed Forces of the Russian Federation (Учебный орденов Ленина и Октябрьской Революции, Краснознамённый центр «Выстрел» Общевойсковой академии Вооружённых Сил Российской Федерации)

2009, October 14 — the «Vystrel» Training Center was disbanded

2011, December 10 — a Museum of Combat and Labor Glory «Vystrel» (Музей ратной и трудовой славы «Выстрел») was founded in the building of the center's Officers' Club

2015, May 19 — the Minister of Defence signed an order for the formation of a Military Formations Command Personnel Training Center (Центр подготовки руководящего состава соединений) as a successor of the traditions of the «Vystrel»

2016, January 12 — the Military Formations Command Personnel Training Center was reformed into Land Forces Inspection (Инспекция Сухопутных войск)

Note that Vystrel is a word play, both an actual Russian word meaning 'shot' and a portmanteau from Higher Rifle [Tactical School] «Vystrel» (Высшая тактическо-стрелковая школа > Выстрел).
