= 267th Rifle Division =

- Active: July 1941 – July 1942 (1st formation); Sept. 1942 – early 1946 (2nd formation)
- Country: Soviet Union
- Branch: Red Army
- Type: Rifle division
- Engagements: World War II
- Decorations: Order of the Red Banner (2nd formation); Order of Suvorov, 2nd class (2nd formation)
- Battle honours: Sivash (2nd formation)

The 267th Rifle Division (Russian: 267-я стрелковая дивизия) was an infantry division of the Soviet Union's Red Army during World War II.

First formed in the summer of 1941, the division was destroyed in early 1942 during the Lyuban offensive operation of the siege of Leningrad. Reformed in the summer of 1942, the division's second formation fought in the Third Battle of Kharkov, the Crimean offensive, and in the Baltic states.

== History ==
=== First formation ===
The division began forming from reservists on 10 July 1941 at Stary Oskol, part of the Orel Military District. Its basic order of battle included the 844th, the 846th, and the 848th Rifle Regiments, as well as the 845th Artillery Regiment. By mid-August, the 268th had been assigned to the 52nd Army, defending the Volkhov River line near Leningrad, where it remained until early 1942. The division's positions were located in impassable swampy forests, and as a result it held a front of 34 kilometers in October 1941. From January 1942, the division fought in the Lyuban offensive operation, initially as part of the 2nd Shock Army Operations Group, attacking across the Volkhov. The Soviet attack achieved a breakthrough, and in February the 267th was transferred to General Korovnikov's Operational Mobile Group of the 59th Army, which was attempting to exploit the breakthrough by advancing into the rear of the German troops besieging Leningrad. A German counterattack in the spring cut off the 2nd Shock Army and the 59th Army, and the division was trapped in the swamps west of Volkhov. It took several months for the German forces to completely clear the pocket, but by 1 June the division had only 2687 men, 964 officers, and 773 non-commissioned officers. After the pocket was eliminated, the 267th was officially disbanded on 30 July 1942.

=== Second formation ===
The division was reformed on 12 September 1942 at Serpukhov, part of the Moscow Military District, with the same basic order of battle as the previous division. In mid-September the 267th was transferred to the Moscow Defence Zone for training, and in late November it was sent to the front as part of the 6th Army of the Voronezh Front. At the end of 1942 the division moved south with the 6th Army to the Southwestern Front, and fought in the Soviet offensive in early 1943 towards Kharkov and the northern Donbas. The 267th remained with the 6th Army until September 1943, and was usually part of the 15th Rifle Corps. In September, the division was withdrawn to the Reserve of the Supreme High Command (RVGK), but returned to the front a month later in the 28th Army of the 4th Ukrainian Front. It was transferred to the 5th Shock Army's 63rd Rifle Corps in November, and in January 1944 was withdrawn to the RVGK with the 63rd Corps.

In February, the corps and the 267th joined the 51st Army, with which they fought in the Crimean offensive in May 1944. After the recapture of Crimea, the 51st Army became part of the RVGK and moved north to the 1st Baltic Front. By 27 July, the division was fighting at Šiauliai during the Šiauliai offensive. On 15 August, the division was fighting off armored counterattacks from the Großdeutschland Division and the 4th and 12th Panzer Divisions at Auce. From late August to the end of the war, the 267th was part of the army's 1st Guards Rifle Corps. In February 1945, the army transferred to the 2nd Baltic Front, and it spent the last weeks of the war blockading German troops trapped in the Courland Pocket. In the fall of 1945, the division and the 1st Guards Rifle Corps were relocated to the Moscow Military District, with the division stationed at Tula prior to its disbandment by early 1946.
