= List of Soviet Army divisions 1989–1991 =

This article is an (incomplete) listing of Soviet Ground Forces divisions in 1990, and corresponding information about their later status in 2006.

The Soviets maintained their units at varying degrees of readiness in peacetime, and divided their ground units into two broad readiness categories:

- Развернутая – Ready (expanded, filled up) A unit was considered Ready, if it could conduct combat operations with little or no mobilisation.
- Неразвернутая – Not Ready

Some divisions are referred to as 'Reserve' (there is a Russian article for reserve unit at ru:Запасная часть). The Russian word for reserve (ru:Запас) literally translates as 'Spare'. The personnel went on the reserve rolls, and for officers and NCOs this means they add 'v zapase' to their rank (e.g. kapitan v zapase). The unit itself changes readiness status from A, to either B (Б), V (В) or G (Г). This means a higher degree of equipment conservation, lower training and operational performance, etc.

The abbreviation BKhVT means Weapons and Equipment Storage Base.

== Motor rifle divisions ==
Division	Location, Status 1990	Location, Status 2006	Origin
1st Guards "Moscow-Minsk" Motor Rifle Division	11th Guards Army, Kaliningrad, Baltic MD	Reduced to a brigade 2002, regiment in 2009	1st Guards Rifle Division (second formation)
2nd Guards Motor Rifle Division	Alabino, Moscow Military District	No change; brigade 2009–2013	2nd Guards Rifle Division. 1957–64 23 Guards MRD.
3rd Guards Motor Rifle Division	Coastal defence division, Baltic Fleet, Klaipėda	Disbanded 1 September 1993.	3rd Guards Rifle Division, to MRD June 1957. October 1989 transferred to Baltic Fleet.
4th Guards Motor Rifle Division	Turkestan Military District, Termez	Disbanded 1989	4th Guards Mechanised Corps, Kiev Military District, then 4th Guards Mech Div, then 63rd Guards MRD, 4 Gds MRD 1964. Moved from Lugansk to Termez in February 1980.
4th Motor Rifle Division	Buzuluk, Orenburg Oblast, Ural Military District	Disbanded July 1959	4th Rifle Division, formed June 1957.
5th Guards Motor Rifle Division	40th Army, Shindand, Afghanistan, 1989	Withdrawn back to base 1989–91, Kushka, now Military of Turkmenistan	5th Guards Mechanized Corps, 53rd Guards Motor Rifle Division 1957, 1965 became 5th Guards Motor Rifle Division
6th Guards Motor Rifle Division (I)	Bernau, East Germany, 20th Guards Army	Redesignated 90th Guards Tank Division, February 1985.	Formed Bernau, East Germany, from 6th Guards Mechanised Division, May 1957.
6th Guards "Vitebsko-Novgorodskaya" Motor Rifle Division(II)	Northern Group of Forces, Borne Sulinowo, Poland	After redesignation as 6 GMRD in 1985, became storage base, Moscow Military District	Activated 25 June 1957 in Borne Sulinovo, Poland, as the 38th Guards Tank Division, from the 26th Guards Mechanised Division.
8th Guards Motor Rifle Division (I)	Haapsalu, Estonia	Disbanded March 1960	Formed June 1957 from 8th Guards Rifle Division. Disbanded March 1960, with 2–3 regiments transferred to 36th Guards Motor Rifle Division. 36 GMRD renamed 8 GMRD (II) in May 1960.
8th Guards Panfilovtsy Motor Rifle Division (II)	17th Army Corps, Frunze, Turkestan Military District	Part of Kyrgyz armed forces	Formed Klooga, Estonia, as 36 GMRD, from 36 Gds Mech Div, June 1957. Renamed 8 GMRD (II) May 1960. In May 1967 moved to Frunze. Taken over by Kyrgyzstan, June 1992. Not Ready Division – Cadre High Strength.
9th Guards Motor Rifle Division	Sayn-Shand, Mongolia, 6th Guards Tank Army, Transbaikal Military District	Disbanded 1958	9th Guards Mechanised Corps Formed from 9th Guards Mech Division, June 1957.
9th Motor Rifle Division	12th Army Corps, Maykop, North Caucasus Military District	1992 became 131 MRB, now 7th Military Base, Gudauta	9th Infantry Division
10th Guards Motor Rifle Division	31st Army Corps, TCMD, Akhaltsikhe, Georgia	Disbanded March 1992	10th Guards Rifle Division. Not Ready Division – Reduced Strength II
11th Guards Motor Rifle Division	Transbaikal Military District (Bezrechnaya), 55th Army Corps	Became 5890 BKhVT 1 December 1989, disbanded 1992	7th Guards Mechanised Corps (WW2)
12th Motor Rifle Division (I)	Belogorsk, Far Eastern Military District	Disbanded 1958	12th Amurskaya Rifle Division
12th Motor Rifle Division (II)	Boganuur, Mongolia (1979–1992), 39th Army	5517 BKhVT 1992, disbanded 1993.	Formed 1960 (Holm/Feskov 2015)
13th Motor Rifle Division (I)	Ulan-Ude, Transbaikal Military District	Disbanded 1958	Established 1957 from 13 TD, originally 61 TD (Second World War)(Holm/Feskov 2015)
13th Motor Rifle Division (II)	Biysk, Altai Krai, 33rd Army Corps, Siberian Military District	5351 BKhVT 1989, 13 Gds MRD, July 1992, 5349 Guards BKhVT 1998	Activated 1 September 1960.
14th Guards Motor Rifle Division	Juterbog, East Germany, 20th Guards Army, 1957–82	Became 32nd GTD	
15th Motor Rifle Division	7th Guards Army, Kirovakan, Transcaucasian Military District	Disbanded 1992, some equipment handed over to Armenia.	15th Rifle Division. Previously 26th Mech Div and 100th MRD. Became 15th MRD 1965.
16th Guards Motor Rifle Division	Chernyakhovsk, Kaliningrad Oblast, Baltic Military District	1957–1960	16th Guards Rifle Division
17th Guards Motor Rifle Division	Khmelnitskiy, Carpathian Military District, 13th Army	Part of Ukrainian Ground Forces	40th Guards Rifle Division, World War II
18th Guards Motor Rifle Division	Mladá Boleslav CGF, Czechoslovakia	Baltic Fleet Ground Forces, Kaliningrad	18th Guards Rifle Division. 30 Guards MRD 1957–64.
19th Motor Rifle Division	42nd Army Corps, North Caucasus Military District, Vladikavkaz	Resubordinated to 58th Army, 1995	19th MRD 1965 ← 92nd MRD 1957 <- 19th Rifle Division
20th Guards Motor Rifle Division	1st Guards Tank Army, Grimma, Group of Soviet Forces in Germany,	Withdrawn to Volgograd, North Caucasus MD, June 1993.	8th Guards Mechanised Corps, 8th Guards Mechanised Division. Became 20 Gds MRD May 1957.
21st Motor Rifle Division	2nd Guards Tank Army, Group of Soviet Forces in Germany, Perleberg	Omsk, Siberian Military District?	416th Rifle Division (World War II). 416 RD (II) became 18 Mech Div -> 18 MRD (1957) -> 21 MRD 1965, went back to Omsk, became 180 MRB, and finally became a storage site in 1997, and then disbanded only in 2007.
22nd Motor Rifle Division	Petropavlovsk-Kamchatsky, 25th Army Corps, Far Eastern Military District	Became 40th independent Motor Rifle Brigade, 1 June 2002, Naval Infantry 2007.	22nd Rifle Division
23rd Guards Motor Rifle Division	Kirovabad, 4th Army, Transcaucasian Military District	Disbanded July 1992, all weapons to Azerbaijan armed forces	14th Guards Cavalry Division and 16th Guards Cavalry Division, then 31st Guards Mechanised Division. 23 Guards MRD 17 November 1964 (25 Guards MRD June 1957).
24th Motor Rifle Division	13th Army, Carpathian Military District, Yavoriv	Part of Ukrainian Ground Forces	24th Rifle Division
25th Guards Motor Rifle Division	Lubny, 1st Guards Army, Kiev Military District	Part of Ukrainian Ground Forces	25th Guards Rifle Division. 115 Guards 1957–64.
26th Guards Motor Rifle Division	11th Guards Army, Baltic Military District, Gusev	Disbanded 1991	26th Guards Rifle Division
27th Guards Motor Rifle Division	Group of Soviet Forces in Germany, Halle	Totskoye, Volga-Ural Military District	27th Guards Rifle Division. 1957–64 21st Guards MRD.
28th Guards Motor Rifle Division	Chernomorskoye, Odessa Military District	Became 28th Mechanized Brigade (Ukraine) circa 2001	28th Guards Rifle Division
29th Guards Motor Rifle Division	Kaunas, Baltic Military District, 10th Army Corps	Redesignated 31 Guards MRD 1965	From 29 Guards Mech Div 31 Guards MRD 1965; 21 Guards TD May 1977.
29th Motor Rifle Division	Kamen-Rybolov, Far Eastern Military District, 5th Army	Disbanded 1994.	29th Rifle Division (63 Mech Div; 110 MRD 1957). Moved from Shikhany to Far East in 1968.
30th Guards Motor Rifle Division	Central Group of Forces, Zvolen, Czechoslovakia	Disbanded at Marina Gorka, Belarus	55th Guards Rifle Division
32nd Guards Motor Rifle Division	Kalinin, Moscow Military District	1989 BKhVT, disbanded 1993.	32nd Guards Rifle Division. 1975-64 11 Guards MRD.
33rd Guards Motor Rifle Division	Kishinev, Moldova, Odessa Military District	Disbanded 1960	33 Guards Mech Division
33rd Motor Rifle Division	Khomutovo, Far Eastern Military District	Now storage base	342nd Rifle Division
34th "Simpheropolskaya" Motor Rifle Division	Ural Military District, Sverdlovsk	Volga-Ural Military District, Yekaterinburg	34 MRD 1965 < 126th MRD 1957 < 1955 77th Rifle Division
35th Motor Rifle Division	20th Guards Army, Group of Soviet Forces in Germany, Krampnitz (Potsdam)	Disbanded 1992	35 MRD 1965, 19th MRD 1957, by 1955 1st Mech Div from 1st Mechanised Corps
36th Guards Motor Rifle Division	Klooga, Estonia, 4th Guards Army Corps	Disbanded May 1960	36 Guards Mechanised Division
36th Motor Rifle Division	Artemovsk, 64th Army Corps, Kiev Military District	Disbanded 1990	Formed 1966
38th Guards Motor Rifle Division	36th Army, Transbaikal Military District, Sretensk	MG Artillery Division	38th Guards Rifle Division, 38 Guards MRD 1965; 131 MGAD 1989.
39th Guards Motor Rifle Division	8th Guards Army, Group of Soviet Forces in Germany, Ohrdruf	Disbanded 1992	39th Guards Rifle Division
40th Motor Rifle Division	5th Guards Army, Far Eastern Military District, Smolyaninovo	To Pacific Ocean Fleet as coastal defence division	40th Rifle Division
41st Motor Rifle Division	39th Army, Mongolia, Choir	Disbanded 1992	Formed 1967 from elements of 52nd MRD
42nd Guards Motor Rifle Division	North Caucasus Military District, Grozny	Became 173rd Training Centre, then disbanded 1992	24th Guards Rifle Division
43rd Training Motor Rifle Division	Volga Military District, Kuybyshev	Became 469th District Training Centre	43 RD (WW2), 130 MRD 1957, 43 MRD 1965
45th Guards Motor Rifle Division	30th Guards Army Corps, Leningrad Military District, Kamenka	By 2005 had become 138th Guards Motor Rifle Brigade	45th Guards Rifle Division, World War II, to MRD 1957
46th Motor Rifle Division	64th Army Corps, Kiev Military District, Voroshilovgrad	Disbanded 1989	Formed 1980
47th Motor Rifle Division	1st Guards Army, Konotop	Became storage base 1989, combined with 39th Guards Motor Rifle Division 1991 to form 5001st Guards Weapons and Equipment Storage Base	
47th Guards Motor Rifle Division	Dalnerechensk, Primorskiy Kray, 5th Army, Far Eastern Military District	Disbanded November 1959	3rd Guards Mechanized Corps
48th Motor Rifle Division	Central Group of Forces, Vysoké Mýto, Czechoslovakia	Withdrawn to Chuguev, under KGB control, later disbanded	48th Rifle Division, 118 MRD 1957 – November 1964.
50th Guards Motor Rifle Division	Belorussian Military District, Brest	Part of Armed Forces of Belarus	50th Guards Rifle Division (ru:50-я гвардейская стрелковая дивизия)
51st Guards Motor Rifle Division (I)	10th Army Corps, Baltic Military District, Ventspils	Disbanded January 1959	76th Rifle Division, which became 51st Guards Rifle Division (51 GRD) (Feskov et al. 2013, 162)
51st Guards Motor Rifle Division (II)	13th Army, Carpathian Military District, Vladimir-Volynskiy	Became Ukrainian Ground Forces' 51st Mechanized Brigade	15th Guards Rifle Division
52nd Motor Rifle Division	Transbaikal Military District, Nizhneudinsk	Storage base, later disbanded	347th Rifle Division
53rd Guards Training Motor Rifle Division	Kovrov, Moscow Military District	Became 26 GTTD 1979	62 Gds Mech Div; 1957 62 Gds MRD; 1960 62 Gds Training MRD; 1964 53 Gds Training MRD.
54th Motor Rifle Division	6th Army, Leningrad Military District, Alakurtti	Reduced to storage base	341st Rifle Division (ru:341-я стрелковая дивизия (2-го формирования))
56th Motor Rifle Division	Siberian Military District, Omsk	Reorganised as District Training Centre, later disbanded	67th Mechanised Division, 56th Motor Rifle Division (Second Formation) 1964–65.
57th Guards Motor Rifle Division	8th Guards Army, Group of Soviet Forces in Germany, Naumburg	Disbanded 1993 at Chelyabinsk	57th Guards Rifle Division
58th Motor Rifle Division	36th Army Corps, Turkestan Military District, Kyzyl-Arvat	Formed 1957 Kyzyl-Arvat, became part of Turkmenistan armed forces	344th Rifle Division
59th Guards Motor Rifle Division	14th Guards Army, Odessa Military District, Tiraspol	Became 8th Motor Rifle Brigade, later disbanded	59th Guards Rifle Division, World War II
60th Motor Rifle Division	4th Army, Transcaucasian Military District, Lenkoran	Formed Lenkoran, became part of Military of Azerbaijan	6th Rifle Division
61st Training Motor Rifle Division	Turkestan Military District, Ashkabad	Part of Turkmenistan armed forces	357th Rifle Division
62nd Motor Rifle Division	33rd Army Corps, Siberian Military District, Itatka	Disbanded 1994 Omsk	Formed 1972 at Maykop, effectively as a mobilisation division. Upgraded to a regular division May 1972 and moved to Itatka. Reduced to storage base 1989, moved to Omsk. Disbanded 1994.
63rd Guards Motor Rifle Division	Leningrad Military District, Sertolovo	Became 56th District Training Centre	63rd Guards Rifle Division
64th Guards Motor Rifle Division	30th Guards Army Corps, Leningrad Military District (Sapernoye)	Reduced to 36 BKhVT 1997, disbanded 2007.	64th Guards Rifle Division
65th Motor Rifle Division (I)	Kungar, Perm Oblast, Ural Military District.	Formed June 1957, disbanded January 1959.	
66th Guards Training Motor Rifle Division	Carpathian Military District, Chernovtsy	110th Guards DTC 1987, then Ukrainian armed forces	66th Guards Rifle Division
67th Training Motor Rifle Division	Omsk, Siberian Military District	1957–65	From 67 Mechanised Division; became 56 TMRD. 1980 mobilisation division at Vologda, formed 1970, reorganised as regular division and moved to Skovorodino in Far East. Became 115 Gds MRD 1992, and a BKhVT in 2002.
68th Motor Rifle Division	Turkestan Military District, Sary Ozek	Part of Military of Kazakhstan	Former 372nd Rifle Division
69th "Sevskaya" Motor Rifle Division	26th Army Corps, Leningrad Military District, Vologda	Reduced to storage base	69th "Sevskaya" Rifle Division; became MR formation at Vologda.
70th Guards Motor Rifle Division	38th Army, Carpathian Military District, Ivano-Frankovsk	1991 857th Military Equipment Storage Base	70th Guards Rifle Division
71st Motor Rifle Division	Semipalatinsk, Semipalatinsk Oblast, 1 AK/40th Army	Taken over by Kazakhstan 3.1992.	Formed 1984 from parts of 155 MRD.
72nd Guards Motor Rifle Division	1st Guards Army, Kiev Military District, Belaya Tserkov	Became Ukrainian 72nd Mechanised Division	72nd Guards Rifle Division
73rd Motor Rifle Division	Far Eastern Military District, Novoe	Disbanded 1989	73rd Rifle Division. Formed Novorossiysk 1957, to Far East 1968.
74th Motor Rifle Division	Siberian Military District, Krasnoyarsk	Disbanded 1959	Formed 1957.
75th Motor Rifle Division	7th Guards Army, Transcaucasian Military District, Nakhichevan	KGB control 1989–91, disbanded 1992	75th Rifle Division
77th Guards Motor Rifle Division	26th Army Corps, Leningrad Military District, Arkhangelsk	1989, converted to coastal defence division, 1991 disbanded	77th Guards Rifle Division, June 1957
78th Motor Rifle Division	Ural Military District, Chebarkul	Converted to District Training Centre, then reduced to storage base	417th Rifle Division
79th Motor Rifle Division	51st Army, Far Eastern Military District, Leonidovo	Disbanded 1994.	
80th Guards Training Motor Rifle Division	Turkestan Military District, Otar	Became part of Kazakh armed forces	80th Guards Rifle Division (WW2). 90 Gds MRD 1957 (16 Gds MD); 1962 90 Gds Training MRD; 1965 80 Gds Training MRD.
81st Guards Krasnograd Motor Rifle Division	5th Army, Far Eastern Military District, Bikin	Reduced to brigade 2009	81st Guards Rifle Division, converted to MRD in Bucharest, 1957.
82nd Motor Rifle Division	34th Army Corps, North Caucasus Military District, Volgograd	Storage Base 1990; upgraded to division 1992; Disbanded 1993	Formed 1969 from 266 MRD cadres at Volgograd
83rd Guards Motor Rifle Division	13th Army, Carpathian Military District, Rovno	Disbanded 1959	8th Guards Cavalry Division (10 Gds MD)
84th Motor Rifle Division	36th Army Corps, Turkestan Military District, Ashkabad	Became part of Turkmenistan's armed forces	Formed 1981 from 58 MRD cadre
85th Motor Rifle Division	Siberian Military District, Novosibirsk	Brigade 2009	85th MRD 1957 < to 1955 85th Rifle Division. Formed Novosibirsk 1957.
86th Guards Motor Rifle Division	14th Guards Army, Odessa Military District, Beltsy	1.12.89 renamed 5381st Equipment Storage Base.	86th Guards Rifle Division. Formed Beltsy 1957.
88th Motor Rifle Division	36th Army Corps, Turkestan Military District, Kushka	Became part of Turkmenistan's armed forces	Formed 1980 from elements of 5 GMRD
91st Motor Rifle Division	29th Army, Transbaikal Military District, Nizhneudinsk	497 TTC 1987; BKhVT 1989.	Shevi-Gobi, Mongolia, 1979–87;
92nd Guards Training Motor Rifle Division	Odessa Military District, Mykolaiv	150th Guards District Training Center, then Became Ukrainian 92nd District Training Centre	92nd Guards Rifle Division. 34 Guards MRD 1957–60; 34 Guards Training MRD 1960–65.
93rd Guards Motor Rifle Division	Southern Group of Forces, Kecskemét, Hungary	Withdrawn to Ukraine, became part of Ukrainian Ground Forces	93rd GRD
94th Guards Motor Rifle Division	2nd Guards Tank Army, Group of Soviet Forces in Germany, Schwerin	Withdrawn to Yurga, Siberian Military District, became 74th Motor Rifle Brigade	Formed Schwerin 1957 from 94th GRD.
96th Motor Rifle Division	Volga Military District, Kazan	Became storage base, later disbanded	96th Rifle Division
97th Guards Motor Rifle Division	13th Army, Carpathian Military District, Slavuta	Became Ukrainian 97th Mechanized Brigade	97th Guards Rifle Division
99th Motor Rifle Division	25th Army Corps, Far Eastern Military District, Anadyr	Reduced to 3840 Storage Base, 1990 or 1999, storage base disbanded, 2002	Formed 1983–84 from 23 Ind MR Bde.
100th Guards Training Motor Rifle Division	Transcaucasian Military District, Tbilisi	Became 171st District Training Centre in September 1987	Disbanded June 1992. Holm/Feskov 2015
107th Motor Rifle Division	Baltic Military District, Vilnius	Became 18 MRB 1993	Formed 1968 from cadres of 265th MRD
108th Motor Rifle Division	40th Army, Bagram, Afghanistan	Withdrawn to Termez, became part of Uzbek armed forces	360th Rifle Division
111th Motor Rifle Division	6th Army, Leningrad Military District, Sortavala	Became 23rd Base for Storage of Weapons and Equipment 1997	367th Rifle Division
120th Guards Motor Rifle Division	Belorussian Military District, Minsk (Uruchcha)	Became Belarus 120th Guards Mechanised Brigade	120th Guards Rifle Division, September 1943;
121st Motor Rifle Division	5th Army, Far Eastern Military District, Monastyrishche	Became District Training Centre	Formed 1970
122nd Guards Motor Rifle Division	36th Army, Transbaikal Military District, Dauriya	Machine-Gun Artillery Division 1989, Motor Rifle Division 2001; 35th Guards Motor Rifle Brigade 2009	From 5th Guards Tank Corps->Division (I), 29 June 1957.
123rd Guards Motor Rifle Division	5th Army, Far Eastern Military District, Barabash	Became 129 Gds MG Artillery Division 1989; 17 Gds MRD 2001; brigade 2009.	17th Guards Rifle Division
126th Motor Rifle Division	32nd Army Corps, Odessa Military District, Simferopol	Became Ukrainian coastal defence formation (36th Brigade)	126th Rifle Division. Formed 17 April 1957 in Simferopol, Crimean Oblast, as the 101st Motor Rifle Division, from the 28th Mechanised Division. From December 2014 the formation's heritage was taken up by the newly formed Russian 126th Coastal Defence Brigade.
127th Motor Rifle Division	Seventh Guards Army, Transcaucasian Military District, Leninakan	Became Russian 102nd Military Base	261st Rifle Division
128th Guards Motor Rifle Division	38th Army, Carpathian Military District, Mukachevo	Now 128th Mechanized Brigade, part of Ukrainian Ground Forces	128th Guards Mtn Rifle Division
129th Motor Rifle Division	Far Eastern Military District, Knyaz-Volkonka (ru:Князе-Волконское)	Became 392 District Training Centre 1 December 1987	39th Rifle Division
131st Motor Rifle Division	6th Army, Leningrad Military District, Pechenga	By 2005 had become 200th Motor Rifle Brigade	45th Rifle Division (Soviet Union)
134th Motor Rifle Division	Central Asian Military District, Dushanbe	Disbanded 1989	Formed 1980 at Dushanbe
135th Motor Rifle Division	15th Army, Far Eastern Military District, Lesozavodsk	Became Machine-Gun Artillery Division	Formed 1960 as mobilisation division at Lugansk, Kiev MD; became a line division 1968 and moved to Far East.
144th Guards Motor Rifle Division	Baltic Military District, Tallinn	Withdrawn to Yelnya, Moscow Military District, reduced to storage base	29th Guards Rifle Division
145th Motor Rifle Division	31st Army Corps, Transcaucasian Military District, Batumi	Became 12th Military Base	Soviet 89th "Tamanyan" Rifle Division
147th Motor Rifle Division	31st Army Corps, Transcaucasian Military District, Akhalkalaki	Formed from 147 RD at Akhalkalaki 1957. Became 62nd Military Base	
150th Training Motor Rifle Division	Transbaikal Military District, Borzya	Became 213th District Training Centre. Reorganised as the 168th Motor Rifle Brigade September 1994, disbanded 6/1998.	First formed 1973.
155th Motor Rifle Division	32nd Army, Turkestan Military District, Ust-Kamenogorsk	Became part of Kazakh Armed Forces 1992. Activated at Semipalatinsk 1970, to Ust-Kamenogorsk 1984	
157th Motor Rifle Division	32nd Army Corps, Odessa Military District, Feodosiya	Reduced to territorial training centre and then to storage base	
161st Motor Rifle Division	13th Army, Carpathian Military District, Izyaslav	Became part of Ukrainian Ground Forces	161st Rifle Division, briefly 24th Mech Div and 99th MRD until 1965. Formed Izyaslav 1965. Later 161st Mechanised Brigade (Ukraine).
164th Motor Rifle Division	7th Guards Army, Transcaucasian Military District, Yerevan	Some equipment went to Armed Forces of Armenia.	164th Rifle Division, then reorganized as 73rd Mechanised Division and thereafter 121st MRD June 1957 – November 1964.
180th Motor Rifle Division	Odessa Military District, Belgorod-Dnestrovsky	Became Ukrainian 27th Mechanised Brigade after 1992	180th 'Kievskaya' Rifle Division, Second World War
192nd Motor Rifle Division	35th Army, Far Eastern Military District, Blagoveshchensk	Reduced to Motor Rifle Brigade	
197th Motor Rifle Division	Uryupinsk, Volgograd Oblast, North Caucasus Military District	1987 reduced to territorial training centre, then road construction training brigade	Formed June 1966
198th Motor Rifle Division	29th Army, Divizionnaya, Buryat ASSR	Disbanded 1992	First formed 1979
199th Motor Rifle Division	5th Army, Far Eastern Military District, Krasny Kut	Reduced to storage base 1989	Formed 1970
201st Motor Rifle Division	40th Army, Kunduz, Afghanistan	Dushanbe, Tajikistan	Formed 1960 as 124th MRD from an independent mountain rifle regiment, became 201 MRD 1965.
203rd Motor Rifle Division	32nd Army, Turkestan Military District, Karaganda	Reduced to storage base, became part of Kazakh Armed Forces	102nd Motor Rifle Division (1957–1965) was originally formed at Semipalatinsk.
207th Motor Rifle Division	2nd Guards Tank Army, Group of Soviet Forces in Germany, Stendal	Storage Base 1991, Disbanded 1992	207th Rifle Division, formed 1942
213th Motor Rifle Division	Volga Military District, Totskoye	Merged with 27th Guards Motor Rifle Division 1991	Formed 1968
242nd Motor Rifle Division	33rd Army Corps, Siberian Military District, Abakan	Reduced to storage base 1989, disbanded 2009	First Formed Abakan 1972. Reportedly disbanded 1 June 2009, with base area handed over to civilian officials.
245th Motor Rifle Division	29th Army, Transbaikal Military District, Gusinoozyorsk	Storage Base 1997; Guards Motor Rifle Division 2001; disbanded 2005; reformed 2006 as storage base	First formed 1967
254th Motor Rifle Division	Southern Group of Forces, Székesfehérvár, Hungary	Withdrawn to Artemovsk, Ukraine, became Ukrainian Ground Forces mechanised division	254th Rifle Division
265th Motor Rifle Division	Far Eastern Military District, Vozzhaevka	Reduced to storage base 1989, disbanded 1993	265th Rifle Division, 119 MRD 1957 – January 1965. Moved from Vilnius, Lithuanian SSR, in 1968, to Vozzhaevka (Belogorsk-15).
266th Motor Rifle Division	35th Army, Far Eastern Military District, Raychikhinsk/Raichikhinsk	Reduced to storage base 1989, disbanded 1993	266th Rifle Division. 117 MRD 1957 – February 1965.
270th Motor Rifle Division	15th Army, Far Eastern Military District, Komsomolsk-na-Amure	Storage Base 2010	270th Rifle Division
272nd Motor Rifle Division	43rd Army Corps, Far Eastern Military District, Babstovo	Became MG Artillery division 1989; Brigade 1993; MG Artillery division 1997; Brigade 2009	272nd Rifle Division
277th Motor Rifle Division	5th Army, Far Eastern Military District, Sergeyevka	Became 127th MG Artillery Division 1990; Brigade 2009	66th Rifle Division
295th Motor Rifle Division	4th Army, Transcaucasian Military District, Baku (Baku-1?)	Became part of Azerbaijani Land Forces	295th Rifle Division to 1955; 49th RD 1955; 49th Motor Rifle Division 25 June 1957; 295th Motor Rifle Division (November 1964).

=== Mobilisation divisions ===
Division	Location, Status 1990	Location, Status 2006	Origin
16th Motor Rifle Division (mobilisation)	6th Army, Leningrad Military District, Petrozavodsk(Vilga)	Storage Base 1989; Disbanded 1993	Formed 1968
37th Motor Rifle Division	Chernaya Rechka, Leningrad Oblast, 30th Guards Army Corps, Leningrad Military District	Disbanded	Activated 1969, disbanded 1993.
49th Motor Rifle Division	Disbanded 1987	Disbanded	Activated 1978 as mobilization division in 4th Army, Baku, disbanded 1987.
65th Motor Rifle Division (II)	Volga–Urals Military District, Perm	Disbanded	Activated 1967 as mobilization division, became 5078th BKhVT 1989, disbanded 1990
74th Motor Rifle Division	Disbanded 1987		Activated 1968 as mobilization division, Siberian MD, Zheleznogorsk, Krasnoyarsk Krai, disbanded 1987
83rd Motor Rifle Division	13th Army, Lutsk, Carpathian Military District		
84th Motor Rifle Division	Disbanded 1987		Activated 1968 as mobilization division, 28th Army, Grodno, transferred to Maryina Horka with 5th Guards Tank Army 1979, disbanded 1987
87th Motor Rifle Division (mobilisation)	25th Army Corps, Far Eastern Military District, Petropavlovsk-Kamchatsky		Disbanded 1989 Formed 1968 from elements of 22 MRD
89th Motor Rifle Division	13th Guards Army Corps, Tambov	Territorial Training Center 1987, Storage Base 1987, disbanded 1996	activated 1966 as mobilization division
95th Motor Rifle Division	Siberian Military District, Omsk (Stepnoy), Omsk Oblast	Tank storage base 1991, Disbanded 1997	1968–91 as mobilisation division, 1991–1997 as 6295th Central Tank Reserve Base
114th Motor Rifle Division	Turkestan Military District, Samarkand	Disbanded 1987	Activated 1978
115th Motor Rifle Division	26th Army Corps, Leningrad Military District, Ivanteevo	Storage Base 1989, disbanded 1993	Activated 1968
118th Motor Rifle Division	43rd Army Corps, Far Eastern Military District, Birobidzhan	Disbanded 1987	Formed 1970
146th Motor Rifle Division	38th Army, Yarmolyntsi	Territorial Training Center 1987, Storage Base 1989, absorbed 1991 by 6242nd BKhVT	Activated 1981
149th Motor Rifle Division	Moscow Military District, Klintsy	Territorial Training Center 1987, Storage Base 1987, disbanded 1993	Activated 1979
152nd Motor Rifle Division	31st Army Corps, Transcaucasian Military District, Kutaisi	Storage Base 1989, disbanded 1992	Activated 1972
153rd Motor Rifle Division	Baltic Military District, Pabradė	Storage Base 1989, disbanded 1992	Activated 1972 at Vilnius from 597th Motor Rifle Regiment of 107th Motor Rifle Division, moved to Pabradė 1981
156th Motor Rifle Division	12th Army Corps, Novorossiysk	Territorial Training Center 1987, Storage Base 1989, Disbanded 1992	Activated 1968 to replace 73rd Motor Rifle Division, which was transferred to the Far East
163rd Motor Rifle Division	Ural Military District, Belebey	Disbanded 1987	Activated 1975
166th Motor Rifle Division	Volga-Ural Military District, Alkino	Territorial Training Center 1987, disbanded 1989	Activated 1978
167th Motor Rifle Division	33rd Army Corps, Biysk	Territorial Training Center 1987, Storage Base 1989, Disbanded 1992	Activated 1978
168th Motor Rifle Division	Carpathian Military District, Berdychiv	Storage Base 1989, disbanded 1991	Activated 1981
194th Motor Rifle Division	Far Eastern Military District, Svobodny, Amur Oblast	Disbanded 1987	Activated 1976
196th Motor Rifle Division	Moscow Military District, Kursk	Disbanded 1987	Activated 1978
200th Motor Rifle Division	1st Guards Army, Pyriatyn	Territorial Training Center 1987, Weapons and Equipment Storage Base 1989, combined with 7th Guards Tank Division to form 4214th Guards Weapons and Equipment Storage Base	
204th Motor Rifle Division	1st Guards Army, Uman	Territorial Training Center 1987, Weapons and Equipment Storage Base 1989	
208th Motor Rifle Division	14th Guards Army, Beltsy, Moldavian SSR	Disbanded 1987	Activated 1980
209th Motor Rifle Division	Turkestan Military District, Azadbash	Disbanded 1987	Activated 1980
218th Motor Rifle Division	Siberian Military District, Kyzyl	Became BKhVT 1989, disbanded 1993	Activated 1978
225th Motor Rifle Division	13th Guards Army Corps, Mulino	Disbanded 1987	Activated 1978
227th Motor Rifle Division	Siberian Military District, Svetly, Omsk	Disbanded 1987	Activated 1978
248th Motor Rifle Division	Volga-Ural Military District, Sarapul	Territorial Training Center 1987, disbanded 1989	Activated 1978
249th Motor Rifle Division (Reserve)	Volga Military District, Yoshkar-Ola	Disbanded 1987	Activated 1979
251st Motor Rifle Division (Reserve)	Carpathian Military District, Chernivtsi	Disbanded 1987	Activated 1979
252nd Motor Rifle Division (Reserve)	Odessa Military District, Nikolayev	Disbanded 1987	Activated 1979
253rd Motor Rifle Division (Reserve)	Transcaucasus Military District, Tbilisi	Disbanded 1987	Activated 1979
255th Motor Rifle Division (Reserve)	Moscow Military District, Kursk	Disbanded 1987	Activated 1979
256th Motor Rifle Division (Reserve)	Volga Military District, Orenburg	Disbanded 1987	Activated 1979
257th Motor Rifle Division (Reserve)	Ural Military District, Chebarkul	Disbanded 1987	Activated 1979
258th Motor Rifle Division (Reserve)	Belorussian Military District, Grodno	Disbanded 1987	Activated 1979
259th Motor Rifle Division (Reserve)	North Caucasus Military District, Grozny	Disbanded 1987	Activated 1979
260th Motor Rifle Division (Reserve)	Volga-Ural Military District, Shadrinsk	Storage Base 1989, disbanded 1993	Activated 1979
261st Motor Rifle Division (Reserve)	Volga Military District, Omsk	Disbanded 1987	Activated 1980
262nd Motor Rifle Division (Reserve)	Far Eastern Military District, Svobodny	Disbanded 1987	Activated 1981
263rd Motor Rifle Division (Reserve)	Far Eastern Military District, Knyaze-Volkonskoye	Disbanded 1987	Activated 1981
264th Motor Rifle Division (Reserve)	Far Eastern Military District, Ussuriysk	Disbanded 1987	Activated 1981
267th Motor Rifle Division	7th Tank Army, Borisov	Disbanded 1987	Activated 1968
268th Motor Rifle Division	12th Army Corps, Prokhladny	1987 territorial training centre; storage base 1989, disbanded 1992	Mobilisation division formed 1978
269th Motor Rifle Division	Central Asian Military District, Gvardeysky	Disbanded 1987	Activated 1978
271st Motor Rifle Division	Far Eastern Military District, Belogorsk	5230 VKhVT in 1989, disbanded 1992.	Activated 1978. Military Unit Number 11177.
274th Motor Rifle Division	Volga Military District, Kryazh	Disbanded 1987	Activated 1970
275th Motor Rifle Division	13th Army, Isyaslav	Disbanded 1987	Activated 1970. Military Unit Number 20651.
276th Motor Rifle Division	38th Army, Uzhhorod	Disbanded 1987	Activated 1970. Military Unit Number 47113.
278th Motor Rifle Division	Far Eastern Military District, Fevralsk, Amur Oblast	Disbanded 1987	Activated 1981

- 250th Reserve Motor Rifle Division (not listed by Holm)
- 279th Reserve Motor Rifle Division (?)

== Tank divisions ==
Earlier designations of 1989 units include the 27th Guards Tank Division (79 GTD), 33rd Gds TD (15 GTD), and 35th Gds (41st), 10th (1945–57 designation of 34th Tank Division), 15th (later 78th Tank Division).

Tank divisions later reorganised as motor rifle divisions include the 2nd/32nd/66th, which finally became the 277th Motor Rifle Division, and the 61st/13th, which became the 13th Motor Rifle Division in 1957.

Divisions active 1946–59 include the 1st Guards Tank Division (1945–47), 3rd, and the 111th/16th, redesignated as the 16th in 1955 and disbanded in 1957. Heavy tank divisions active 1957–60 include the 5th, and the 17th (1956–60). Divisions active 1945–47 include the 5th (ex 5th Tank Corps), the 11th Tank Division (Gusev, Kaliningrad Oblast), the 18th (1945–47, Gaysin), and the 19th (Ploesti, Romania, and Odesa).

Division	Location, Status 1990	Location, Status 2006	Origins
1st Tank Division	11th Guards Army, Kaliningrad, Baltic MD	Reduced to Tank Brigade 1993; Storage Base 1998, disbanded 2008	1st Tank Corps
2nd Guards Tank Division	39th Army, Mongolia	Withdrawn to Siberia; Reduced to storage base 2001 and disbanded 2005	2nd Tatsinskaya Guards Tank Corps
3rd Guards Tank Division	7th Tank Army, Belorussian Military District, Zaslonovo	Reduced to storage base, disbanded 1989	3rd Guards Tank Corps
3rd Tank Division	25th Army, Far Eastern Military District, Pokrovka	Became 46th Tank Division 1957.	Formed 14 April 1946 from 300th Rifle Division. Disbanded by redesignation 30 April 1957 as 46th Tank Division.
4th Guards Kantemirovskaya Tank Division	Moscow Military District, Naro-Fominsk	Became brigade 2009–2013	4th Guards Tank Corps
5th Guards Tank Division	Transbaikal Military District, Kyakhta	Now part of Siberian Military District; became motor rifle brigade 2009	5th Guards Cavalry Corps
6th Guards Tank Division	28th Army, Belorussian Military District, Grodno	Reorganised as mechanised brigade, became part of the Armed Forces of Belarus	6th Guards Tank Corps
7th Guards Tank Division	3rd Shock Army, Group of Soviet Forces in Germany, Dessau–Rosslau	Reduced to storage base 1990, became part of Armed Forces of Ukraine	7th Guards Tank Corps
8th Guards Tank Division	5th Guards Tank Army, Belorussian Military District, Maryina Horka (Pukhovichi)	Reduced to storage base 1990, became part of Armed Forces of Belarus	8th Guards Tank Corps
9th Tank Division	1st Guards Tank Army, Group of Soviet Forces in Germany, Riesa/Zeithain	Withdrawn to Smolensk, Disbanded in 1992	9th Tank Corps
10th Guards Uralsko-Lvovskaya Tank Division(Volunteers)	3rd Red Banner Army, Group of Soviet Forces in Germany, Altengrabow	Withdrawn to Boguchar, Moscow MD; storage base 2009.	10th Guards Tank Corps
11th Guards Tank Division	1st Guards Tank Army, Group of Soviet Forces in Germany, Dresden	Withdrawn to Slonim, Belarus, became an Armed Forces of Belarus mechanised brigade	11th Guards Tank Corps
12th Guards Tank Division	3rd Shock Army, Group of Soviet Forces in Germany, Neuruppin	Disbanded at Vladikavkaz in 1991	12th Guards Tank Corps
13th Guards Tank Division	Southern Group of Forces, Veszprém, Hungary	Disbanded in 1989	13th Guards Rifle Division
14th Tank Division	North Caucasian MD, Novocherkassk	Became 100th Division of Operational Designation of MVD 1 October 1989; Brigade 2007	Formed 1974
15th Guards Tank Division	Central Group of Forces, Milovice, Czechoslovakia	Disbanded at Chebarkul, Volga-Ural Military District.	15th Guards Cavalry Division
16th Guards Tank Division	2nd Guards Tank Army, Group of Soviet Forces in Germany, Neustrelitz	Withdrawn to Chaykovsky, Volga-Ural MD, reduced to storage base	9th Guard Tank Corps
17th Guards Tank Division	6th Guards Tank Army, Kiev Military District, Krivoy Rog	Became Ukrainian 17th Guards Tank Brigade	20th Guards Rifle Division 1945
19th Guards Tank Division	Southern Group of Forces, Hungary, Esztergom	Withdrawn to Belarus, reduced to storage base	2nd Guards Mechanised Corps
20th Zvenigorodskaya Tank Division	Northern Group of Forces, Żagań, Poland	Disbanded in 1991	20th Tank Corps
21st Guards Tank Division	35th Army, Far Eastern Military District, Belogorsk	probably disbanded 2009; one regiment became brigade	31st Guards Rifle Division
22nd Guards Tank Division	6th Guards Tank Army, Kiev Military District, Cherkaske, Dnipropetrovsk Oblast	Disbanded 1990 to make room for the 93rd Guards Motor Rifle Division	7th Guards Airborne Division became 115th Guards Rifle Division 1945 (Feskov et al. 2013)
23rd Tank Division	8th Tank Army, Carpathian Military District, Ovruch	Reduced to storage base 1990, became part of Ukrainian armed forces	23rd Tank Corps
24th Training Tank Division	Baltic MD, Dobele	Withdrawn to Strugi Krasne, Leningrad MD, as Motor Rifle Brigade	Formed 1957
25th Tank Division	20th Guards Army, Group of Soviet Forces in Germany, Vogelsang	Disbanded 1989	25th Tank Corps
26th Guards Tank Training Division	Moscow Military District, Kovrov	26 GTTD Dec 1979; 467th Guards District Training Centre 14 September 1987	53rd Guards 'Tartus' Red Banner Rifle Division
27th Tank Division	Far Eastern Military District, Zavitinsk	Reduced to storage base	Formed 1969
28th Tank Division	28th Army, Belarus Military District, Slonim	Reduced to equipment base 1990, became part of Belarus armed forces	8th Mechanised Corps
29th Tank Division	5th Guards Tank Army, Belarus Military District, Slutsk	Reduced to storage base 1990	29th Tank Corps
30th Guards Tank Division	8th Tank Army, Carpathian Military District, Novograd-Volinsky	Now 30th Mechanized Brigade (Ukraine)	13th Guards Cavalry Division
31st Tank Division	28th Army Corps, Central Group of Forces, Bruntál	Withdrawn to Moscow MD, amalgamated with another division	31st Tank Corps
32nd Guards Tank Division	20th Guards Army, Group of Soviet Forces in Germany, Jüterbog	Disbanded 1989	116th Guards Rifle Division
34th Tank Division	7th Tank Army, Belorussian Military District, Borisov	Reduced to storage base, became part of Belarus armed forces	10th Tank Corps
37th Guards Tank Division	7th Tank Army, Belorussian Military District, Polotsk	Reduced to storage base, became part of Armed Forces of Belarus	Became 39th Guards Tank Division on 20 May 1957. Originally 37th Guards Rifle Division.
40th Guards Tank Division	11th Guards Army, Baltic Military District, Sovetsk	Reduced in status to become the 10th Guards Tank Brigade on 19 November 1993; renamed the 196th Guards Weapons and Equipment Storage Base in June 1997. The storage base was disbanded itself in 2008.	
41st Guards Tank Division	1st Guards Army, Kiev Military District, Cherkasy	Reduced to equipment storage base 1990, became part of Ukrainian armed forces	41st Guards Rifle Division
42nd Guards Tank Division	6th Guards Tank Army, Kiev Military District, Hvardiiske	Reduced to equipment storage base 1990, disbanded 1991	42nd Guards Rifle Division
44th Tank Training Division	Ural Military District, Kamyshin	Reorganised as district training centre	279th Rifle Division
45th Guards Tank Division	Postavy, Belorussian Military District	Disbanded November 1959	Former 69th Guards Rifle Division, became 70th Guards Mechanised Division after the war, 45 GTD (I Formation) May 1957; disbanded 1959.
45th Guards Tank Training Division	Belorussian Military District, Pechi	Reorganised as 72nd Guards Training Centre, became part of Belarus armed forces	6th Guards Rifle Division
47th Guards Tank Division	1st Guards Tank Army, Group of Soviet Forces in Germany, Hillersleben	Withdrawn to Moscow Military District, amalgamated	47th Guards Rifle Division
48th Guards Tank Training Division	Desna, Kiev Military District	Became 169th District Training Centre, Ukrainian Ground Forces	5th Guards Airborne Division
49th Tank Training Division	Transbaikal Military District, Chita	Became 212th District Training Center	Formed 1967 as 243rd MRD (mobilisation); 1969 became 49th Tank Training Division
50th Tank Division	8th Tank Army, Carpathian Military District, Zhitomir	Territorial Training Center 1987, Reduced to storage base 1989, disbanded 1990	Mobilization unit activated 1969
51st Tank Division	39th Army, Bogandur, Mongolia	Withdrawn and disbanded 1989	Formed 1968
52nd Tank Division	6th Guards Tank Army, Kiev Military District, Zhdanovka	Territorial training center 1987, Storage base 1989, disbanded 1991	Mobilization unit formed 1969
56th Tank Division (Reserve)	Far Eastern Military District, Zavitinsk	Disbanded 1989	Mobilization unit activated 1971
57th Tank Division (Reserve)	Far Eastern Military District, Blagoveshchensk	Disbanded 1989	Mobilization unit activated 1971
58th Tank Division	Krivoy Rog, 6th Guards Tank Army	Territorial Training Center 1987, Storage Base 1989, disbanded 1990	Mobilization unit
60th Tank Division	Dzerzhinsk, 13th Guards Army Corps, Moscow Military District	Disbanded 1990 as storage base	Formed from 60th Rifle Division as 43rd Tank Div 1957, 60th Tank Div 1965. Become 5409 BKhVT 1989, disbanded 1990.
61st Tank Division (Reserve)	Ural Military District, Sverdlovsk	Disbanded 1989	Mobilization unit activated 1972. Another source says that General Vladimir Avanesov commanded this division from July 1985 – November 1986 in the Belorussian Military District. While in this post General Avanesov trained and dispatched officers to help clean up the Chernobyl nuclear accident.
62nd Tank Division (Reserve)	Carpathian Military District, Berdichev	Disbanded 1989	Mobilization unit activated 1972
63rd Tank Division (Reserve)	Ural Military District, Verkhnyaya Pyshma,	Disbanded 1989	Mobilization unit activated 1972
64th Tank Division (Reserve)	Kiev Military District, Chuguyev	Storage Base 1989; disbanded 1991	Mobilization unit activated 1972
65th Tank Division (Reserve)	Moscow Military District, Ryazan	Disbanded 1989	Mobilization unit activated 1972
67th Tank Division (Reserve)	Siberian Military District, Novosibirsk	Disbanded 1993	Mobilization unit activated 1972
68th Tank Division (Reserve)	Siberian Military District; Biysk	Disbanded 1993	Mobilization unit activated 1972
69th Tank Division	Turkestan Military District, Ust-Kamenogorsk	Storage Base 1989; Disbanded 1992	Mobilization unit activated 1972
70th Tank Division (Reserve)	Kiev Military District, Desna (Oster)		
72nd Tank Division	Far Eastern Military District, Varfolomeyevka	Disbanded 1989	Mobilization unit activated 1972
75th Guards Tank Division	Kiev Military District, Chuguyev	Storage base 1989; Disbanded 1990	75th Guards Rifle Division, became 75th Guards Tank Division 1965
76th Tank Division	Belorussian Military District, Brest, 28th Army	Reduced to storage base, 1990	Created 31 October 1968 as a mobilisation division (parent division 50th Guards Motor Rifle Division). 1 December 1987 became 514th Territorial Training Centre, 15 August 1990 became 5356th BKhVT, taken over by Belarus 1993.
77th Tank Division	Lyalichi, Primorskiy Krai, 5th Army, Far Eastern Military District	Reduced to storage base, 1989	Created as 119th Motor Rifle Division (mobilisation), 1976, converted to tank division (mobilisation) 20 January 1982, became 1008th Territorial Training Centre on 1 December 1987, became 5510 BKhVT 1 October 1989, disbanded 1993.
78th Tank Division	Ayaguz, Turkestan Military District	Became part of Kazakh armed forces	78th Rifle Division
79th Guards Tank Division	8th Guards Army, Group of Soviet Forces in Germany, Jena	Disbanded 1992	79th Guards Rifle Division
90th Guards Tank Division	20th Guards Army, Group of Soviet Forces in Germany, Bernau	Withdrawn to Soviet Union; Storage Base 1997; disbanded 2005	6th Guards Mechanised Corps
117th Guards Tank Training Division	Carpathian Military District, Berdychiv	Became 119th District Training Centre of the Ukrainian Ground Forces	111th Guards Rifle Division
193rd Tank Division	Belorussian Military District, Bobruisk-25 (Kiselevich)	Reduced to storage base	193rd Rifle Division, 36th Tank Div 1957–1965.

Mobilisation tank divisions included the 69th (Ust-Kamenogorsk), and the 70th–74th Reserve ("Spare") Tank Divisions.

== Artillery divisions ==
Division	Location, Status 1990	Location, Status 2006	Origin
2nd Guards Artillery Division	Pushkin, Leningrad Military District	disbanded 1993.	Formed on 1 March 1943 from the 4th Artillery Division.
12th Artillery Division	Shelekhov, Transbaikal Military District		
15th Guards Artillery Division	Krasnaya Rechka (Khabarovsk), Far East Military District		
20th Training Artillery Division	Mulino, Moscow Military District	468th District Training Center 1987, disbanded 1994	
26th Artillery Division,	Ternopol, Carpathian Military District (part of 66th Artillery Corps from 1990)		
34th Guards Artillery Division	Potsdam, Group of Soviet Forces in Germany		(formed 25 June 1945 to 9 July 1945 in Germany)
51st Guards Artillery Division	Osipovichi, Belorussian Military District		
55th Artillery Division	Zaporozhia, Odessa Military District		
81st Artillery Division	Vinogradov, Carpathian Military District (part of 66th Artillery Corps from 1990)		
110th Guards Artillery Division	Buinaksk, North Caucasus Military District		
149th Artillery Division	Kaliningrad, Baltic Military District.		

=== Mobilization artillery divisions ===
Division	Location, Status 1990	Location, Status 2006	Origin
67th Artillery Division	Malynivka (Chuhuiv), Kiev Military District; Territorial Training Center 1 December 1987, Equipment Storage Base 1990		
70th Artillery Division	Staryya Darohi, Belorussian Military District		
71st Artillery Division	Zaporizhia, Odessa Military District; Territorial Training Center 1 December 1987, Equipment Storage Base 1989		
72nd Artillery Division	Zhmerynka, Carpathian Military District; Territorial Training Center 1 December 1987; Weapons and Equipment Storage Base 1989		
73rd Artillery Division	Divychky, Kiev Military District; Territorial Training Center 1 December 1987, Equipment Storage Base 1990		
80th Artillery Division	Krupki, Belorussian Military District; 1533rd Weapons and Equipment Storage Base 1989		

== Divisions of the airborne forces ==
Division	Location, Status 1990	Location, Status 2006	Origin
7th Guards Cherkassy Airborne Division	Kaunas, Lithuanian SSR	Novorossisk, Russia	322nd Guards Rifle Regiment (1948)
76th Guards Chernigov Airborne Division	Pskov, RSFSR	Pskov, Russia	76th Guards Rifle Division (1946)
98th Guards Svir Airborne Division	Bolgrad & Kishinev, Moldovan SSR	Ivanovo, Russia	98th Guards Rifle Division (Dec 1943)
103rd Guards Airborne Division	Vitebsk, Belorussian SSR	Reformed as a brigade in Belorussia	103rd Guards Rifle Division
104th Guards Airborne Division	Kirovabad, Azerbaijan SSR	Reformed as a brigade in Russia	11th Guards Airborne Division
105th Guards Vienna Airborne Division	(disbanded 1979)	Dissolved in 1994	12th Guards Airborne Division
106th Guards Tula Airborne Division	Tula, RSFSR	Tula, Russia	16th Guards Airborne Division
242nd District Training Centre of the Airborne Forces	Gaižiūnai/Jonava, Lithuanian SSR	Omsk, Russia	created from the 44th Training Airborne Division, 1987.

== Rear divisions ==
Division	Location, Status 1990	Location, Status 2006	Origin
228th Rear Division (Mobilization)	Moscow, Moscow Military District		
229th Rear Division (Mobilization)	Vologda, Leningrad Military District		
230th Rear Division (Mobilization)	Dobele, Baltic Military District		
231st Rear Division	Minsk, Belorussian Military District		
232nd Rear Division (Mobilization)	Slavuta, Carpathian Military District		
233rd Rear Division (Mobilization)	Khmelnytskyi, Carpathian Military District		
234th Rear Division (Mobilization)	Tiraspol, Odessa Military District		
235th Rear Division (Mobilization)	Artemivsk, Kiev Military District		
238th Rear Division (Mobilization)	Kuybyshev, Volga Military District		
239th Rear Division (Mobilization)	Volgograd, North Caucasus Military District		
240th Rear Division (Mobilization)	Sverdlovsk, Ural Military District		

== Anti-aircraft artillery divisions ==
Division	Location, Status 1990	Location, Status 2006	Origin
61st Anti-Aircraft Artillery Division (Mobilization)	Dzigovka, Kiev Military District	Weapons and Equipment Storage Base 1990	

== Anti-aircraft rocket and artillery divisions ==
Division	Location, Status 1990	Location, Status 2006	Origin
61st Anti-Aircraft and Rocket Artillery Division (Mobilization)	Dzigovtsy, Carpathian Military District, Weapons and Equipment Storage Base 1989	Located in Ukraine	
119th Anti-Aircraft and Rocket Artillery Division (Mobilization)	Zhytomyr, Carpathian Military District, Weapons and Equipment Storage Base 1989	Located in Ukraine	
141st Anti-Aircraft and Rocket Artillery Division (Mobilization)	Cherkasy, Kiev Military District, Territorial Training Center 1987, Weapons and Equipment Storage Base 1989	Located in Ukraine	
182nd Anti-Aircraft and Rocket Artillery Division (Mobilization)	Kryvyi Rih, Kiev Military District, Territorial Training Center 1987, Weapons and Equipment Storage Base 1989	Located in Ukraine	

== Divisions disbanded 1945–89 ==
- Disbanded 1958(?)← 1957 7th MRD<-7th Mech Div <-1946/55← 7th Mech Corps
- 343 (55) Rifle Division 1946–55, 136 MRD 1957, disbanded 1958
- Disbanded 1958←137 MRD 1957 ←345 (57) RD 1946–55
- Disbanded 1959←138 MRD 1957 ←358 (59) RD 1946–55
- Disbanded 1960←139 MRD 1957 ←349 (60) RD 1946–55
- Disbanded 1959←140 MRD 1957 ←374 (70) RD 1946–55
- 34 Ind Motor Rifle Battalion 1962<-71 MRD ←427 MRR 1958 ←376th Mountain Rifle Division ← 48 Ind Rifle Brigade <- 376th Rifle Division
- Disbanded 1960←143 Gds MRD 1957←72G Mech Div 1946(1955) ←110 GRD
- Disbanded 1958 < 144 MRD 1957 < 97th Rifle Division 1946 (1955)

== Divisions of the Air Forces ==
List of aviation divisions that existed in the Soviet Air Forces at the beginning of 1989. It includes military formations of the Long-Range Aviation, Military Transport Aviation, Fighter-Bomber Aviation and Fighter Aviation.

- Notes:
1. The list contains Second World War air divisions, which are the predecessors of the listed formations.
2. The list does not include the 17th Fighter Aviation Division, which, according to some sources, is subordinate to the 73rd Air Army (49th Air Army to 1989) Turkestan Military District, and in others – 12th Independent Air Defence Army.

Division (full name)	Location, Status 1989	Location, Status 2006
1st Guards Bomber Aviation Stalingrad Order of Lenin, twice Red Banner, Orders of Suvorov and Kutuzov Division	26th Air Army BVO; Lida Grodno Oblast; Belarus	During WWII — 226th Assault Aviation Division and 1st Guards Assault Aviation Division. Moved to Yeysk, NCMD, became part of the Russian Air Force
3rd Guards Military Transport Aviation Division	VTA; Polotsk Vitebsk Oblast; BSSR	With the collapse of the Soviet Union in 1992 the 339th Military Transport Aviation Regiment was transferred to the Belarus Air Force and reorganized into the 50th Mixed Air Base at Machulishchi Minsk Oblast. The rest of the division was relocated to Krechevitsy Novgorod Oblast, and in 1996 to Smolensk North Airport.
4th Fighter Aviation Division	14th Air Army PrikVO; Ivano-Frankivsk and Mukachevo Transcarpathian region Ukrainian SSR	Formed in 1951. Became part of Armed Forces of Ukraine. The 114th and 145th Fighter Aviation Regiments were merged into the 114th Tactical Aviation Brigade stationed in Ivano-Frankivsk. The 92nd Fighter Aviation Regiment was relocated to Vasylkiv Air Base near Kyiv and reorganized into 40th Tactical Aviation Brigade.
6th Guards Fighter Aviation Donetsk-Segedskaya Red Banner, Order of Suvorov Division	16th Air Red Banner Army GSVG; Merseburg GDR	In 1991 was redeployed to the 14th Air Army (Soviet Union) in the Carpathian Military District. With the collapse of the USSR went to Ukrainian Armed Forces. Disbanded.
6th Guards Military Transport Aviation Zaporozhye Red Banner, Order of Bogdan Khmelnitsky Division	Military Transport Aviation; Kryvyi Rih, Artsyz, Zaporozhye airfields, Ukraine	After Operation Barbarossa — 6th Guards Assault Aviation Division. Taken over by Ukraine January 1992.
7th Military Transport Aviation Division	Military Transport Aviation; Melitopol, Dzhankoy; Ukrainian SSR	Post-war formation 1965. With the Collapse of the USSR in 1992, it became part of the Ukrainian Armed Forces. The division was disbanded, and its 25th Guards Transport Aviation Regiment reorganized into the 25th Guards Transport Aviation Moscow Brigade in Melitopol. 175th (Melitopol) and 369th (Dzhankoy) Military Transport Aviation Regiments disbanded 1994.
8th Special Purpose Aviation Division	Military Transport Aviation; Chkalovsky Moscow Oblast and Omsk; RSFSR	During the years of WWII – 2nd Special Purpose Aviation Division. Intended to transport members of the government and leadership of the USSR Armed Forces. Location has not changed.
9th Fighter Aviation Division	Moscow Military District; Kubinka Moscow Oblast and Migalovo Kalinin Oblast, RSFSR	Formed 1951. In 1989 the 234th Guards Fighter Aviation Regiment was renamed 234th Guards Mixed Aviation Regiment (parade, ceremonial). In 1992 the 234th Guards Regiment was renamed into the 237th Guards Proskurov Red Banner Order of Kutuzov and Alexander Nevsky Aviation Equipment Display Center. From this moment on, the 9th IAD was disbanded.
10th Fighter Aviation Division	73rd Air Army TurkVO; Ucharal Taldy-Kurgan Oblast Kazakh SSR	Formed 1970. In 1989, it was reorganized into the Training Aviation Centre (TAC) on the basis of the 27th Guards Fighter Aviation Regiment. At the same time, the 134th Fighter-Bomber Aviation Regiment was transferred to the 24th Mixed Aviation Division. Became part of the Armed Forces of Kazakhstan. In 1992 the centre was disbanded.
11th Guards Fighter Aviation Division	36th Air Army; Sarmellek/Tököl, Hungary	Disbanded in 1990. Units of the division were withdrawn to different military districts in the USSR.
12th Military Transport Aviation Division	VTA; Tver, Ivanovo RSFSR	During World War II – 12th Long Range Aviation Division and 12th Bomber Division. Location not changed.
13th Guards Heavy Bomber Aviation Division	46th Air Army Poltava Poltava Oblast Ukraine	13th Guards Bomber Aviation Division during the Second World War. Became part of the Ukrainian Armed Forces. The division was disbanded.
15th Guards Gomel Heavy Bomber Aviation Division	46th Air Army of Long-Range Aviation Ozernoye Zhitomir Oblast Ukraine	After Operation Barbarossa – 15th Guards Bomber Aviation Division. Became part of the Ukrainian Armed Forces. The division was disbanded.
16th Guards Fighter Aviation Division	16th Air Red Banner Army; GSVG Ribnitz-Damgarten GDR	During the years of WWII – 1st Guards Mixed Aviation Division and 16th Guards Fighter Aviation Division. In 1991 withdrawn to Russia airfield Grodno Oblast Belarus. Disbanded in 1992.
18th Guards Military Transport Aviation Taganrog Red Banner, Order of Suvorov and Kutuzov Division	VTA; Panevėžys, Šiauliai; Lithuanian SSR Tartu ESSR	During the Second World War – 270th Bomber Aviation Division and 6th Guards Bomber Aviation Division. With the Collapse of the USSR in 1992, the division's regiments were redeployed to Orenburg, Tver and Shadrinsk RF.
21st Bomber Aviation Division	23rd Air Army; ZabVO; Dzhida Buryat ASSR, Bada, Borzya Chita Oblast RSFSR	Formed 1970. Disbanded in 1993(?).
22nd Guards Heavy Bomber Aviation Division	46th Air Army of Long-Range Aviation Bobruisk Mogilev Oblast Belarus	With the Collapse of the USSR redeployed to Engels air base Saratov Oblast. In 2009 the division was reorganized into the 6950th Guards Aviation Base.
24th Guards Mixed Aviation Dnepropetrovsk Red Banner, Order of Bogdan Khmelnitsky Division	73rd Air Army TurkVO Taldy-Kurgan Taldy-Kurgan Oblast and Nikolaevka Almaty Oblast Kazakh SSR	Formed 1970 during the re-creation of the Central Asian Military District. Honorary regalia and guards rank received in 1990 from the disbanded 11th Guards Fighter Aviation Division withdrawn from the territory of Hungary. After that, its name became 11th guards Mixed Aviation Dnepropetrovsk Red Banner, Order of Bogdan Khmelnitsky division. It became part of the Armed Forces of Kazakhstan and was disbanded into two aviation bases with the same location (600th ab in Nikolaevka and 604th ab in Taldykorgan).
28th Fighter Aviation Division	1st Air Army Far Eastern Military District; Kalinka Khabarovsk Krai RSFSR	Post-war formation 1980. Created on 1 May 1980 with the inclusion of the 41st, 60th, 301st and 302nd Fighter Aviation Regiments. The division was disbanded in 1998.
29th Fighter-Bomber Aviation Division	23rd Air Army; ZabVO; Choibalsan Mongolia	Formed in 1968. In 1993 it was withdrawn and disbanded.
30th fighter-bomber aviation division	23rd Air Army; ZabVO; Tin, Steppe, Chita Oblast RSFSR	Post-war formation 1968. Disbanded in 1990.
31st Heavy Bomber Aviation Division	30th Air Army Long-Range Aviation USSR Air Force Belaya Irkutsk Oblast RSFSR	Post-war formation 1955. In 1994 the 200th Guards Heavy Bomber Aviation Brest Regiment was redeployed from the 22nd Guards TBAD from Republic of Belarus to Belaya airfield. At the same time, both regiments (1225th Heavy Bomber Regt and 1229th Regt) were disbanded within the 31st TBAD itself. Those regiments' personnel were included in the 200th Guards TBAP, which was reorganized in 2009 into the 6953rd Guards Aviation Brest Red Banner Base.. Dislocation has not changed.
32nd Bomber Aviation Red Banner Division	24th Air Army RGK; Starokonstantinov Khmelnitsky Oblast; Ukraine	During World War II – 32nd IAD. Became part of Armed Forces of Ukraine and reorganized into the 7th Tactical Aviation Brigade with the same deployment.
33rd Fighter-Bomber Aviation Khingan Red Banner Division	1st Air Army Far Eastern Military District; Pereyaslavka Khabarovsk Krai RSFSR	Formed in 1982. In 1989 it was disbanded.
34th Fighter-Bomber Aviation Division	73rd Air Army TurkVO; Chirchik UzbSSR; Kizyl-Arvat and Mary TurkSSR	Post-war formed 1951. Became part of Armed Forces of Turkmenistan and Armed Forces of Uzbekistan.
36th Bomber Aviation Division	34th Air Army ZakVO; Didi-Shiraki and Kopitnari Georgian SSR Kirovabad and Kurdamir Azerbaijan SSR	Post-war formed 1951. With the Collapse of the Soviet Union withdrawn to Russia and disbanded.
39th Fighter-Bomber Aviation Division	15th Air Army Baltic Military District; Baltic States	Post-war formation 1978]. With the Collapse of the Soviet Union withdrawn to Russia and disbanded.
55th Heavy Bomber Aviation Division	30th Air Army Long-Range Aviation n.p. Vozdvizhenka Primorsky Krai RSFSR	In 1997 the division was reduced and reorganized into the 444th Heavy Bomber Aviation Berlin Order of Kutuzov and Alexander Nevsky Regiment. In 2009 the regiment was finally disbanded.
56th Bomber Aviation Breslav Red Banner Division	24th Air Army RGK Cherlyany Lviv Oblast Ukraine	After the German Operation Barbarossa – 56th Long-Range Fighter Aviation Division. Became part of the Armed Forces of Ukraine. Division disbanded
73rd Heavy Bomber Aviation Division	30th Air Army Long-Range Aviation Ukrainka Amur Oblast RSFSR	Post-war formation 1955. In 1991 reduced to the 79th Heavy Bomber Aviation Regiment and became part of the 326th Heavy Bomber Aviation Tarnopol Order of Kutuzov Division, redeployed from the territory of Estonia.
79th Heavy Bomber Aviation Division	30th Air Army Long-Range Aviation Soviet Air Forces Chagan Semipalatinsk Oblast Kazakh SSR	Post-war formation 1960. Disbanded in 1995.
119th Fighter Aviation Melitopol Order of Suvorov Division	5th Air Army Odesa Military District; Tiraspol and Marculesti Moldavian Soviet Socialist Republic), Odesa Oblast (Ukraine)	After the German Operation Barbarossa – 265th Fighter Aviation Division. With the collapse of the USSR disbanded and regiments became part of the Armed Forces of Ukraine and Armed Forces of Moldova. In the mid-2000s, the Ukrainian remnant of the division ceased to exist. The Moldovan remnant is a mixed air base in Mărculești.
125th Guards Fighter Aviation Division	16th Air Army GSFG Rechlin-Lärz Airfield	In 1991 withdrawn to Millerovo Rostov Oblast, Russian Federation. The division was disbanded.
126th Fighter Aviation Red Banner Division	16th Air Army GSFG; Zerbst	Post-war formation 1959. In 1992 withdrawn to Shaykovka Kaluga Oblast Russian Federation. Disbanded in 1998.
131st Mixed Aviation Novgorod Red Banner Division	Air Forces of the Central Group of Forces; Milovice Czechoslovakia	During the Second World War – 269th IAD. In 1989, the division was withdrawn to the USSR and disbanded. 114th IAP and 131st IAP were redeployed to Ivano-Frankovsk and together with the 145th IAP 4th Fighter Aviation Division withdrew to Ukrainian Armed Forces. Both regiments were reorganized into one 114th Tactical Aviation Brigade with a deployment in Ivano-Frankivsk.
132nd Bomber Aviation Sevastopol Red Banner Division	4th Air Army Northern Group of Forces Chernyakhovsk Kaliningrad Oblast RSFSR, Tukums Latvian SSR	132nd Bomber Aviation Division during the Second World War. The division, being on the territory of the USSR, was subordinate to the command of the Northern Group of Forces until 12 October 1989. Afterwards it was transferred to the Baltic Fleet Air Forces. With Collapse of the USSR in April 1993 the 688th Bomber Aviation Regiment from the airfield Tukums was withdrawn to Chernyakhovsk. The division was disbanded.
138th Fighter Aviation Pavlograd-Vienna Red Banner, Order of Suvorov Division	24th Air Army RGK; Mirgorod Poltava Oblast Ukrainian SSR	During the Second World Wart – 288th Fighter Aviation Division. Withdrawn to the Armed Forces of Ukraine and reorganized into the 831st Tactical Aviation Brigade with the same deployment.
149th Bomber Aviation Division	4th Air Army Northern Group of Forces, Shprotava, Krzyva and Zagan, Poland	During the Second World War – 149th Fighter Aviation Division Air Defense. With the Collapse of the USSR withdrawn in 1992 to Russia and disbanded.
201st Heavy Bomber Aviation Division	30th Air Army Long-Range Aviation Air Force Engels Saratov region and Mozdok North Ossetian ASSR RSFSR, Priluki Chernigov region Ukrainian SSR	Post-war formation 1954. With Collapse of the USSR went to Russian Air Force except for the 184th Guards Heavy Bomber Aviation Regiment which remained in Priluki.
239th Fighter Aviation Baranovichi Red Banner Division	4th Air Army SGV; Kluczewo Airfield, Chojna and Kołobrzeg; Poland	During World War II – the 239th Fighter Aviation Division. With the Collapse of the USSR withdrawn in 1992 to Russia and disbanded.
283rd Fighter Aviation Kamyshin Red Banner, Order of Suvorov Division	34th Air Army ZakVO; Tskhakaya, Vaziani and Meria GSSR	During the years of WWII – 283rd IAD. During the Collapse of the USSR withdrawn to Russia and disbanded
289th Bomber Aviation Nikopol Red Banner Division	14th Air Army PrikVO; Lutsk Volyn region Ukrainian SSR	During the Second World War – 289th Assault Aviation Division. Withdrew to the Armed Forces of Ukraine. Division disbanded
303rd Fighter-Bomber Aviation Smolensk Red Banner Division	1st Air Army Far Eastern Military District; Ussuriysk Primorsky Krai RSFSR	During the years of WWII – 303rd Fighter Aviation Division. Disbanded in the early 90s
326th Heavy Bomber Aviation Tarnopol Order of Kutuzov Division		

== Divisions of the Internal Troops ==
Division (full name)	Location, 1989	Location, 2006
Independent Motor Rifle Division of the orders of Lenin and the October Revolution, Red Banner Special Purpose Division named after F. E. Dzerzhinsky of the Internal Troops of the Ministry of Internal Affairs	Moscow, Reutov, Balashikha, Noginsk Moscow Oblast RSFSR (the oldest unit of the Internal Troops of the Soviet Union formed on 17 June 1924)	Transformed into ODON Location unchanged
12th Convoy Division	Tula RSFSR (GUVV)	Location has not changed
28th Special Units Division	Division with headquarters in Chelyabinske – deployed on the territory of 4 union republics: KazSSR (Kulsary, Shevchenko, Ust-Kamenogorsk, Semipalatinsk); UzSSR (Zarafshan, Mubarek); TaSSR (Taboshar) and RSFSR (Astrakhan, Cheboksary, Orenburg, Chapaevsk); Office of special units of the GUVV. The youngest unit of the Internal Troops of the Soviet Union, formed in 1990	Disintegration of the USSR out of 17 brigades, regiments and battalions: 10 withdrew to RF, 2 withdrew to Uzbekistan, 1 withdrew to Tajikistan, 4 withdrew to Kazakhstan.
42nd Convoy Division	Vilnius Lithuanian SSR (North-Western Internal Affairs)	Disbanded
43rd Convoy Division	Minsk Belarusian SSR (GUVV)	With the collapse of the USSR, of 15 regiments and battalions: 13 went to Belarus, 2 went to Russia
54th Convoy Division	Rostov-on-Don RSFSR (UVV for the North Caucasus and Transcaucasia)	Reorganized in 1992 into the 54th Division VV MVD RF.
67th Convoy Division	Arkhangelsk RSFSR (UVV MVD for the North-Western Zone)	Established 1968. Disbanded
78th Convoy Division	Tyumen RSFSR (UVV MVD for the Urals)	Disbanded
79th Convoy Division	Kirov Kirov region RSFSR (UVV MVD for the Volga-Vyatka zone)	changed. Reorganized into a division of the Russian VV.
80th Convoy Division	Kuibyshev Kuibyshev region RSFSR (UVV MIA for the Volga-Vyatka zone)	Reorganized in 1999 into the 35th Independent Brigade of VV
83rd Convoy Division	Syktyvkar Komi ASSR RSFSR (UVV MVD for the North-West zone)	Reorganized in 1995 into the 105th Independent Brigade VV
84th Convoy Division	Perm Perm Oblast RSFSR (UVV MVD for the Urals)	Reorganized into the 104th Independent brigade of VV
86th Convoy Division	Karaganda Kazakh SSR (UVV in Central Asia and Kazakhstan)	With the Disintegration of the USSR 18 regiments and battalions: 2 withdrew to Kyrgyzstan, the rest of the units withdrew to Kazakhstan
88th Convoy Division	Tashkent Uzbek SSR (UVV in Central Asia and Kazakhstan)	With Disintegration of the USSR of 14 regiments and battalions: 8 withdrew to Uzbekistan, 1 withdrew to Kyrgyzstan, 2 Turkmenistan, 2 Tajikistan; 1 regiment withdrew from Kazakhstan
90th Convoy Division	Kemerovo RSFSR (UVV MVD for Western Siberia)	Reorganized into the 41st Independent Brigade of VV
91st Convoy Division	Irkutsk RSFSR (UVV for the Far East and Eastern Siberia)	Reorganized in 1998 into the 42nd Separate Brigade of VV
92nd Convoy Division	Khabarovsk RSFSR (UVV for the Far East and Eastern Siberia)	Disbanded in 2003
93rd Division of the Order of the Red Star Special Forces Command	Ozersk Chelyabinsk Region RSFSR (UCH GUVV)	Location has not changed.
94th Order of the Red Star Division of the Special Forces	Sarov Gorky Region RSFSR (USCH GUVV)| |Location has not changed	
95th Division of the Directorate of Special Forces	Moscow RSFSR (USCH GUVV)	Location has not changed
96th Division of the Directorate of Special Forces	Novouralsk Sverdlovsk Region RSFSR (UCH GUVV)	Dislocation has not changed
97th Division of the Directorate of Special Forces	Novosibirsk RSFSR (USCH GUVV)	Dislocation has not changed
98th division of the command of special units	Seversk Tomsk Region RSFSR (USCH GUVV)	Dislocation has not changed
100th Operational Division	Novocherkassk RSFSR (UVV in the North Caucasus and Transcaucasia). Created on the basis of the 14th Tank Division (1974 formation) SKVO 1 October 1989.	In 2006, it was reorganized into the 50th Separate Operational Brigade.
101st escort division	Chelyabinsk RSFSR (UVV MVD for the Urals)	Reorganized in 1999 into the 36th separate brigade of VV
102nd Convoy Division	Krasnoyarsk RSFSR (UVV MVD for Western Siberia)	Disbanded in 1996
103rd Division of the Directorate of Special Forces	Khabarovsk RSFSR (UVV MVD for the Far East and Eastern Siberia)	Protection unit Transbaikal Railway and Far Eastern Railways. Disbanded in 1996
104th Division of the Directorate of Special Forces	Tynda Amur Region RSFSR (UVV MVD for the Far East and Eastern Siberia)	Protection unit Baikal-Amur Mainline. Reorganized in 1998 into the 43rd separate brigade of VV
152nd Convoy Division	Sverdlovsk RSFSR (UVV MVD for the Urals)	Disbanded

== See also ==
- List of armies of the Soviet Union 1991

== See also ==
- List of Soviet Union divisions 1917–1945
- List of Soviet military sites in Germany
- ru:Список армий Вооружённых Сил СССР (1989—1991)
