= 199 =

199 may also refer to:

- 199 (number)
- AD 199
- 199 BC
- 199 (New Jersey bus)
- FIPS 199
- 199 Byblis
- UFC 199
- Jordan 199
- Lectionary 199
- NGC 199

== See also ==
- 199th (disambiguation)
