= 199th Regiment =

199th Regiment may refer to:

- 199th Infantry Regiment (United States)
- 199th Pennsylvania Infantry Regiment, a regiment in the Union Army during the American Civil War

== See also ==
- 199th Division (disambiguation)
- 199th (disambiguation)
