= Krasny Kut =

Krasny Kut (Russian: Красный Кут) is the name of several inhabited localities in Russia.

== Urban localities ==
- Krasny Kut, Saratov Oblast, a town in Krasnokutsky District of Saratov Oblast

== Rural localities ==
- Krasny Kut, Krasnodar Krai, a khutor in Krasnokutsky Rural Okrug of Mostovsky District of Krasnodar Krai
- Krasny Kut, Kursk Oblast, a khutor in Panikinsky Selsoviet of Medvensky District of Kursk Oblast
- Krasny Kut, Novosibirsk Oblast, a village in Kupinsky District of Novosibirsk Oblast
- Krasny Kut, Primorsky Krai, a selo in Spassky District of Primorsky Krai
- Krasny Kut, Oktyabrsky District, Rostov Oblast, a khutor in Krasnokutskoye Rural Settlement of Oktyabrsky District of Rostov Oblast
- Krasny Kut, Vesyolovsky District, Rostov Oblast, a khutor in Pozdneyevskoye Rural Settlement of Vesyolovsky District of Rostov Oblast
