= 199th Brigade =

199th Brigade may refer to:

- 199th Motorized Infantry Brigade, People's Republic of China
- 199th (Manchester) Brigade, United Kingdom
- 199th Infantry Brigade (United States)

== See also ==
- 199th Division (disambiguation)
- 199th Regiment (disambiguation)
