= List of armies of the Soviet Union 1991 =

List of armies of the Armed Forces of the USSR (1989–1991) – list of armies part of Soviet Armed Forces as of 1989–1991 and their status in the Former Soviet Union as of 2018.

- Note:
1. Due to inconsistencies in various sources, the list may contain inaccuracies;
2. A dash in the column "Predecessor" means that the army was a newly created formation;
3. A dash in the column "1992 Transfer to jurisdiction" means that the army was disbanded without being under the jurisdiction of any of the former USSR states;
4. In all sections in the column "Year of creation" the year in which the formation received the given full name is indicated;

== Soviet Ground Forces ==
Conventional flag Ground Forces USSR Armed Forces

This section includes armies subordinated to the Commander-in-Chief of the Ground Forces.

=== Combined arms armies ===
Complete list of the combined arms armies (21 formations) that existed in the Ground Forces in the period from 1989 to 1991.

- Note:
1. Guards – Guards;
2. MSD – motorized rifle division;
3. pulad – machine gun-artillery division;
4. td – tank division;
5. UR – fortified area.

Army	Year of creation	Predecessor	Higher Headquarters, Location 1989–1991	Divisions and fortified areas	1992 Transition under jurisdiction	Reformation, change of control location, state on 2018
1st Guards Combined Arms Red Banner Army	1968	1st Separate Combined Arms Army	KVO, Chernihiv, Chernihiv Oblast, Ukraine	Six divisions	Ukraine	HQ 1st Guards Combined Arms Army was reorganized in 1992 into HQ 1st Army Corps. In 1996 the corps was disbanded.
3rd Combined Arms Red Banner Army	1954	3rd Shock Army	GSFG, Magdeburg, East Germany	Four tank divisions	—	The Army HQ was relocated to Khabarovsk and disbanded in March 1992.
4th Combined Arms Red Banner Army	1944	34th Army	Transcaucasus Military District, Baku, AzSSR	Five MRDs (one mobilization)	—	In August 1992, the Army Headquarters was disbanded.
5th Combined Arms Red Banner Army	1941	—	Far Eastern Military District, Ussuriysk, Primorsky Krai, RSFSR	Five divisions, five fortified regions	Russia	The command location has not changed.
6th Combined Arms Red Banner Army	1952	31st Rifle Corps	LenVO; Petrozavodsk	Six motor rifle divisions (three mobilization)	Russia	In 1998, the Army was disbanded.
7th Guards Combined Arms Red Banner Army	1943	64th Army	Yerevan, Transcaucasus Military District	Three motor rifle divisions, two fortified regions	—	In August 1992 HQ 7th Guards Army was disbanded.
8th Guards Combined Arms Army of the Order of Lenin	1943	62nd Army	GSFG, Nohra, Germany	Three motor rifle divisions, one tank division	Russia	HQ 8th Guards Army was moved in 1993 to Volgograd and reorganized into the 8th Army Corps.
11th Guards Combined Arms Red Banner Army	1943	16th Army	PribVO , Kaliningrad, RSFSR	Five divisions	Russia	In 1997, the army was reorganized into the Ground and Coastal Forces of the Baltic Fleet. In April 2016, 11th Army Corps was created as part of the Baltic Fleet. Location has not changed.
13th Combined Arms Red Banner Army	1941	—	Rivne, Rivne Oblast, Ukraine, Carpathian Military District	Five motor rifle divisions	Ukraine	Reduced to an army corps. In November 2013, the Corps HQ was reorganized into Operational Command West. The location has not changed
14th Guards Combined Arms Red Banner Army	1956	10th Guards Rifle Corps	Tiraspol, Molova	Five divisions (some mobilisation)	Russia	In April 1995, the Army HQ was reorganized into the Operational Group of Russian Forces in Transnistria. Location has not changed.
15th Combined Arms Army	April 1953	HQ Far Eastern Military District (I)	Khabarovsk, Khabarovsk Territory, RSFSR	Four Motor Rifle Divisions, two Fortified Regions	Russia	In the early 1990s, the 15th Army was reduced into the 43rd Army Corps.
20th Guards Combined Arms Red Banner Army	1957	4th Guards Mechanized Army	GSFG, Eberswalde, Germany	Three tank divisions, one motor rifle division	Russia	HQ 20th Guards Combined Arms Army was relocated in 1993 to Voronezh.
22nd Guards Combined Arms Army	1990	13th Guards Army Corps	Moscow Military District, Nizhny Novgorod, Nizhny Novgorod Oblast, RSFSR	Three divisions	Russia	In June 2009, HQ 22nd Army was disbanded.
28th Combined Arms Red Banner Army	1942	—	BelVO, Grodno, Grodno Oblast	6th Guards TD; 28th TD; 76th TD; 50th Guards MRD	Belarus	In June 1993, HQ 28th Combined Arms Army was reorganized into the 28th Army Corps. In December 2002, the corps was reorganized into the Western Operational Command.
32nd Combined Arms Army	1971	1st Army Corps	Central Asian -> Turkestan MDs, Semipalatinsk, Kazakhstan	Three motor rifle divisions; 78th Tank Division; 10th Fortified Region	Kazakhstan	In June 1991, the 32nd Combined Arms Army was renamed the 40th Combined Arms Army. On the basis of HQ 40th Army, in April 1993, HQ Kazakh Ground Forces was formed.
35th Combined Arms Army	1969	29th Army Corps	Far Eastern MD, Belogorsk, Amur Region, RSFSR	Five motor rifle divisions One fortified region	Russia	In the early 1990s HQ 35th Army was reorganized into HQ 43rd Army Corps.
36th Combined Arms Army	1976	86th Army Corps	Transbaikal Military District, Borzya, Chita Oblast, RSFSR	Three motor rifle divisions, five fortified regions.	Russia	In June 1989 HQ 36th Army was reorganized into HQ 55th Army Corps, which was disbanded in 1994.
38th Combined Arms Red Banner Army	1942	4th Reserve Army	Carpathian Military District; Ivano-Frankivsk, Ivano-Frankivsk Oblast, Ukraine	Five motor rifle divisions	Ukraine	In January 1992, HQ 38th Combined Arms Army was reorganized into HQ 38th Army Corps. The corps was disbanded in 2003.
39th Combined Arms Army	1970	—	Transbaikal Military District, Ulaanbaatar, Mongolia	Two tank divisions, three motor rifle divisions	Russia	The Army was disbanded in December 1992.
40th Combined Arms Army	1979	—	Turkestan Military District, Kabul, Afghanistan	Three motor rifle divisions 103rd Guards Airborne Division	—	In March 1989, HQ 40th Army was reorganized into HQ 59th Army Corps in Samarkand, which was disbanded in 1992.
51st Combined Arms Army	1977	2nd Army Corps	Far Eastern Military District, Yuzhno-Sakhalinsk, Sakhalin Oblast, RSFSR	18th Machine Gun Artillery Division; 33rd Motor Rifle Division; 79th Motor Rifle Division	Russia	In the early 1990s, the 51st Army was reorganized into 68th Army Corps (Russia).

=== Tank and mechanised armies 1945–91 ===
Initially a list of tank armies that existed in the Ground Forces in the period from 1989 to 1991.

Tank army (full name)	Year of creation	Predecessor	Higher headquarters 1989–1991	Divisions in the army	1992 Transition under jurisdiction	Reformation, change of control location, state on 2018
1st Guards Tank Red Banner Army	1944	1st Tank Army	GSFG, Dresden, East Germany	Two tank divisions, one motor rifle division	Russia	HQ 1st Guards Tank Army was relocated to Smolensk in 1994 and reorganized into HQ 1st Combined Arms Army. In 2014, the army was recreated in Odintsovo, Moscow Oblast.
2nd Guards Tank Red Banner Army	1944	2nd Tank Army	GSVG, Fürstenberg, East Germany	One tank division, three motor rifle divisions	Russia	The army headquarters was relocated to Samara in 1993 and reorganized as HQ 2nd Guards Combined Arms Army.
3rd Guards Tank Army	May 1943	3rd Tank Army	Luckenwalde, East Germany	Three divisions	–	Redesignated 3rd Guards Tank Army on 14 May 1945. Known as 3rd Guards Red Banner Mechanized Army in 1946. Redesignated 18th Guards Army in 1957. Moved to Almaty 1964 as an operations group, briefly reformed as an army 1969, but then used as the basis of HQ SAVO.
5th Guards Tank Red Banner Army	1957	5th Guards Mechanized Army	BelVO, Bobruisk, Mogilev Oblast, BSSR	Three tank divisions, one motor rifle division	Belarus	Became an army corps. Disbanded in 2001
6th Guards Tank Red Banner Army	1957	6th Guards Mechanized Army	KVO, Dnepropetrovsk, Dnipropetrovsk Oblast, Ukraine	Seven tank divisions, several mobilisation	Ukraine	Became an army corps. In November 2013, the Corps Directorate was reorganized into Operational Command "South". The deployment has not changed.
7th Tank Red Banner Army	1957	7th Mechanized Army	Belorussian Military District, Borisov, Minsk Oblast, BSSR	Three tank divisions, one motor rifle division (mobilisation)	Belarus	In August 1993, HQ 7th Tank Army was reduced in status to 7th Army Corps. In 1994, the corps was renamed 65th Army Corps. In December 2001, the 65th Army Corps was reorganized into the North-Western Operational Command. The deployment has not changed.
8th Tank Army of the Red Banner	1957	8th Mechanized Army	PrikVO, Zhytomyr, Zhytomyr Oblast, Ukrainian SSR	23rd TD; 30th Guards. TD; 50th TD	Ukraine	In December 1993, HQ 8th Tank Army was reorganized into the HQ 8th Army Corps. The corps was disbanded in 2015.

== Soviet Air Forces ==
Air armies (18 formations) that existed in the Soviet Air Forces in the period from 1989 to 1991.

- Note: abbreviations
1. adib/apib – fighter-bomber aviation division / fighter-bomber aviation regiment;
2. bad/bap – bomber aviation division / bomber aviation regiment;
3. VVS – air force (as applied to a military district or group of troops);
4. vtap – military transport aviation regiment;
5. tbad – heavy bomber aviation division.
6. uap – training aviation regiment;

Air Army (full name)	Year of creation	Predecessor	High headquarters	Divisions and separate regiments	1992 Transition under jurisdiction	Reformation, change of control location, State on 2018
1st Red Banner Air Army	1957	29th and 54th Air Army	Far Eastern Military District, Khabarovsk, RSFSR	Four aviation divisions, seven separate regiments	Russia	In May in 1998, the 1st Air Army was reorganized into the 11th Air Force and Air Defense Army. The location has not changed
4th Air Army of the Supreme High Command	1968	Air Force Central Group of Forces	Supreme High Command Headquarters, Legnica, Poland	Three divisions, three smaller units	Russia	In August 1992, the 4th Air Army was relocated to Rostov-on-Don. In June 1997, the 4th Air Army was reorganized into the 4th Air and Air Defence Forces Army.
5th Air Army	1988	Air Forces of the Odesa Military District	Odesa Military District, Odesa, Ukraine	119th IAD; Three separate regiments		In August 1992, HQ 5th Air Army department was reorganized into the 5th Aviation Corps department. In 2004, by the merger of 5th Aviation Corps and 60th Air Defense Corps, Air Command South was created. The location has not changed
14th Air Army	1988	VVS PrikVO	PrikVO, Lviv, Ukraine	289th bad 533 -ya iad 48th guards. orap 452nd oshap	Ukraine	In August 1992, the 14th Air Army was reorganized into the 14th Aviation Corps.
16th Red Banner Air Army	1988	Air Force GSFG	GSFG, Wünsdorf, Germany	6th Guards. Iad; 16th Guards. iad 126th iad 105th adib 125th adib 357th oap 368th oap 11th orap 931st guards . detachment 226th sap 239th guards. ovp	Russia	Management of the 16th Air Army in November 1993 was relocated to the settlement. Kubinka of the Moscow Region. In November 1998, it was reorganized into the Directorate of the 16th Combined Aviation Corps. In February 2002, the Directorate of the 16th Corps was reorganized into Directorate of the 16th Air Army. In August 2009, the Directorate of the 16th Air Army was disbanded
17th Air Army	1988	VVS KVO	KVO, Kiev, Ukrainian SSR	105th UAP; 702 th uap 703rd uap 130th uap 288th uap	Ukraine	Disbanded in 1992
23rd Air Army	1988	Air Force of the Transbaikal Military District	ZabVO, Chita, RSFSR	30th adib 246th IAD; 120th IAP; 101st Regt; 125th unit 193rd unit 68th unit	Russia	
24th Air Army of the Reserve of the Main Operational Command	1980	2nd Separate Heavy Bomber Aviation Corps	Long-Range Aviation, Vinnitsa, Ukraine	Two bomber aviation divisions 138th IAD; Three separate brigades/regiments	Ukraine	In March 1992, HQ 24th Air Army was reorganized into HQ Ukrainian Air Force. The location has not changed

== See also ==
- List of Soviet Army divisions 1989–1991
- ru:Список армий Вооружённых Сил СССР (1989—1991)
