= Serhii Chyzhykov =

Ukrainian soldier (born 1966)

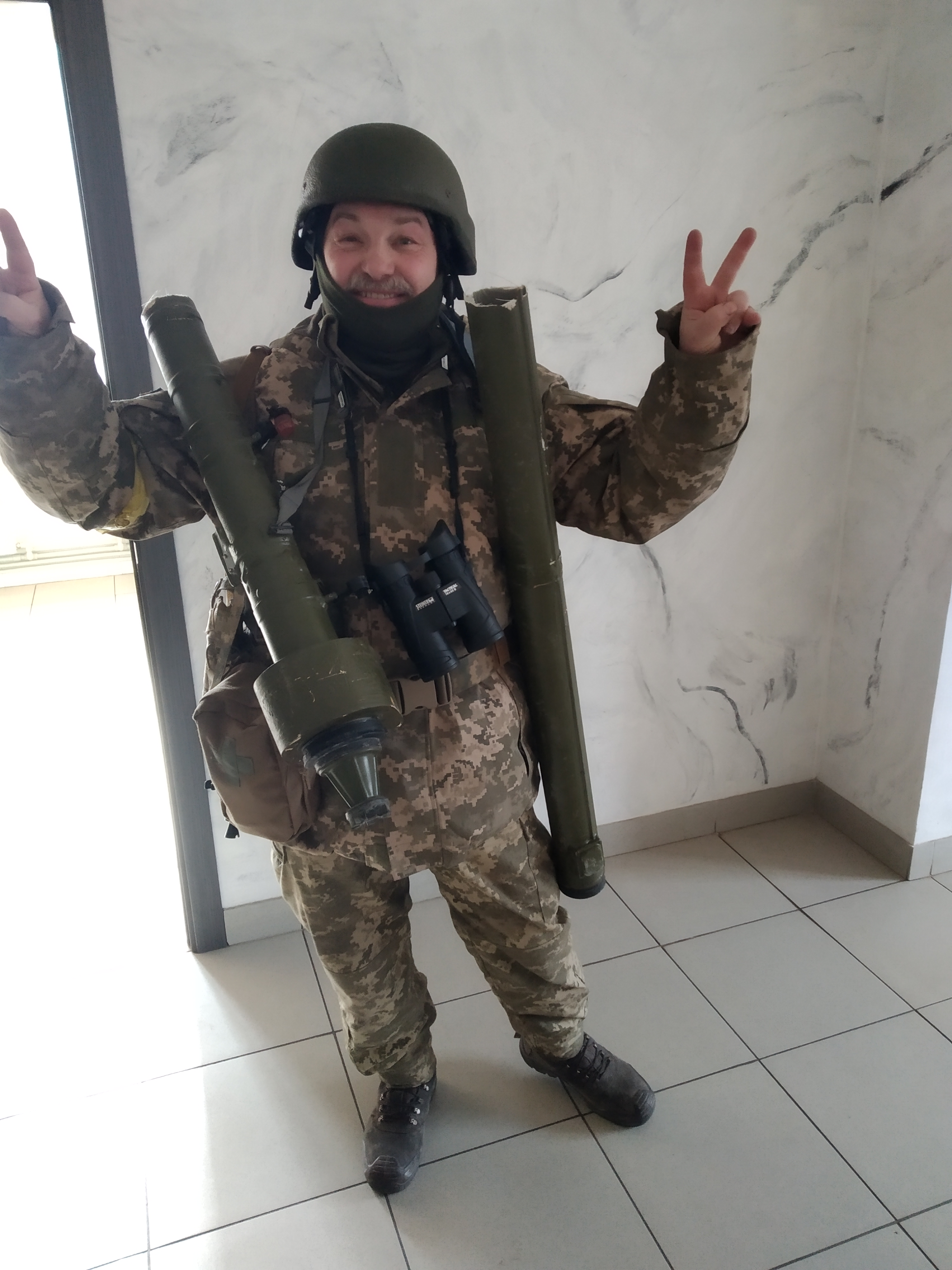

Personal details
- Born: Serhii Hryhorovych Chyzhykov; 22 December 1966 (age 59) Desna, Chernihiv Oblast (now Ukraine)
- Education: Poltava Higher Anti-Aircraft Missile Command School

Military service
- Allegiance: Ukraine
- Branch/service: Armed Forces of Ukraine
- Years of service: 1989—1993, 2014—2015, 2022 — present tense
- Rank: Kapitan
- Battles/wars: Russo-Ukrainian War; War in Donbas; Russian invasion of Ukraine; Siege of Chernihiv
- Awards

Serhii Chyzhykov (Ukrainian: Сергій Григорович Чижиков; born 22 December 1966) is a Ukrainian soldier, captain of the Armed Forces of Ukraine, participant in the Russo-Ukrainian War.

== Biography ==
Serhii Chyzhykov was born on 22 December 1966, in Desna, Chernihiv Oblast (now Ukraine).

In 1989, Chyzhykov graduated from the Poltava Higher Anti-Aircraft Missile Command School.

From 1989 to 1993, he served in the Western Group of Forces (WGF) in various administrative positions. In 1993, he went into the military reserve force. After the demobilization, he earned two higher education degrees with majors in production management and in finance and credit.

From 1995 to 2015, Chyzhykov worked in the banking sector. From 2015 to 2022, he worked as a manager for public sector and municipal enterprise relations at Ukrposhta.

In 2014, following the beginning of the Russo-Ukrainian War, he served in the 1st Tank Brigade. In 2015, he was demobilized.

Chyzhykov served as an instructor in the Veteran Special Training Center "Vovkulaka" in Chernihiv, Ukraine, where he conducted tactical trainings for civilians and military personnel.

On 24 February 2022, following the beginning of Russia’s full-scale invasion of Ukraine, he was mobilized.

On 4 March 2022, during the Battle for Chernihiv, Captain Chyzhykov used a 1985 "Igla-1" MANPADS (man-portable air-defense system), becoming the first person ever to shoot down a modern Russian Su-35 multi-role supermaneuverable fourth-generation fighter jet. The fighter jet, which is worth circa 40-65 million USD, had previously bombarded the civilian areas of the city (3 March 2022), causing the death of 47 civilians.

== Awards ==
- Order of Bohdan Khmelnytsky, 3rd class (13 March 2022)
- "Breastplate 'War Veteran – Participant in Combat Operations'"

== Bibliography ==
- "У Чернігові мобілізований ветеран Чижиков збив російський літак, який бомбив місто. Фото". Novynarnia. 2022-03-04.
- "Менеджер «Укрпошти» збив російський військовий літак над Черніговом". Суспільне Чернігів. 2022-03-05.
- Ксюша Савоскіна (2022-03-07). "«Люди думають, що я листоноша Пєчкін». Історія менеджера «Укрпошти», який збив російський літак над Черніговом". Громадське. Archived from the original on 2022-03-08.
