= UNIT (Ukrainian organisation) =

Scientific and Practical Center "UNIT"
- Науково-Практичний Центр «ЮНІТ»
- Type: NGO
- Location: Kyiv, Ukraine
- Website: http://www.unit.org.ua/

Scientific and Practical Center "UNIT" or SaPC "UNIT" (Ukrainian: Науково-Практичний Центр «ЮНІТ») is a NGO of tactical medicine trainers that originally formed in February 2015 and finally incorporated on March 11, 2016.

== History ==
The team was formed after the instructors training course in February 2015. By 2015 two additional training courses for instructors were conducted. The team consists of doctors of various specialties, military doctors, ATO veterans, civil first aid and tactical training experts, journalists, industrial climbers, professional athletes and coaches, and more. There are representatives of different regions of Ukraine.

Main directions of SaPC "UNIT" are:

- Tactical medicine training for various units of the Armed Forces, National Guard of Ukraine and other law enforcement agencies, specifically to their activities.
- Courses for civilians, who have an increased chance of being in a warzone.
- Education of civilians in the principles of first aid, especially in the ATO zone.
- Training for people in the territory of a remote healthcare system.

== Activity ==
NGO conducted training for civilians and units of various security agencies, the main ones were:

- Training soldiers for 4 and 6 waves of mobilization in the training center "Desna", in Zhytomyr shooting range and on the shooting range "Wide lan".
- Training of the personnel of the 72nd Mechanized Brigade and related units directly in combat positions.
- Combat casualty care trainings for the 8th Separate Special Forces Regiment in the ATO zone.
- Tactical medicine for individual units of the 26 Artillery Brigade.
- Advance training for saninstruktors in the 169th Training Centre.
- Combat care trainings for volunteer battalions and volunteer groups (Chernihiv self-defense, "Donbas", "Right sector"(Chernihiv), "Sich", "Azov″ civic corpus).
- Training of volunteers who visit the ATO zone and military chaplains.
- First aid in the danger zone for civilians, who live on the territory of ATO.
- Trainings on first aid for athletes of extreme sports.

NGO members participated in the creation and testing of Ukrainian hemostatics "Krovospas".

== Gallery ==
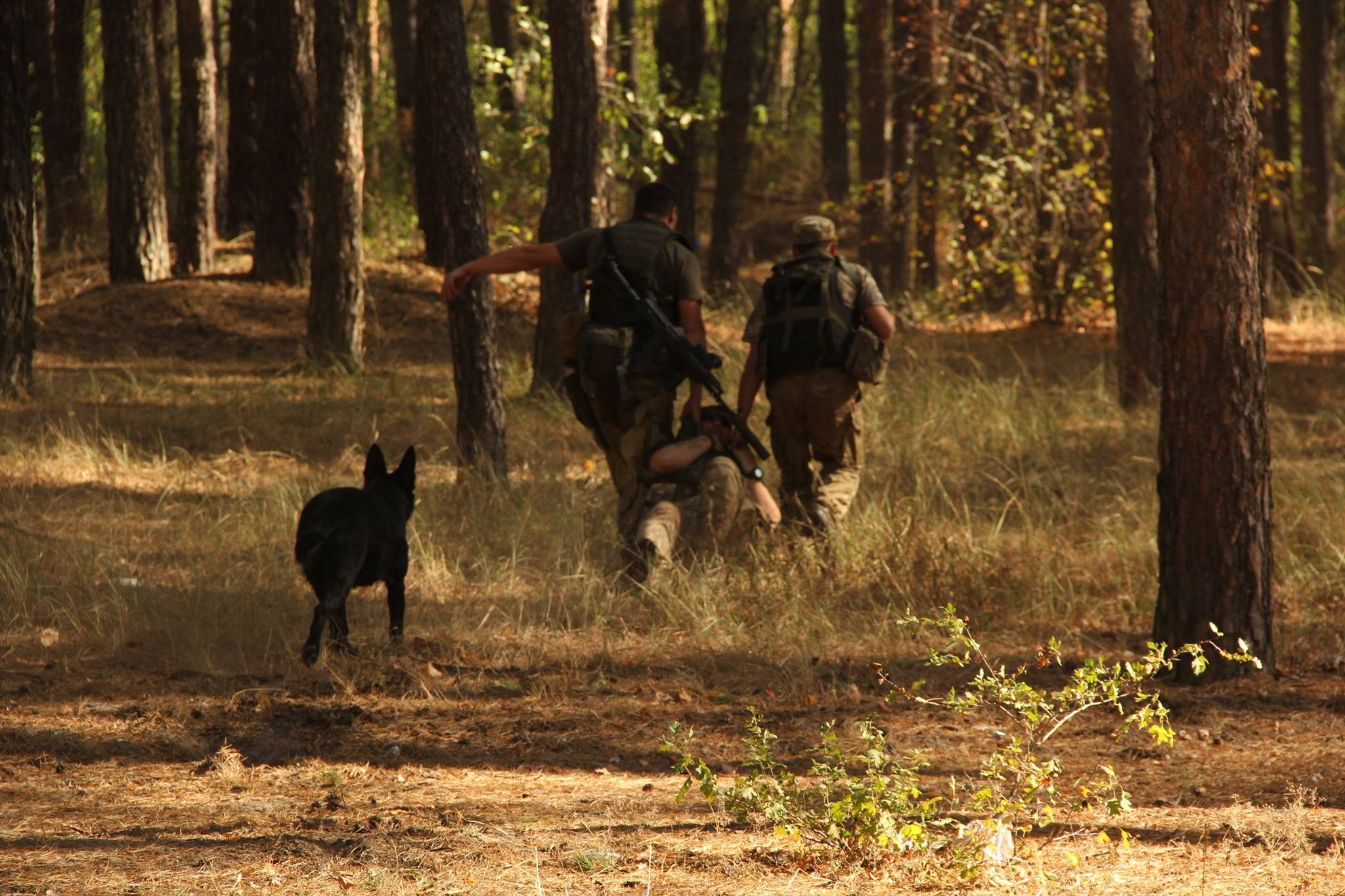
Combat casualty care trainings for the 8th Separate Special Forces Regiment in the ATO zone. Evacuation of wounded in the conventional tactical scenario.
Photo 2015 by Olga Khudetska.

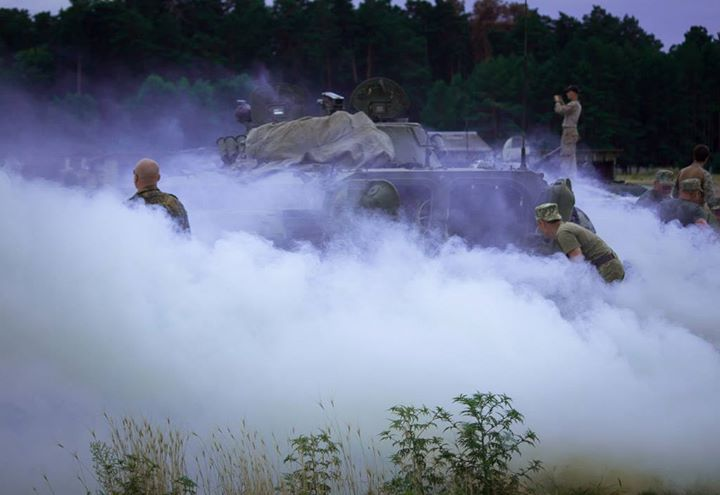
Tactical medicine in the 169th Training Centre.

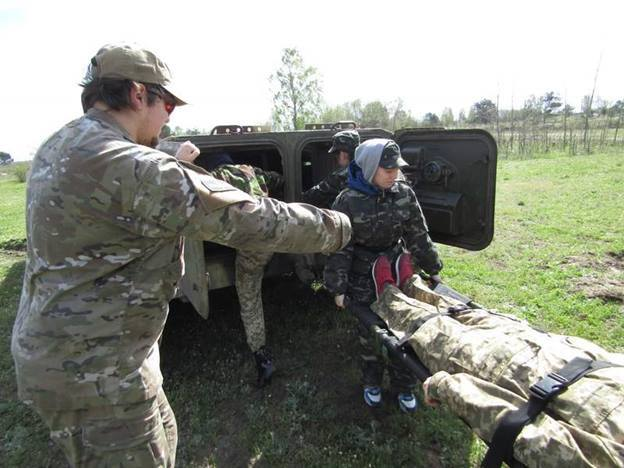
Evacuation using military venicles by Rivne medical college students.

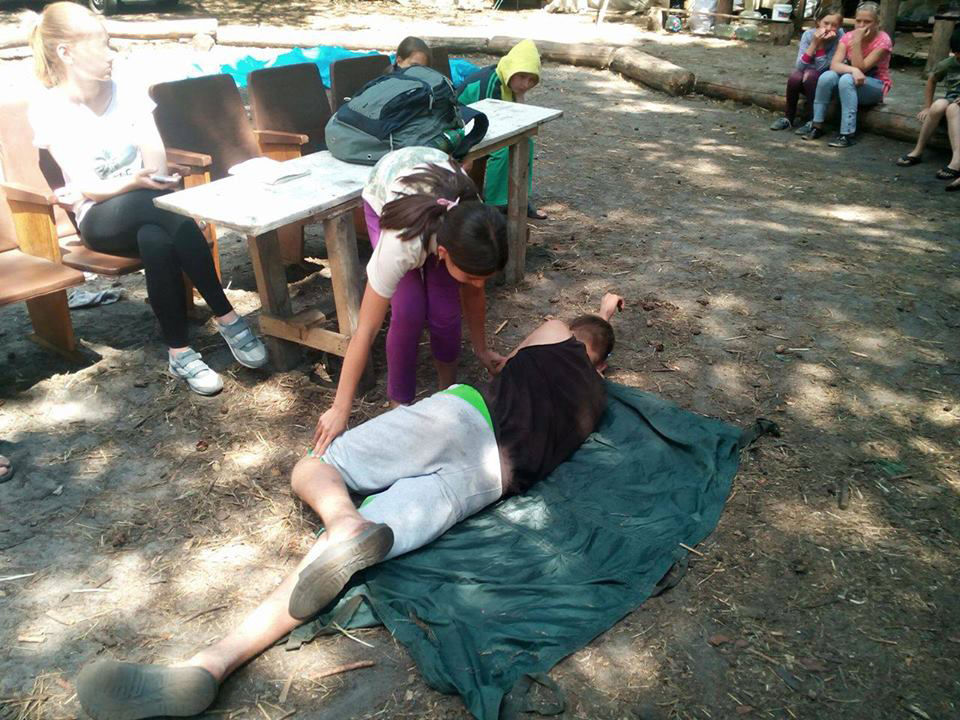
"Trukhanivska Sich - VHF - Kolo.media." camp kids are learning the principles of first aid. Providing recovery position.
