= 199th Division =

199th Division may refer to:

- 199th Division (People's Republic of China)
- 199th Infantry Division (German Empire)
- 199th Infantry Division (Wehrmacht), Germany
- 199th Motor Rifle Division, Soviet Union
- 199th Rifle Division, Soviet Union

== See also ==
- List of military divisions by number
- 199th Brigade (disambiguation)
- 199th Regiment (disambiguation)
- 199th (disambiguation)
