= Spassky District, Primorsky Krai =

Spassky District Спасский район
- District
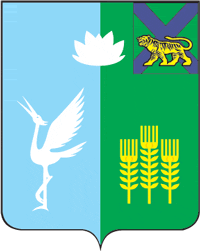
- Flag Coat of arms
- Location of Spassky District in Primorsky Krai
- Coordinates: 44°36′N 132°49′E
- Country: Russia
- Federal subject: Primorsky Krai
- Established: January 4, 1926
- Administrative center: Spassk-Dalny

Area
  - Total: 4,205.98 km^{2} (1,623.94 sq mi)

Population (2010 Census)
  - Total: 30,475
  - Density: 7.2456/km^{2} (18.766/sq mi)
  - Urban: 0%
  - Rural: 100%

Administrative structure
  - Inhabited localities: 40 rural localities

Municipal structure
  - Municipally incorporated as: Spassky Municipal District
  - Municipal divisions: 0 urban settlements, 8 rural settlements
- Time zone: UTC+10 (MSK+7)
- OKTMO ID: 05637000
- Website: http://spasskmr.ru

Spassky District (Russian: Спа́сский райо́н) is an administrative and municipal district (raion), one of the twenty-two in Primorsky Krai, Russia. It is located in the west of the krai. The area of the district is 4,205.98 square kilometers (1,623.94 sq mi). Its administrative center is the town of Spassk-Dalny (which is not administratively a part of the district). Population: 30,475 (2010 Census); 29,570 (2002 Census); 32,653 (1989 Soviet census).

== History ==
The district was established on January 4, 1926. On February 1, 1963, it was transformed into Spassky Rural District, but reverted to the original status on January 12, 1965.

== Administrative and municipal status ==
Within the framework of administrative divisions, Spassky District is one of the twenty-two in the krai. The town of Spassk-Dalny serves as its administrative center, despite being incorporated separately as a town under krai jurisdiction—an administrative unit with the status equal to that of the districts.

As a municipal division, the district is incorporated as Spassky Municipal District. Spassk-Dalny Town Under Krai Jurisdiction is incorporated separately from the district as Spassk-Dalny Urban Okrug.

== Economy ==
The Knorringskoye, or Khankayskoye, deposit of marble is located in the district—one of are only three such deposits in the world. Various souvenirs are produced from this marble.

Spassky District is one of the leading agricultural regions of the krai. Due to the unique microclimate of the Prikhankayskaya Flatland, vegetables, fruits, and berries ripen here earlier than elsewhere in the krai.

Spassk-Dalny Airfield was a longtime Soviet Air Defence Force base in the area, part of the 11th Independent Air Defence Army. It was closed in the late 1990s or 2004-07.

== Notable residents ==
- Valentin Dubinin (born 1946 in Spasskoye), politician
- Roman Yevgenyev (born 1999 in Spasskoye), football player
