= Molova =

Molova Молова
- Village
- Location within Perm Krai Location within Russia
- Coordinates: 59°11′N 54°38′E
- Country: Russia
- Region: Perm Krai
- District: Kudymkarsky District
- Time zone: UTC+5:00

Molova (Russian: Молова) is a rural locality (a village) in Russia. It is located in the Yorgvinskoye Rural Settlement in Kudymkarsky District, Perm Krai. The population was 82 as of 2010.

== Geography ==
Molova is located 25 km north of Kudymkar (the district's administrative centre) by road. Kamashor is the nearest rural locality.
