= Spassk-Dalny =

Town in Primorsky Krai, Russia

Spassk-Dalny Спасск-Дальний
- Town
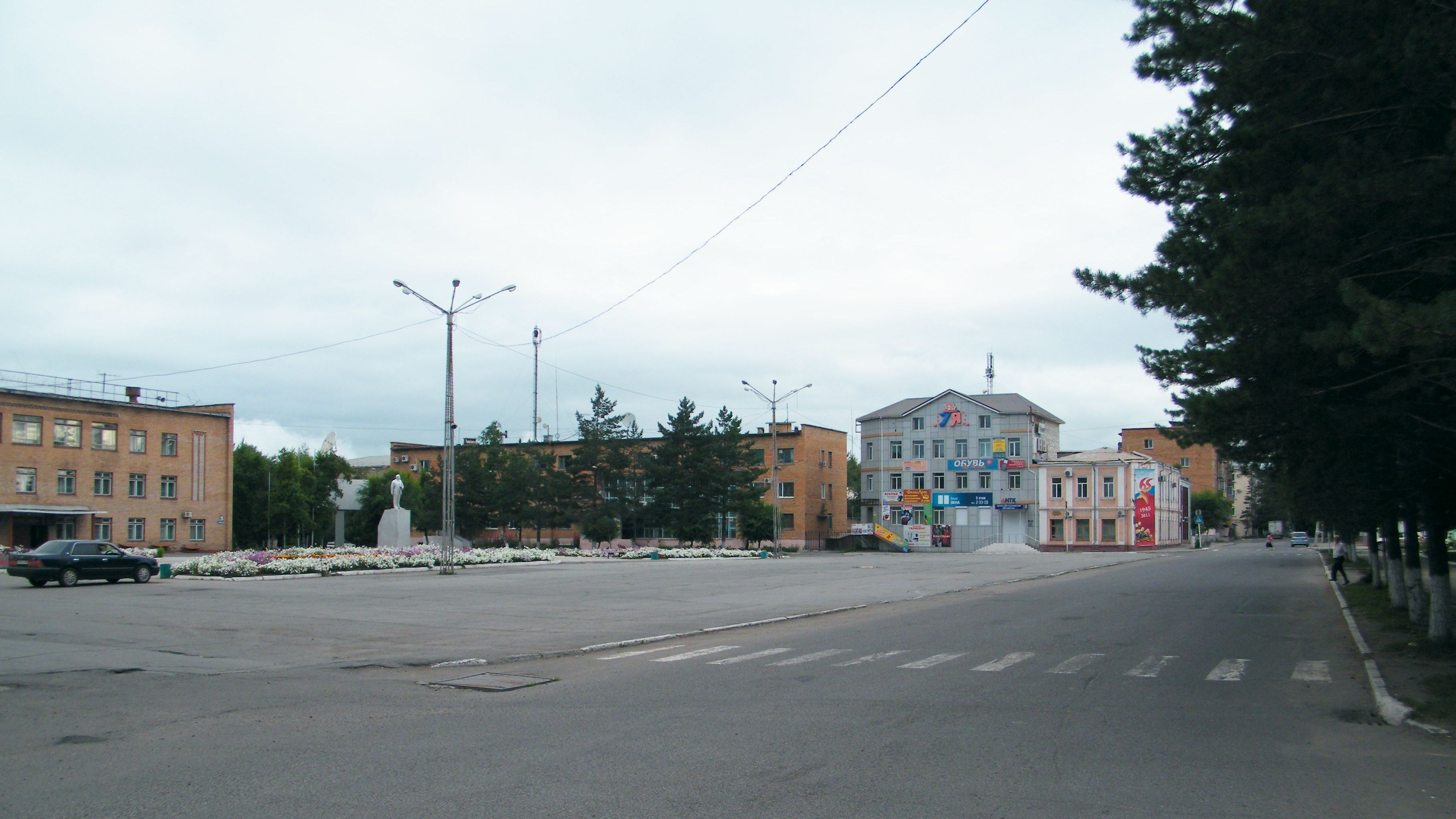
- A street in Spassk-Dalny

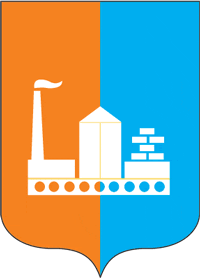
- Coat of arms
- Interactive map of Spassk-Dalny
- Location of Spassk-Dalny Spassk-Dalny (Primorsky Krai)
- Coordinates: 44°36′N 132°49′E
- Country: Russia
- Federal subject: Primorsky Krai
- Founded: 1886
- Town status since: 1917
- Elevation: 100 m (330 ft)

Population (2010 Census)
  - Total: 44,173
  - Estimate (2025): 34,370 (−22.2%)
  - Rank: 357th in 2010

Administrative status
  - Subordinated to: Spassk-Dalny Town Under Krai Jurisdiction
  - Capital of: Spassk-Dalny Town Under Krai Jurisdiction, Spassky District

Municipal status
  - Urban okrug: Spassk-Dalny Urban Okrug
  - Capital of: Spassk-Dalny Urban Okrug, Spassky Municipal District
- Time zone: UTC+10 (MSK+7)
- Postal code: 692245
- Dialing code: +7 42352
- OKTMO ID: 05720000001
- Website: spasskd.ru

Spassk-Dalny (Russian: Спасск-Да́льний), sometimes called simply Spassk, is a town in Primorsky Krai, Russia, situated on the Prikhankayskaya Flatland on the coast of Khanka Lake.

== Geography ==
The relief of the territory is flat, with small hills whose height does not exceed 150–220 meters (490–720 ft). The territory of the town is crossed by the Spassovka and Kuleshovka Rivers (the latter was until 1972 known as the Santakheza).

=== Climate ===
Spassk-Dalny has a warm-summer humid continental climate (Köppen climate classification Dfb), bordering on a monsoon-influenced warm-summer humid continental climate (Köppen climate classification Dwb). similar to the rest of Primorsky Krai. Located quite far inland, winters are somewhat harsher than in coastal areas, whereas summers are very warm, wet and humid. Summers are slightly moderated by its lakeside position compared to areas further north or south. The influences of the East Asian monsoon in summer and the cold and dry Siberian High in winter are very present. As a result, winters are very dry and there is not a lot of reliable snowfall.

Climate data for Spassk-Dalny
Month	Jan	Feb	Mar	Apr	May	Jun	Jul	Aug	Sep	Oct	Nov	Dec	Year
Record high °C (°F)	8.0 (46.4)	12.2 (54.0)	20.0 (68.0)	30.7 (87.3)	32.6 (90.7)	35.5 (95.9)	37.0 (98.6)	36.6 (97.9)	32.1 (89.8)	27.2 (81.0)	21.4 (70.5)	10.4 (50.7)	37.0 (98.6)
Mean daily maximum °C (°F)	−11.4 (11.5)	−7.0 (19.4)	1.1 (34.0)	10.9 (51.6)	18.1 (64.6)	22.4 (72.3)	25.6 (78.1)	25.3 (77.5)	20.4 (68.7)	12.4 (54.3)	1.3 (34.3)	−8.3 (17.1)	9.3 (48.7)
Daily mean °C (°F)	−16.6 (2.1)	−12.3 (9.9)	−3.7 (25.3)	5.3 (41.5)	12.4 (54.3)	17.1 (62.8)	20.8 (69.4)	20.9 (69.6)	15.2 (59.4)	7.0 (44.6)	−3.8 (25.2)	−13.3 (8.1)	4.1 (39.4)
Mean daily minimum °C (°F)	−22.9 (−9.2)	−19.1 (−2.4)	−9.8 (14.4)	−0.1 (31.8)	6.5 (43.7)	12.0 (53.6)	16.4 (61.5)	16.5 (61.7)	9.2 (48.6)	0.7 (33.3)	−9.5 (14.9)	−19.1 (−2.4)	−1.6 (29.1)
Record low °C (°F)	−37.2 (−35.0)	−36.8 (−34.2)	−27.8 (−18.0)	−12.2 (10.0)	−5.9 (21.4)	2.0 (35.6)	5.0 (41.0)	6.3 (43.3)	−2.8 (27.0)	−13.1 (8.4)	−27.3 (−17.1)	−36.1 (−33.0)	−37.2 (−35.0)
Average precipitation mm (inches)	19.6 (0.77)	10.4 (0.41)	27.7 (1.09)	37.1 (1.46)	68.8 (2.71)	94.0 (3.70)	93.2 (3.67)	101.0 (3.98)	71.8 (2.83)	36.0 (1.42)	18.2 (0.72)	12.7 (0.50)	590.5 (23.25)
Average relative humidity (%)	74	69	68	69	73	79	84	82	75	68	66	70	73

== History ==
The first migrants from Ukraine and the western parts of Russia appeared in the area of today's Spassk-Dalny in 1886. They founded the village of Spasskoye, which in 1917 became the town of Spassk-Dalny. During the Russian Civil War, Spassk-Dalny was the arena of hard battles between the White and Red Armies.

== Administrative and municipal status ==
Within the framework of administrative divisions, Spassk-Dalny serves as the administrative center of Spassky District, even though it is not a part of it. As an administrative division, it is incorporated separately as Spassk-Dalny Town Under Krai Jurisdiction—an administrative unit with the status equal to that of the districts. As a municipal division, Spassk-Dalny Town Under Krai Jurisdiction is incorporated as Spassk-Dalny Urban Okrug.

== Economy ==
Historically, Spassk-Dalny formed as the center of the construction industry of the krai, due to the reserves of limestone, clay, and construction sand in its vicinities. Currently the largest enterprise is JSC Spassktsement, which has been operating since 1907 and can produce up to 3.5 million tonnes of cement per year. The cement plant is represented in the town's coat of arms.

Spassk-Dalny has a station on the Trans-Siberian Railway, with passenger trains connecting the town to destinations including Vladivostok, Khabarovsk, and Moscow. The M60 motorway between Khabarovsk and Vladivostok also passes near the town.

For many years during the Cold War, the Soviet Air Forces had an interceptor and reconnaissance base, Spassk-Dalny Airfield near the town. The airfield has been abandoned.

== Culture ==
The town features a museum of local lore and Aurora cinema.

There are over twenty monuments of history and culture in Spassk-Dalny, with more than a half of them devoted to the participants of the Civil War in the Russian Far East who supported the Bolsheviks. There are also monuments connected with the events of World War II.

== Notable residents ==
- Natasha Kurnaeva, vlogger of "Yeah Russia" and "Natasha's Adventures"
- Volodymyr Veremeyev (born 1948), Soviet and Ukrainian footballer
