= Krasny Kut, Kursk Oblast =

Rural locality in Kursk Oblast, Russia

Krasny Kut Красный Кут
- Khutor
- Interactive map of Krasny Kut
- Location of Krasny Kut Krasny Kut (Kursk Oblast)
- Coordinates: 51°24′29″N 36°14′08″E
- Country: Russia
- Federal subject: Kursk Oblast
- Administrative district: Medvensky District
- SelsovietSelsoviet: Panikinsky

Population (2010 Census)
  - Total: 16
  - Estimate (2010): 16 (0%)

Municipal status
  - Municipal district: Medvensky Municipal District
  - Rural settlement: Panikinsky Selsoviet Rural Settlement
- Time zone: UTC+3 (MSK)
- Postal code: 307054
- Dialing code: +7 47146
- OKTMO ID: 38624440111
- Website: panikiss.rkursk.ru

Krasny Kut (Russian: Красный Кут) is a rural locality (a khutor) in Panikinsky Selsoviet Rural Settlement, Medvensky District, Kursk Oblast, Russia. Population: 16 (2010 census); 5 (2002 census);

== Geography ==
The khutor is located on the Medvenka (a.k.a. Medvensky Kolodez) Brook (a left tributary of the Polnaya in the basin of the Seym), 71 km (44 mi) from the Russia–Ukraine border, 34 km (21 mi) south of Kursk, 7 km (4.3 mi) east of the district center – the urban-type settlement Medvenka, 5 km (3.1 mi) from the selsoviet center – Paniki.

Climate

Krasny Kut has a warm-summer humid continental climate (Dfb in the Köppen climate classification).

== Transport ==
Krasny Kut is located 6.5 km (4.0 mi) from the federal route M-2 Crimea Highway (a part of the European route E105), 9 km (5.6 mi) from the road of intermunicipal significance 38H-236 (M2 "Crimea Highway" – Polevaya), 1.5 km (0.93 mi) from the road 38H-237 (M2 "Crimea Highway" – Polny – 38N-236), 1 km (0.62 mi) from the road 38H-239 (38N-237 – Budy), 28.5 km (17.7 mi) from the nearest railway station Ryshkovo (railway line Lgov I — Kursk).

The rural locality is situated 39 km (24 mi) from Kursk Vostochny Airport, 87 km (54 mi) from Belgorod International Airport and 212 km (132 mi) from Voronezh Peter the Great Airport.
