= 199th Motor Rifle Division =

Motor rifle division of the Soviet military

- Active: 1970–1989
- Country: Soviet Union
- Branch: Soviet Army
- Type: Motorized infantry
- Garrison/HQ: Krasny Kut

The 199th Motor Rifle Division was a motorized infantry division of the Soviet Army from 1970 to 1989. The division was based in Krasny Kut, Primorsky Krai and became a storage base in 1989.

== History ==
The division was formed in January 1970 in Krasny Kut, Primorsky Krai. It was subordinated to the 5th Red Banner Army. During the Cold War, the division was maintained at 70% strength. On 1 October 1989, it became the 5506th Weapons and Equipment Storage Base.

== Composition ==
In 1988, the division included the following units. All units were based at Krasny Kut unless noted.

- 526th Motorized Rifle Regiment
- 594th Motorized Rifle Regiment
- 610th Motorized Rifle Regiment (Spassk-Dalny)
- 71st Tank Regiment
- 2183rd Artillery Regiment (Spassk-Dalnyy)
- 426th Anti-Aircraft Missile Regiment
- Separate Missile Battalion
- Separate Anti-Tank Artillery Battalion
- Separate Reconnaissance Battalion
- Separate Engineer-Sapper Battalion
- 1059th Separate Communications Battalion
- Separate Chemical Defence Company
- Separate Equipment Maintenance and Recovery Battalion
- 365th Separate Medical Battalion
- Separate Material Supply Battalion
