= 199th =

199th may refer to:

- 199th (Manchester) Brigade, formation of the British Army during the First World War
- 199th Battalion Duchess of Connaught's Own Irish Rangers, CEF, unit in the Canadian Expeditionary Force during the First World War
- 199th Brigade (People's Republic of China), one of the five maneuver elements of the 26th Group Army in the Jinan Military Region
- 199th Fighter Squadron, unit of the Hawaii Air National Guard 154th Wing located at Joint Base Pearl Harbor-Hickam, Honolulu, Hawaii
- 199th Infantry Brigade (United States), unit of the United States Army
- 199th New York State Legislature, the New York State Senate and the New York State Assembly, from January 1, 2011, to June 24, 2012
- 199th Street (Manhattan)
- National Lampoon The 199th Birthday Book, American humor book that was issued in 1975 in paperback
- Pennsylvania's 199th Representative District

== See also ==
- 199 (number)
- AD 199, the year 199 (CXCIX) of the Julian calendar
- 199 BC
