= Spassk-Dalny Airfield =

Soviet Air Force base

Spassk-Dalny
- IATA: none; ICAO: UWKX

Summary
- Airport type: Military
- Owner: Ministry of Defence
- Operator: N/A
- Location: Spassk-Dalny, Primorsky Krai, Russia
- Built: Unknown
- In use: Unknown
- Elevation AMSL: 344 ft / 105 m
- Coordinates: 44°36′47″N 132°53′13″E

Map
- Location in Primorsky Krai

Runways
Direction	Length		Surface
Direction	ft	m	Surface
04/22	10,008	3,050	Concrete

Spassk-Dalny Airfield, also known in the US intelligence community as Spassk-Dalniy East, was a Soviet Air Force base in Primorsky Krai, Russia located 6 km (4 mi) northeast of Spassk-Dalny, Russia. Spassk-Dalny was primarily a Soviet Air Defence Forces (PVO) interceptor airfield for defending against Western aircraft, with the 821st Fighter Aviation Regiment (11th Independent Air Defence Army) based here. However, the 219th Long-Range Reconnaissance Aviation Regiment of the 30th Air Army, Long Range Aviation was also a tenant during the 1950s and 1960s, operating Tupolev Tu-16 Badger aircraft for intelligence operations around east Asia.

== History ==
In the late 1940s the airfield was populated by the 18th and 51st Brigades of the 27th Air Division.

In the early 1960s Sukhoi Su-7 and Su-9 were based here.

A 1966 satellite overflight spotted 21 Tu-16 Badger, 18 Su-7 Fitter, 21 Yak-28 Firebar, and 2 MiG-15 Fagot at this airfield. The CIA in 1969 identified the Firebar aircraft as the nearest potential threat to SR-71 operations over North Korea. The base's role diminished in the 1970s with the deployment of advanced MiG-25 Foxbat aircraft at Chuguyevka 60 miles (100 km) to the southeast.

In 1985 the CIA reported that Mikoyan-Gurevich MiG-23P (Flogger-G) and the training variant MiG-23U (Flogger-C) were crated at Spassk-Dalny and sent to Cam Ranh Base in Vietnam.

Google Earth imagery in 2005 showed the airfield was already abandoned and by the 2010s that the airfield was being torn up for reclamation of concrete.
