= 30th Air Army =

Military formation of the Soviet Air Forces

The 30th Air Army was a military formation of the Soviet Air Forces, active in two periods.

From 1949 to 1968 the Frontal Aviation forces in the Baltic Military District, formerly the 15th Air Army, were designated the 30th Air Army. The "15th" designation was returned to that Army in 1968.

In 1980 Long Range Aviation was split up into three Air Armies of Strategic Designation, the 30th, 37th, and 46th. The new 30th Air Army VGK SN lasted until it was disbanded in 1994. It supervised the 31st and 55th Heavy Bomber Aviation Divisions.

The 219th Independent Long-Range Reconnaissance Aviation Regiment at Spassk-Dalny Airfield in the Far East formed part of 30 VA from 1980 to 1994.
