= Lectionary 199 =

Lectionary ℓ 199
- New Testament manuscript
- Text: Evamgelistarion
- Date: 13th century
- Script: Greek
- Now at: Bodleian Library
- Size: 28 cm by 22.5 cm

Lectionary 199, designated by siglum ℓ 199 (in the Gregory-Aland numbering) is a Greek manuscript of the New Testament, on parchment. Palaeographically it has been assigned to the 13th century. Scrivener labelled it by 207^{evl}.

== Description ==
The codex contains lessons from the Gospels of John, Matthew, Luke lectionary (Evangelistarium), on 243 parchment leaves (28 cm by 22.5 cm), with lacunae at the beginning and end. The text is written in Greek minuscule letters, in two columns per page, 21-24 lines per page. It contains musical notes. The leaves were bound in disorder. Dean Burgon noted: "A fine ruin, miserably cropped by the modern binder: the writing is very dissimilar in parts".

There are daily lessons from Easter to Pentecost.

== History ==
Gregory dated the manuscript to the 13th century. Today it is dated by the INTF to the 13th century.

The manuscript was added to the list of New Testament manuscripts by Scrivener (number 207) and Gregory (number 199). Gregory saw it in 1883.

The manuscript is not cited in the critical editions of the Greek New Testament (UBS3).

Currently the codex is located in the Bodleian Library (E. D. Clarke 46) at Oxford.

== See also ==
- List of New Testament lectionaries
- Biblical manuscript
- Textual criticism

== Bibliography ==
- Gregory, Caspar René (1900). Textkritik des Neuen Testaments, Vol. 1. Leipzig. p. 403.
