= Kamashor =

Kamashor Камашор
- Village
- Location within Perm Krai Location within Russia
- Coordinates: 59°12′N 54°40′E
- Country: Russia
- Region: Perm Krai
- District: Kudymkarsky District
- Time zone: UTC+5:00

Kamashor (Russian: Камашор) is a rural locality (a village) in Yorgvinskoye Rural Settlement, Kudymkarsky District, Perm Krai, Russia. The population was 45 as of 2010.

== Geography ==
Kamashor is located 25 km north of Kudymkar (the district's administrative centre) by road. Molova is the nearest rural locality.
