= 107th Motor Rifle Division =

Motor rifle division of the Soviet military

107th Motor Rifle Division (1968–1993) 18th Motor Rifle Brigade (1993–1998)
- Active: 1968–1998
- Country: Soviet Union (1968–1991); Russia (1992–1998)
- Branch: Soviet Ground Forces (1968–1991); Russian Ground Forces (1992–1998)
- Type: Motorized infantry
- Garrison/HQ: Solnechnogorsk

The 18th Motor Rifle Brigade was a motorized infantry brigade of the Russian Ground Forces from 1993 to 1998. It was originally formed in Vilnius in the Baltic Military District in 1968 as the 107th Motor Rifle Division. After the dissolution of the Soviet Union, it was withdrawn to Solnechnogorsk and downsized to a brigade.

The division's original Military Unit Number was 22238. This became 40961 from 1993.

== History ==
The 107th Motor Rifle Division was formed on 18 July 1968 in Vilnius, subordinated to the Baltic Military District. It replaced the 265th Motor Rifle Division, which was transferred to the Far East. In 1972, its 597th Motor Rifle Regiment was used to form the 153rd Motor Rifle Division, a mobilization division, and was replaced by the 77th Guards Motor Rifle Regiment of the 26th Guards Motor Rifle Division. During the Cold War, the division was maintained at 15% strength. In January 1993, the division was withdrawn from Vilnius and moved to Solnechnogorsk in the Moscow Military District. In February, it was downsized and became the 18th Separate Motor Rifle Brigade. The brigade was disbanded in June 1998.

== Composition ==
In 1988, the 107th Motor Rifle Division was composed of the following units. All units were based in Vilnius unless noted.

- 77th Guards Motorized Rifle Regiment
- 660th Motorized Rifle Regiment (Ukmerge)
- 664th Motorized Rifle Regiment
- 106th Tank Regiment
- 379th Artillery Regiment
- 384th Anti-Aircraft Missile Regiment (Ukmerge)
- 695th Separate Missile Battalion (Ukmerge)
- 980th Separate Anti-Tank Artillery Battalion
- 640th Separate Reconnaissance Battalion
- 1298th Separate Engineer-Sapper Battalion (Ukmerge)
- 1400th Separate Communications Battalion
- 104th Separate Chemical Defence Company
- 304th Separate Equipment Maintenance and Recovery Battalion
- 401st Separate Medical Battalion (Ukmerge)
- 1029th Separate Material Supply Battalion
