= Desna, Chernihiv Oblast =

Rural locality in Chernihiv Oblast, Ukraine

Desna Десна
- Rural settlement
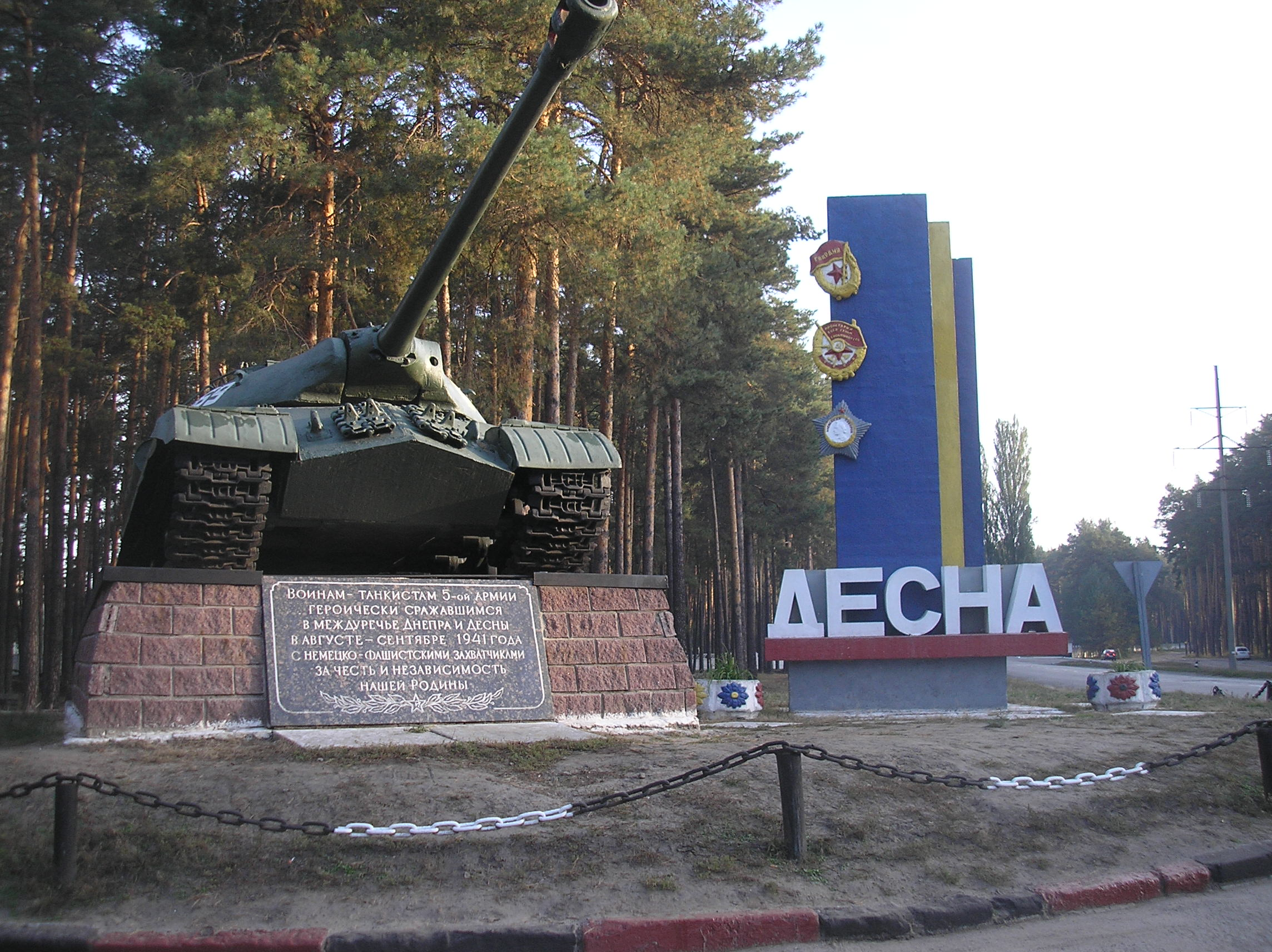
- Town entrance sign

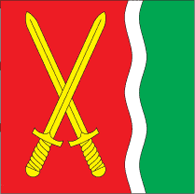
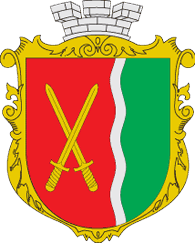
- Flag Coat of arms

- Location of Desna in Chernihiv Oblast Desna (Chernihiv Oblast)
- Coordinates: 50°55′52″N 30°45′25″E
- Country: Ukraine
- Oblast: Chernihiv Oblast
- Raion: Chernihiv Raion
- Town status: 1960

Government
  - Town Head: Yuriy Ostashevskyi

Area
  - Total: 0.08 km^{2} (0.031 sq mi)
- Elevation: 125 m (410 ft)

Population (2022)
  - Total: 7,297
  - Density: 91,000/km^{2} (240,000/sq mi)
- Time zone: UTC+2 (EET)
  - Summer (DST): UTC+3 (EEST)
- Postal code: 17024
- Area code: +380 4646
- Website: http://rada.gov.ua/

Desna (Ukrainian: Десна) is a rural settlement in Chernihiv Raion, Chernihiv Oblast, northern Ukraine. It hosts the administration of Desna settlement hromada, one of the hromadas of Ukraine. The settlement's population was 7,180 as of the 2001 Ukrainian census. Current population: 7,297 (2022 estimate). It is named after the Desna River which flows through the settlement.

The settlement houses a major military training center (169th Training Centre) of the Ukrainian Ground Forces. It was hit by an airstrike by Russian forces on 17 May 2022 during the Russian invasion of Ukraine. On the 25 June, the town was hit with cruise missiles, causing large amounts of damage but no casualties were reported.

== History ==
Until 18 July 2020, Desna belonged to Kozelets Raion. The raion was abolished in July 2020 as part of the administrative reform of Ukraine, which reduced the number of raions of Chernihiv Oblast to five. The area of Kozelets Raion was merged into Chernihiv Raion.

Until 26 January 2024, Desna was designated urban-type settlement. On this day, a new law entered into force which abolished this status, and Desna became a rural settlement.

== Geography ==
The Desna is located in the south of Desna settlement hromada. The village is located between on the right bank the Desna River.

The Desna is located within the Dnieper Lowland. The relief of the surface of the district is a lowland plain.

The climate of Desna is moderately continental, with warm summers and relatively mild winters. The average temperature in January is about -7 °C, and in July - +19 °C. The average annual precipitation ranges from 550 to 660 mm, with the highest precipitation in the summer period.

The most common are sod-podzolic and meadow soils. The Desna is located in the natural zone of mixed forests, in Polissya. The main species in the forests are pine, oak, alder, ash, birch. Minerals – loam, peat, sand.

Desna is located on the territory the Mizhrichynskyi Regional Landscape Park, in which pine forests are protected.
