= AD 199 =

199 in various calendars
- Gregorian calendar: 199; CXCIX
- Ab urbe condita: 952
- Assyrian calendar: 4949
- Balinese saka calendar: 120–121
- Bengali calendar: −395 – −394
- Berber calendar: 1149
- Buddhist calendar: 743
- Burmese calendar: −439
- Byzantine calendar: 5707–5708
- Chinese calendar: 戊寅年 (Earth Tiger); 2896 or 2689 — to — 己卯年 (Earth Rabbit); 2897 or 2690
- Coptic calendar: −85 – −84
- Discordian calendar: 1365
- Ethiopian calendar: 191–192
- Hebrew calendar: 3959–3960
- Hindu calendars
- Vikram Samvat: 255–256
- Shaka Samvat: 120–121
- Kali Yuga: 3299–3300
- Holocene calendar: 10199
- Iranian calendar: 423 BP – 422 BP
- Islamic calendar: 436 BH – 435 BH
- Javanese calendar: 76–77
- Julian calendar: 199; CXCIX
- Korean calendar: 2532
- Minguo calendar: 1713 before ROC 民前1713年
- Nanakshahi calendar: −1269
- Seleucid era: 510/511 AG
- Thai solar calendar: 741–742
- Tibetan calendar: ས་ཕོ་སྟག་ལོ་ (male Earth-Tiger); 325 or −56 or −828 — to — ས་མོ་ཡོས་ལོ་ (female Earth-Hare); 326 or −55 or −827

Year 199 (CXCIX) was a common year starting on Monday of the Julian calendar. At the time, it was sometimes known as year 952 Ab urbe condita. The denomination 199 for this year has been used since the early medieval period, when the Anno Domini calendar era became the prevalent method in Europe for naming years.

== Events ==
=== By place ===
==== Roman Empire ====
- Mesopotamia is partitioned into two Roman provinces divided by the Euphrates, Mesopotamia and Osroene.
- Emperor Septimius Severus lays siege to the city-state Hatra in Central-Mesopotamia, but fails to capture the city despite breaching the walls.
- Two new legions, I Parthica and III Parthica, are formed as a permanent garrison.

==== China ====
- Battle of Yijing: Chinese warlord Yuan Shao defeats Gongsun Zan.

==== Korea ====
- Geodeung succeeds Suro of Geumgwan Gaya, as king of the Korean kingdom of Gaya (traditional date).

=== By topic ===
==== Religion ====
- Pope Zephyrinus succeeds Pope Victor I, as the 15th pope.

== Births ==
Valerian, Roman emperor (d. 264)

== Deaths ==
- February 7
  - Gao Shun, Chinese general and advisor
  - Lü Bu, Chinese general and warlord
  - Chen Gong
- Chen Ji, Chinese official, scholar and politician
- Gongsun Zan, Chinese general and warlord
- Qin Yilu (or Qin Yi), Chinese general
- Suro of Geumgwan Gaya, Korean ruler
- Tian Kai, Chinese official and general
- Yuan Shu, Chinese general and warlord
