= 199 BC =

199 BC in various calendars
- Gregorian calendar: 199 BC; CXCIX BC
- Ab urbe condita: 555
- Ancient Egypt era: XXXIII dynasty, 125
- Pharaoh: Ptolemy V Epiphanes, 5
- Ancient Greek Olympiad (summer): 145th Olympiad, year 2
- Assyrian calendar: 4552
- Balinese saka calendar: N/A
- Bengali calendar: −792 – −791
- Berber calendar: 752
- Buddhist calendar: 346
- Burmese calendar: −836
- Byzantine calendar: 5310–5311
- Chinese calendar: 辛丑年 (Metal Ox); 2499 or 2292 — to — 壬寅年 (Water Tiger); 2500 or 2293
- Coptic calendar: −482 – −481
- Discordian calendar: 968
- Ethiopian calendar: −206 – −205
- Hebrew calendar: 3562–3563
- Hindu calendars
- Vikram Samvat: −142 – −141
- Shaka Samvat: N/A
- Kali Yuga: 2902–2903
- Holocene calendar: 9802
- Iranian calendar: 820 BP – 819 BP
- Islamic calendar: 845 BH – 844 BH
- Javanese calendar: N/A
- Julian calendar: N/A
- Korean calendar: 2135
- Minguo calendar: 2110 before ROC 民前2110年
- Nanakshahi calendar: −1666
- Seleucid era: 113/114 AG
- Thai solar calendar: 344–345
- Tibetan calendar: ལྕགས་མོ་གླང་ལོ་ (female Iron-Ox) −72 or −453 or −1225 — to — ཆུ་ཕོ་སྟག་ལོ་ (male Water-Tiger) −71 or −452 or −1224

Year 199 BC was a year of the pre-Julian Roman calendar. At the time it was known as the Year of the Consulship of Lentulus and Tappulus (or, less frequently, year 555 Ab urbe condita). The denomination 199 BC for this year has been used since the early medieval period, when the Anno Domini calendar era became the prevalent method in Europe for naming years.

== Events ==
=== By place ===
==== Roman Republic ====
- The Roman general Gnaeus Baebius Tamphilus attacks the Insubres in Gaul, but loses over 6,700 soldiers in the process.
- Scipio Africanus becomes censor and princeps Senatus (the titular head of the Roman Senate).
- The Roman law, Lex Porcia, is proposed by the tribune P. Porcius Laeca to give Roman citizens in Italy and provinces the right of appeal in capital cases.

==== Egypt ====
- Ancient Egyptian Pharaoh Ankhwennefer succeeds Horwennefer in Upper Egypt, Egypt.

== Births ==
Maddicus H. Jarcobian: Born January 22, 199 BC, @ 1am Celestial Time
