= 169th Training Centre (Ukraine) =

169th Training Center (KMD, Dec 1987 – 1992) 169th Training Center (UGF, 1992–present)
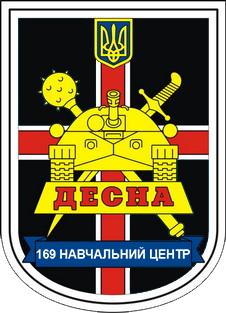
- Active: 1 Dec 1987 – present (as 169th Training Centre)
- Country: Soviet Union (Dec 1942 – 1992); Ukraine (1992–present)
- Branch: Ukrainian Ground Forces
- Role: Desna town administration Military education and training
- Size: Division
- Garrison/HQ: Desna, Chernihiv Raion, Chernihiv Oblast, Ukraine

The 169th Training Centre is a military education and training division sized formation of the Ukrainian Ground Forces. The Training Centre's main task is to prepare young professionals and personnel under contract to the Army Forces of Ukraine.

== Historical background ==
=== Soviet period ===
==== 5th Guards Airborne Division ====
The 169th Training Centre is the successor of the 5th Guards Zvenigorod Order of the Red Banner and Alexander Suvorov Second Degree Airborne Division (ru:5-я гвардейская воздушно-десантная дивизия) that fought during World War II.

The division was formed in the Moscow area in December 1942 from the 9th Airborne Corps of the Soviet Airborne Forces, which had three airborne brigades (20th, 21st, 22nd Airborne Brigade). The 9th Airborne Corps had been fighting as part of the 42nd Army. Its fighting way began in December 1942. It comprised the 1st, 11th, 16th Rifle and the 6th Artillery Regiments. The division fought from Stalingrad across Ukraine to the Austrian town of Amstetten, Lower Austria.

On 24 June 1945 the division was represented at the Moscow Victory Parade of 1945 by sergeants V. Alyokhin, V. Sidelnikov, O. Aristakhov, I. Mamalygin as part of the consolidated 3rd Ukrainian Front.

During the war the division was more than 1922 kilometers of roads in Russia, Ukraine, Moldova, Romania, Hungary and Austria. During the entire period of the war guardsmen killed and 29,830 captured 12,806 enemy soldiers. It destroyed 1,263 tanks, 876 guns, 23 assault guns, 102 armored vehicles, 4,376 vehicles, 8 aircraft. For courage and heroism in battle with the enemy thousand soldiers were awarded orders and medals, and 26 of them were awarded the title "Hero of the Soviet Union" .

==== 112 Guards Rifle Division ====
From 1 July 1946 the division was reorganized as the 12th separate Rifle Brigade, part of the 27th Guards Rifle Corps. On 1 November 1953 the brigade was reorganized as the 112th Guards Rifle Division (165th, 354th, 358th Rifle and 467th artillery regiments). Since 1957 the division was a motor rifle division, and on 1 November 1959 the formation was relocated to the village. From 1962 it was designated the 112th Guards Motor Rifle Training Division, and in 1968 it became the 48th Guards Tank Training Division.

In 1973 a mobilisation division was formed. This division consisted of equipment only, and would have received some personnel from the men of the 48th GTTD, with the remainder to be made up from newly arriving conscripts. It was titled the 70th Reserve (literally 'Spare') Tank Division, and its equipment was co-located with 48 GTTD.

==== 169th District Training Center ====
On 1 December 1987, the 48th Guards division was renamed the 169th Guards Training Centre, known as the "Desna"/169th District Training Center for Junior Professional Tank Troops.

=== Post-Soviet period ===
In 1992 personnel of the training center was one of the first of those, who took the oath of allegiance to the people of Ukraine. On October 4, 1994, a battle flag was handed to the training center.

The center was transferred to the 1st Army Corps after the independence of Ukraine. Colonel Raouf Nurillin (Ukrainian: НУРУЛЛІН Рауф Шайхуллович) - the director of 169th District junior technician training center of the Armoured Forces of the 1st Army Corps of the Odesa Military District - was promoted to major-general by a decree dated 23 August 1995.

Colonel Fedir Mavchuk (Ukrainian: МАКАВЧУК Федір Федорович) - the director of 169th District junior technician training center of the Armoured Forces of the Northern Territorial Operational Command - was promoted to major-general by a decree dated 23 August 1998.

The training centre's barracks was hit as part of a Russian Air Force missile strike on the city of Desna on May 17, 2022. At least 63 people died.

== Units ==
- Five training regiments, Т-64.
- Includes 6th rocket and artillery training regiment.
- 28th Training Battalion (Airmobile Forces) In 1998 the 28th Training Battalion of Airmobile Forces was relocated to Mykolaiv. In 2005 the battalion was relocated to Desna settlement, Chernihiv Oblast.
