= List of Heroes of the Soviet Union (O) =

The Hero of the Soviet Union was the highest distinction of the Soviet Union. It was awarded 12,775 times. Due to the large size of the list, it has been broken up into multiple pages.

This color, along with the † (dagger), indicates that the title was awarded posthumously.

== Military Personnel ==
Name	Unit	Rank	Date of award	Notes
Nikolai Obednyak; Russian: Николай Иванович Обедняк	11th Guards Separate Motorized Reconnaissance Regiment	Red Army Guard	20 December 1943	—
Lev Obelov; Russian: Лев Васильевич Обелов	566th Assault Aviation Regiment	Senior Lieutenant	19 April 1945	—
Nikolai Oberemchenko; Russian: Николай Васильевич Оберемченко	1052nd Infantry Regiment	Captain	27 February 1945	—
Ivan Obiukh; Russian: Иван Данилович Обиух	7th Separate Motorized Pontoon-and-Bridge Battalion	Red Army Man	20 December 1943	—
Ivan Oblikov; Russian: Иван Сергеевич Обликов	Black Sea Fleet	Staff Sergeant	17 October 1944 †	Killed in action on 14 October 1943
Vasily Obodovsky; Russian: Василий Григорьевич Ободовский	703rd Infantry Regiment	Staff Sergeant	24 March 1945 †	Killed in action on 9 November 1944
Savely Oboldin; Russian: Савелий Савельевич Оболдин	32nd Motorized Rifle Brigade	Sergeant	24 March 1945	—
Aleksandr Oborin; Russian: Александр Васильевич Оборин	438th Fighter Aviation Regiment	Lieutenant Colonel	10 April 1945 †	Killed in action on 7 October 1944 while performing an aerial ramming
Boris Obraztsov; Russian: Борис Александрович Образцов	176th Guards Fighter Aviation Regiment	Guard Senior Lieutenant	10 October 1951 †	Died of wounds on 11 July 1951
Ivan Obraztsov; Russian: Иван Васильевич Образцов	838th Infantry Regiment	Starshina	23 October 1943 †	Killed in action on 25 September 1943
Aleksandr Afanasevich Obukhov; Russian: Александр Афанасьевич Обухов	Baltic Fleet	Captain 1st class	6 March 1945	—
Aleksandr Vasilyevich Obukhov; Russian: Александр Васильевич Обухов	227th Artillery Regiment	Starshina	19 April 1945	—
Aleksandr Grigorievich Obukhov; Russian: Александр Григорьевич Обухов	196th Guards Infantry Regiment	Guard Junior Sergeant	22 July 1944	—
Anatoly Obukhov; Russian: Анатолий Ефимович Обухов	175th Separate Sapper Battalion	Senior Lieutenant	19 April 1945	—
Vasily Obukhov; Russian: Василий Михайлович Обухов	25th Guards Long-Range Aviation Regiment	Guard Major	13 March 1944	—
Viktor Obukhov; Russian: Виктор Тимофеевич Обухов	4th Tank Army	Lieutenant General	4 July 1944	—
Yevgeny Obukhov; Russian: Евгений Михайлович Обухов	551st Separate Sapper Battalion	Sergeant	10 January 1944	—
Nikolai Obukhov; Russian: Николай Феоктистович Обухов	212th Anti-Aircraft Brigade	Red Army Man	20 November 1941	—
Timofey Obukhov; Russian: Тимофей Петрович Обухов	12th Fighter Aviation Regiment	Major	1 May 1943	—
Anatoly Obukhovsky; Russian: Анатолий Романович Обуховский	71st Mechanized Brigade	Staff Sergeant	10 January 1944	—
Ivan Obukhovsky; Russian: Иван Денисович Обуховский	29th Infantry Regiment	Red Army Man	10 January 1944	—
Sergey Ovinnikov; Russian: Сергей Михайлович Овинников	314th Artillery Regiment	Sergeant	23 September 1943 †	Killed in action on 11 August 1943
Yakov Ovodov; Russian: Яков Леонтьевич Оводов	133rd Fighter Aviation Regiment	Major	15 May 1946	—
Grigory Ovodovsky; Russian: Григорий Яковлевич Оводовский	7th Trawler Division of the Baltic Fleet	Lieutenant Captain	8 July 1945	—
Mikhail Ovsyankin; Russian: Михаил Иванович Овсянкин	78th Guards Infantry Regiment	Guard Staff Sergeant	22 February 1944	—
Vladimir Ovsyannikov; Russian: Владимир Васильевич Овсянников	1664th Anti-tank Fighter Artillery Regiment	Senior Lieutenant	23 October 1943 †	Killed in action on 12 September 1943
Dmitry Ovsyannikov; Russian: Дмитрий Никитович Овсянников	74th Guards Assault Aviation Regiment	Guard Lieutenant	19 April 1945	—
Konstantin Ovsyannikov; Russian: Константин Васильевич Овсянников	1035th Infantry Regiment	Sergeant	17 October 1943 †	Died of wounds on 2 October 1943
Mikhail Ovsyannikov; Russian: Михаил Кузьмич Овсянников	230th Separate Sapper Battalion	Sergeant	29 October 1943	—
Nikolai Ovsyannikov; Russian: Николай Иванович Овсянников	448th Infantry Regiment	Starshina	27 February 1945	—
Dmitry Ovcharenko; Russian: Дмитрий Романович Овчаренко	389th Infantry Regiment	Red Army Man	9 November 1941	—
Ivan Ovcharenko; Russian: Иван Тихонович Овчаренко	1144th Infantry Regiment	Captain	10 January 1944 †	Killed in action on 21 October 1943
Kuzma Ovcharenko; Russian: Кузьма Иванович Овчаренко	69th Tank Brigade	Colonel	10 January 1944 †	Killed in action on 11 November 1943
Vladimir Ovcharkin; Russian: Владимир Прокофьевич Овчаркин	340th Guards Infantry Regiment	Guard Sergeant	10 April 1945	—
Aleksandr Ovcharov; Russian: Александр Михайлович Овчаров	45th Mechanized Brigade	Guard Lieutenant Colonel	28 April 1945	—
Stepan Polikarpovich Ovcharov; Russian: Степан Поликарпович Овчаров	955th Infantry Regiment	Red Army Man	23 October 1943	—
Stepan Semyonovich Ovcharov; Russian: Степан Семёнович Овчаров	197th Guards Artillery Regiment	Guard Sergeant	22 February 1944 †	Killed in action on 14 October 1943
Aleksandr Ovchinnikov; Russian: Александр Павлович Овчинников	143rd Guards Assault Aviation Regiment	Guard Captain	27 June 1945	—
Boris Ovchinnikov; Russian: Борис Васильевич Овчинников	51st Separate Motorized Sapper Battalion	Senior Lieutenant	24 March 1945	—
Vasily Ovchinnikov; Russian: Василий Фёдорович Овчинников	387th Infantry Regiment	Commissar	7 April 1940	—
Vladimir Ovchinnikov; Russian: Владимир Сергеевич Овчинников	113th Guards Infantry Regiment	Major	31 March 1943 †	Killed in action on 10 January 1943
Grigory Ovchinnikov; Russian: Григорий Семёнович Овчинников	3rd Infantry Battalion 81st Separate Marine Rifle Brigade	Red Army Man	16 May 1944 †	Killed in action on 25 July 1943 after using body as human shield over a machine gun to save his comrades
Maksim Ovchinnikov; Russian: Максим Михайлович Овчинников	34th Guards Infantry Regiment	Guard Junior Sergeant	10 April 1945	—
Nikolai Ovchinnikov; Russian: Николай Тихонович Овчинников	23rd Guards Cavalry Regiment	Guard Captain	24 March 1945	—
Vazgen Oganesov; Russian: Вазген Михайлович Оганесов	347th Fighter Aviation Regiment	Senior Lieutenant	15 May 1946	—
Sergey Oganov; Russian: Сергей Мамбреевич Оганов	606th Infantry Regiment	Lieutenant	22 February 1943 †	Killed in action on 18 November 1941
Grant Oganyants; Russian: Грант Аракелович Оганьянц	71st Tank Regiment	Captain	24 March 1945	—
Mikhail Ogarev; Russian: Михаил Сергеевич Огарёв	783rd Assault Aviation Regiment	Junior Lieutenant	18 August 1945	—
Ivan Ogloblin; Russian: Иван Васильевич Оглоблин	25th Guards Night Bomber Aviation Regiment	Guard Senior Lieutenant	13 April 1944	—
Andrey Ognev; Russian: Андрей Григорьевич Огнёв	151st Infantry Regiment	Junior Sergeant	16 October 1943	—
Ivan Ognev; Russian: Иван Михайлович Огнёв	764th Infantry Regiment	Lieutenant Colonel	27 June 1945	—
Pavel Ognev; Russian: Павел Егорович Огнёв	794th Infantry Regiment	Junior Lieutenant	13 September 1944	—
Nikolai Ogorodnikov; Russian: Николай Иванович Огородников	151st Infantry Regiment	Senior Lieutenant	16 October 1943	—
Maksim Ogylenko; Russian: Максим Артёмович Огуленко	17th Guards Mechanized Brigade	Red Army Guard	10 April 1945	—
Nikolai Ogurechnikov; Russian: Николай Иванович Огуречников	481st Separate Sapper Battalion	Staff Sergeant	24 March 1945	—
Vasily Ogurtsov; Russian: Василий Васильевич Огурцов	45th Guards Cavalry Regiment	Guard Staff Sergeant	24 March 1945 †	Killed in action on 25 December 1944
Leonid Odegov; Russian: Леонид Яковлевич Одегов	491st Separate Mortar Regiment	Staff Sergeant	9 February 1944	—
Pyotr Odinets; Russian: Пётр Трофимович Одинец	17th Artillery Regiment	Starshina	18 November 1944	—
Laniil Odintsov; Russian: Даниил Сидорович Одинцов	18th Separate Marine Corps Coastal Defense Battalion of the Black Sea Fleet	Seaman	23 October 1945 †	Killed in action on 7 November 1941
Mikhail Odintsov; Russian: Михаил Петрович Одинцов	820th Assault Aviation Regiment; 155th Guards Assault Aviation Regiment	Senior Lieutenant; Guard Major	4 February 1944; 27 June 1945	Twice Hero of the Soviet Union
Pyotr Odnobokov; Russian: Пётр Максимович Однобоков	118th Guards Assault Aviation Regiment	Guard Senior Lieutenant	18 August 1945	—
Stepan Odnovorchenko; Russian: Степан Савельевич Одноворченко	448th Assault Aviation Regiment	Major	23 February 1945	—
German Odnotsenov; Russian: Герман Петрович Одноценов	951st Assault Aviation Regiment	Lieutenant	29 June 1945	—
Ilya Ozhiganov; Russian: Илья Алексеевич Ожиганов	565th Infantry Regiment	Private	23 October 1943	—
Grigory Ozhmegov; Russian: Григорий Фёдорович Ожмегов	278th Guards Infantry Regiment	Guard Sergeant	24 March 1945 †	Killed in action on 23 September 1944
Andrey Ozhogin; Russian: Андрей Матвеевич Ожогин	988th Infantry Regiment	Lieutenant Colonel	31 May 1945	—
Aleksey Ozerin; Russian: Алексей Николаевич Озерин	237th Guards Infantry Regiment	Guard Sergeant	15 January 1944 †	Killed in action on 13 January 1944
Fyodor Ozerin; Russian: Фёдор Иванович Озерин	22nd Guards Separate Tank Regiment	Guard Starshina	16 May 1944	—
Ivan Ozerov; Russian: Иван Никитович Озеров	465th Infantry Regiment	Senior Lieutenant	10 January 1944	—
Mikhail Ozimin; Russian: Михаил Иванович Озимин	28th Infantry Corps	Guard Lieutenant-General	29 June 1945	—
Fyodor Okatenko; Russian: Фёдор Алексеевич Окатенко	384th Separate Marine Corps Battalion of the Black Sea Fleet	Seaman	20 April 1945 †	Killed in action on 27 March 1944
Matvey Okorokov; Russian: Матвей Петрович Окороков	88th Tank Brigade	Lieutenant	23 September 1945	—
Boris Okrestin; Russian: Борис Семёнович Окрестин	74th Guards Assault Aviation Regiment	Guard Senior Lieutenant	13 April 1944	Killed in action on 6 July 1944
Mariya Oktyabrskaya; Russian: Мария Васильевна Октябрьская	26th Guards Tank Brigade	Guard Sergeant	2 August 1944 †	Died of wounds on 15 March 1944
Filipp Oktyabrsky; Russian: Филипп Сергеевич Октябрьский	Chief of the Black Sea Higher Naval School named after P.S. Nakhimov	Admiral	20 February 1958	—
Akinf Okunev; Russian: Акинф Кириллович Окунев	106th Separate Anti-tank Fighter Division	Staff Sergeant	25 October 1943	—
Grigory Okunev; Russian: Григорий Селиверстович Окунев	966th Artillery Regiment	Junior Sergeant	31 May 1945	—
Vasily Olbinsky; Russian: Василий Александрович Олбинский	9th Separate Pontoon-and-Bridge Battalion	Staff Sergeant	17 October 1943	—
Vadim Oleynik; Russian: Вадим Клавдиевич Олейник	1991th Anti-Aircraft Artillery Regiment	Senior Lieutenant	22 August 1944	Killed in action on 5 April 1944
Vasily Oleynik; Russian: Василий Петрович Олейник	873rd Infantry Regiment	Red Army Man	24 March 1945	—
Grigory Oleynik; Russian: Григорий Никитович Олейник	293rd Fighter Aviation Regiment	Captain	24 August 1943	—
Ivan Oleynik; Russian: Иван Леонтьевич Олейник	453rd Infantry Regiment	Senior Lieutenant	24 March 1945	—
Mikhail Oleynik; Russian: Михаил Иванович Олейник	100th Guards Mortar Regiment	Guard Starshina	21 April 1943	—
Vasily Oleynikov; Russian: Василий Семёнович Олейников	143rd Guards Assault Aviation Regiment	Guard Lieutenant	27 June 1945	—
Ivan Oleynikov; Russian: Иван Иванович Олейников	92nd Engineering and Tank Regiment	Lieutenant	31 May 1945	Killed in action on 8 March 1945
Pavel Oleynikov; Russian: Павел Романович Олейников	541st Infantry Regiment	Junior Commander	7 April 1940	—
Dmitry Oleynichenko; Russian: Дмитрий Елисеевич Олейниченко	189th Guards Assault Aviation Regiment	Guard Captain	18 August 1945	—
Klementy Oleynyuk; Russian: Клементий Карпович Олейнюк	60th Guards Infantry Regiment	Guard Junior Sergeant	13 September 1944 †	Killed in action on 27 March 1944
Aleksandr Olenin; Russian: Александр Михайлович Оленин	120th Guards Infantry Regiment	Guard Private	19 March 1944	—
Ivan Olenich; Russian: Иван Иванович Оленич	703rd Separate Communications Company	Junior Lieutenant	10 January 1944	—
Aleksey Olepir; Russian: Алексей Иванович Олепир	657th Assault Aviation Regiment	Senior Lieutenant	18 August 1945	—
Nikolay Oleshev; Russian: Николай Николаевич Олешев	113th Infantry Corps	Lieutenant-General	8 September 1945	—
Nikolai Olovyannikov; Russian: Николай Ефимович Оловянников	312th Assault Aviation Regiment	Lieutenant	26 October 1944	—
Aleksandr Olkhovikov; Russian: Александр Васильевич Ольховиков	Commander of the TK-208 submarine	Captain 1st Class	2 February 1984	—
Nikolai Olkhovsky; Russian: Николай Иванович Ольховский	193rd Guards Fighter Aviation Regiment	Major	4 February 1944	—
Nikolai Olchev; Russian: Николай Данилович Ольчев	375th Artillery Regiment	Red Army Man	16 October 1943	—
Konstantin Olshansky; Russian: Константин Фёдорович Ольшанский	384th Separate Marine Corps Battalion of the Black Sea Fleet	Senior Lieutenant	20 April 1945 †	Killed in action on 27 March 1944
Aleksandr Olshevsky; Russian: Александр Васильевич Ольшевский	1455th Self-propelled Artillery Regiment	Guard Junior Lieutenant	24 March 1945	—
Nikolai Olshevsky; Russian: Николай Михайлович Ольшевский	26th Guards Tank Brigade	Guard Junior Lieutenant	24 March 1945 †	Died of wounds on 22 August 1944
Nikolai Omelechko; Russian: Николай Фёдорович Омелечко	40th Guards Infantry Regiment	Guard Lieutenant	19 June 1943	—
Nikolai Omelin; Russian: Николай Титович Омелин	10th Guards Infantry Regiment	Guard Captain	16 October 1943	—
Ivan Omelchenko; Russian: Иван Алексеевич Омельченко	329th Separate Communications Company	Red Army Man	19 March 1944	—
Grigory Omelchuk; Russian: Григорий Куприянович Омельчук	1317th Infantry Regiment	Captain	13 September 1944	—
Filipp Omelyanyuk; Russian: Филипп Трофимович Омельянюк	447th Infantry Regiment	Guard Senior Lieutenant	27 February 1945	—
Ivan Omigov; Russian: Иван Фёдорович Омигов	828th Assault Aviation Regiment	Lieutenant	18 September 1945 †	—
Nina Onilova; Russian: Нина Андреевна Онилова	54th Infantry Regiment	Staff Sergeant	14 May 1965 †	Killed in action on 8 March 1942
Grigory Oniskevich; Russian: Григорий Демьянович Онискевич	164th Fighter Aviation Regiment	Senior Lieutenant	1 July 1944	—
Viktor Onishchenko; Russian: Виктор Павлович Онищенко	134th Guards Bomber Aviation Regiment	Guard Senior Lieutenant	29 June 1945	—
Grigory Onishchenko; Russian: Григорий Харлампиевич Онищенко	886th Artillery Regiment	Junior Sergeant	16 October 1943	—
Oleg Ohishchuk; Russian: Олег Петрович Онищук	186th Separate Spetnaz Task Force	Senior Lieutenant	5 May 1988 †	Killed in action on 31 October 1987
Nikolai Onopa; Russian: Николай Савельевич Онопа	107th Guards Infantry Regiment	Guard Starshina	29 June 1945	—
Ivan Onoprienko; Russian: Иван Алексеевич Оноприенко	130th Separate Anti-tank Fighter Artillery Division	Staff Sergeant	22 February 1944 †	Killed in action on 1 December 1943
Nikolai Nikolaevich Onoprienko; Russian: Николай Николаевич Оноприенко	37th Guards Infantry Division	Guard Colonel	29 June 1945	—
Nikolai Markovich Onoprienko; Russian: Николай Маркович Онопченко	163rd Guards Fighter Aviation Regiment	Guard Senior Lieutenant	15 May 1946	—
Beysen Ontaev; Russian: Бейсен Сеитович Онтаев	120th Infantry Regiment	Red Army Man	30 October 1943	—
Dmitry Onuprienko; Russian: Дмитрий Платонович Онуприенко	6th Guards Infantry Division	Major General	16 October 1934	—
Yuri Onusaytis; Russian: Юрий Иосифович Онусайтис	95th Guards Infantry Regiment	Guard Captain	24 March 1945	—
Grigory Onufrienko; Russian: Григорий Денисович Онуфриенко	129th Fighter Aviation Regiment	Senior Lieutenant	12 April 1942	—
Mikhail Onuchin; Russian: Михаил Васильевич Онучин	3rd Guards Tank Army	Guard Colonel	17 November 1943 †	Killed in action on 5 October 1943
Aleksandr Opalev; Russian: Александр Алексеевич Опалев	1052nd Infantry Regiment	Red Army Man	31 May 1945 †	Killed in action on 3 February 1945 after suicide-attacking an approaching German tank with grenades
Aleksey Opalev; Russian: Алексей Константинович Опалев	29th Guards Infantry Regiment	Guard Junior Sergeant	15 January 1944 †	Killed in action on
Vladimir Opalev; Russian: Владимир Никифорович Опалёв	622nd Assault Aviation Regiment	Senior Lieutenant	13 April 1944	—
Ivan Opalev; Russian: Иван Васильевич Опалёв	40th Guards Separate Mortar Battalion	Guard Major	24 March 1945	—
Aleksandr Oparin; Russian: Александр Яковлевич Опарин	191st Separate Motorized Rifle Regiment	Major	20 September 1982 †	Killed in action on 17 May 1982
Aleksandr Oplachko; Russian: Александр Алексеевич Оплачко	955th Infantry Regiment	Red Army Man	23 October 1943 †	Killed in action on 22 September 1943
Nikolai Oplesnin; Russian: Николай Васильевич Оплеснин	111th Rifle Division	Junior Lieutenant	27 December 1941	—
Boris Oprokidnev; Russian: Борис Константинович Опрокиднев	511th Separate Reconnaissance Aviation Regiment	Senior Lieutenant	15 May 1946 †	Killed in action on 2 April 1945
Nikolai Opryshko; Russian: Николай Александрович Опрышко	155th Guards Assault Aviation Regiment	Guard Senior Lieutenant	27 June 1945	—
Konstantin Orgin; Russian: Константин Петрович Оргин	219th Infantry Regiment	Junior Sergeant	5 October 1944	—
Ivan Oryol; Russian: Иван Яковлевич Орёл	40th Infantry Regiment	Captain	25 September 1944 †	Killed in action on 22 September 1944
Stepan Oryol; Russian: Степан Фёдорович Орёл	1069th Infantry Regiment	Red Army Man	13 May 1945	—
Aleksey Orekhov; Russian: Алексей Егорович Орехов	569th Infantry Regiment	Red Army Man	23 October 1943	—
Vladimir Aleksandrovich Orekhov; Russian: Владимир Александрович Орехов	32nd Guards Fighter Regiment	Guard Senior Lieutenant	1 May 1943	—
Vladimir Viktorovich Orekhov; Russian: Владимир Викторович Орехов	199th Motorized Rifle Regiment	Junior Sergeant	31 July 1969	—
Ivan Orekhov; Russian: Иван Васильевич Орехов	307th Guards Infantry Regiment	Red Army Guard	22 February 1944	—
Pyotr Orekhov; Russian: Пётр Иванович Орехов	125th Tank Battalion	Major	10 January 1944	—
Sergey Orekhov; Russian: Сергей Яковлевич Орехов	1187th Anti-Tank Artillery Fighter Regiment	Senior Lieutenant	24 March 1945	—
Trofim Orekhov; Russian: Трофим Филиппович Орехов	835th Infantry Regiment	Junior Sergeant	23 October 1943 †	Went missing in action in October 1943 and presumed deceased
Sergey Oreshkov; Russian: Сергей Николаевич Орешков	124th Guards Infantry Regiment	Guard Junior Lieutenant	20 December 1943 †	Killed in action on 16 August 1943
Nikolai Orishchenko; Russian: Николай Николаевич Орищенко	6th Guards Infantry Regiment	Guard Junior Sergeant	16 May 1944	—
Aleksandr Mikhailovich Orlov; Russian: Александр Михайлович Орликов	44th Guards Tank Brigade	Senior Lieutenant	27 February 1945 †	Killed in action on 2 March 1945
Aleksandr Ivanovich Orlov; Russian: Александр Иванович Орлов	5th Guards Fighter Aviation Regiment	Guard Senior Lieutenant	27 June 1945	—
Aleksandr Ignatevich Orlov; Russian: Александр Игнатьевич Орлов	132nd Guards Artillery Regiment	Guard Senior Lieutenant	31 May 1945	—
Vasily Orlov; Russian: Василий Фёдорович Орлов	6th Guards Mechanized Corps	Guard Colonel	6 April 1945 †	Killed in action on 19 March 1945
Viktor Orlov; Russian: Виктор Николаевич Орлов	113th Guards Fighter Aviation Regiment	Guard Captain	28 September 1943	—
Vitaly Orlov; Russian: Виталий Дмитриевич Орлов	98th Separate Reconnaissance Aviation Regiment	Senior Lieutenant	31 May 1945	—
Ivan Mikhailovich Orlov; Russian: Иван Михайлович Орлов	509th Infantry Regiment 236th	Colonel	1 November 1943	—
Ivan Petrovich Orlov; Russian: Иван Петрович Орлов	743rd Infantry Regiment	Red Army Man	24 March 1945	—
Konstantin Orlov; Russian: Константин Николаевич Орлов	31st High-Speed Bomber Aviation Regiment	Captain	7 April 1940 †	Killed in action on 11 March 1940
Leonid Orlov; Russian: Леонид Александрович Орлов	70th Fighter Aviation Regiment	Senior Lieutenant	29 September 1939	—
Mikhail Yegorovich Orlov; Russian: Михаил Егорович Орлов	848th Infantry Regiment	Starshina	24 March 1945 †	Killed in action on 7 May 1944
Mikhail Ivanovich Orlov; Russian: Михаил Иванович Орлов	121st Guards Regiment of the 43rd Guards Latvian Rifle Division	Guard Captain	24 March 1945 †	Killed in action on 3 August 1944
Mikhail Petrovich Orlov; Russian: Михаил Петрович Орлов	7th Guards Aviation Regiment	Guard Major	29 June 1945	—
Mikhail Fyodorovich Orlov; Russian: Михаил Фёдорович Орлов	65th Tank Brigade of the 11th Tank Corps	Senior Lieutenant	27 February 1945	—
Mikhail Yakovlevich Orlov; Russian: Михаил Яковлевич Орлов	336th Long-Range Bomber Aviation Regiment	Captain	15 May 1946	—
Pavel Aleksandrovich Orlov; Russian: Павел Александрович Орлов	994th Infantry Regiment	Staff Sergeant	10 April 1945 †	Killed in action on 18 January 1945
Pavel Ivanovich Orlov; Russian: Павел Иванович Орлов	2nd Guards Fighter Aviation Regiment	Guard Captain	24 July 1945 †	Killed in action on 15 March 1943
Pyotr Orlov; Russian: Пётр Иванович Орлов	707th Assault Aviation Regiment	Senior Lieutenant	18 August 1945 †	Killed in action on 3 April 1945
Timofey Orlov; Russian: Тимофей Николаевич Орлов	787th Infantry Regiment	Major	3 June 1944 †	Killed in action on 26 December 1943
Fedot Orlov; Russian: Федот Никитович Орлов	21st Separate Heavy Bomber Aviation Squadron	Captain	21 July 1942	—
Yakov Orlov; Russian: Яков Никифорович Орлов	11th Separate Reconnaissance Aviation Regiment	Senior Lieutenant	23 February 1945	—
Konstantin Orlyansky; Russian: Константин Иванович Орловский	41st Tank Brigade	Captain	24 March 1945 †	Killed in action on 22 July 1944
Pavel Orlyansky; Russian: Павел Иванович Орлянский	56th Engineer-Sapper Brigade	Lieutenant	24 March 1945	—
Yefim Orokhovatsky; Russian: Ефим Савельевич Ороховатский	26th Guards Airborne Regiment	Guard Lieutenant Colonel	27 June 1945	—
Yegor Orsaev; Russian: Егор Орсаевич Орсаев	683rd Artillery Regiment	Sergeant	10 April 1945	—
Nikolai Ortynsky; Russian: Николай Игнатьевич Ортынский	321st Guards Anti-tank Fighter Artillery Regiment	Guard Major	24 December 1943	—
Aleksandr Osadchiev; Russian: Александр Дмитриевич Осадчиев	43rd Fighter Aviation Regiment	Major	15 May 1946	—
Aleksandr Osadchy; Russian: Александр Петрович Осадчий	11th Guards Fighter Aviation Division	Guard Major-General	27 June 1945	—
Aleksey Osadchy; Russian: Алексей Антонович Осадчий	276th Guards Infantry Regiment	Guard Captain	22 February 1944	—
Denis Osadchy; Russian: Денис Матвеевич Осадчий	6th Guards Motorized Rifle Brigade	Guard Colonel	28 April 1945 †	Killed in action on 14 October 1944
Semyon Osadchy; Russian: Семён Кузьмич Осадчий	Tank platoon in the Spanish Civil War	Lieutenant	31 December 1936	—
Dmitry Osatyuk; Russian: Дмитрий Иванович Осатюк	549th Tank Battalion	Lieutenant	10 February 1943	—
Nikolai Osiev; Russian: Николай Петрович Осиев	588th Infantry Regiment	Senior Lieutenant	24 March 1945	—
Dmitry Osin; Russian: Дмитрий Васильевич Осин	172nd Guards Infantry Regiment	Guard Captain	24 March 1945	—
Nikolai Osin; Russian: Николай Архипович Осин	1646th Anti-tank Fighter Artillery Regiment	Sergeant	23 September 1944 †	Killed in action on 3 October 1944
Ivan Osinnyi; Russian: Иван Иванович Осинный	433rd Infantry Regiment	Red Army Man	24 March 1945	—
Aleksandr Stepanovich Osipenko; Russian: Александр Степанович Осипенко	Moscow Military District Air Forces	Colonel	22 February 1939	—
Aleksandr Trofimovich Osipenko; Russian: Александр Трофимович Осипенко	301st Howitzer Artillery Regiment	Lieutenant	11 April 1940 †	Killed in action on 27 March 1940
Ivan Osipenko; Russian: Иван Степанович Осипенко	436th Artillery Regiment	Captain	10 April 1945 †	Killed in action on 31 January 1945
Leonid Osipenko; Russian: Леонид Гаврилович Осипенко	Commander of the first Soviet nuclear submarine - Project 627 "Kit"	Captain 1st class	23 July 1959	—
Pyotr Osipenko; Russian: Пётр Дмитриевич Осипенко	Senior Researcher in Special Military Unit No. 45707 of the Ministry of Defense of the USSR	Captain 1st class	21 December 1989	—
Polina Osipenko; Russian: Полина Денисовна Осипенко	Co-pilot of the ANT-37 "Rodina"	Captain	2 November 1938	—
Aleksandr Arkhipovich Osipov; Russian: Александр Архипович Осипенко	229th Infantry Regiment	Captain	16 October 1943	—
Aleksandr Mikhailovich Osipov; Russian: Александр Михайлович Осипов	569th Assault Aviation Regiment	Captain	18 August 1945	—
Vasily Vasilyevich Osipov; Russian: Василий Васильевич Осипов	2nd Guards Bomber Aviation Regiment	Guard Captain	29 June 1945	—
Vasily Ivanovich Osipov; Russian: Василий Иванович Осипов	310th Infantry Regiment	Red Army Man	16 October 1943	—
Vasily Ivanovich Osipov; Russian: Василий Иванович Осипов	38th Tank Regiment	Captain	4 June 1944 †	Killed in action on 6 January 1944
Vasily Nikolaevich Osipov; Russian: Василий Николаевич Осипов	81st Long-Range Aviation Regiment; 5th Guards Aviation Regiment	Senior Lieutenant; Guard Captain	20 June 1942; 13 March 1944	Twice Hero of the Soviet Union
Yevgeny Osipov; Russian: Евгений Яковлевич Осипов	Commander of the "Щ-406" submarine	Captain 3rd Class	23 October 1942	—
Ivan Osipov; Russian: Иван Иванович Осипов	91st Separate Engineer Battalion	Lieutenant	3 June 1944 †	Killed in action on 28 September 1943
Ilya Osipov; Russian: Илья Тимофеевич Осипов	134th Separate Motorized Pontoon-and-Bridge Battalion	Red Army Man	10 January 1944 †	Went missing in action in January 1944 and presumed dead
Kirill Osipov; Russian: Кирилл Никифорович Осипов	245th Hawitzer Artillery Regiment	Commissar	15 August 1941	—
Mikhail Ivanovich Osipov; Russian: Михаил Иванович Осипов	37th Guards Infantry Regiment	Guard Staff Sergeant	15 January 1944 †	Killed in action on 11 November 1943
Mikhail Ivanovich Osipov; Russian: Михаил Иванович Осипов	175th Guards Infantry Regiment	Guard Lieutenant	20 December 1943	—
Mikhail Mikhailovich Osipov; Russian: Михаил Михайлович Осипов	8th Fighter Aviation Regiment	Lieutenant	6 June 1942	—
Pavel Osipov; Russian: Павел Дмитриевич Осипов	384th Separate Marine Corps Battalion of the Black Sea Fleet	Red Fleet Man	20 April 1945 †	Killed in action on 27 March 1944
Semyon Osipov; Russian: Семён Дмитриевич Осипов	20th Guards Mechanized Brigade	Guard Captain	26 April 1944	—
Sergey Osipov; Russian: Сергей Александрович Осипов	Torpedo Brigade of the Baltic Fleet	Lieutenant Captain	3 April 1942	—
Dmitry Oskalenko; Russian: Дмитрий Ефимович Оскаленко	26th Fighter Aviation Regiment	Senior Lieutenant	14 February 1943 †	Killed in action on 26 September 1942
Nikolai Oslikobsky; Russian: Николай Сергеевич Осликовский	3rd Guards Cavalry Corps	Lieutenant-General	29 May 1945	—
Pyotr Osminin; Russian: Пётр Ермолаевич Осминин	1452nd Self-Propelled Artillery Regiment	Guard Starshina	24 March 1945	—
Aleksey Ostaev; Russian: Алексей Егорович Остаев	58th High-Speed Bomber Aviation Regiment	Senior Lieutenant	21 March 1940	—
Andrey Ostapenko; Russian: Андрей Николаевич Остапенко	1292nd Infantry Regiment	Red Army Man	3 June 1944	—
Dmitry Ostapenko; Russian: Дмитрий Яковлевич Остапенко	10th Guards Infantry Brigade	Guard Junior Sergeant	13 December 1942	—
Ivan Grigorievich Ostapenko; Russian: Иван Григорьевич Остапенко	1st Infantry Regiment	Junior Sergeant	24 March 1945	—
Ivan Petrovich Ostapenko; Russian: Иван Петрович Остапенко	7th Guards Assault Aviation Regiment	Guard Captain	23 February 1945	—
Iosif Ostapenko; Russian: Иосиф Васильевич Остапенко	859th Infantry Regiment	Lieutenant	13 September 1944	—
Pavel Ostapenko; Russian: Павел Антонович Остапенко	958th Infantry Regiment	Captain	28 April 1945 †	Killed in action on 1 January 1944
Stepan Ostapchenko; Russian: Степан Кузьмич Остапенко	131st Guards Artillery Regiment	Guard Senior Lieutenant	22 February 1944 †	Killed in action on 30 October 1943
Nikolai Ostapchenko; Russian: Николай Васильевич Остапченко	117th Guards Infantry Regiment	Guard Staff Sergeant	24 March 1945 †	Killed in action on 5 September 1944
Fyodor Ostashenko; Russian: Фёдор Афанасьевич Осташенко	25th Guards Infantry Corps	Guard Major-General	28 April 1945	—
Sergey Ostashchenko; Russian: Сергей Михайлович Остащенко	1844th Anti-tank Fighter Artillery Regiment	Junior Sergeant	26 October 1943	—
Ivan Ostroverkhov; Russian: Иван Григорьевич Островерхов	15th Motorized Rifle Brigade	Major	13 September 1944	—
Nikolai Ostryakov; Russian: Николай Алексеевич Остряков	Commander of the Black Sea Fleet Air Force	Major-General	14 June 1942 †	Killed in action on 24 April 1942
Demyan Osyka; Russian: Демьян Васильевич Осыка	46th Assault Aviation Regiment	Captain	22 July 1944	—
Aleksandr Oskin; Russian: Александр Петрович Оськин	53rd Guards Tank Brigade	Guard Junior Lieutenant	23 September 1944	—
Dmitry Oskin; Russian: Дмитрий Павлович Оськин	523rd Fighter Aviation Regiment	Major	13 November 1951	—
Zakhar Osyagin; Russian: Захар Маркелович Осягин	560th Artillery Regiment	Sergeant	24 March 1945 †	Killed in action on 23 August 1944
Ivan Otmakhov; Russian: Иван Григорьевич Отмахов	342nd Infantry Regiment	Lieutenant	29 June 1945 †	Killed in action on 23 April 1945
Asanbek Otorbaev; Russian: Асанбек Оторбаев	296th Infantry Regiment	Junior Sergeant	10 April 1945	—
Pyotr Otroshko; Russian: Пётр Константинович Отрошко	132nd Infantry Regiment	Sergeant	24 March 1945	—
Aleksey Otstavnov; Russian: Алексей Иванович Отставнов	77th Guards Separate Reconnaissance Company	Junior Lieutenant	26 October 1943	—
Grigory Okhay; Russian: Григорий Ульянович Охай	523rd Fighter Aviation Regiment	Captain	13 November 1951	—
Fyodor Okhlopkov; Russian: Фёдор Матвеевич Охлопков	259th Infantry Regiment	Sergeant	6 May 1965	—
Nikolai Okhman; Russian: Николай Петрович Охман	34th Guards Motorized Rifle Brigade	Guard Colonel	6 April 1945	—
Nikolai Okhrimenko; Russian: Николай Иосифович Охрименко	465th Infantry Regiment	Sergeant	13 November 1943	—
Konstantin Otsimik; Russian: Константин Владимирович Оцимик	1628th Anti-tank Fighter Artillery Regiment	Senior Lieutenant	27 June 1945	—
Vladimir Ochelenko; Russian: Владимир Николаевич Очеленко	384th Separate Marine Corps Battalion of the Black Sea Fleet	Foreman 2nd Class	20 April 1945 †	Killed in action on 27 March 1944
Mikhail Ocheret; Russian: Михаил Иосифович Очерет	990th Infantry Regiment	Corporal	31 May 1945 †	Killed in action on 8 February 1945
Ivan Ocheretko; Russian: Иван Данилович Очеретько	615th Infantry Regiment	Senior Lieutenant	29 October 1943	—
Valery Ochirov; Russian: Валерий Николаевич Очиров	Soviet Forces in Afghanistan	Lieutenant Colonel	21 February 1985	—
Ivan Oshmarin; Russian: Иван Константинович Ошмарин	148th Anti-Tank Division	Staff Sergeant	16 October 1943 †	Killed in action on 24 July 1943
Andrey Oshchepkov; Russian: Андрей Иванович Ощепков	10th Guards Mechanized Brigade	Guard Staff Sergeant	10 March 1944	—

== Partisans ==
Name	Area	Date of award	Notes
Anton Odukha; Russian: Антон Захарович Одуха	Khmelnytskyi resistance	7 August 1944	—
Vladimir Omelyanyuk; Russian: Владимир Степанович Омельянюк	Minsk underground newspaper	8 May 1965 †	Captured and executed 26 May 1942
Nikolai Orlov; Russian: Николай Сергеевич Орлов	Ukrainian partisan movement	2 May 1945	—
Kirill Orlovsky; Russian: Кирилл Прокофьевич Орловский	Baranavichy partisan movement leader	20 September 1943	—
Mariya Osipova; Russian: Мария Борисовна Осипова	Minsk resistance	29 October 1943	—
Otomārs Oškalns; Russian: Отомар Петрович Ошкалнс	Latvian partisan brigade leader	28 June 1945	—
Fyodor Ozmitel; Russian: Фёдор Фёдорович Озмитель	Belarusian paramilitary partisan detachment	5 November 1944 †	Blew himself up with grenades to avoid capture after running out of ammunition while covering the retreat of his comrades

== Test pilots ==
Name	Date of award	Aircraft tested
Fyodor Opadchy; Russian: Фёдор Фёдорович Опадчий	7 February 1957	Tested various aircraft including the Tu-2, Tu-14, Tu-70, and Tu-80.
Boris Orlov; Russian: Борис Антонович Орлов	11 October 1974	Tested various aircraft including the MiG-21, MiG-23, MiG-25R, MiG-27, MiG-29, and MiG-31M
Pyotr Ostapenko; Russian: Пётр Максимович Остапенко	26 April 1971	Tested various aircraft including the MiG-19, MiG-21, MiG-23, MiG-25, MiG-27, MiG-29,

== Soviet Civilians ==
Name	Date of award	Field of study
Mikhail Ostpekin; Russian: Михаил Емельянович Острекин	6 December 1949	Head of the Arctic geophysics research institute in the North Sea

== National Leaders ==
Name	Date of award	Role
Nikolai Ogarkov; Russian: Николай Васильевич Огарков	28 October 1977	Marshal of the Soviet Union
