= Vitaly Orlov =

Vitaly Orlov may refer to:

- Vitaly Orlov (rugby union), Ukrainian rugby union player
- Vitaly Dmitrievich Orlov (1923–2014); see List of Heroes of the Soviet Union (O)
- A Russian co-owner of the company Ocean Trawlers later known as Norebo
- A fictional character in the movie Lord of War
