= Ovsyannikov =

Ovsyannikov (Russian: Овсянников) is a Russian masculine surname, its feminine counterpart is Ovsyannikova. It may refer to

- Aleksandr Ovsyannikov (born 1974), Russian footballer
- Anastasiya Ovsyannikova (born 1988), Russian Paralympic athlete
- Denys Ovsyannikov (born 1984), Ukrainian futsal player
- Dmitry Ovsyannikov (born 1977), Russian politician
- Filipp Ovsyannikov (1827–1906), Russian histologist and the founder of sturgeon breeding in Russia
- Ksenia Ovsyannikova (born 1985), Russian wheelchair fencer
- Marina Ovsyannikova (born 1978), Russian TV producer
- Mikhail Ovsyannikov (1915–1987), Soviet philosopher and academic
- Oleg Ovsyannikov (born 1970), Russian ice dancer
- Vladimir Ovsyannikov (born 1961), Russian politician
- Yaroslav Ovsyannikov (born 1993), Russian football player
- Yevgeni Ovsyannikov (born 1982), Russian footballer
