= Nikolai Olovyannikov =

Soviet Air Force officer (1922–2021)

- Николай Ефимович Оловянников
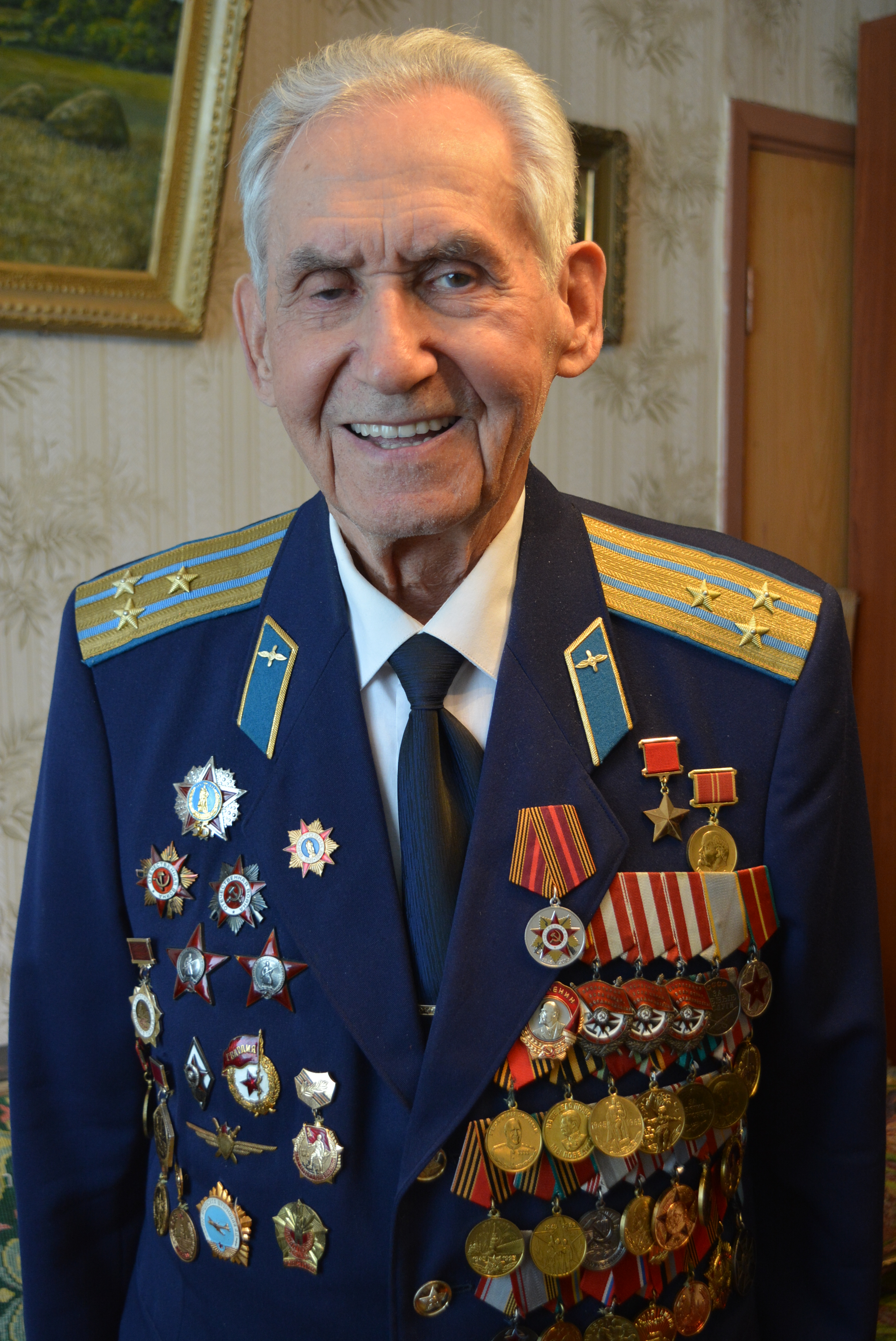
- Born: 22 December 1922; Medvenka, Kursky Uyezd, Kursk Governorate, Russian SFSR
- Died: 15 April 2021 (aged 98); Moscow, Russian Federation
- Military career
- Allegiance: USSR; Russia
- Branch: Soviet Air Force
- Service years: 1941–1962
- Rank: Polkovnik (Colonel)
- Conflicts: Second World War
- Awards: Hero of the Soviet Union; Order of Lenin; Order of the Red Banner (three times); Order of the Patriotic War First Class (twice); Order of the Red Star (twice); Medal "For Battle Merit"; Medal "For the Victory over Germany in the Great Patriotic War 1941–1945"; Medal of Zhukov; Medal "For the Capture of Königsberg"; Medal "Veteran of the Armed Forces of the USSR"; Medal "Veteran of Labour"; Medal "For Impeccable Service" First Class; Medal for Oder, Neisse and Baltic

Nikolai Yefimovich Olovyannikov (Russian: Никола́й Ефи́мович Оловя́нников; 22 December 1922 – 15 April 2021) was an officer of the Soviet Air Force. Over his time in service, he reached the rank of polkovnik, the Soviet equivalent to colonel. In 1944 he was awarded the title of Hero of the Soviet Union.

Olovyannikov's interest in flying began in childhood, and he attended a flying club during his high school studies. Called up for service in the armed forces shortly after the Axis invasion of the Soviet Union in 1941, he was assigned for further training at the Voroshilovgrad military aviation school. Despite only completing 13 of the 150 flying hours usually required, Olovyannikov was quickly pressed into service flying the Ilyushin Il-2 attack aircraft. He was assigned to the 312th Assault Aviation Regiment, and spent the rest of the war with this unit. His first combat sorties took place during the Battle of Kursk. He went on to see action in many of the important battles as the Red Army advanced through the war, fighting at the Battle of Smolensk, Operation Bagration, the East Prussian offensive, and the Battle of Königsberg. In 1944 he was awarded the title of Hero of the Soviet Union, and ultimately flew 212 sorties, without once being shot down.

Olovyannikov remained in the air force after the war, reaching the rank of polkovnik before his retirement from military service in 1962. He was then employed by the Moscow Institute of Petrochemical and Gas Industry, where he worked in the military department and took an interest in training. In retirement he settled in Moscow, where he died in 2021 at the age of 98, having received a large number of awards and honours over his lifetime.

== Early life and career ==
Olovyannikov was born into a Russian peasant family on 22 December 1922 in Medvenka, Kursky Uyezd, then part of Kursk Governorate, in the Russian Soviet Socialist Federative Republic. Following the death of Nikolai's father when he was three years old, his mother moved the family, consisting of herself and three children, to Kostiantynivka in 1930. Olovyannikov studied in the local school, graduating from the 8th grade, and also attended a flying club from the age of 16, training on simulators, and then on Polikarpov Po-2s. He joined the Red Army on 28 June 1941, shortly after the Axis invasion of the Soviet Union. He studied at the Voroshilovgrad military aviation school, which had been evacuated to Uralsk in the Kazakh Soviet Socialist Republic. The cadets were trained to fly in high-speed bombers, and then on Ilyushin Il-2 attack aircraft. The cadets were usually required to have 150 flight hours on the Il-2, but due to wartime exigencies, Olovyannikov flew only 13 before being quickly graduated in 1943. He was told "It's okay, you will finish your studies at the front." Olovyannikov was drafted into front-line service from July 1943, and was assigned to the 312th Assault Aviation Regiment. He would serve with this unit for the entirety of the war.

== Wartime combat ==
Olovyannikov's first combat mission took place on 12 July 1943, during the Battle of Kursk. He went on to see action during the Battle of Smolensk, Operation Bagration, the East Prussian offensive, and the Battle of Königsberg. During this period the 312th Assault Aviation Regiment formed part of the 233rd Assault Aviation Division, 4th Assault Aviation Corps of the 4th Air Army of the 2nd Belorussian Front. The summer of 1943 was a particularly busy one for Olovyannikov, as he personally destroyed six field guns and seventeen vehicles, blew up two bridges, and shot down a Focke-Wulf plane. For ten successful combat missions during the Battle of Kursk, Olovyannikov was awarded the Order of the Red Star. By August 1944 Olovyannikov had reached the rank of lieutenant, and had flown 100 sorties, destroying two aircraft on the ground, five tanks, fifteen railway cars, and many other pieces of enemy military equipment. He joined the Communist Party of the Soviet Union in 1944.

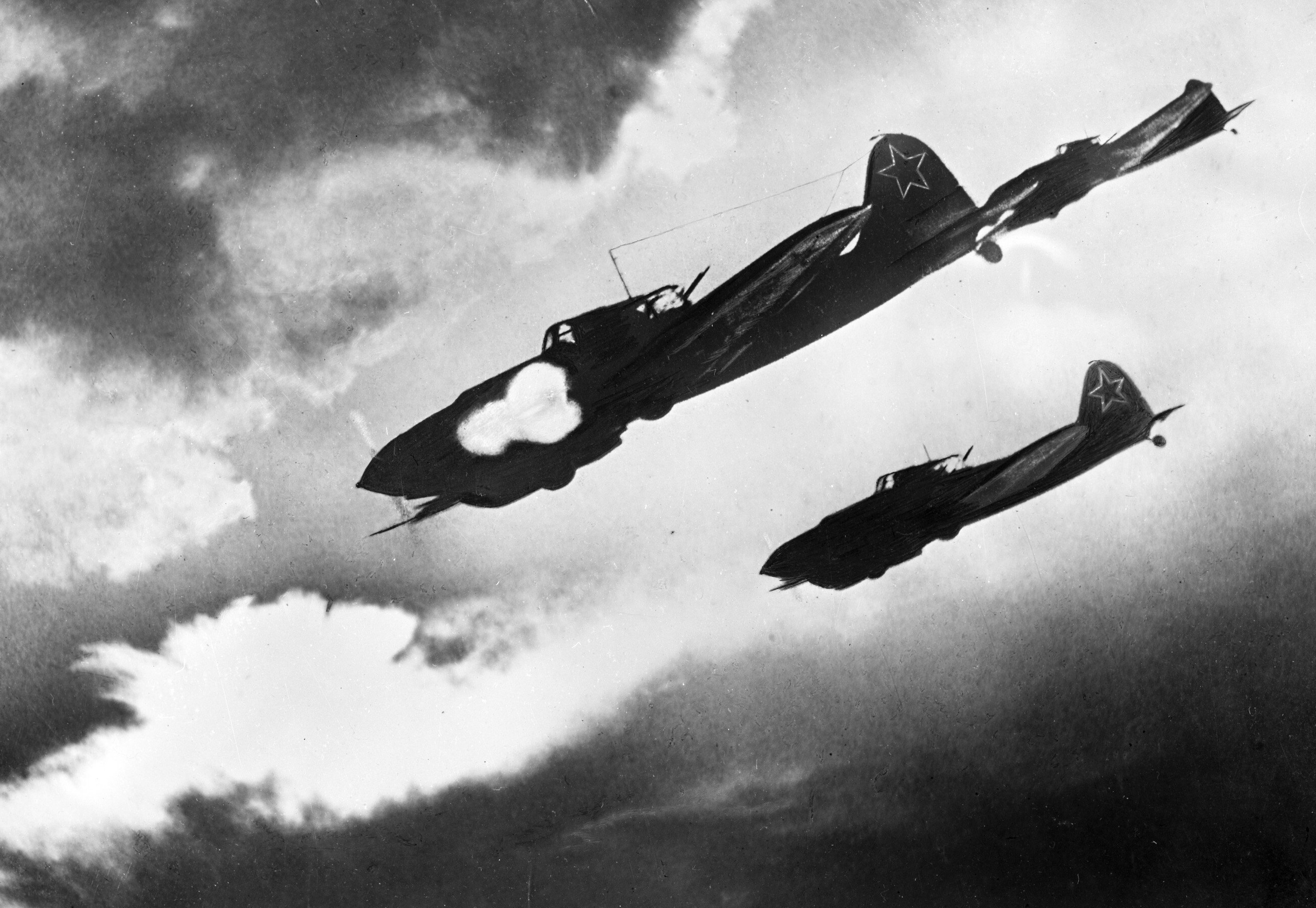
Ilyushin Il-2 attack aircraft in action during the Battle of Kursk in 1943. Olovyannikov first flew in combat during the battle, distinguishing himself and being awarded the Order of the Red Star.

On 26 October 1944, by decree of the Presidium of the Supreme Soviet of the USSR, Olovyannikov was awarded the title of Hero of the Soviet Union, number 4850, with the award of the Order of Lenin, number 21044, and the Gold Star medal. During the war he flew a total of 212 sorties, reaching the position of deputy squadron commander. His last sortie was on 7 May 1945, on the Baltic coast, in the region of Swinemunde. He avoided being shot down during his entire career.

== Post war career ==
Olovyannikov continued to serve in the Air Force after the war. He took the advanced officer training's higher tactical flight courses, graduating in 1950, and later studied at the Air Force Academy, graduating in 1956. He reached the rank of polkovnik, before retiring from military service in August 1962.

After leaving the Air Force, Olovyannikov went to work at the Moscow Institute of Petrochemical and Gas Industry. From 1963 to 1964 he was a laboratory assistant at the department of military special training, then training master of the department between 1964 and 1965, and again between 1966 and 1976, and 1977 and 1981. He was head of the personnel department between 1965 and 1966, head of the laboratory of the military department between 1976 and 1977, senior laboratory assistant of the department between 1981 and 1992, master of industrial training between 1992 and 1993, and engineer of the military department between 1993 and 1995. From 1963 until 1995 he was chairman of the party bureau of the institute's military department, and was for many years the permanent chairman of the Council of Veterans of the Institute.

Nikolai Olovyannikov lived in Moscow, where he died on 15 April 2021. He had been interviewed by Krasnaya Zvezda shortly before his death, with the interview appearing in the 9 December 2020 issue.

== Awards ==
Over his career Olovyannikov had received numerous honours and awards, besides the title of Hero of the Soviet Union and the award of the Order of Lenin on 26 October 1944. He held three Orders of the Red Banner, from 2 February 1944, 28 February 1945 and 25 May 1945, two Orders of the Patriotic War First Class from 12 July 1944 and 11 March 1985, two Orders of the Red Star from 8 October 1943 and 30 December 1956, the Medal "For Battle Merit" from 19 November 1951, the Medal "For the Capture of Königsberg", and a number of other medals of the USSR and Russia.
