= 371st Rifle Division =

371st Rifle Division (August 1941 – 1946)
- Active: 1941 - 1946
- Country: Soviet Union
- Branch: Red Army
- Type: Division
- Role: Infantry
- Engagements: Battle of Moscow; Battles of Rzhev; Battle of Smolensk (1943); Operation Bagration; Vitebsk–Orsha Offensive; Minsk Offensive; Gumbinnen Operation; Vistula-Oder Offensive; East Prussian Offensive; Heiligenbeil Pocket; Soviet invasion of Manchuria
- Decorations: Order of the Red Banner; Order of Suvorov; Order of Kutuzov
- Battle honours: Vitebsk

Commanders
- Notable commanders: Maj. Gen. Fyodor Vasileevich Chernyshev; Maj. Gen. Nikolay Oleshev; Maj. Gen. Vasilii Lavrentevich Alekseenko; Maj. Gen. Aleksandr Alekseevich Volkhin; Col. Arkadii Semyonovich Loginov

The 371st Rifle Division was raised in 1941 as a standard Red Army rifle division, and served for the duration of the Great Patriotic War in that role. It began forming in August 1941 in the Urals Military District. It was soon moved to the front lines near Moscow, and took part in the counteroffensive that began on December 5. It spent all of 1942 and the first months of 1943 in the fighting around the Rzhev salient, and after a short break served in the offensive that liberated Smolensk. After a winter of brutal combat on the approaches to Orsha and Vitebsk it was reassigned to 5th Army in 3rd Belorussian Front and took part in Operation Bagration, during which it was recognized for its role in the liberation of the latter city with a battle honor. The division was further distinguished in late July with the Order of the Red Banner for its part in the occupation of Vilnius. In January 1945, it fought its way into East Prussia, and as that campaign was winding down it was moved across Asia, along with the rest of 5th Army, to take part in the campaign against the Japanese Kwantung Army in Manchuria.

== Formation ==
The division began forming in August 1941 in the Urals Military District at Sverdlovsk. Its order of battle was as follows:

- 1229th Rifle Regiment
- 1231st Rifle Regiment
- 1233rd Rifle Regiment
- 930th Artillery Regiment
- 452nd Sapper Battalion
- 429th Reconnaissance Company
- 818th Signal Company
- 242nd Antitank Battalion (added in early 1942)

Col. Fyodor Vasileevich Chernyshev was assigned to command of the division on September 18, and he would remain in command until January 30, 1942, being promoted to the rank of major general on November 9. Later that month the division was assigned to the 39th Army and began moving towards the front. On November 29 it was reassigned to 30th Army in Western Front, arriving under those commands with no antitank battalion and with a signal company so short of training and equipment that it could not manage to advise Army headquarters of its arrival until December 1.

== Battle of Moscow ==
Disembarkation of the 371st, at Savelovo station, took place from December 2-5, after which it was concentrated in its designated area behind the Army's front. The 348th and 379th Rifle Divisions were also reinforcing 30th Army at this time. The Army went over to the offensive on the morning of December 6 along its entire front, overcoming stubborn enemy resistance. Its main force was in the center and on the left flank, and the division, backed by the 21st Tank Brigade, joined the 365th Rifle Division, backed by 8th Tank Brigade, commanded by Col. P. A. Rotmistrov, in a drive towards Klin. During the day they successfully advanced to within 12-15km north of that city. The offensive continued over the next two days and was threatening to cut the Klin - Leningrad road and envelop the city from the northeast. The defending German 7th Panzer and 14th Motorized Divisions were by now falling back. On the morning of December 12 the 371st repulsed a counterattack on its line near Selyukhino, 6-10km northeast of Klin. Over the next three days the Soviet objective was to encircle Klin to destroy the German forces defending it, but cooperation between 30th and 1st Shock Armies was difficult to maintain. On December 13 the division crushed enemy resistance in the Praslovo area with two of its rifle regiments and broke into the northern outskirts of Klin. In the end, most of the defenders were able to withdraw, with heavy losses, and the city was liberated on December 15 by the 371st and 365th Divisions and their supporting troops. From December 9 to 15 the two Armies captured 82 tanks, 18 armored cars, 750 cars and trucks, 80 guns, 120 mortars, 250 machine guns, 800 submachine guns, up to 10,000 shells, and about 2 million small arms rounds.

=== Battles for Rzhev ===
30th Army continued its pursuit of the Third Panzer Group on December 16, and was transferred to Kalinin Front at noon. Beginning on January 8, 1942, 30th Army took part in the Sychyovka-Vyasma Offensive Operation, which was planned "to encircle, and then capture or destroy the enemy's entire Mozhaisk - Gzhatsk - Vyasma grouping", that is, what later became known as the Rzhev salient. On January 21 the Front commander, Lt. Gen. I. S. Konev, ordered 30th Army to move from the Front's left flank to its right; this brought it to a position facing south at the north end of the salient, near Rzhev itself, where it would remain for most of the ongoing fighting. By the end of January the successful part of the Soviet counteroffensive had mostly come to an end, in part because most of the rifle regiments had been reduced to 80 - 120 men each. On January 31, General Chernyshev handed his command to Col. Nikolai Viktorovich Yagodkin, who in turn was succeeded on February 19 by Col. Nikolai Nikolaevich Oleshev.

According to STAVKA High Command Directive No. 170182 to the commander of Kalinin Front, dated March 22:

"2. Withdraw from the Kalinin Front into the Reserve of the Supreme High Command... (b)in the period from 20 April to 30 April of this year the [following] rifle divisions from the 30th Army: 371st Rifle Division - to Kalinin, 375th Rifle Division - to Likhoslavl for refitting, resupplying and collective combat training."

As of May 1 the division was back under command of 30th Army. Beginning on July 30 the rejuvenated division took part in the First Rzhev–Sychyovka Offensive Operation, eventually advancing to the southeast of Rzhev in very difficult fighting while the neighboring 29th and 31st Armies made significant gains on the east flank of the salient. In August the 371st was transferred to 31st Army in Western Front. 31st Army resumed the offensive at 0545 hours on August 24, but now progress became much more difficult, and on September 5 General Konev, now commanding Western Front, recommended a halt to rest, refit and organize a new attack to envelop and capture Rzhev, but instead the assault was renewed four days later. On September 16 the Army temporarily suspended its attacks, but resumed on September 21-23 with its three right-flank divisions, including the 371st. By the end of the month the 31st had gone over to the defensive. From August 4 to September 15 it had suffered 43,321 killed, wounded and missing-in-action.

In part due to these massive casualties, 31st Army played a limited role in the Second Rzhev–Sychyovka Offensive Operation (Operation Mars). On the first day, three divisions on its left flank attacked out of its bridgehead over the Osuga River and were stopped cold with up to 50 percent casualties. The 371st escaped this carnage, and 31st Army played no further active role in the offensive.

On February 14, 1943, Colonel Oleshev was promoted to the rank of major general. On March 2, as Army Group Center put its evacuation of the Rzhev salient, Operation Büffel, into effect, 31st Army began its role in the difficult and costly pursuit until the end of the month. On May 13 General Oleshev was moved up to command of the 36th Rifle Corps, being replaced by Col. Usman Minibaevich Sakaev. At about the same time the division was moved back to the reserves of Western Front for rest and rebuilding, where it would remain until August. On June 22 Colonel Sakaev was in turn replaced by Col. Vasilii Lavrentevich Alekseenko.

== Battles for Orsha and Vitebsk ==
During August the 371st returned to the front in 49th Army of Western Front, in time to take part in the battles that liberated Smolensk. By October 1 it had been reassigned to the 70th Rifle Corps of 33rd Army, facing elements of the German IX Army Corps. After nearly two months of attacking, by this time the division's rifle regiments had been reorganized with just two battalions each, but the 930th Artillery Regiment remained at full strength, so the division was still combat effective.

On October 3, Western Front began the first of a series of ill-fated offensives in the direction of Orsha. The 371st and its corps-mate, 338th Rifle Division, were deployed on the army's right wing between Lenino and Mikulino facing the German 95th Infantry Division. 33rd Army's attack faced stronger German defenses than its neighboring armies to the north, and by October 9 its assaults expired without any success. Over the following days 33rd and 49th Armies regrouped for a new offensive; the 338th remained in place for several days to conceal and protect the movements behind its lines, while the 371st moved into 33rd Army's second echelon in position to exploit any breakthrough. The new assault, which included the action known as the Battle of Lenino, began on October 12 but was once again stymied with limited gains and significant casualties, especially among the ranks of the Polish 1st Infantry Division. As there was no breakthrough the 371st saw little action.

By November 14 the division, along with its Corps, had been redeployed to 31st Army, north of the Dniepr River, still on the Orsha axis. After a lengthy artillery preparation on this date, four armies of Western Front made yet another attack to the west. Assault and penal battalions of 10th Guards Army to its north advanced up to 2.5 km despite heavy fog that shrouded the battlefield; the 338th kept pace with an advance of up to 1.5 km, but the 371st and the remaining divisions of the Army bogged down in the German forward security belt due to heavy machine gun fire. On November 17, 70th Corps, along with 15th Guards Rifle Corps spearheaded by units of 2nd Guards Tank Corps, wedged into the boundary between 78th Assault and 25th Panzer Grenadier Divisions north of the Orsha highway, but this attack also faltered. In five days of intense fighting the two Soviet armies managed to advance a mere 4 - 5 km, while the remainder of the Front's forces gained even less.

=== Vitebsk Offensives ===
Following this fighting the division was moved back to the reserves of Western Front for further rest and rebuilding. Given the lack of success in the Orsha direction the Front commander, Gen. V. D. Sokolovski, chose to make his next efforts towards Vitebsk, which was partly encircled and threatened to the north and west by 1st Baltic Front. 33rd Army began this offensive on December 23 and made relatively good progress in the first days, reaching towards the Vitebsk - Orsha highway. During a brief pause for regrouping the 371st was released from reserve to join 36th Rifle Corps on January 2, 1944, and was committed at the junction of 199th and 274th Rifle Divisions to spearhead the advance on Sosnovka. The assault had begun in a blizzard the previous day, and over the next five days the shock group penetrated about a kilometer, forcing 3rd Panzer Army to commit its 131st Infantry Division from reserve. Despite this the 199th and 371st liberated Gribuny, reaching to within rifle shot distance of the highway, while the 274th captured a small section of the highway before being halted by counterattacks.

After regrouping 33rd Army renewed its offensive on January 8. 36th Corps formed the shock group, and was ordered to attack the Feldherrnhalle Panzergrenadier Division and the 131st Infantry on a 6 km front between Gribuny and Maklaki at the western tip of the salient, between 12 and 16 km south-southeast of Vitebsk. The 371st was in the first echelon, which was backed by the 2nd and 23rd Guards Tank Brigades. After all the previous fighting the divisions and brigades of Western Front were at about 40 percent strength. Despite this, 36th Corps made significant initial progress; while the 199th failed to capture its first objective, the 371st, 274th and 95th Divisions surged forward through the defenses of Feldherrnhalle. In two days of heavy fighting the 371st crushed a small salient held by the 2nd Battalion of its Fusilier Regiment, crossed the Vitebsk - Orsha highway, and took the eastern outskirts of the village of Miakovo, 2 km deep in the German defenses. To its left, its corps-mates made even greater gains, and by the end of January 10 Col. Gen. V. N. Gordov, commander of 33rd Army, was prepared to exploit the breakthrough if a bridgehead could be forced over the Luchesa River. However, by this time the German forces were beginning to react to the near-crisis. Elements of the 131st Infantry were shifted south to hit the division in its right flank. This served to deny its complete capture of Miakovo and the crossing of the Luchesa on this sector. To the south, the 299th Infantry Division arrived from 2nd Army to bolster Feldherrnhalle, and by late on January 14 the offensive ground to a halt; the divisions of 36th Corps had been reduced to between 2,500 - 3,500 men each.

Yet another attack was ordered for February 3. Sokolovski had been directed to drive directly on Vitebsk, rather than enveloping the city; for this to succeed the Luchesa would have to be forced, a task which fell to the 81st and 36th Rifle Corps. The 371st was in second echelon of its Corps, which was to attack on a 5 km sector from south of Gribuny southward to Sheliai. Despite a shortage of artillery ammunition, the lead divisions of the Corps, supported by a brigade of 2nd Guards Tank Corps, tore a gaping hole in the defenses of the 131st Infantry, advanced 1 - 2 km, captured two village strongpoints and approached the river north and south of Perevoz. However, a German grouping continued to hold a small bridgehead on the east bank, which was soon reinforced and threatened the flank of the advance. On the next day, General Gordov ordered the second echelon divisions, including the 371st, into the struggle for the river line, which seesawed back and forth for three days, with progress measured only in hundreds of metres before the effort faltered on February 7. A further 5 days of combat beginning on the 8th proved utterly futile. The 371st was able to compress, but failed to eliminate, 131st Infantry's bridgehead at and north of Karpovichi.

On February 22, Colonel Alekseenko was promoted to the rank of major general. At about the same time his division was regrouped into 65th Rifle Corps, still in 33rd Army. A new offensive began on February 28, once again seeking to force the Luchesa. The objective for the 371st and 199th Divisions was to take the German bridgehead at Noviki, cross the river and capture Sosnovka. Just as the offensive was beginning, 3rd Panzer Army pulled back its lines north of Vitebsk to free up reserves. The 371st was able to capture the bridgehead, and the 199th helped to gain a foothold of its own on the west bank, but the enemy reserves brought the overall offensive to a halt by March 5. On March 7 General Alekseenko left command of the division to Col. Fyodor Fyodorovich Shishov. By April 1 it had returned to 36th Rifle Corps.

=== Operation Bagration ===
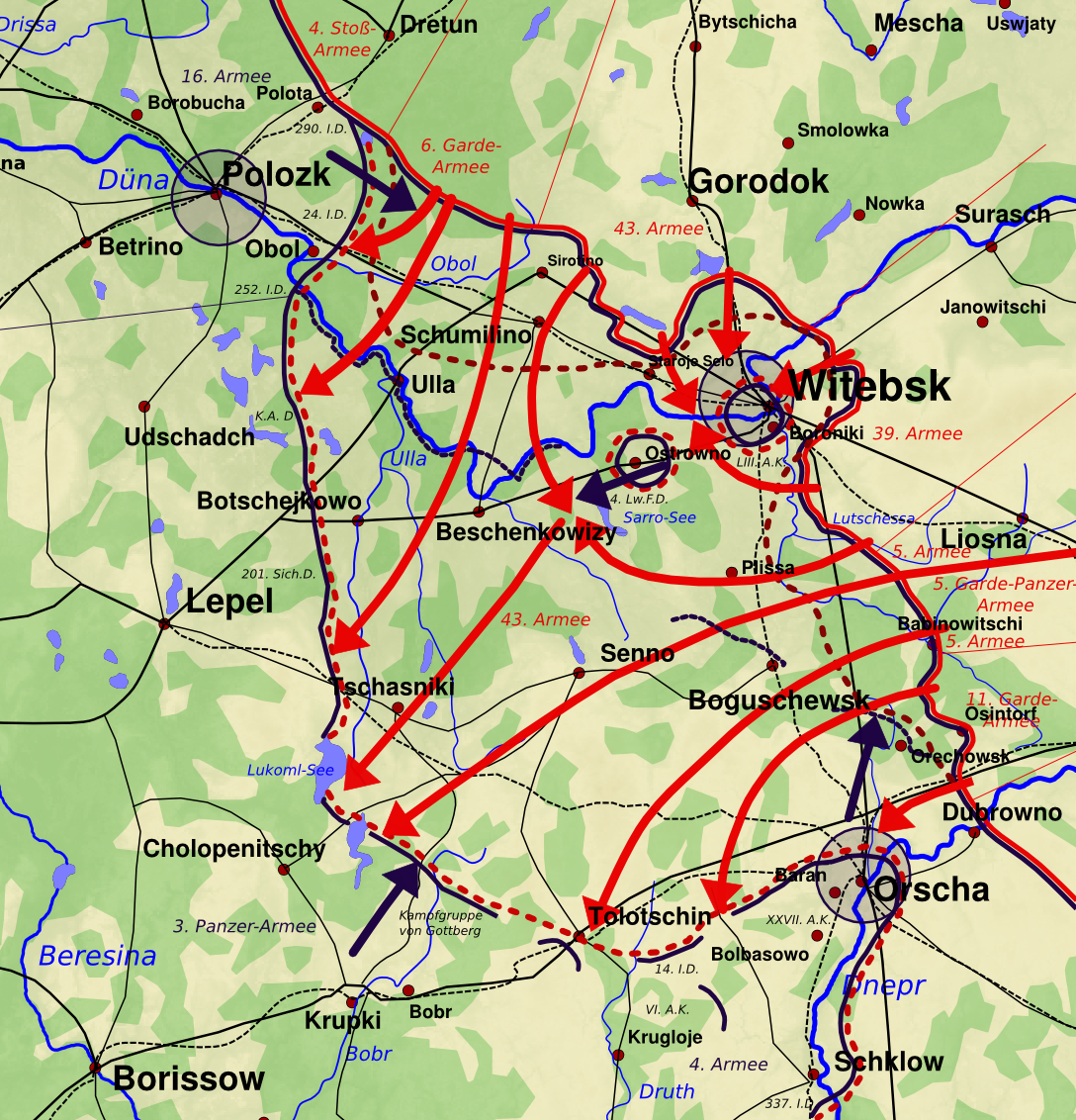
Vitebsk-Orsha Offensive.

Later that month the 371st was assigned to 5th Army in the newly created 3rd Belorussian Front, and it remained in that Army for the duration of the war. In May it was returned to 65th Rifle Corps, and it was under these commands at the start of the Soviet summer offensive. On May 4 General Alekseenko returned to command of the division. The immediate objective of 5th Army was to encircle the forces of 3rd Panzer Army in Vitebsk from the south. The main attack on June 22 was preceded by a two-hour-and-twenty-minute artillery and air bombardment against the German 256th and 299th Infantry Divisions; when the attack went in the division was in the first echelon and formed one of the focal points, along with the 277th Rifle Division. This lead element had the 2nd Guards Tank Brigade, plus the 395th Guards Heavy (ISU-152s) and the 343rd Guards (ISU-122s) Self-Propelled Artillery Regiments in support. Altogether the 65th and 72nd Rifle Corps hammered 18 km of the German line on the Chernitsa River. 65th Corps faced two regiments of the 299th Division, and by the afternoon the 371st, flanked by the 97th Rifle Division, had gained 2.5 km, driving through the center of the German VI Army Corps' position and reaching the second zone of defense. By day's end they had advanced as much as 4 km and established bridgeheads across the Sukhodrovka River, which was bridged overnight. The advance continued the next day, assisted by heavy artillery and air attacks. By 1300 hours, despite the arrival of German reinforcements, elements of 5th Army had crossed the rail line to Orsha. On the 24th the 371st and the 97th Divisions continued their attack and broke through the third German position, advancing a further 10 km. VI Corps was completely broken this day, with part of its remnants falling back to Bogushevsk, although that town was also cleared by noon the next day, during which 5th Army advanced another 20 km. Overnight on June 25/26 the Vitebsk salient was finally encircled, and the first Soviet troops crossed the Dvina and entered the city. By this time the 65th Corps was advancing well to the west in the direction of Chereya, but the division was recognized for its role in the long and bloody fighting as follows:

VITEBSK... 371st Rifle Division (Maj. Gen. Alekseenko, Vasilii Lavrentevich)... The troops who participated in the liberation of Vitebsk, by the order of the Supreme High Command of June 26, 1944, and a commendation in Moscow, are given a salute of 20 artillery salvoes from 224 guns.

The 1233rd Rifle Regiment (Maj. Barinov, Timofei Alekseevich) was awarded the same honorific by the same decree.

By the morning of June 30 the advanced detachment of 65th Corps was across the Berezina River north of Borisov and was pushing west without opposition. At this point the first phase of the offensive on this part of the front was suspended as the slower elements needed time to catch up. On July 1 General Alekseenko again left his command, being replaced four days later by Col. Samuil Ilich Tsukarev.

=== Minsk Offensive ===
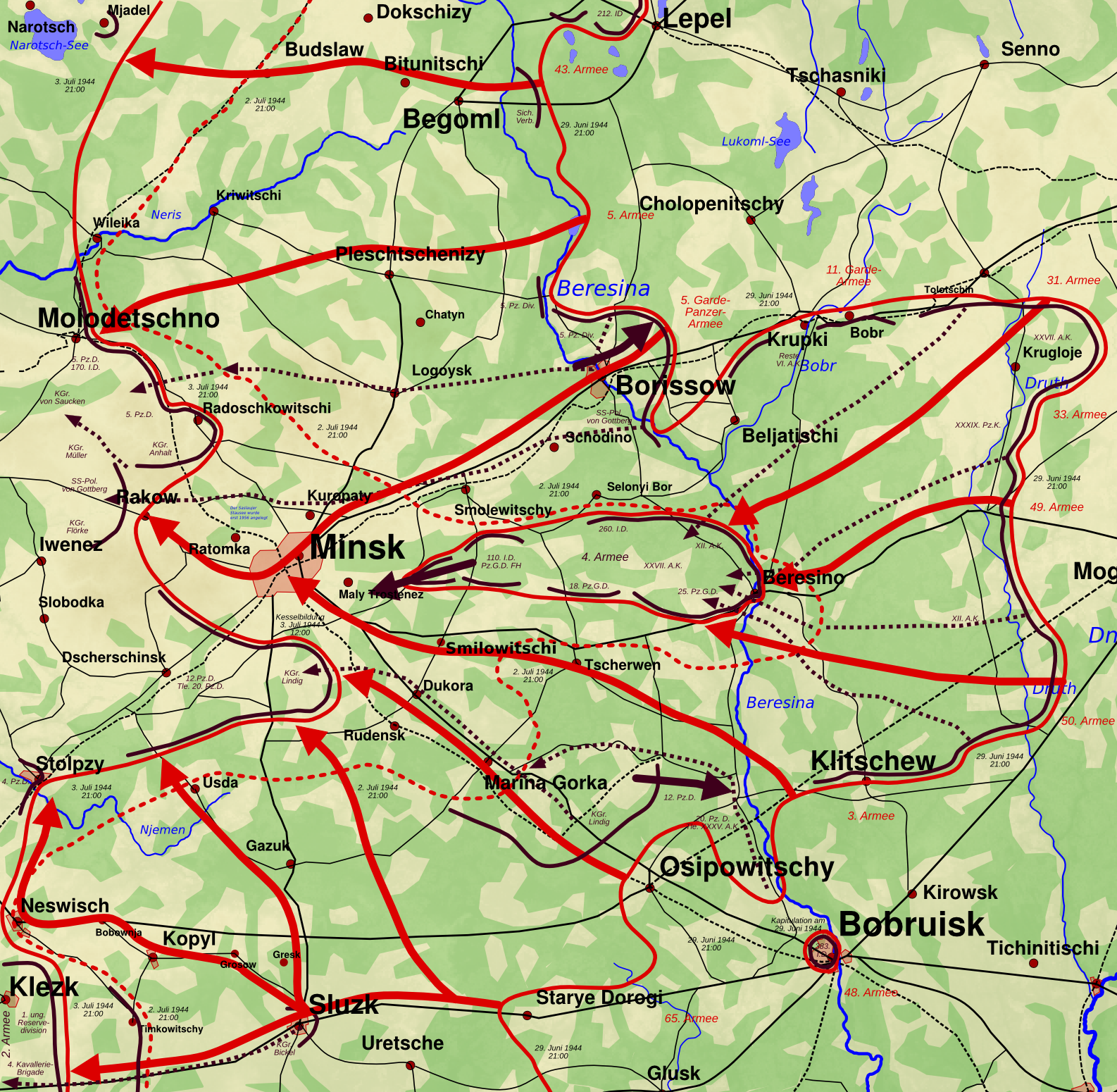
Minsk Offensive

During July 1 the 65th and 72nd Corps advanced roughly 10km - 14km. Minsk was largely liberated on July 3 as the 371st advanced with its Corps on the Maladzyechna axis. By July 6 the 5th Army had reached and forced the Viliya River from the march and ran up against the proposed German "East Wall" along the west bank of the Ashmyanka River. With few troops to defend it the position was soon overcome by the 3rd Guards Mechanized Corps, in close coordination with 65th Rifle Corps, in the Soly area along the Smarhonʹ–Vilnius railway and overnight the pursuit continued in the direction of the latter place. On July 8 the 65th, 72nd and 3rd Guards Mechanized Corps were all engaged in street fighting for the city. The German garrison was completely isolated on July 10 and broken into two groups by the 65th and 3rd Guards Corps. In a desperate effort to rescue the garrison 600 men of the 2nd Parachute Division were dropped west of Vilnius but most of these were quickly defeated and rounded up.

On July 25 the 371st was recognized for its part in the occupation of Vilnius with the award of the Order of the Red Banner. Weeks later, on August 12, the division was further recognized for its part in forcing a crossing of the Neman with the award of the Order of Suvorov, 2nd Degree. The 1231st Rifle Regiment also received the name of that river as a battle honor. On August 21 Colonel Tsukarev was transferred to command of the 97th Rifle Division and General Alekseenko returned again to command on August 24.

== Into East Prussia ==
General Alekseenko made his final departure on November 9, being replaced by Maj. Gen. Aleksandr Alekseevich Volkhin. Four days later, both the 1229th Rifle Regiment and the 930th Artillery Regiment were awarded the Order of the Red Banner for their roles in the battles along the border of East Prussia.

At the start of the Vistula-Oder Offensive on January 12, 1945, 5th Army was tasked with a vigorous attack in the direction of Mallwischken and Gross Skeisgirren, with the immediate task of breaking through the enemy defense, then encircling and destroying the Tilsit group of forces in conjunction with the 39th Army. Progress proved slower than expected, with the German forces putting up fierce resistance. On the morning of January 14, 5th Army broke through the enemy's fourth trench line, and began to speed up the advance until the early afternoon, when heavy German counterattacks began. 65th Corps, with 97th and 144th Rifle Divisions in the first echelon and 371st in the second, faced tank and infantry attacks from the 5th Panzer Division, which slowed, but did not halt, the advance.

The assault began to pick up tempo on the 17th. After consolidating the former German strongpoint at Radschen the 45th and 65th Corps reached a line 3 km east of Brakupenen. By now the German forces that had been thrown out of the Gumbinnen defensive line's main positions were conducting a fighting withdrawal to the west, throwing their last reserves into battle. Heavy fighting continued into January 19, as 65th Corps reached the approaches to the German strongpoint at Rudstannen; during this period operations on the front of 39th Army were developing more successfully and most of the Front's reserves were redirected there. On January 21, 5th Army was directed to encircle and destroy the German grouping defending Insterburg in conjunction with 11th Guards Army on the following day; 65th Corps was to attack towards Karlswalde. By 0600 hours on January 22 the town had been completely cleared. During the following week the Army continued to attack in the direction of Zinten. On January 29, 65th Corps turned its sector north of Friedland over to 28th Army and was moved to the left flank of 45th Corps before beginning an attack to the south. The German forces continued to resist along the Heilsberg fortified line, and it was not until February 7 that 5th Army's forces were able to secure Kreuzburg.

General Volkhin had left his command on January 29 to take up the post of deputy commanding officer of 54th Rifle Corps, being replaced by Col. Arkadii Semyonovich Loginov, who would remain in command for the duration. On April 26 the 1231st Rifle Regiment was awarded the Order of Aleksandr Nevsky for its part in the battles southwest of Königsberg. By then, 5th Army had been removed to the Reserve of the Supreme High Command.

== Soviet invasion of Manchuria ==
As the war with Germany ended, the division, along with the rest of its Army, was moving to the far east of the USSR. By the end of June it was in the Maritime Group of the Far Eastern Front, which became the 1st Far Eastern Front at the beginning of August. 5th Army was tasked with making the Front's main attack. It had its three rifle corps deployed abreast, with the 65th Corps on the right flank and the 371st in second echelon. When the attack began on August 9, it struck the Kuanyuehtai (Volynsk) center of resistance, which was held by one battalion of the Japanese 273rd Infantry Regiment of the 124th Infantry Division. The lead divisions enveloped the northern portions of the Japanese strongpoint, leaving isolated units in the rear for the 371st to deal with. By day's end, 5th Army had torn a gap 35 km wide in the Japanese lines and had advanced anything from 16 - 22 km into the enemy rear. Within three days the second echelon forces, backed by self-propelled artillery, had liquidated all remaining strongholds. By August 13 the lead elements of the division were advancing to meet its corps-mates on the road to Mudanjiang. This city was taken after a two-day battle on August 15 - 16, after which 5th Army advanced southwestward towards Ning'an, Tunghua and Kirin. On August 18 the Japanese capitulation was announced, and 5th Army deployed to accept and process the surrendering units.

== Postwar ==
On September 19 the division and its subunits were awarded their final decorations. The 1229th Rifle Regiment received the Order of Suvorov, 3rd degree; the 1233rd Rifle Regiment was given the Order of Aleksandr Nevsky; and the division as a whole was awarded the Order of Kutuzov, 2nd degree, in general recognition of its successes in the Manchurian campaign. At this point it carried the full title of 371st Rifle, Vitebsk, Order of the Red Banner, Orders of Suvorov and Kutuzov Division (Russian: 371-я стрелковая Витебская Краснознамённая орденов Суворова и Кутузова дивизия). The division was disbanded between June and August 1946, still part of the corps, and its personnel used to reinforce the 144th Rifle Division and other 5th Army units.
