= 375th Rifle Division =

375th Rifle Division (August, 1941 – 1946)
- Active: 1941 - 1946
- Country: Soviet Union
- Branch: Red Army
- Type: Division
- Role: Infantry
- Engagements: Battle of Moscow; Battles of Rzhev; Sychyovka-Vyazma Offensive; First Rzhev–Sychyovka Offensive Operation; Operation Mars; Battle of Kursk; Belgorod-Kharkov Offensive Operation; Battle of the Dniepr; Battle of the Korsun–Cherkassy Pocket; Uman–Botoșani Offensive; First Jassy-Kishinev Offensive; Second Jassy-Kishenev Offensive; Siege of Budapest; Vienna Offensive
- Decorations: Order of the Red Banner
- Battle honours: Kharkov; Bucharest

Commanders
- Notable commanders: Maj. Gen. Vasilii Grigorevich Vorontsov; Maj. Gen. Nikolai Aleksandrovich Sokolov; Maj. Gen. Pyotr Dmitrievich Govorunenko; Maj. Gen. Vasilii Dmitrievich Karpukhin

The 375th Rifle Division was raised in 1941 as an infantry division of the Red Army, and served for the duration of the Great Patriotic War in that role. It began forming in August, 1941 in the Urals Military District. It reached the fighting front in December, coming under command of the 29th Army in the vicinity of the Rzhev salient and it took part in the bloody and tragic battles for this heavily-fortified position until March, 1943, mostly as part of 30th Army. Following the German evacuation of the salient the 375th got a brief spell in reserve before being reassigned to Voronezh Front in the buildup to the Battle of Kursk. When the offensive began it held a crucial sector on the extreme left flank of 6th Guards Army where the II SS Panzer Corps attempted to break through south of the salient. Following the German defeat the division joined in the counteroffensive towards Kharkov in August and won its first battle honor. It continued to advance through Ukraine and into Romania over the next eight months, being brought to a halt east of Iași in the spring of 1944. In late August the 2nd and 3rd Ukrainian Fronts crushed the defending German and Romanian forces, and on the last day of the month the 375th played a leading role in the capture of the Romanian capital, Bucharest; it won its second battle honor and two of its rifle regiments were awarded decorations. For the duration of the war the division fought its way through Romania and Hungary, finally advancing into Austria with 7th Guards Army. Its record of admirable service was capped with the award of the Order of the Red Banner soon following the German surrender, but it was nevertheless disbanded shortly thereafter.

== Formation ==
Like the 373rd Rifle Division, the 375th began forming in August, 1941 in the Urals Military District at Kamyshlov in the Sverdlovsk Oblast, based on the first wartime shtat (table of organization and equipment) for rifle divisions. Its order of battle was as follows:

- 1241st Rifle Regiment
- 1243rd Rifle Regiment
- 1245th Rifle Regiment
- 932nd Artillery Regiment
- 244th Antitank Battalion (from May 13, 1942)
- 431st Reconnaissance Company
- 436th Sapper Battalion
- 820th Signal Battalion (later 84th Signal Company)
- 454th Medical/Sanitation Battalion
- 447th Chemical Protection (Anti-gas) Company
- 484th Motor Transport Company
- 223rd Field Bakery
- 792nd Divisional Veterinary Hospital
- 1443rd Field Postal Station
- 742nd Field Office of the State Bank

Maj. Gen. Vasilii Grigorevich Vorontsov was assigned to command of the division on September 1, and he would remain in this post until February 27, 1942. The division was briefly assigned to the 28th Reserve Army in November, but when it arrived at the front in late December it came under command of the 29th Army in Kalinin Front.

== Battles for Rzhev ==
The Sychevka-Vyasma Offensive Operation, which was planned "to encircle, and then capture or destroy the enemy's entire Mozhaisk - Gzhatsk - Vyasma grouping", began the fighting for what later became known as the Rzhev salient. On January 12, 1942, 29th Army entered a breach created by 39th Army in the German positions west of the city and began advancing in its direction. However, at some point in January the 375th was transferred to 30th Army and so avoided the fate of the 29th, which was encircled and mostly destroyed in February. After a complex regrouping 30th Army began attacking southwards, west of Rzhev, before the end of January in an attempt to join up with the 29th. During February and March the 30th was ordered into repeated attacks to help eliminate the German grouping around Olenino, with little success. On February 28 Maj. Gen. Nikolai Aleksandrovich Sokolov took over command of the division from General Vorontsov.

=== First Rzhev–Sychyovka Offensive Operation ===
Flamethrower teams of the 1245th Rifle Regiment with FOG-2 stationary equipment, summer 1942

According to STAVKA High Command Directive No. 170182 to the commander of Kalinin Front, dated March 22:

"2. Withdraw from the Kalinin Front into the Reserve of the Supreme High Command... (b)in the period from 20 April to 30 April of this year the [following] rifle divisions from the 30th Army: 371st Rifle Division - to Kalinin, 375th Rifle Division - to Likhoslavl for refitting, resupplying and collective combat training."

As of May 1 the division was held in Kalinin Front reserves, where it remained as of June 1; by the start of July it was back in the lines as part of 58th Army, still in the same Front.

The new offensive, which began on July 30 on Kalinin Front's sector, did not include 58th Army. On August 1 the Army only had the 375th and the 27th Guards Rifle Divisions under command, and was disbanded later in the month, at which point the division rejoined 30th Army, which was now in Western Front but still operating north of Rzhev. The offensive had begun in a promising manner for 30th Army, which broke through on a 9 km front to a depth of 6 – 7 km on the first day. Then heavy rains began and continued for several days which caused the attack to literally bog down in the area of Polunino, north of Rzhev. The arrival of fresh forces, including the 375th, allowed the Army to finally take Polunino on August 21 and then to plan a new attempt to take Rzhev in cooperation with the rebuilt 29th Army. On August 25/26 the 30th reached the Volga 5 to 6 km west of the city and on the 29th established a bridgehead on the right bank, but over the following weeks was unable to actually capture and clear Rzhev. During August the Army lost more than 80,000 men in this fighting. Through September repeated attacks gained several blocks in the northeast of the city at the cost of nearly 20,000 more casualties. On October 1, 30th Army finally went over to the defense.

=== Operation Mars ===
On October 4 General Sokolov died of an unstated illness. He was replaced two days later by Col. Pyotr Dmitrievich Govorunenko, who would remain in command until December 6, 1943. Due to the very heavy losses it had suffered in the summer fighting 30th Army was not given an offensive role in the Second Rzhev–Sychyovka Offensive Operation (Operation Mars). However in the last stages of the offensive, after the Red Army attacks had failed on all other sectors, the 39th Army was still making limited gains in its diversionary efforts in the Molodoi Tud sector northeast of Olenino. By the second week of December Gen. G. K. Zhukov was looking for any success anywhere in his collapsing offensive and on December 8 ordered his 39th and 30th Armies once again to crush the enemy Olenino grouping, while the 30th was also to break through on a sector from Koshkino to Burgovo and capture Rzhev by the 23rd. In preparation the 375th, with the 380th and 220th Rifle Divisions in support, pounded the German defenses south of the Volga. From December 9 to 12 this effort failed to make any progress, while 39th Army had gained some ground near the village of Gonchuki. Therefore the 220th and 16th Guards Rifle Divisions were transferred to this sector, bringing the attacks from the Volga bridgeheads to an effective halt. Meanwhile German counterattacks had cut off a large Soviet mobile group south of Gonchuki and late on the 12th the 375th was also moved westward to help restore the situation. On the next day the division, joined by the 380th, the 49th Mechanized Brigade, plus several tank brigades and regiments, struck the defenses of the German 87th Infantry Division between Koshkino and Burgovo. While the tanks managed to penetrate the forward line in several places, enemy fire separated the infantry support, leading to just minor gains. Intense fighting continued until December 17, with the "damaged" 375th being shifted to the Gonchuki sector. Finally General Zhukov ordered this last gasp of Operation Mars to stop on December 23.

== Battle of Kursk ==
On the first day of 1943 the 375th remained part of 30th Army in Western Front but this would soon change. At this time soon-to-be Marshal Zhukov was planning Operation Polyarnaya Zvezda, an ambitious plan to drive Army Group North away from Leningrad. Under STAVKA Order No. 46026 of January 31, the division is listed as one of ten to be redeployed to Northwestern Front. Before this could get underway, on February 5 STAVKA issued a new directive to establish the Central Front by February 15 under command of Col. Gen. K. K. Rokossovski, with the 375th as one of the rifle divisions assigned. Within days it became part of the 21st Army, and by February 23 it was unloaded from its trains and was in the Kalinino region about 15 km east of Livny.

The STAVKA issued a directive on March 7 for a combined offensive by Central, Briansk and Western Fronts in the direction of Oryol. Rokossovski ordered four divisions of 21st Army, including the 375th, to begin to advance on March 10, in cooperation with the new 70th Army. By this time, however, the German 2nd and 2nd Panzer Armies were regaining their balance and starting to cover the massive gap in the front. 21st Army reached the Fatezh area by the 11th, but by now news was arriving that Army Group South's offensive against Voronezh Front was threatening to retake Kharkov, and the Army was redirected to the south to join that Front. 21st Army was redesignated as the 6th Guards Army on April 16, and by the end of the month the 375th would be assigned to the new 23rd Guards Rifle Corps.

=== Operation Citadel ===
In the buildup to the German summer offensive, the 375th was given a particularly challenging task; it formed the left flank of the first echelon of 6th Guards Army, tying in with the right flank 81st Guards Rifle Division of 7th Guards Army. Since unit boundaries are usually seen as weak points in any defense, the Front commander, Army Gen. N. F. Vatutin, aimed to turn this to his advantage by heavily fortifying and reinforcing the two flank divisions in anticipation of the enemy attack. They were deployed with swampy terrain, the confluence of the Northern and Lipovyi Donets Rivers, in their rear, and by the start of the offensive had 19-23 artillery pieces (76mm calibre or larger) per kilometre, greater than any other sector of the front. And the entire boundary was backstopped by 69th Army in third echelon.

As the anticipated attack grew closer, the Soviet forces became desperate for hard information on the start date. Reconnaissance patrols were sent out by all the front-line divisions, without results. Finally, before noon on July 4, word came up the line of communications that a patrol of the 375th had captured a combat engineer of the 168th Infantry Division who was lifting mines between the front lines, and revealed that his division was to go on the offensive on the morning of July 5. He also stated he had seen many tanks in Belgorod.

On July 5, the first day of the offensive, the 375th faced the 3rd SS Panzer Division of II SS Panzer Corps. Despite the German objective to "crush" the Soviet defenses and seize crossings over the Lipovyi Donets, Vatutin's plan was working: the 3rd SS made almost no progress while the division continued to hold its deeply fortified positions. Among other assets the 375th had a platoon of tank-hunting dogs attached, but had no opportunity to deploy them. On the second day the 3rd SS again struck the division's positions beginning at 0600 hours but made few gains while the remainder of the Panzer Corps advanced as much as 20 km on the Prokhorovka axis. In order to stem this advance General Vatutin proposed a counterattack to begin on July 8 and to involve the 375th and many other forces, specifically the 1st Tank Army, but this was premature and never actually took place.

As the SS panzers continued to push towards Prokhorovka and Army Detachment Kempf began developing its advance against 7th Guards Army in the direction of Melikhovo on July 9, Vatutin became concerned that 69th Army could become encircled, and before noon ordered several divisions, including the 375th, to reinforce that Army along with several artillery units and maintain the defense of the Korocha axis. The 35th Guards Rifle Corps, which had only been formed in the past few weeks, took both the 375th and the 81st Guards under command. By the end of the day the enemy began closing a ring around the two divisions, plus two regiments of 92nd Guards Rifle Division, and 69th Army was forced at 2200 hours to begin withdrawing these forces to new lines. At 0145 on July 10 Colonel Govorunenko received the following coded telegram:

"1. Around 1430, the enemy in strength of up to 250 tanks attacked units of the 81st Guards Rifle Division in the area of Blizhniaia Igumenka and Postnikov and by day's end had taken Dalniaia Igumenka and Shishino. 2. I order: to withdraw rapidly in the direction of Kiselevo and by 0600 10.07.43 to take a defense [on the line]: Kiselevo to the southwest slopes of Hill 211.5 (excl.), Machine Tractor Station, west of Shliakhovoe, Sabynino. Task: to prevent a breakthrough of enemy infantry tanks in the direction of the sugar factory."

The sector now occupied by the division was part of the second Army-level defensive belt created during the spring. These reserve positions were important for both maintaining the physical defense but also the psychological defense in that the contingencies had been anticipated. A further order issued at 2330 hours withdrew the 375th into the 69th Army reserve.

As this withdrawal was taking place on July 11, 6th Panzer Division was finally able to push beyond Melikhovo and by that night seized a bridgehead over the Northern Donets at Rzhavets. This advance threatened the potential encirclement of the 48th Rifle Corps of 69th Army. The Corps leadership reacted quickly and already at 2245 hours Colonel Govorunenko was ordered to send one battalion with two antitank guns to Ryndinka "in order to cover Shakhovo from the direction of Kurakova and Rzhavets." By the morning of the 12th it appeared that Kempf's III Panzer Corps could be breaking through 69th Army into the rear of the 5th Guards Tank Army at Prokhorovka and Govorunenko was directed to commit one rifle regiment to a composite force to liquidate the breakthrough. 11th Guards Mechanized Brigade attacked Ryndinka from the north while the 1st and 2nd Battalions of the 1243rd Regiment held defensive positions southeast of Shakhovo and supported the attack with fire.

By this time it was clear that the plan for Operation Citadel had failed, and the forces of Army Group South would have to retreat. However, 48th Corps, clinging to its small piece of ground between the Northern and Lipovyi Donets, was still highly vulnerable to encirclement. Eliminating the Corps would be a consolation prize for the Germans and would secure a baseline for the inevitable withdrawal. As of July 10 the 48th Corps had about 40,000 personnel under command, but by the morning of the 13th had suffered considerable losses, especially in the antitank forces that faced 4th Panzer Army and III Panzer Corps. These German divisions launched converging attacks on the night of July 13/14. The 375th with the 183rd were holding the area south of the Belenikhino Station. On the evening of July 14 the situation of 48th Corps had become critical; it was mostly encircled, was suffering shortages of ammunition and antitank weapons, and communications with higher headquarters were being continually interrupted. By dawn on July 15 the pocket was closed but not solidly; four Soviet divisions, including the 375th, plus reinforcements were loosely held in an area of 126 square kilometres.

While Vatutin understood the situation and wished to maintain the position of the 48th Corps as a springboard for a counteroffensive, he didn't have enough strength. By the evening of July 14 there was only one option: to withdraw from the pocket as fast as possible. This did not go without complications, in particular for the 375th, which was the last to withdraw, covering the other divisions. Colonel Govorunenko wrote:

"On the approach to Kosinets, the enemy opened up artillery and mortar fire on the column in combination with a hail of machine gun and rifle fire from the east and west spurs of the Sukhaia Plota ravine... By 1130 [hours] the forward units were breaking through the ring of fire, losing a significant amount men, horses and weapons... The rearguard consisting of two reinforced rifle battalions didn't come out, and together with them the commander of the 1241st Rifle Regiment Major Karklin, the commander of the 1243rd Rifle Regiment Lieutenant Colonel Frolov, the signal chief Engineer-Captain Tsukasov, two battalion commanders, and a number of lower-ranking officers went missing in action. The division's personnel - 3,526 men - upon reaching the new line of defense at Novoselovka quickly adopted a combat formation, dug in, and repulsed two attacks."

On July 28 the division reported that as of July 20, 2,718 of its men were missing in action, all but a few of whom were killed or captured in the breakout. As of August 1 it remained in 48th Corps of 69th Army, which was now under command of Steppe Front.

=== Operation Rumyantsev ===
The 375th was sufficiently rebuilt by August 3 to be able to take part in the Belgorod-Kharkov Offensive Operation and played a role in the liberation of both of those cities, being awarded the name of the second as a battle honor:

"KHARKOV... 375th Rifle Division (Colonel Govorunenko, Pyotr Dmitrievich)... The troops who participated in the liberation of Kharkov, by the order of the Supreme High Command of August 23, 1943, and a commendation in Moscow, are given a salute of 20 artillery salvoes from 224 guns.

By September 1 the division had been moved to the 76th Rifle Corps in the reserves of Steppe Front. On the same date Colonel Govorunenko was promoted to the rank of major general.

== Advance in Ukraine ==
Later in the month the 375th was again reassigned, this time to the 74th Rifle Corps of 53rd Army. By the end of the day on September 28 much of this Army had reached the east bank of the Dniepr between the mouth of the Psyol River and the village of Drobetskovka. On the following day elements of the Army liberated the city of Kremenchug, while its left-flank forces seized Kryachok Island as well as an unnamed island at marker 65.7 and 60.9. On the night of September 30/October 1 the 53rd forced the Dniepr with elements of two rifle divisions and took a small bridgehead in the area southeast of Chikalovka, which was fought over throughout the day. The fighting for this bridgehead continued over the next few days as further forces were ferried across. During a regrouping on the night of October 5/6 the village of Uspenskoye was transferred from 37th Army to the 53rd.

On October 20 Steppe Front became the 2nd Ukrainian Front. By the end of the month the 375th had been reassigned to the 75th Rifle Corps, still in 53rd Army. By November 12 part of 53rd Army was in the bridgehead in the Dneprodzerzhinsk area, while the remainder was defending along the left (east) bank of the Dniepr. On December 6, General Govorunenko was wounded in action, and was replaced by Col. Pyotr Ivanovich Sviridov. This officer was in turn replaced on December 21 by Maj. Gen. Akim Vasilevich Yakshin, who had been serving as commander of the 1243rd Rifle Regiment. In the buildup to the Battle of the Korsun–Cherkassy Pocket the division was reassigned to the 20th Guards Rifle Corps in 4th Guards Army. Prior to the start of the offensive, on January 15, 1944, General Yashkin was removed from command and replaced the next day by Col. Nikita Efimovich Tsygankov.

During the offensive, which began on January 24, 4th Guards Army formed part of the inner ring of encirclement around the trapped German forces. By the beginning of February the 375th had been shifted yet again, now to the 21st Guards Rifle Corps of the same Army. By the beginning of March the division was back in the 53rd Army, now in the 49th Rifle Corps, and would remain under those commands for most of the rest of the year. On March 10, Maj. Gen. Vasilii Dmitrievich Karpukhin took command of the 375th, and would remain in this position for the duration of the war.

=== First Jassy-Kishinev Offensive ===
By April 1, after advancing through western Ukraine, 2nd Ukrainian Front was beginning to reach the Dniestr River. The 21st Guards Corps, supported on the left by 49th Corps, crossed the river on April 1 and 2 and began advancing against the 3rd Panzer Division's bridgehead defenses north of Susleni from the northeast and east. While this advance continued the 49th Corps attacked 3rd Panzer's right wing through April 4 and 5, but the 375th was in second echelon to the 1st Guards Airborne and 110th Guards Rifle Divisions and did not see much of this fighting. Susleni was taken on April 7, which drove the panzer troops south to even stronger defenses. On the 11th the continued joint operation of the two Soviet Corps captured the town of Molovata on the west bank; this gave room for the 375th to be regrouped across the Dniestr and also rendered the bridgehead held by XXXX Panzer Corps north of the Răut River untenable. It was abandoned overnight on April 12/13, while the 49th Corps took over a sector from Furceni on the Răut to Golerkani on the Dniestr.

The next objective for 53rd Army was the German bridgehead east of the Dniestr on the approaches to the cities of Dubăsari and Grigoriopol. 49th Corps had begun this advance on March 31, but had then been diverted to the fighting on the west bank. On April 13, with all three of the Corps' divisions west of the river, supported by 25th Guards Rifle Division, the advance resumed with heavy attacks on the German 282nd Infantry Division on the Golerkani sector. After two days of heavy fighting the German force withdrew southward to new defenses west of Dubăsari, but also received reinforcements from the 10th Panzergrenadier Division and Corps Detachment "F" which contained the Soviet advance. By this time the divisions of 53rd Army had fewer than 5,000 personnel each, and on April 18 the Front command ordered the Army over to the defense.

On May 6 the 53rd Army received orders to take part in a new offensive on Chișinău that was to be primarily conducted by forces of 3rd Ukrainian Front. 49th Corps was to commit one division, while the 375th and one other division were to remain on the defense on the Army's front westward to south of Orhei. In the event, the defeat inflicted on the right flank forces of 2nd Ukrainian Front in the Târgu Frumos area caused this offensive to be postponed and eventually cancelled.

== Advance Into the Balkans ==
In the buildup to the Second Jassy-Kishinev Offensive in early August the 53rd Army was regrouped out of the front line into Front reserves. 49th Corps was ordered to move from the Front's left flank to the center which required four daily marches. The plan called for the Army to be part of the exploitation force which would be released once the shock formations penetrated the German-Romanian front. Once this occurred the Army was to advance in the general direction of Vaslui and Focșani. The offensive opened on August 20, and on the next day at 1900 hours the 53rd began moving up to the positions that had been vacated by the advancing 52nd Army. The Army was then ordered to move to the area south of the road from Podu Iloaiei to Iași overnight on August 22/23. In the following days minimal forces of the 53rd Army were committed to the reduction of the trapped Axis grouping while its main effort focused on Bucharest and the oilfields at Ploiești.

On August 31 the 375th played a leading role in the capture of the Romanian capital and was recognized as follows:

"BUCHAREST... 375th Rifle Division (Maj. Gen. Karpukhin, Vasilii Dmitrievich)... 1241st Rifle Regiment (Lt. Col. Martirosyan, Saen Markorovich)... The troops who participated in the liberation of Bucharest, by the order of the Supreme High Command of August 31, 1944, and a commendation in Moscow, are given a salute of 24 artillery salvoes from 324 guns.

In addition the 1243rd Rifle Regiment was awarded the Order of the Red Banner and the 1245th received the Order of Bogdan Khmelnitsky, 2nd Degree.

Following its advance through Romania, on October 28 the left flank forces of 2nd Ukrainian Front, including 53rd Army, began an operation to defeat the German-Hungarian forces in and around Budapest. The main drive was carried out by 7th Guards and 46th Armies while the 53rd provided flank security. On October 29 the Army advanced up to 13 km and reached the outskirts of Polgár. By the morning of November 4 the 27th Army relieved the 53rd along the front from Polgár to Tiszafüred while it regrouped to force the Tisza River three days later. November 11 the Army's right flank corps began fighting for the southern outskirts of Füzesabony; the town did not finally fall until the 15th after which the Army commander was ordered to develop the offensive in the direction of Verpelét. On November 20 the 53rd reached the southeastern slopes of the Mátra Mountains between Gyöngyös and Eger where the Axis forces were able to organize a powerful defense which brought the advance to a halt until November 26. Two days later the 24th Guards Rifle Corps was transferred from 7th Guards Army, and the 375th was transferred to this Corps by the end of the month.

At the start of the second stage of the Budapest operation on December 5 the 53rd Army was holding positions from Eger to Lőrinci, still facing the defenses in the Mátra. The attack began at 1015 hours but during the day the Army advanced just 2 – 4 km in the difficult terrain. During the third stage, beginning on December 10, the 53rd advanced very little. On December 19 the Army was given the task of reaching the line from Veľký Krtíš to Nemce to Želiezovce in southern Slovakia. During this month the 375th was again assigned to the 49th Rifle Corps, but was finally moved to the 27th Guards Rifle Corps in 7th Guards Army in January, 1945.

In late April, 2nd Ukrainian Front continued to clear German forces from central Austria and southern Bohemia. On April 22 the commander of 27th Guards Corps, Maj. Gen. Evgenii Stepanovich Alekhin, was severely wounded in a sudden enemy air strike while directing combat in the fighting positions of his troops, in the vicinity of Mikulov. Alekhin was carried to an aid station of the 375th but died there of his wounds at 1800 hours. His adjutant, Petchenko, and his driver, Koshman, were killed in the same attack.

== Postwar ==
Immediately after the fighting stopped the personnel of the division shared the full title 375th Rifle, Kharkov-Bucharest Division (Russian: 375-я стрелковая Харьковско-Бухарестская дивизия), but on May 17 they were belatedly recognized for their role in the fighting for Malacky and nearby towns and were awarded the Order of the Red Banner.
