= Nikolay Oleshev =

Hero of the Soviet Union

Nikolay Nikolayevich Oleshev
- Native name: Николай Николаевич Олешев
- Born: 21 September 1902; Poshekhonye, Yaroslavl Governorate, Russian Empire
- Died: 2 November 1970 (aged 68) Riga
- Buried: Troyekurovskoye Cemetery
- Allegiance: Soviet Union
- Branch: Soviet Army
- Service years: 1918–1969
- Rank: Lieutenant general
- Commands: 371st Rifle Division; 36th Rifle Corps; 113th Rifle Corps; 14th Assault Army; 13th Army
- Conflicts: Russian Civil War; World War II; Battle of Kiev; Battles of Rzhev; Operation Suvorov; Operation Bagration; Baltic Offensive; East Prussian Offensive; Invasion of Manchuria
- Awards: Hero of the Soviet Union; Order of Lenin (3); Order of the Red Banner (4); Order of Suvorov, 2nd class; Order of Kutuzov, 2nd class; Order of Bogdan Khmelnitsky, 2nd class; Order of the Patriotic War, 1st class; Medal "For Courage"

Nikolay Nikolayevich Oleshev (Russian: Никола́й Никола́евич Олешев; 21 September 1902 – 2 November 1970) was a Soviet Army lieutenant general and Hero of the Soviet Union. Oleshev volunteered for the Red Army in 1918 and served in the Russian Civil War as a clerk at a field hospital. In late 1921 he became a Cheka officer. During the interwar period Oleshev was an officer in the Soviet Border Troops.

After graduating from a course at the Frunze Military Academy, he was chief of staff of the Southwestern Front composite border detachment during its retreat across Ukraine after Operation Barbarossa. In February 1942, he became commander of the 371st Rifle Division and fought in the Battles of Rzhev. In February 1943 Oleshev was promoted to Major general and became commander of the 36th Rifle Corps from May. He led the corps during Operation Suvorov and Operation Bagration. After the capture of Minsk, he was appointed the city's military commandant and oversaw cleanup operations in the city. He then became the commander of the 113th Rifle Corps and led it during the Baltic Offensive and East Prussian Offensive. Oleshev was promoted to lieutenant general in early May. During the summer the corps was transferred to the Far East and fought in the Soviet invasion of Manchuria in August. For his leadership in the offensive, Oleshev was awarded the title Hero of the Soviet Union.

After the war, he graduated from the Military Academy of the General Staff and led the 14th Assault Army in Chukotka and the 13th Army. Oleshev was the senior military adviser to the chief of combat training of the Bulgarian People's Army. He was the deputy commander of the Baltic Military District for combat training. Oleshev retired in 1969 and died in 1970 in Riga.

== Early life and Russian Civil War ==
Oleshev was born on 21 September 1903 in Poshekhonye in Yaroslavl Governorate in the family of a Kapellmeister in an artillery regiment. He graduated from a Parochial school and then the Cadet Corps in Moscow.

In November 1918, he volunteered for the Red Army. He was sent to the Yaroslavl Military Hospital. From May 1920 to November 1921 he was a clerk posted to the 283rd Field Hospital of 13th Army on the Southern Front.

== Interwar ==
In November 1921, Oleshev became a member of the 18th Rifle Division's Cheka-GPU Special Section. He became a cadet at the Tver Cavalry School in September 1923. After graduating in August 1926, Oleshev was sent to serve in the OGPU Border Troops. He served in the Western Siberia and the Primorsky areas. From October, Oleshev served successively as assistant chief and outpost commander, assistant commander of a border detachment and head of the mobile group and 51st Troitsevo Savskogo (Grodekovskogo) Border detachment. During this period he participated in battles against partisans. For his actions, Oleshev was awarded a silver watch by the OGPU. Between 1930 and 1931 he also fought in operations against partisans in the Transbaikal area. In May 1932, he became assistant chief of maneuver troops and senior commissioner of the 54th Nerchinsk Border Detachment. In August 1935, Oleshev became the head of the NKVD Transbaikal District's 7th Cavalry Regiment Regimental School for Junior Command Personnel. He joined the Communist Party of the Soviet Union in 1937. In January 1938, he became head of the 2nd department and chief of staff of the 64th Manghud Border Detachment. Oleshev was head of the 1st Staff Department in the Transbaikal District NKVD Border Troops Office.

In July 1940, Oleshev transferred to the NKVD Border Troops Kiev District Headquarters and a month later became the chief of the 2nd department of the 1st NKVD Kiev District Border Troops Division. In 1941, he graduated from the first year of a course at the Frunze Military Academy.

== World War II ==
When Operation Barbarossa began, Oleshev was stationed in western Ukraine. He was the chief of staff of the Southwestern Front Composite Border Detachment. During the retreat, the detachment was surrounded but managed to fight its way out of the Kiev Pocket. The detachment retreated through Proskurov, Vinnytsia and Bila Tserkva. In the fall Oleshev fought on the Western Front and in the defense of Bely. In February 1942, he became commander of the 30th Army's 371st Rifle Division. He led the division in the Battles of Rzhev. On 28 May 1942, he was awarded the Order of the Red Banner. He was awarded the Order of Kutuzov 2nd class on 30 January 1943. On 14 February 1943, Oleshev was promoted to Major-general.

In May 1943, Oleshev was appointed commander of 31st Army's 36th Rifle Corps. The corps captured Smolensk and Yartsevo during the Battle of Smolensk in summer 1943. In June 1944, the corps fought in Operation Bagration, capturing Orsha and Dubroŭna. On 3 July, he was appointed military commandant of Minsk and oversaw the clearing of rubble from streets, the removal of unexploded ordnance and restoring of power and water supplies during the next ten days. On 14 July, Oleshev was appointed commander of 39th Army's 113th Rifle Corps. He led the corps during the Kaunas Offensive in late July and August. On 28 September, he was awarded the Order of Suvorov 2nd class. In October, the corps fought in the Battle of Memel. During the Battle of Memel, the corps, advancing in the vanguard of the 39th Army, captured Smalininkai on 9 October. The corps then fought in the Gumbinnen Operation. From January 1945, the corps fought in the East Prussian Offensive. The corps helped capture Tilsit and for its actions was awarded the honorific "Tilsit". On 21 February 1945, Oleshev was awarded the Order of Lenin. For its actions in the subsequent Battle of Königsberg, the corps was awarded the Order of the Red Banner. On 5 May, Oleshev was promoted to lieutenant general.

Along with the 39th Army, the 113th Rifle Corps was transferred east with the end of the war in Europe. From 9 August, the corps fought in the Soviet invasion of Manchuria. The corps reportedly crossed the Greater Khingan mountains quickly and advanced 950 kilometers, capturing Wangyemiao, Liaoyang, Siping and Mukden. For its actions, the corps was awarded the honorific "Mukden". During the offensive, the corps reportedly captured 2,500 Japanese soldiers. On 8 September, Oleshev was awarded the title Hero of the Soviet Union and the Order of Lenin for his leadership.

== Postwar ==
After the end of the war, Oleshev continued to serve in the Soviet Army. In 1948, he graduated from the Military Academy of the General Staff. In June 1948, he was given command of the 14th Assault Army on the Chukotka Peninsula. In December 1951, he became assistant commander of the Kiev Military District. Oleshev became commander of the 13th Army in the Carpathian Military District in January 1953. In April 1954, he became assistant commander of the Baltic Military District for combat training and head of District Combat Training. Between December 1955 and March 1959, Oleshev was the senior military advisor to the Chief of Combat Training of the Bulgarian People's Army. In April 1959, he was deputy commander of the Baltic Military District for combat training and again head of combat training in the district. On 22 February 1968, he was awarded a fourth Order of the Red Banner. Oleshev retired in December 1969. He lived in Riga and died on 2 November 1970. Oleshev was buried in Riga but reburied in May 1994 at Moscow's Troyekurovskoye Cemetery.

== Legacy ==
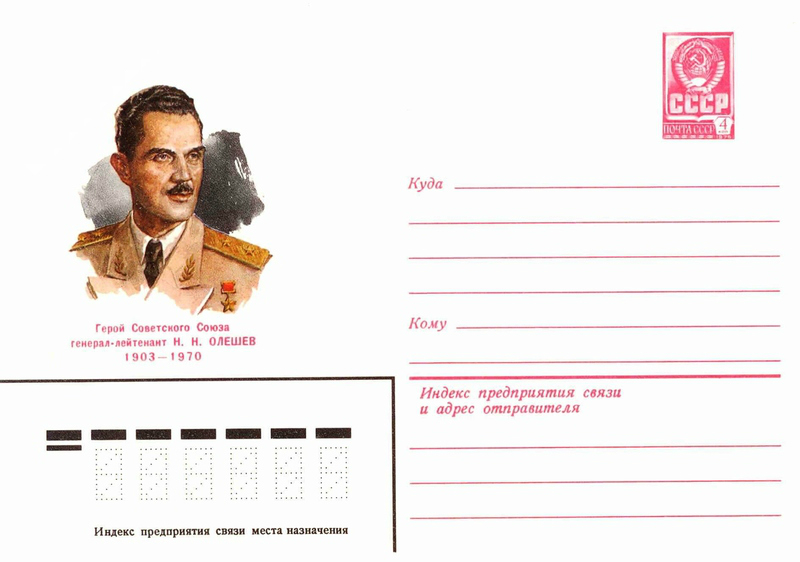
Oleshev on Soviet postal card, 1980

On 24 August 1972, a border post of the KGB Border Troops 51st Kyakhta Border Detachment was named after Oleshev. A street in Minsk is also named after him. He was also depicted on a 1980 Soviet postal card.
