= Kursky Uyezd =

Subdivision of Kursk Governorate, Russian Empire

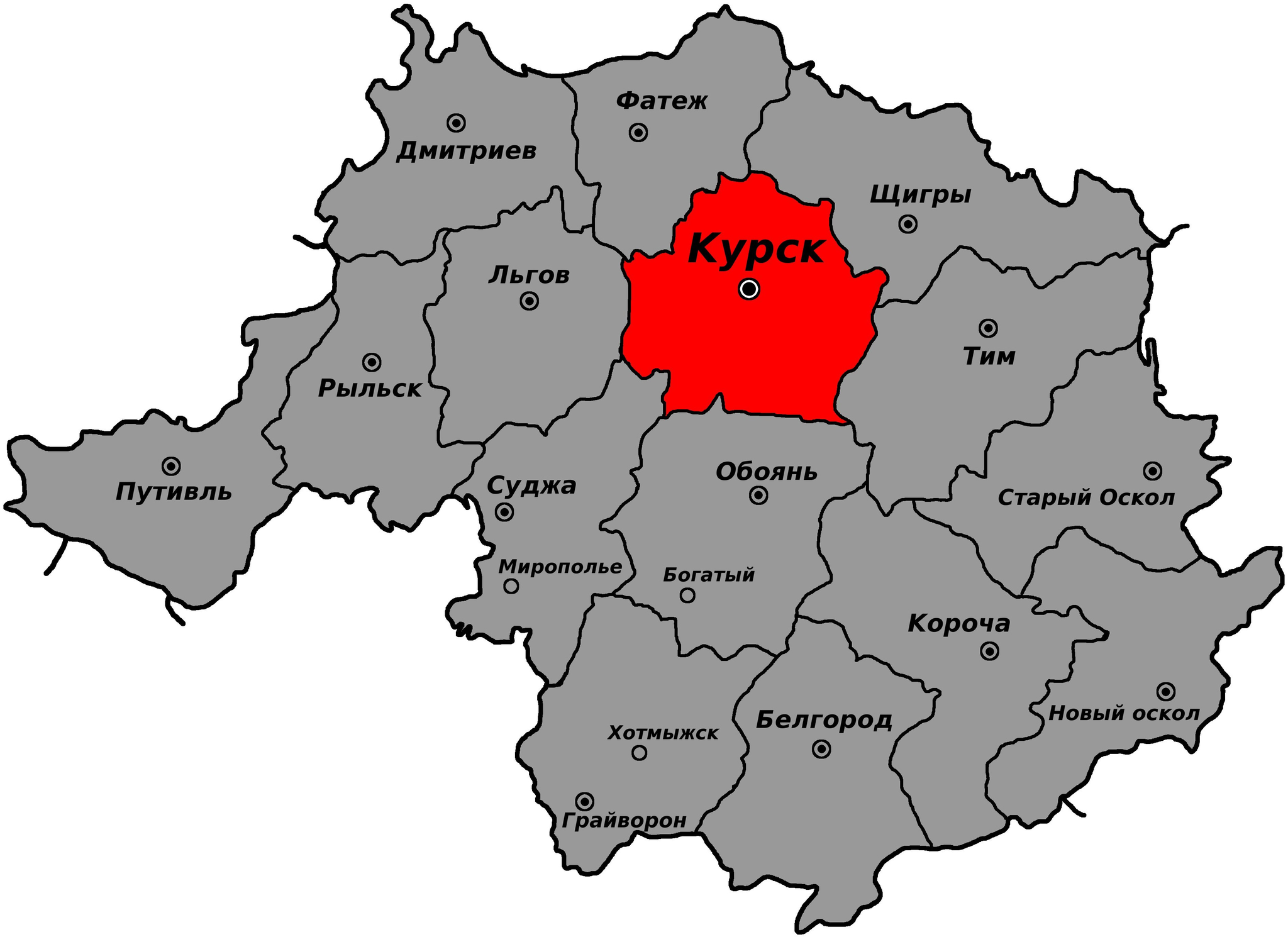
Map of Kursky Uyezd

Kursky Uyezd (Russian: Курский уезд) was one of the subdivisions of the Kursk Governorate of the Russian Empire. It was situated in the central part of the governorate. Its administrative centre was Kursk.

== Demographics ==
At the time of the Russian Empire Census of 1897, Kursky Uyezd had a population of 222,808. Of these, 97.2% spoke Russian, 1.0% Ukrainian, 0.7% Yiddish, 0.6% Polish, 0.2% German and 0.1% Tatar as their native language.
