= Voroshilovgrad Higher Military Aviation School of Navigators =

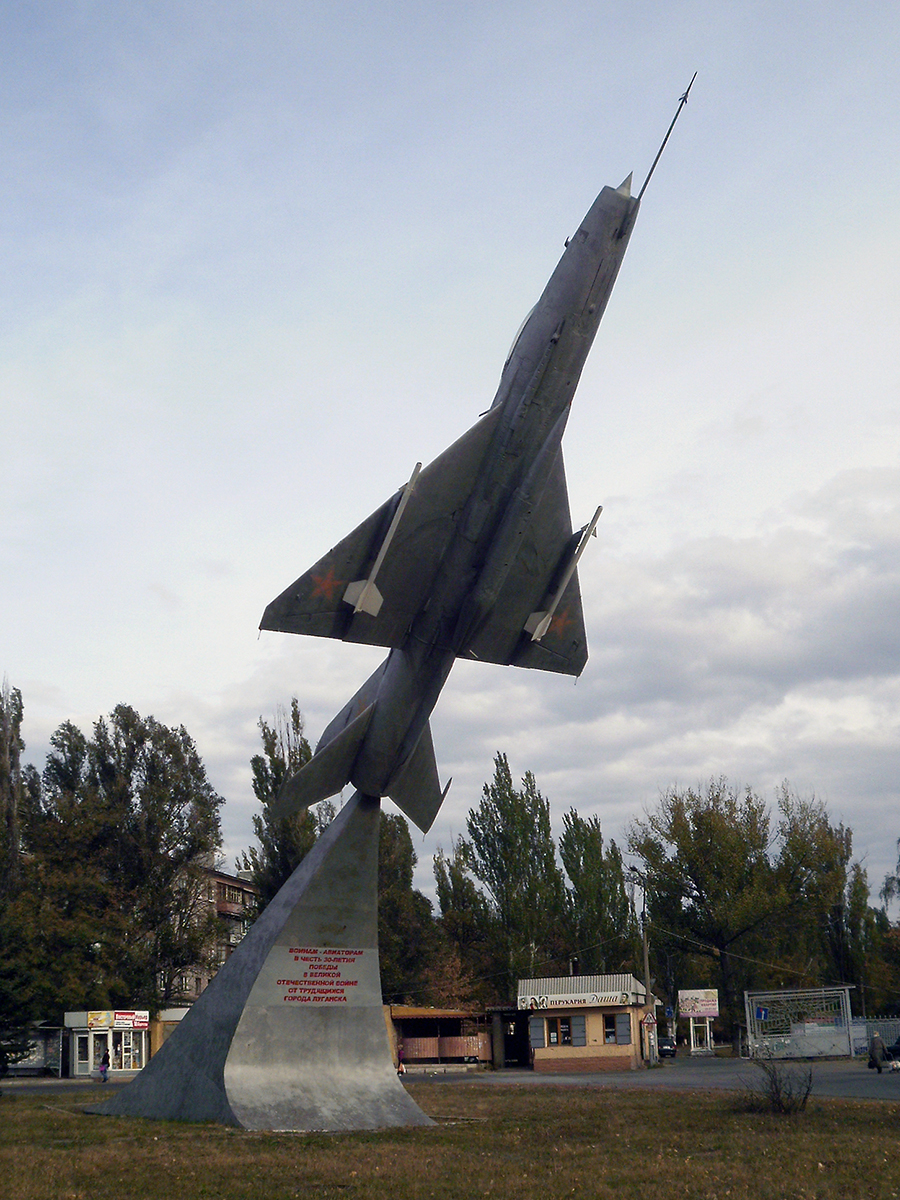
- A monument to the graduates of the school in Lugansk

Location
- Lugansk (Voroshilovgrad before 1990), Soviet Union (Ukraine from 1992)

Information
- School type: Military flying training school
- Established: 9 September 1966

The Voroshilovgrad Higher Military Aviation School of Navigators was a flying training school of the Soviet Air Forces and later the Ukrainian Air Force. Established in 1966 in Voroshilovgrad (Lugansk), the school trained navigators until its closure in 1997.

It was also known as the Lugansk Higher Military Aviation School of Navigators after city name changes during the Soviet period.

== History ==
In connection with the reduction of air and focus on intensive development of anti-missile technology, Voroshilovgrad Pilot School, amongst other Air Force military schools, was disbanded in 1960. The vacant airfield was given over to MI-4 and MI-6 helicopters. In the mid-1960s Helicopter facility was transferred to the city of Voronezh and was replaced by the Kharkov Regiment VVAUL, equipped with L-29 Delfin, who was based in Lugansk until mid-1967.

In 1966, the commander in chief of the Air Force decided to establish a second Soviet navigators' aviation school, and since at that time the only school of navigators was in Chelyabinsk, the choice fell on Lugansk city, it was decided to establish a school of navigators on the basis of previously liquidated Pilots' School. September 9, 1966, is considered the official date of formation VVVAUSH (at the time - LVVAUSH). The Chelyabinsk Red Banner Military Aviation Institute of Navigators sent to Lugansk a number of officers who formed the school's backbone. In the summer of 1967, held its first set of students in the school (two companies). In 1969, the command of the school appealed to the Regional Party Committee with a request for assignment LVVAUSH as successor Lugansk military pilot school, the name of "the proletariat of Donbass".

Since 1971, the issue is students who had been weaned four years directly VVVAUSH. Education at the school was carried out on four profiles: Military Transport Aviation, maritime missile-carrying aircraft (MPA), anti-submarine aircraft (PLA) and the profile of training - the officer of command and control.

After the independence of Ukraine, the Ministry of Defence of Ukraine was not able to maintain the school and it was gradually reduced. In October 1993 the Lugansk VVAUSH joined the Kharkiv Institute of the Air Force as a branch (now Ivan Kozhedub National Air Force University). The last issue of LVVAUSH cadets was produced in 1996 and later that year on the basis of the school was formed 205th aviation training base of the Kharkov Air Force Institute, which existed two years and was disbanded. The date of official liquidation LVVAUSH was considered July 17, 1997.
