= Mikhail Ovsyannikov =

Soviet philosopher (1915–1915)

Mikhail Fedotovich Ovsyannikov (Russian: Михаи́л Федо́тович Овся́нников; 21 November 1915 – 11 August 1987) was a Soviet philosopher and academic who concentrated on in-depth study of Georg Wilhelm Friedrich Hegel. Ovsyannikov was head of the Philosophy Department at Moscow State University from 1968 to 1974.

== Biography ==
Ovsyannikov was born 21 November 1915 in the settlement of Puzachi in the Imperial Russian Kursk Governorate (presently in Kursk Oblast). He completed a degree at V.I. Lenin Moscow State Pedagogical University in 1939, subsequently earning a Candidate of Sciences (primary-level doctoral degree) in 1943 for a dissertation titled "The Fate of Art in the Capitalist Milieu of Hegel and Balzac" («Судьба искусства в капиталистическом обществе у Гегеля и Бальзака»). In 1961 he earned the academic title Doctor of Sciences (higher-level doctoral degree) for The Philosophy of Hegel, coming to be exceptionally regarded as a specialist on the critical analysis of Hegel's works.

From 1960, Ovsyannikov directed Marxist research in aesthetics at Moscow State; he chaired the philosophy department from 1960 to 1974, teaching the history of philosophy and courses on philosophical developments outside the Soviet Union. He was the general editor of Moscow State University's philosophy journal from 1969 to 1983.

== Major works ==
- Философия Гегеля (1959)
- Гегель (1971)
- Проблемы художественного творчества (1975)
- История эстетической мысли (1983)
