= Operation Barbarossa order of battle =

German invasion of the Soviet Union during World War II

This is the order of battle for Operation Barbarossa, the German invasion of the Soviet Union during World War II. It was fought between the German-led Axis Forces and the Soviet Forces. The operation started on June 22, 1941, and ended on December 5, 1941, after Operation Typhoon.

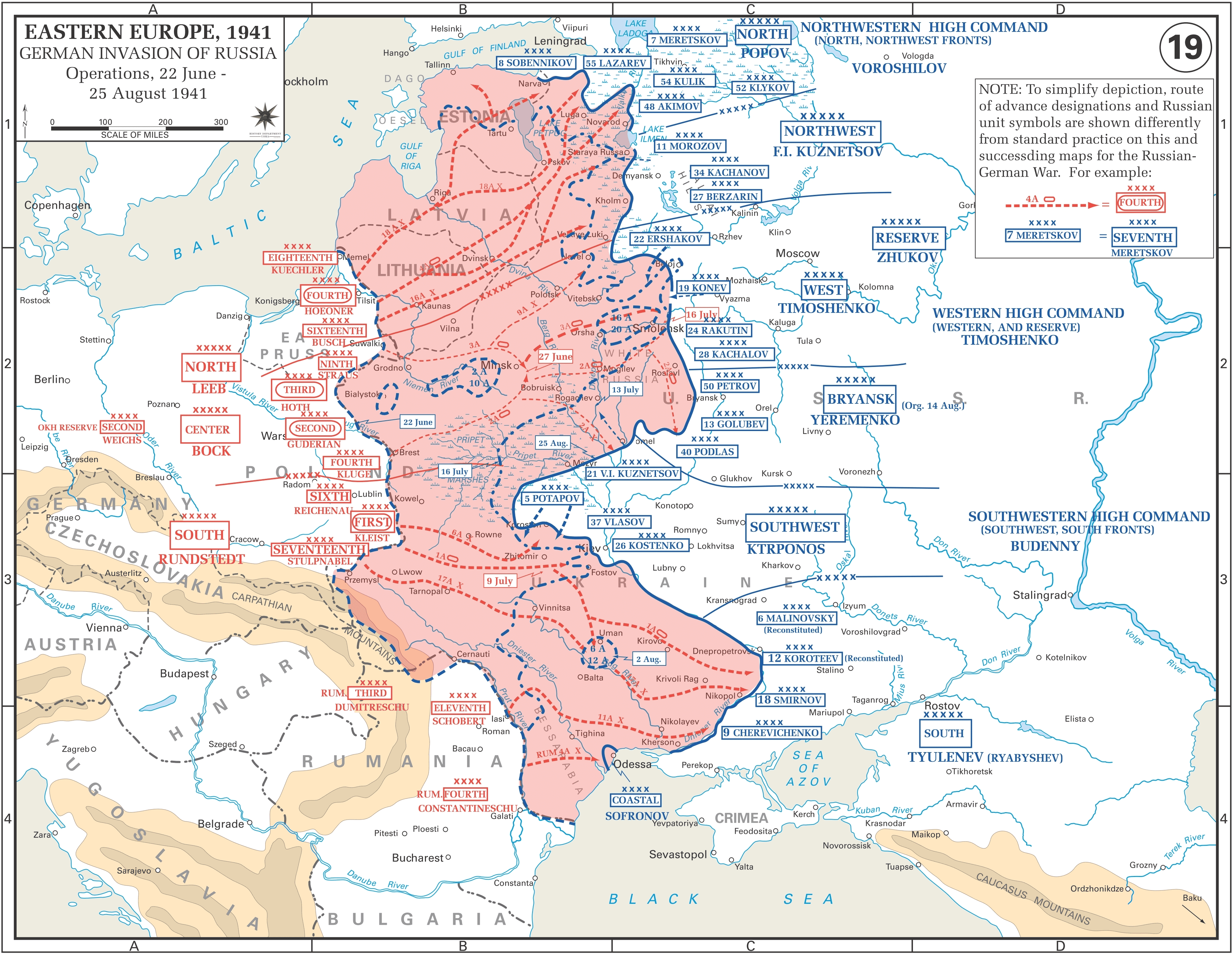
German advances during the opening phases of Operation Barbarossa from June 22, 1941, to August 25, 1941

== Axis ==
=== Army Group North ===
(Generalfeldmarschall (GFM) Wilhelm von Leeb, Chief of Staff (CoS) – Generalleutnant (GL) Kurt Brennecke)

- 16th Army (Generaloberst (GO) Ernst Busch)
  - II Corps (General der Infanterie (GdI) Walter von Brockdorff-Ahlefeldt)
    - 12th Infantry Division (ID) (GL Walther von Seydlitz-Kurzbach)
    - 32nd ID (GL Wilhelm Bohnstedt)
    - 121st ID (GL Otto Lancelle)
  - X Corps (General der Artillerie (GdA) Christian Hansen)
    - 30th ID (GL Kurt von Tippelskirch)
    - 126th ID (GL Paul Laux)
  - XXVIII Corps (GdI Mauritz von Wiktorin)
    - 122nd ID (GL Siegfried Macholz)
    - 123rd ID (GL Walter Lichel)
- 18th Army (GO Georg von Küchler, CoS – Generalmajor Kurt Waeger)
  - XXVI Corps (GdA Albert Wodrig)
    - 61st ID (GL Siegfried Haenicke)
    - 217th ID (GL Richard Baltzer)
    - 291st ID (GL Kurt Herzog)
  - XXXVIII Corps (GdI Friedrich-Wilhelm von Chappuis)
    - 58th ID (GL Karl von Graffen)
    - 254th ID (GL Walter Behschnitt)
  - I Corps (GdI Kuno-Hans von Both)
    - 1st ID (GL Philipp Kleffel)
    - 11th ID (GL Herbert von Böckmann)
    - 21st ID (GL Otto Sponheimer)

- Panzergruppe 4 (GO Erich Hoepner, CoS – Colonel Walter Chales de Beaulieu)
  - XXXXI Corps (mot.) (General der Panzertruppe GdP Georg Hans Reinhardt)
    - 1st Panzer Division (GL Friedrich Kirchner)
    - 6th Panzer Division (GL Wilhelm Ritter von Thoma)
    - 269th ID (GL Ernst von Leyser)
    - 36th ID (mot.) (GL Otto-Ernst Ottenbacher)
  - LVI Corps (mot.) (GdI Erich von Manstein)
    - 8th Panzer Division (GL Erich Brandenberger)
    - 3rd ID (mot.) (GL Curt Jahn)
    - 290th ID (GL Theodor Freiherr von Wrede)
    - SS-Totenkopf Division (SS-Obergruppenführer Theodor Eicke) (Note: Matthias Kleinheisterkamp from July 7)
- Army Group assets and reserves
  - XXIII Corps (Army Group Reserve) (GdI Albrecht Schubert)
    - 251st ID (GL Hans Kratzert)
    - 206th ID (GL Hugo Höfl)
  - L Corps (OKH Reserve behind AG North) (GL Georg Lindemann)
    - 86th ID (GL Joachim Witthöft)
    - SS Police Division (SS-Gruppenführer Arthur Mülverstedt)
  - Army Group rear lines
    - 207th SD (GL Carl von Tiedemann)
    - 281st SD (GL Friedrich Bayer)
    - 285th SD (GL Wolfgang von Plotho

=== Army Group Centre ===
(Commanded by GFM Fedor von Bock, CoS – Generalmajor (GM) Hans von Greiffenberg)

- 4th Army (GFM Günther von Kluge)
  - VII Corps (GdA Wilhelm Fahrmbacher)
    - 7th ID (GL Eccard Freiherr von Gablenz)
    - 23rd ID (GL Heinz Hellmich)
    - 258th ID (GL Waldemar Henrici)
    - 268th ID (GL Erich Straube)
  - IX Corps (GdI Hermann Geyer)
    - 137th ID (GL Friedrich Bergmann)
    - 263rd ID (GL Ernst Haeckel)
    - 292nd ID (GL Martin Dehmel)
  - XIII Corps (GdI Hans Felber)
    - 17th ID (GL Herbert Loch)
    - 78th ID (GL Curt Gallenkamp)
  - XXXXIII Corps (GdI Gotthard Heinrici)
    - 131st ID (GL Heinrich Meyer-Buerdorf)
    - 134th ID (GL Conrad von Cochenhausen)
    - 252nd ID (GL Diether von Boehm-Bezing)
- 9th Army (GO Adolf Strauß)
  - V Corps (GdI Richard Ruoff)
    - 5th ID (GL Karl Allmendinger)
    - 35th ID (GL Walther Fischer von Weikersthal)
  - VI Corps (General der Pioniere Otto-Wilhelm Förster)
    - 6th ID (GL Helge Auleb)
    - 26th ID (GL Walter Weiß)
  - VIII Corps (GdA Walter Heitz)
    - 8th ID (GL Gustav Höhne)
    - 28th ID (GL Johann Sinnhuber)
    - 161st ID (GL Hermann Wilck)
  - XX Corps (GdI Friedrich Materna)
    - 162nd ID (GL Hermann Franke)
    - 256th ID (GL Gerhard Kauffmann)

- Panzergruppe 2 (GO Heinz Guderian)
  - XII Corps (Note: Under Panzergruppe 2 only for the initial stages of the invasion.) (GdI Walther Schroth)
    - 31st ID (GL Kurt Kalmukoff)
    - 34th ID (GL Hans Behlendorff)
    - 45th ID (GL Fritz Schlieper)
  - XXIV Corps (mot.) (GdP Leo Geyr von Schweppenburg)
    - 3rd Panzer Div. (GL Walter Model)
    - 4th Panzer Div. (GL Willibald von Langermann und Erlencamp)
    - 10th ID (mot.) (GL Friedrich-Wilhelm von Loeper)
    - 1st Cavalry Div. (GL Kurt Feldt)
    - 255th ID (GL Wilhelm Wetzel)
    - 267th ID (GL Robert Martinek)
  - XXXXVI Corps (mot.) (GdI Heinrich von Vietinghoff)
    - 10th Panzer Div. (GL Ferdinand Schaal)
    - SS-Reich Div. - SS-Obergruppenführer Paul Hausser
    - IR Großdeutschland (GM Hunold von Stockhausen)
  - XXXXVII Corps (mot.) (GdP Joachim Lemelsen)
    - 17th Panzer Div. (GL Hans-Jürgen von Arnim)
    - 18th Panzer Div. (GL Walther Nehring)
    - 29th ID (mot.) (GL Walter von Boltenstern)
    - 167th ID (GL Hans Schönhärl)

- Panzergruppe 3 (GO Hermann Hoth)
  - XXXIX Corps (mot.) (GdP Rudolf Schmidt)
    - 7th Panzer Div. (GL Hans Freiherr von Funck)
    - 20th Panzer Div. (GL Horst Stumpff)
    - 14th ID (mot.) (GL Friedrich Fürst)
    - 20th ID (mot.) (GL Hans Zorn)
  - LVII Corps (mot.) (GdP Adolf-Friedrich Kuntzen)
    - 12th Panzer Div. (GL Josef Harpe)
    - 19th Panzer Div. (GL Otto von Knobelsdorff)
    - 18th ID (mot.) (GL Friedrich Herrlein)

=== Army Group South ===
(Commanded by GFM Gerd von Rundstedt, CoS – GL Georg von Sodenstern)

- German 6th Army (GFM Walther von Reichenau)
  - XVII Corps (GdI Werner Kienitz)
    - 56th ID (GL Karl von Oven)
    - 62nd ID (GL Walter Keiner)
  - XXIX Corps (GdI Hans von Obstfelder)
    - 44th ID (GL Friedrich Siebert)
    - 111th ID (GL Otto Stapf)
    - 299th ID (GL Willi Moser)
  - XXXXIV Corps (GdI Friedrich Koch)
    - 9th ID (GL Siegmund Freiherr von Schleinitz)
    - 297th ID (GL Max Pfeffer)
  - LV Corps (GdI Erwin Vierow)
    - 75th ID (GL Ernst Hammer)
    - 57th ID (GL Oskar Blümm)
    - 168th ID (GL Hans Mundt)
    - 298th ID (GM Walther Graeßner)
- Panzergruppe 1 (GO Paul Ludwig Ewald von Kleist)
  - III Corps (mot.) (General der Kavallerie (GdK) Eberhard von Mackensen)
    - 13th Panzer Div. (GL Friedrich-Wilhelm von Rothkirch und Panthen)
    - 14th Panzer Div. (GL Friedrich Kühn)
    - 25th ID (mot.) (GL Erich-Heinrich Clößner)
  - XIV Corps (mot.) (GdI Gustav Anton von Wietersheim)
    - 9th Panzer Div. (GL Alfred Ritter von Hubicki)
    - SS-Div. (mot.) Leibstandarte SS Adolf Hitler (SS-Obergruppenführer Sepp Dietrich)
    - SS-Wiking Div. (SS-Brigadeführer Felix Steiner)
  - XXXXVIII Corps (mot.) (GdP Werner Kempf)
    - 11th Panzer Div. (GL Ludwig Crüwell)
    - 16th Panzer Div. (GL Hans-Valentin Hube)
    - 16th ID (mot.) (GL Sigfrid Henrici)
- German 17th Army (GdI Carl-Heinrich von Stülpnagel)
  - IV Corps (GdI Viktor von Schwedler)
    - 24th ID (GL Hans von Tettau)
    - 71st ID (GL Alexander von Hartmann)
    - 262nd ID (GL Edgar Theisen)
    - 295th ID (GL Herbert Geitner)
    - 296th ID (GL Wilhelm Stemmermann)
  - XXXXIX Mountain Corps (GdI Ludwig Kübler)
    - 68th ID (GL Georg Braun)
    - 257th ID (GL Karl Sachs)
    - 1st Mountain Division (GL Hubert Lanz)
  - LII Corps (GdI Kurt von Briesen)
    - 101st Light ID (GL Erich Marcks)
    - 97th Light ID (GM Maximilian Fretter-Pico)
    - 100th Light ID (GM Werner Sanne)
  - Hungarian Gyorshadtest (General Béla Miklós) (Note: Hungary declared war on the USSR on 27 June 1941; the Hungarian Gyorshadtest went into action as part of Army Group South on 1 July 1941.)
    - Hungarian 1st Motorized Brigade (BG Jenő Major)
    - Hungarian 2nd Motorized Brigade (BG János Vörös)
    - Hungarian 1st Cavalry Brigade (BG Antal Vattay)
  - Slovak Expeditionary Army Group (General Ferdinand Čatloš)
    - Slovak Mobile Brigade (LTC Rudolf Pilfousek)
    - Slovak 1st ID (LG Antonin Pulanich)
    - Slovak 2nd ID (LG Alexander Čunderlík)

==== Romanian Army Group Antonescu ====
(General Ion Antonescu)

- Romanian Third Army (LG Petre Dumitrescu)
  - Romanian 4th Army Corps (MG Constantin Sănătescu)
    - 6th ID (BG Romulus Ioanovici)
    - 7th ID (BG Olimpiu Stavrat)
  - Cavalry Corps (MG Ioan Mihail Racoviță)
    - 5th Cavalry Brigade (Col. Vasile Măinescu)
    - 8th Cavalry Brigade (Col. Ioan Dănescu)
  - Mountain Corps (MG Gheorghe Avramescu)
    - 1st Mountain Brigade (BG Mihail Lascăr)
    - 2nd Mountain Brigade (BG Ioan Dumitrache)
    - 4th Mountain Brigade (BG Gheorghe Manoliu)

- German 11th Army (GO Eugen Ritter von Schobert)
  - XI Corps (GdI Joachim von Kortzfleisch)
    - 76th ID (GL Maximilian de Angelis)
    - 239th ID (GL Ferdinand Neuling)
    - Romanian 1st Armored Div. (BG Ioan Sion)
    - Romanian 6th Cavalry Brigade (MG Aurel Racovitză)
  - XXX Corps (GdI Hans von Salmuth)
    - 198th ID (GL Otto Röttig)
    - Romanian 8th ID (BG Alexandru Orășanu)
    - Romanian 13th ID (BG Gheorghe Rozin)
    - Romanian 14th ID (BG Gheorghe Stavrescu)
  - LIV Corps (GdK Erick-Oskar Hansen)
    - 50th ID (GL Karl-Adolf Hollidt)
    - 170th ID (GL Walter Wittke)
    - Romanian 5th ID (BG Petre Vlădescu)
  - Italian Expeditionary Corps (Lt. Gen.Giovanni Messe)
    - 9th ID "Pasubio" (General Vittorio Giovanelli)
    - 52nd ID "Torino" (General Luigi Manzi)
    - 3rd Cavalry Div. "Principe Amedeo Duca d'Aosta" (General Mario Marazzani)
  - 22nd ID (GL Hans Graf von Sponeck)

- Romanian Fourth Army (Lt. Gen. Nicolae Ciupercă)
  - Romanian 3rd Army Corps (MG Vasile Atanasiu)
    - Guards Division (MG Nicolae Șova)
    - 15th ID (MG Cosma Marin Popescu)
    - 35th Reserve Division (BG Emil Procopiescu)
  - Romanian 5th Army Corps (Lt. Gen. Gheorghe Leventi)
    - Border Division (BG Gheorghe Potopeanu)
    - 21st ID (MG Cristache Popescu)
  - Romanian 11th Army Corps (MG I. Aurelian)
    - two fortress brigades
- Other assets
  - Romanian 2nd Army Corps (MG Nicolae Macici)
    - 9th ID (BG Hugo Schwab)
    - 10th ID (BG Ion Glogojanu)
    - 11th ID (BG David Popescu)
    - 7th Cavalry Brigade (Col. Gheorghe Săvoiu)

== Soviet ==
=== Stavka ===
The "Main Command of the Armed Forces of the USSR" (Stavka Glavnogo Komandovaniya) was formed on 23 June, largely from the existing People's Commissariat for Defence.

Commander in Chief: Marshal Semyon Timoshenko (until July 19), then Josef Stalin
Deputy Commander-in-Chief: Army General Georgy Zhukov (from August 8)
Chief of the General Staff: Army General Georgy Zhukov (until July 21), then Marshal Boris Shaposhnikov

==== 16th Army ====
Lieutenant General Mikhail F. Lukin

32nd Rifle Corps - Major General Trofim Kolomiets

46th Rifle Division - Major General Alexander Filatov
152nd Rifle Division - Colonel Pyotr Chernyshov

5th Mechanized Corps - Major General Ilya Alekseyenko

13th Tank Division - Colonel Fyodor Grachev
17th Tank Division - Colonel Ivan Korchagin
109th Motor Rifle Division - Colonel Nikolai Krasnoretsky

==== 19th Army ====
Lieutenant General Ivan Konev

38th Rifle Division - Colonel Maxim Kirillov
25th Rifle Corps - Major General Sergey Chestohvalov

127th Rifle Division - Major General Timofey Korneyev
134th Rifle Division - Major General Vladimir Kuzmich Bazarov
162nd Rifle Division - Colonel Nikolai Kolkunov

34th Rifle Corps - Major General Raphael Khmelnitsky

129th Rifle Division - Major General Auxentios Gorodnyansky
158th Rifle Division - Colonel V.I. Novozhilov
171st Rifle Division - Major General Alexander Budyho

==== 20th Army ====
Lieutenant General Fyodor Remezov

18th Rifle Division - Colonel Karp Sviridov
61st Rifle Corps - Major General Fyodor Bakunin

110th Rifle Division - Colonel Vasily Khlebtsov
144th Rifle Division - Major General Mikhail Pronin
172nd Rifle Division - Major General Mikhail Timofeyevich Romanov

69th Rifle Corps - Major General Yevdokim Mogilovchik

73rd Rifle Division - Colonel Alexander Akimov
229th Rifle Division - Major General Mikhail Ivanovich Kozlov
233rd Rifle Division - Colonel Grigory Kotov

7th Mechanized Corps - Major General Vasily Ivanovich Vinogradov

14th Tank Division - Colonel Ivan Dmitrievich Vasilyev
1st Motor Rifle Division - Colonel Yakov Kreizer

==== 21st Army ====
Lieutenant General Vasily Gerasimenko

63rd Rifle Corps - Lieutenant General Leonid Petrovsky

53rd Rifle Division - Colonel Ivan Bartenev
148th Rifle Division - Colonel Filipp Cherokmanov
167th Rifle Division - Major General Vasily Rakovsky

66th Rifle Corps - Major General Fyodor Sudakov

61st Rifle Division - Major General Nikolay Prishchepa
117th Rifle Division - Colonel Spiridon Chernyugov
154th Rifle Division - Colonel Yakov Fokanov

25th Mechanized Corps - Major General Semyon Krivoshein

50th Tank Division - Colonel Boris Bakharov
55th Tank Division - Colonel Vasily Badanov
219th Motor Rifle Division - Major General Pavel Korzun

==== 22nd Army ====
Lieutenant General Filipp Yershakov

51st Rifle Corps

98th Rifle Division
112th Rifle Division
153rd Rifle Division

62nd Rifle Corps

170th Rifle Division
174th Rifle Division
186th Rifle Division

==== 24th Army ====
52nd Rifle Corps

91st Rifle Division
119th Rifle Division
166th Rifle Division

53rd Rifle Corps

107th Rifle Division
133rd Rifle Division (Major General Vasily Shvetsov)
178th Rifle Division

=== Northern Front ===
General Colonel Markian Popov

The front was the Leningrad Military District until 24 June.

==== 7th Army (Separate) ====
Lieutenant General Filip Danilovich Gorelenko

54th Rifle Division - Maj. Gen. I.V. Panin
71st Rifle Division - Col. V.N. Fedorov
168th Rifle Division - Col. A.L. Bondarev
237th Rifle Division - Maj. Gen. D.F. Popov
55th Mixed Aviation Division - Colonel Alexander Bogradetsky

==== 14th Army ====
Lieutenant General Valerian A. Frolov

14th Rifle Division - Col. A.A. Zhurba
52nd Rifle Division - Mj. Gen. N.N. Nikishin
1st Tank Division - Major General Viktor Ilyich Baranov
42nd Rifle Corps - Major General Roman Ivanovich Panin

104th Rifle Division - Mj. Gen. S.I. Morozov
122nd Rifle Division - Mj. Gen. P.S. Shevchenko

1st Mixed Aviation Division

==== 23rd Army ====
Lieutenant General P.S. Pshennikov

19th Rifle Corps - Major General M.N. Gerasimov

142nd Rifle Division - Mj. Gen. S.P. Mikul’skii
115th Rifle Division - Mj. Gen. V.F. Kon’kov

50th Rifle Corps - Major General V.I. S'cherbakov

43rd Rifle Division - Mj. Gen. Vladimir Kirpichnikov
70th Rifle Division - Major General Andrey Fedyunin
123rd Rifle Division - Col. Ye.Ye. Tsukanov

10th Mechanized Corps - Major General I. G. Lazarev

21st Tank Division - Col. L.V. Bunin
24th Tank Division - Col. M.I. Chesnokov
198th Motor Rifle Division - Mj. Gen. Vladimir Kryukov

5th Mixed Aviation Division
41st Bomber Aviation Division

==== Front Assets ====
177th Rifle Division - Col. A.F. Mashoshin
191st Rifle Division - Col. Dmitry Lukyanov
1st Mechanized Corps - Major General M. L. Cherniavsky

3rd Tank Division - Col. K.Yu. Andreev
163rd Motor Rifle Division - Mj. Gen. N.M. Kuznetsov

Frontal aviation

2nd Mixed Aviation Division
39th Fighter Aviation Division
3rd PVO Fighter Aviation Division
54th PVO Fighter Aviation Division

=== Northwestern Front ===
General Colonel Fyodor Isodorovich Kuznetsov Source:

Baltic Special Military District until 22 June.

==== 8th Army ====
Lieutenant General Pyotr Sobennikov

10th Rifle Corps - Major General I.F. Nikolaev

10th Rifle Division - Col. I.I. Fadeev
48th Rifle Division - Mj. Gen. P.V. Bogdanov
90th Rifle Division - Col. Mikhail Golubev

11th Rifle Corps - Major General M.S. Shumilov

11th Rifle Division - Col. N.A. Sokolov
125th Rifle Division - Mj. Gen. P.P. Bogaichuk

12th Mechanized Corps - Major General N.M. Shestopalov

23rd Tank Division - Col. T.S. Orlenko
202nd Motor Rifle Division - Col. V.K. Gorbachev

==== 11th Army ====
Lieutenant General V. I. Morosov

23rd Rifle Division - Mj. Gen. V.F. Pavlov
126th Rifle Division - Mj. Gen. M.A. Kuznetsov
128th Rifle Division - Mj. Gen. A.S. Zotov
16th Rifle Corps - Major General F.S. Ivanov

5th Rifle Division - Col. Fyodor Ozerov
33rd Rifle Division - Mj. Gen. Karp Zheleznikov
188th Rifle Division - Col. P.I. Ivanov

29th Rifle Corps - Major General A.G. Samokhin

179th Rifle Division - Col. A.I. Ustinov
184th Rifle Division - Col. M.V. Vinogradov

3rd Mechanized Corps - Major General Alexey Kurkin

2nd Tank Division - Mj. Gen. Yegor Solyankin
5th Tank Division - Col. F.F. Fedorov
84th Motorized Division - Mj. Gen. P.I. Fomenko

==== 27th Army ====
Lieutenant General Nikolai Berzarin

16th Rifle Division - Maj. Gen. I.M. Lyubovtsev
67th Rifle Division - Maj. Gen. N.A. Dedaev
3rd Rifle Brigade
22nd Rifle Corps - Major General Mikhail Dukhanov

180th Rifle Division - Col. I.I. Missan
182nd Rifle Division - Col. I.I. Kuryshev

24th Rifle Corps - Major General K. Kachalov

181st Rifle Division - Col. P.V. Borisov
183rd Rifle Division - Col. P.N. Tupikov

==== Front Assets ====
5th Airborne Corps - Major General Ivan Bezugly

9th Airborne Brigade
10th Airborne Brigade
201st Airborne Brigade

Frontal aviation

57th Fighter Aviation Division
4th Mixed Aviation Division
6th Mixed Aviation Division
7th Mixed Aviation Division
8th Mixed Aviation Division
21st PVO Fighter Aviation Division

=== Western Front ===
General Colonel Dmitry Grigorevich Pavlov

Western Special Military District until 22 June.

==== 3rd Army ====
Lieutenant General Vasily Kuznetsov

4th Rifle Corps- Major General Yevgeny Yegorov

27th Rifle Division - Mj. Gen. Aleksandr Stepanov
56th Rifle Division - Mj. Gen. Semyon Sakhnov
85th Rifle Division - Mj. Gen. Aleksandr Bondovsky

11th Mechanized Corps - Major General Dmitry Mostevenko

29th Tank Division - Col. N.P. Studnev
33rd Tank Division - Col. Mikhail Panov
204th Motor Rifle Division - Col. A.M. Pirogov

==== 4th Army ====
Lieutenant General Aleksandr Korobkov

49th Rifle Division - Col. C.F. Vasil’ev
75th Rifle Division - Col. Nedwigin
28th Rifle Corps - Major General Vasily Popov

6th Rifle Division - Col. M.A. Popsiu-Shapko
42nd Rifle Division - Major General Ivan Lazarenko

14th Mechanized Corps - Major General Stepan Oborin

22nd Tank Division - Mj. Gen. V.P. Puganov
30th Tank Division - Col. Semyon Bogdanov
205th Motor Rifle Division - Col. F.F. Kudjurov

==== 10th Army ====
Lieutenant General Konstantin Golubev

1st Rifle Corps - Major General F.D. Rubtzov

2nd Rifle Division - Col. M.D. Grishin
8th Rifle Division - Col. N.I. Fomin

5th Rifle Corps - Major General A.V. Garnov

13th Rifle Division - Col. A.Z. Naumov
86th Rifle Division - Col. M.A. Zashibalov
113th Rifle Division - Mj. Gen. Kh.N. Alaverdov

6th Cavalry Corps - Major General I.S. Nikitin

6th Cavalry Division - Mj. Gen. Mikhail Konstantinov
36th Cavalry Division - Mj. Gen. E.S. Zybin

6th Mechanized Corps - Major General Mikhail Khatskilevich

4th Tank Division - Mj. Gen. A.G. Potaturchev
7th Tank Division - Mj. Gen. S.V. Borzilov
29th Motor Rifle Division - Mj. Gen. I.P. Bikdjanov

13th Mechanized Corps - Major General Pyotr Akhlyustin

25th Tank Division - Col. N.M. Nikiforov
31st Tank Division - Col. S.A. Kalikhovich
208th Motor Rifle Division - Col. Vladimir Nichiporovich

==== Front Assets ====
2nd Rifle Corps - Major General Arkady Yermakov

100th Rifle Division - Major General Ivan Russiyanov
161st Rifle Division - Colonel Alexey Mikhaylov

21st Rifle Corps - Major General Vladimir Borisov

17th Rifle Division - Major General Terenty Batsanov
24th Rifle Division - Major General Kuzma Galitsky
37th Rifle Division - Colonel Andrey Chekharin

44th Rifle Corps - Major General Vasily Yushkevich

64th Rifle Division - Colonel Sergey Iovlev
108th Rifle Division - Major General Alexander Mavrichev

47th Rifle Corps - Major General Stepan Povetkin

50th Rifle Division - Major General Vasily Yevdokimov
55th Rifle Division - Colonel Dmitry Ivanyuk
121st Rifle Division - Major General Pyotr Zykov
143rd Rifle Division - Major General Dmitry Safonov

4th Airborne Corps - Major General Alexey Zhadov

7th Airborne Brigade - Colonel Mikhail Tikhonov
8th Airborne Brigade - Lieutenant Colonel Alexander Onufriyev
214th Airborne Brigade - Colonel Alexey Levashov

17th Mechanized Corps - Major General Mikhail Petrov

27th Tank Division - Colonel Alexey Akhmanov
36th Tank Division - Colonel Sergey Miroshnikov
209th Motorized Division - Colonel Alexey Muravyov

20th Mechanized Corps - Major General Andrey Nikitin

26th Tank Division - Major General Viktor Obukhov
38th Tank Division - Colonel Sergey Kapustin
210th Motorized Division - Major General Feofan Parkhomenko

Frontal aviation

43rd Fighter Aviation Division
12th Bomber Aviation Division
13th Bomber Aviation Division
9th Mixed Aviation Division
10th Mixed Aviation Division
11th Mixed Aviation Division
184th PVO Fighter Aviation Division
Additionally 59th and 60th Fighter Aviation Divisions were forming.

=== Southwestern Front ===
General Colonel Mikhail Kirponos

Kiev Special Military District until 22 June.

==== 5th Army ====
Lieutenant General M.I. Potapov

15th Rifle Corps - Major General Ivan Fedyuninsky

45th Rifle Division - Mj. Gen. G.I. Sherstyuk
62nd Rifle Division - Col. M.P. Timoshenko

27th Rifle Corps - Major General P.D. Artememko

87th Rifle Division - Mj. Gen. Filipp Alyabushev
124th Rifle Division - Mj. Gen. F.G. Sushii
135th Rifle Division - Mj. Gen. F.N. Smekhotvorov

22nd Mechanized Corps - Major General S.M. Kondrusev

19th Tank Division - Mj. Gen. K.A. Semenchenko
41st Tank Division - Col. P.P. Pavlov
215th Motor Rifle Division - Col. P.A. Barabanov

Transferred to 5th Army from Front command on evening of June 22nd
9th Mechanized Corps - Major General Konstantin Rokossovsky

20th Tank Division - Col. Mikhail Katukov
35th Tank Division - Mj. Gen. N.A. Novikov
131st Motorized Division - Col. N.V. Kalinin

19th Mechanized Corps - Major General Nikolay Feklenko

40th Tank Division - Col. M.V. Shirobokov
43rd Tank Division - Col. I.G. Tsibin

==== 6th Army ====
Lieutenant General Ivan Muzychenko

6th Rifle Corps - Major General I.I. Alekseev

41st Rifle Division - Mj. Gen. G.N. Mikushev
97th Rifle Division - Col. N.M. Zakharov
159th Rifle Division - Col. Ivan Mashchenko

37th Rifle Corps - Major General S.P. Zibin

80th Rifle Division - Mj. Gen. V.I. Prokhorov
139th Rifle Division - Col. N.L. Loginov
141st Rifle Division - Mj. Gen. Ya.I. Tonkonogov

5th Cavalry Corps - Major General F.V. Kamkov

3rd Cavalry Division - Major General Mikhail Maleyev
14th Cavalry Division - Vasily Kryuchenkin

4th Mechanized Corps - Major General Andrey Vlasov

8th Tank Division - Col. P.S. Fotchenkov
32nd Tank Division - Col. Yefim Pushkin
81st Motor Rifle Division - Col. P.M. Varipaev

Transferred to 6th Army from 26th Army on evening of June 22nd
8th Mechanized Corps - Major General Dmitry Ryabyshev

12th Tank Division - Mj. Gen. T.A. Mishanin
34th Tank Division - Col. I.V. Vasil'ev
7th Motor Rifle Division - Col. A.G. Gerasimov

Transferred to 6th Army from Front command on evening of June 22nd
15th Mechanized Corps - Major General I.I. Karpezo

10th Tank Division - Mj. Gen S.Ya. Ogurtsov
37th Tank Division - Col. F.G. Anikushkin
212th Motor Rifle Division - Mj. Gen. S.V. Baranov

==== 12th Army ====
Lieutenant General Pavel Ponedelin

13th Rifle Corps - Major General Nikolai Kirillov

44th Mountain Division - Mj. Gen. S.A. Tkachenko
58th Mountain Division - Mj. Gen. N.I. Proshkin
192nd Mountain Division - Col. S.D. Gubin

17th Rifle Corps - Major General Ivan Galanin

60th Mountain Rifle Division - Mj. Gen. M.B. Salikhov
96th Mountain Rifle Division - Mj. Gen. Ivan Shepetov
164th Rifle Division - Col. A.N. Chervinskii

16th Mechanized Corps - Major General A.D. Sokolov

15th Tank Division - Col. V.I. Polozkov
39th Tank Division - Col. N.V. Starkov
240th Motor Rifle Division - Col. I.V. Gorbenko

==== 26th Army ====
Lieutenant General F. Ya. Kostenko

8th Rifle Corps - Major General M.G. Snegov

72nd Mountain Division - Mj. Gen. P.I. Abramidze
99th Rifle Division - Col. N.I.Dement'ev
173rd Rifle Division - Mj. Gen. S.V.Verzin

==== Front Assets ====
31st Rifle Corps - Major General Anton Lopatin

193rd Rifle Division - Col. A.K. Berestov
195th Rifle Division - Mj. Gen. V.N. Nesmelov
200th Rifle Division - Col. Ivan Lyudnikov

36th Rifle Corps - Major General P.V. Sisoev

140th Rifle Division - Col. Luka Basanets
146th Rifle Division - Mj. Gen. I.M. Gerasimov
228th Rifle Division - Col. A.M. Il’in

49th Rifle Corps - Major General Ivan Alekseyevich Kornilov

190th Rifle Division - Col. G.A. Zverev
197th Rifle Division - Col. S.D. Gubin
199th Rifle Division - Col. A.N. Alekseev

55th Rifle Corps - Major General Konstantin Koroteev

130th Rifle Division - Mj. Gen. V.A. Vizzhili
169th Rifle Division - Mj. Gen. I.E. Turunov
189th Rifle Division - Combrig A.S. Chichkanov

1st Airborne Corps - Major General Matvei Usenko

1st Airborne Brigade
204th Airborne Brigade
211th Airborne Brigade
213th Motor Rifle Division - Col. V.M.Osminskiy

24th Mechanized Corps - Major General Vladimir Chistyakov

45th Tank Division - Col. Mikhail Solomatin
49th Tank Division - Col. K.F. Shvetsov
216th Motor Rifle Division - Col. A. Sarkisyan

Frontal aviation

44th Fighter Aviation Division
64th Fighter Aviation Division
19th Bomber Aviation Division
62nd Bomber Aviation Division
14th Mixed Aviation Division
15th Mixed Aviation Division
16th Mixed Aviation Division
17th Mixed Aviation Division
63rd Mixed Aviation Division
36th PVO Fighter Aviation Division

=== Southern Front ===
General Colonel Ivan Tyulenev

==== 9th Army (Separate) ====
Lieutenant General Yakov Cherevichenko

14th Rifle Corps - Major General Daniil Yegorov

25th Rifle Division - Col. A.S. Zakharchenko
51st Rifle Division - Mj. Gen. P.G. Tsirul’nikov

35th Rifle Corps - Major General I.F. Dashichev

95th Rifle Division - Mj. Gen. A.I. Pastrevich
176th Rifle Division - Mj. Gen. V.M.Martsinkevich

48th Rifle Corps - Major General Rodion Malinovsky

30th Mountain Rifle Division - Mj. Gen. S.G. Galaktionov
74th Rifle Division - Col. F.Ye. Sheverdin
150th Rifle Division - Mj. Gen. I.I. Khorun

2nd Cavalry Corps - Major General Pavel Alexeyevich Belov

5th Cavalry Division - Colonel Viktor Kirillovich Baranov
9th Cavalry Division - Col. A.F. Bychkovsky

2nd Mechanized Corps - Major General Yury Novoselsky

11th Tank Division - Col. G.I. Kuzmin
16th Tank Division - Col. M.I. Mindro
15th Motorized Division - Col. Nikolay Belov

18th Mechanized Corps - Major General P.V. Volokh

44th Tank Division - Col. V.P. Krimov
47th Tank Division - Col. Georgy Rodin
218th Motor Rifle Division - Mj. Gen. F.N. Shilov

20th Mixed Aviation Division
21st Mixed Aviation Division
45th Mixed Aviation Division
65th Fighter Aviation Division (forming)
66th Fighter Aviation Division (forming)

==== Front Assets ====
7th Rifle Corps - Major General K.L. Dobroserdov

116th Rifle Division - Col. Ya.F. Eremenko
196th Rifle Division - Maj. Gen. Konstantin Kulikov
206th Rifle Division - Col. Sergey Gorshkov

9th Rifle Corps - Major General Pavel Batov

106th Rifle Division - Combrig M.S. Tkachev
156th Rifle Division - Mj. Gen. P.V. Chernyaev
32nd Cavalry Division - Col. A.I. Batskalevich

3rd Airborne Corps - Major General Vasili Glazunov

5th Airborne Brigade - Colonel Alexander Rodimtsev
6th Airborne Brigade - Colonel Viktor Zholudev
212th Airborne Brigade - Colonel Ivan Zatevakhin

47th Rifle Division

== Air Forces ==
=== Axis ===
==== Luftwaffe ====
The directive issued to the Luftwaffe for Barbarossa ordered that Luftflotte 2, under the command of Albert Kesselring was to be the strongest Air Fleet. Kesselring was assigned to supporting Army Group Centre, which was to capture Minsk, Smolensk and Moscow. Kesselring was given Fliegerkorps VIII (a specialised ground attack Corps, commanded by tactical specialist Wolfram Freiherr von Richthofen), Fliegerkorps II (commanded by Bruno Loerzer) and the 1st Anti-Aircraft Corps (1st AA Corps under Walther von Axthelm). Army Group South was supported by Luftflotte 4, containing Fliegerkorps V (under Robert Ritter von Greim) and Fliegerkorps IV (under Kurt Pflugbeil). The Air Fleet and Army Group were responsible for capturing Kiev, the Crimea and the Caucasus oilfields. Army Group North was supported by Luftflotte 1, and Luftflotte 5. Luftflotte 5 conducted operations in the Arctic near Murmansk. Luftflotte 1 supported operations in the Baltic Sea, Baltic States and near, in and over Leningrad. Luftflotte 1 contained Fliegerkorps I under the command of Helmuth Förster.

==== Other Axis air forces ====
The Royal Romanian Air Force was considered weak by the OKL, and therefore unlikely to play a great role in the ground fighting. Far more attention was given by the OKW to training and preparing the Romanian Army. Hitler, on 18 June 1941, declared that the primary mission of the Romanian air arm was to defend Romania and the Romanian oilfields. Only when those forces were sufficient, could they divert the remaining forces to ground support operations for Barbarossa. On 21 June 1941, it possessed a balanced fleet of 53 Squadrons; 11 bomber (five modern), 17 fighter (nine modern), 15 reconnaissance, six liaison, two flying boat, one transport and one air ambulance unit. On the 22 June, there was 160 fighters and 82 bombers in service. Total strength amounted to 380 aircraft. Only 30 of the Romanian fighters were Bf 109s, of the E model. However, this small force did not remain inferior in numbers for along. Despite a weak inter-war economy, the aircraft industry was run very efficiently, and they were able to produce some very capable aircraft; such as the IAR 37, IAR 39 and IAR 80. Unlike the army that stagnated, it was able to garner the cream of the Romanian officer corps. With the right support, organisation and modern equipment, it was able to grow in number and match its enemies in quality. In air defence and ground support operations it performed well, but failed in strategic bomber and naval operations owing to a lack of doctrine. Within a few weeks of Barbarossa beginning, it was able to put up 1,061 aircraft, including 400 trainers. The modern combat aircraft were focused into one unified Air Combat Group, or GAL (Gruparea Aerienă de Luptă), while the obsolete types were given the Romanian Fourth Army, operating under the German Army Group South.

=== Soviet ===
==== Organisation ====
Since 1935, Soviet military aviation had been divided between the army (VVS KA) and the navy (VVS VMF). The VVS KA had been split into four different organisations owing to faulty conclusions drawn from the Winter War. Owing to a lack of coordination in close support operations with the Red Army, the entire VVS KA was subordinated to the field armies. The existence of too many different branches under separate commands in Soviet air power caused coordination problems (made worse by Axis bombing during Barbarossa). Most Soviet bomber units could not coordinate with fighter aviation, consequently they did not have fighter escort for long periods.

The total strength of the VVS amounted to 61 divisions; 18 fighter, nine bomber and 34 mixed. Five brigades were also included. The Front Air Forces were divided into Districts (later 'Fronts') and the home defence, the PVO. This element had 40.5 per cent of the Soviet air strength. The Army Air Forces comprised 43.7 per cent of the VVS' strength. The liaison squadrons were a collection of individual squadrons assigned to different army corps of the ground army (KAE). They comprised only 2.3 per cent.

The Soviet order of battle:

==== Leningrad and Baltic Fronts ====
- VVS Leningrad Military District, later the VVS Northern Front
  - 1st Composite Air Division (1st SAD), subordinate to the 14th Army
    - 10 BAP (Bomber Aviation Regiment)
    - 137 BAP
    - 145th Fighter Aviation Regiment (145 IAP)
    - 147 IAP
  - 55th Composite Aviation Division (55 SAD) (subordinated to the 7th Army)
    - 72 SBAP (High Speed Bomber Aviation Regiment)
    - 153rd Fighter Aviation Regiment
  - 5 SAD (subordinated to the 23rd Army)
    - 7 IAP
    - 159 IAP
    - 158 IAP
  - 41 SAD (subordinate to the 23rd Army)
    - 201 SBAP
    - 202 SBAP
    - 205 SBAP
  - 3rd Fighter Aviation Division (IAD)
    - 191 Fighter Aviation Regiment (IAP)
    - 44 IAP
  - 54 IAD
    - 26 IAP
    - 157 IAP
    - 311 RAP
  - 2 SAD
    - 2 SBAP
    - SBAP 44
    - 58 SBAP
    - 65 ShAD (Ground Attack Aviation Division)
  - 39 IAD
    - 154 IAP
    - 155 IAP
    - 156 IAP

The total strength of the front was 1,270 aircraft.

- VVS Baltic Special Military District, later the VVS North-Western Front
  - 8 SAD
    - 15 IAP
    - 31 IAP
    - 61 ShAP.
  - 57 IAD
    - 42 IAP
    - 49 IAP
    - 54 SBAP
  - 7 SAD
    - 10 IAP
    - 9 SBAP
    - 46 BAP
    - 241 SBAP
  - 6 SAD
    - 21 IAP
    - 31 SBAP
    - 40 BAP
    - 148 IAP
  - 4 SAD
    - 38 IAP
    - 35 SBAP
    - 50 SBAP
    - 53 SBAP

The total strength of the front was 1,211 aircraft.

==== Western and South Western Fronts ====
- VVS Western Military District, later the VVS Western Front
  - 313 RAP
  - 314 RAP
  - 9 Mixed Air Division (SAD) (attached to 10th Army near Bialystock)
    - 13 SBAP
    - 41 Fighter Aviation Regiment (IAP)
    - 124 IAP
    - 126 IAP
    - 129 IAP
  - 10 SAD (attached to 4th Army near Brest-Litovsk)
    - 33 IAP
    - 74 ShAP
    - 123 IAP
    - 39 SBAP
  - 11 SAD (attached to 3rd Army near Grodno-Lida)
    - 16 SBAP
    - 122 IAP
    - 127 IAP
  - 12 BAD (Vitebsk)
    - 6 SBAP
    - 43 SBAP
    - 128 SBAP
    - 209 SBAP
    - 215 SBAP
  - 43 IAD (Minsk and Smolensk)
    - 160 IAP
    - 161 IAP
    - 162 IAP
    - 163 IAP
  - 13 BAD (Bobruysk)
    - 24 SBAP
    - 97 SBAP
    - 121 SBAP
    - 125 SBAP
    - 130 SBAP

The total strength of the front was 1,789 aircraft.

- VVS Kiev Special Military District, later the VVS South-Western Front
  - 315 RAP and 316 RAP
  - 14 SAD (5th Army, Lutsk area)
    - 17 IAP
    - 46 IAP
    - 89 IAP
  - 62 BAD (Kiev)
    - 52 SBAP
    - 94 SBAP
    - 243 SBAP
    - 245 SBAP
  - 15 SAD (attached to the 6th Army), Lvov)
    - 23 IAP
    - 28 IAP
    - 66 ShAP
    - 164 IAP
  - 16 SAD (attached to 6th Army), Ternopol)
    - 86 SBAP
    - 87 IAP
    - 92 IAP
    - 226 SBAP
    - 227 SBAP
  - 63 SAD (attached to 26th Army), Stryy)
    - 20 IAP
    - 62 IAP
    - 91 IAP
    - 165 IAP
  - 64 SAD (12th Army), Stanislav
    - 12 IAP
    - 149 IAP
    - 166 IAP
    - 246 IAP
    - 247 IAP
  - 17 BAD (Proskurov)
    - 48 SBAP
    - 224 SBAP
    - 225 SBAP
    - 242SBAP
    - 244 SBAP
  - 36 IAD (Kiev)
    - 2 IAP
    - 43 IAP
    - 254 IAP
    - 255 IAP
  - 19 BAD (Bila Tserkva)
    - 33 SBAP
    - 136 BAP
    - 38 SBAP
  - 44 IAD (Vinnitsa)
    - 88 IAP
    - 248 IAP
    - 249 IAP
    - 252 IAP

The total strength of the front was 1,913 aircraft.

==== Odessa Front and Long Range Aviation ====
- VVS Odessa Military District, later the VVS Southern Front
  - 146 RAP
  - 317 RAP
  - 20 SAD (Beltsy and Tiropol)
    - 4 IAP
    - 45 SBAP
    - 55 IAP
    - 211 SBAP
  - 21 SAD (Bolgrad-Vorms)
    - 5 BAP
    - 69 IAP
    - 67 IAP
    - 168 IAP
    - 299 ShAP

The total strength of the front was 950 aircraft.

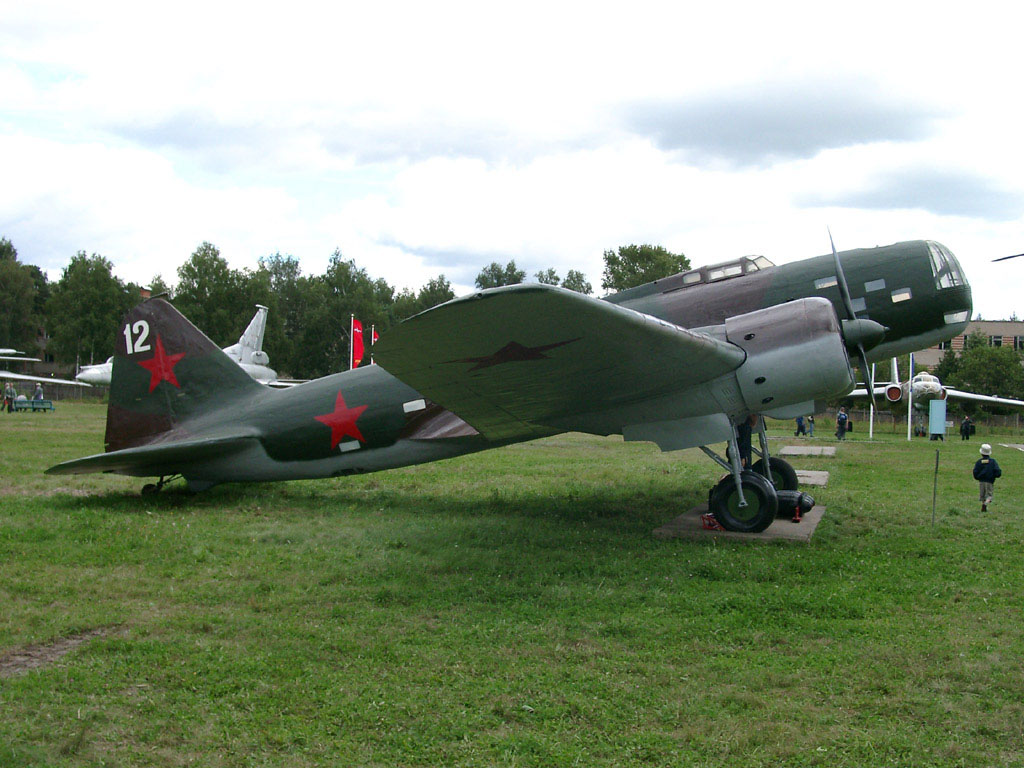
Ilyushin DB-3 bomber.

- DBA (Long-range Strategic Bomber Aviation)
  - 1 BAK (Bomber Aviation Group) (Novgorod)
    - 40 DBAD
    - 53 DBAD
    - 200 DBAD
    - 7 TDBAP
  - 2 BAK (Kursk)
    - 35 DBAD
    - 100 DBAD
    - 219 DBAD
    - 223 DBAD
    - 48 DBAD
    - 51 DBAD
    - 220 DBAD
    - 221 DBAD
    - 222 DBAD
  - 3 BAK (Smolensk)
    - 52 DBAD
    - 3 TBDAP
    - 98 DBAD
    - 212 DBAD
    - 42 DBAD
    - 1 TBDAP
    - 96 DBAD
    - 207 DBAD
  - 4 BAK (Zaporozhye)
    - 22 DBAD
    - 8 DBAD
    - 11 DBAD
    - 21 DBAD
    - 50 DBAD
    - 81 DBA
    - 299 DBAP
    - 231 DBAP
    - 228 DBAP
  - 18 DBAD (Independent Division) (Skomorokhy and Boryspil)
    - 14 TDBAP
    - 90 DBAP
    - 93 DBAP

The total strength of the front was 1,332 aircraft; 1,122 DB-3s, 20 TB-3s, and nine TB-7s.

== Bibliography ==
- Bergström, Christer. Barbarossa - The Air Battle: July–December 1941, London: Chevron/Ian Allan, 2007. ISBN 978-1-85780-270-2.
- Plocher, Hermann. The German Air Force versus Russia, 1941. United States Air Force Studies, Washington, 1968. ISBN 978-0-405-00044-7
- Plocher, Hermann. The German Air Force versus Russia, 1942. United States Air Force Studies, Washington, 1968. ISBN 978-0-405-00045-4
- Statiev, Alexander. Antonescu's Eagles against Stalin's Falcons: The Romanian Air Force, 1920-1941, in 'The Journal of Military History', Volume 66, No. 4 (Oct. 2002), pp. 1085–1113
- Glantz, David M. (2002). The Battle for Leningrad 1941-1944. Kansas University Press. ISBN 0-7006-1208-4.
