= Andrey Nikitin =

Andrey Nikitin may refer to:

- Andrey Nikitin (footballer, born 1980), Russian association football player
- Andrey Nikitin (footballer, born 2000), Russian association football player
- Andrey Nikitin (general) (1891–1957), Soviet officer
- Andrey Nikitin (politician) (born 1979), acting Governor of Novgorod Oblast, Russia
