= Mikhail Timofeyevich Romanov =

Red Army major general

- Born: 3 November 1891; Nizhny Novgorod, Russian Empire
- Died: 3 December 1941 (aged 50) Hammelburg, Nazi Germany
- Allegiance: Russian Empire; Russian SFSR; Soviet Union
- Branch: Russian Imperial Army; Red Army
- Service years: 1915–1918; 1918–1941
- Rank: Major general
- Commands: 185th Rifle Division; 172nd Rifle Division
- Conflicts: World War I; Russian Civil War; World War II; Operation Barbarossa; Siege of Mogilev (POW) (DOW)
- Awards: Order of the Red Banner

Mikhail Timofeyevich Romanov (Russian: Михаил Тимофеевич Романов; 3 November 1891 – 13 December 1941) was a Red Army major general. Romanov served with the Imperial Russian Army in World War I and joined the Red Army; he held command positions during the Russian Civil War. In 1939, Romanov became commander of the 185th Rifle Division. He attended courses at the Military Academy of the General Staff and became commander of the 172nd Rifle Division. Romanov led the division in the Siege of Mogilev and was taken prisoner during the Soviet breakout attempt. He was sent to the Hammelburg POW camp and died there in December 1941.

== Early life, World War I, and Russian Civil War ==
Romanov was born on 3 November 1891 in Nizhny Novgorod, the son of a craftsman. His father died when Romanov was fifteen, after the latter graduated from the city school. To support his mother and sister, he worked as a craftsman. In September 1915 he was mobilized as part of a militia call-up into the Imperial Russian Army, becoming a ratnik 2-go razryada (2nd class warrior) in the 153rd Separate Reserve Battalion, stationed in Kungur. Transferred to the 139th Reserve Battalion at Shadrinsk in February 1916, Romanov graduated from a warrant officers' preparatory course there prior to instruction at the Chistopol Warrant Officer School beginning in late March. After graduating from the school in August, Romanov was assigned to the 243rd Reserve Regiment in Nikolayevskoy sloboda as a junior unter-ofitser. He was again transferred to the 50th Reserve Regiment in Rzhev during January 1917, where he served successively as a platoon commander, assistant company commander, and company commander. Romanov lived with his wife Marya Yefimovna in Rzhev, while the latter worked as a telegraphist. In the aftermath of the February Revolution Romanov became a member of the regimental committee.

Romanov was sent to the frontline army in November 1917 as a replacement to the 4th Rifle Regiment of the 1st Caucasus Rifle Division, being elected assistant battalion commander upon his arrival, after the October Revolution. With the same regiment, he subsequently served as chief of staff of a consolidated detachment responsible for the defense of Jakobstadt. As the army disintegrated, Romanov went on leave in January 1918 and was demobilized as a podporuchik a month later.

Returning to Rzhev, Romanov joined the Red Army there on 5 June and became a company commander in the 4th Karachev Rifle Regiment of the 2nd Tver Rifle Division. The regiment was relocated to Zubtsov in October, where it was reorganized as a special purpose battalion in the 1st Rifle Division; Romanov became head of the battalion school. The battalion was sent to the Eastern Front in May 1919, fighting against the White Army at Samara, Orenburg, and Akhtubinsk. Injured in a train derailment at the Aim rail siding on 30 October, he became head of the regimental school of the 2nd Tatar Rifle Regiment of the 1st Separate Volga Tatar Rifle Brigade in the 1st Army at Atkarsk following the disbandment of the battalion school. With the regiment, Romanov was sent to fight against the Basmachi in Fergana Oblast during November, serving in actions at Aralsk, Tashkent, and Andijan, where he was wounded in the head in May 1920. Andrey Yeryomenko wrote that Romanov had met Mikhail Frunze while in the hospital. For his leadership of the regimental school in the campaign Romanov was made assistant regimental commander, and upon his recovery from 7 June commanded the regiment, which later became the 11th Turkestan Rifle Regiment of the 4th Turkestan Rifle Division.

== Interwar period ==
Romanov's regiment was transferred to Verniy after the suppression of the Basmachi revolt. In October 1923, he left Central Asia for the Higher Rifle-Tactics Courses for the Improvement of the Red Army Infantry Command Cadre. After graduating in August 1924, he became commander of the 50th Rifle Regiment of the 17th Rifle Division in Nizhny Novgorod. Romanov served on the division staff from January 1925, initially as head of drill but then as chief of the operations department from October and chief of supply from August 1927, simultaneously serving in the latter position for the Gorokhovets military camps. While in Nizhny Novgorod, Marya Yefimovna gave birth to two sons, Vsevold (born 1922) and Yury (born 1923), and a daughter, Rimna, in 1927. He transferred to command the 18th Rifle Regiment of the 6th Rifle Division at Livny in May 1931.

He served as acting commander of the 55th Rifle Division at Kursk from June 1938, becoming its assistant commander in December. Romanov took command of the 185th Rifle Division, one of the new divisions formed during the expansion of the Red Army, at Belgorod in August 1939. He accompanied the division when it moved to Minsk in the Belorussian Special Military District during May 1940 and to Lithuania in August as part of the 11th Rifle Corps of the 8th Army in the Baltic Special Military District. During the year, Romanov was promoted to Major General and became a Communist Party of the Soviet Union member. After graduating from a six-month commander improvement course at the Military Academy of the General Staff beginning in December, he became commander of the 172nd Rifle Division in March 1941.

== World War II ==
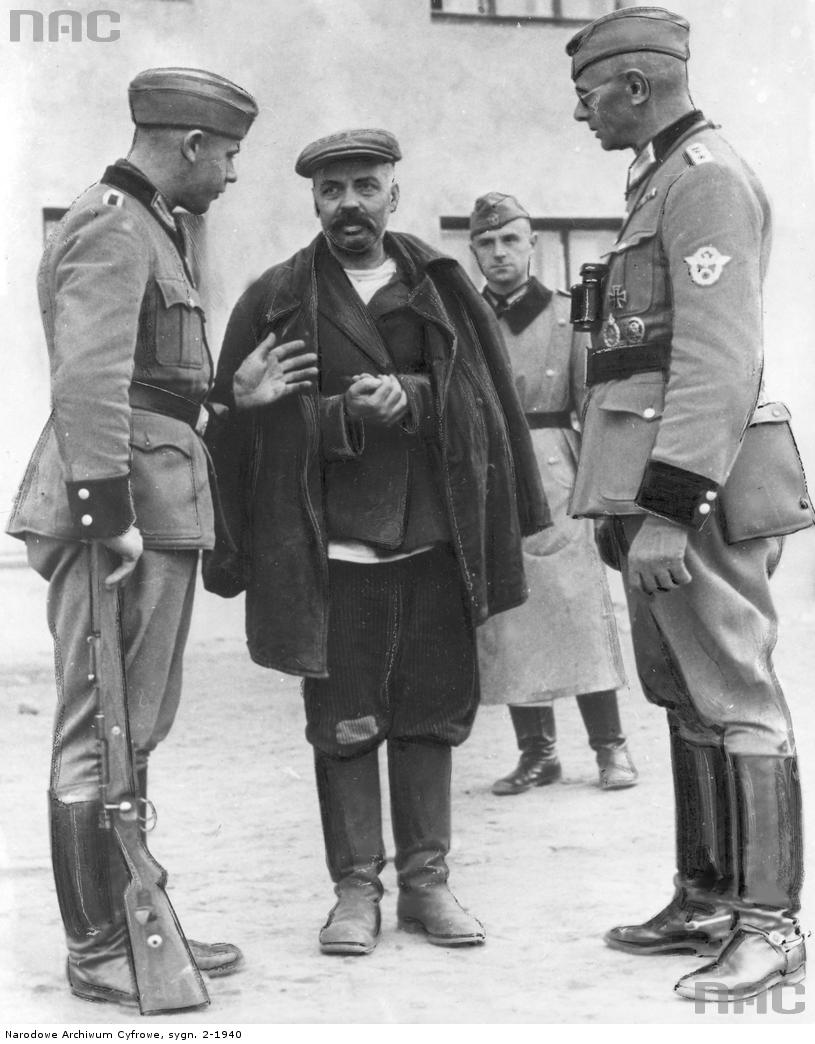
A German propaganda photograph purporting to show Romanov in civilian clothes after his capture

When Operation Barbarossa, the German invasion of the Soviet Union, began on 22 June, the 172nd was stationed at the Tesnitskoye Military Camp near Tula. In late June and early July, the division was rushed to the Belarusian city of Mogilev, where it became part of the 61st Rifle Corps of the 13th Army of the Western Front. There, Romanov organized the defense of the western bank of the Dnieper, blocking the Minsk–Mogilev and Mogilev–Bobruisk roads. As well as his own unit, Romanov ultimately controlled forces from the 110th Rifle Division, regiments or remnants of the 132nd, 137th, 160th, and 143rd Rifle Divisions, in addition to the remnants of the 20th Mechanized Corps; these formed the core of the city's defense. Immediately after it arrived, the city was besieged by German troops, whose first attack was made by elements of the 3rd Panzer Group against the division on 3 July. The defenders managed to repulse the attack and successive German attempts to cross the Dnieper, but were gradually worn down after 23 days in encirclement.

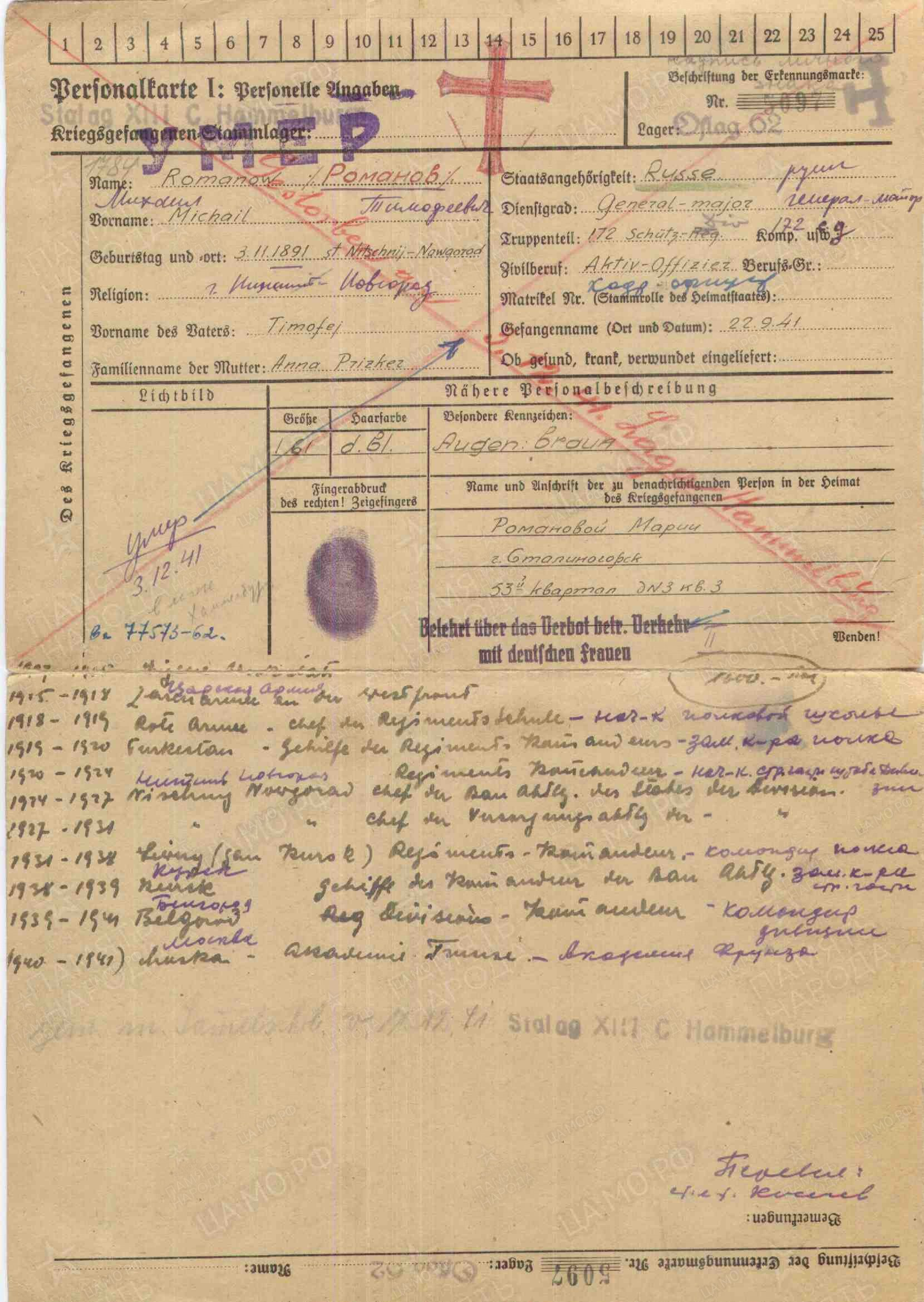
Personalkarte I of Romanov, used to register mainly Soviet prisoners of war

On the night of 26 to 27 July 61st Rifle Corps commander Major General Fyodor Bakunin ordered a breakout attempt after the garrison ran out of ammunition. Romanov was severely wounded in his left shoulder during the breakout. His column joined up with a German convoy under the cover of darkness but was spotted and destroyed. Romanov hid under the straw in a wagon and was sheltered by a peasant family in the village of Barsuki, 32 kilometers west of the city. He was captured there on 22 September and sent to the Lupolovo prisoner-of-war camp after being treated at a German hospital in Mogilev, according to an interrogation report written by a Police Regiment Centre officer. Within weeks, Romanov was transferred to the Hammelburg POW camp, dying of his wound there on 3 December 1941. He was erroneously reported by the testimony of released former Soviet prisoners of war to have died in July 1943. Romanov was awarded the Order of the Red Banner on 9 August 1941 for his leadership during the siege. He was survived by his wife, but his eldest son also died in the war.

== Legacy ==
A street in Mogilev was renamed in honor of Romanov in 1966; a bust of him was unveiled in the city in 2014.
