= Nikolai Vedeneyev =

Soviet army lieutenant general

- Native name: Николай Денисович Веденеев
- Born: 28 March 1897; Verkhnyaya Sanarka, Russian Empire
- Died: 16 November 1964 (aged 67) Moscow, Soviet Union
- Allegiance: Russian Empire; Soviet Union
- Branch: Imperial Russian Army; Red Army/Soviet Army
- Service years: 1915–17; 1918–51
- Rank: Lieutenant general
- Commands: 20th Mechanized Corps; 3rd Tank Corps/9th Guards Tank Corps
- Conflicts: World War I; Russian Civil War; World War II; Siege of Mogilev; Operation Bagration; Vistula-Oder Offensive; East Pomeranian Offensive; Battle of Berlin
- Awards: Hero of the Soviet Union; Order of Lenin; Order of the Red Banner; Order of Kutuzov, 1st class Order of Suvorov, 2nd class

Nikolai Denisovich Vedeneyev (Russian: Николай Денисович Веденеев; 28 March 1897 – 16 November 1964) was a Soviet Army lieutenant general and a Hero of the Soviet Union. Vedeneyev was drafted into the Imperial Russian Army and fought in World War I as a non-commissioned officer. He became a Red Guard and became a partisan on the Eastern Front of the Russian Civil War. Vedeneyev joined the Red Army and became a Political commissar. He held posts in cavalry units during the interwar period and later served in mechanized units. In 1938 he became chief of the commanders' improvement courses at the Military Academy of Mechanization and Motorization. Vedeneyev became chief of staff and deputy commander of the 6th Mechanized Corps in 1940, and then was deputy commander of the 20th Mechanized Corps.

After the German invasion of the Soviet Union, the corps was encircled in the Siege of Mogilev. Vedeneyev escaped the encirclement and later became head of the faculty at the Military Academy of Mechanization and Motorization. In April 1944 he returned to the front as the deputy commander of the 8th Guards Tank Corps. Vedeneyev took command of the 3rd Tank Corps, which became the 9th Guards Tank Corps. For his leadership of the corps in the Vistula–Oder Offensive, Vedeneyev received the title Hero of the Soviet Union. Postwar, he became head of combat training of the Soviet Army Armored and Mechanized Forces. In 1947, Vedeneyev again became head of the faculty at the Military Academy of Mechanization and Motorization, retiring in 1951.

== Early life, World War I, and Russian Civil War ==
Vedeneyev was born on 16 March 1897 in Verkhnyaya Sanarka in what is now Plastovsky District to a peasant family. He received primary education and worked as a telegraphist. In August 1915, he was drafted into the Imperial Russian Army. Vedeneyev served in a reserve battalion in Syzran and graduated from a training unit. In 1917, he fought on the Southwestern Front as a platoon sergeant in the 1st Rybinsk Border Regiment. Vedeneyev later served in the 531st Infantry Regiment of the 133rd Infantry Division.

In 1917, Vedeneyev joined the Communist Party of the Soviet Union and became a Red Guard. He fought in the Russian Civil War. From June 1918, he served with the Troitsk Partisan Group in the Volga region. The group had to break through from the Southern Urals to the north to link up with the consolidated Ural Partisan Army, which it was to become part of. The group moved 500 kilometers in more than a month, fighting Cossacks and the Czechoslovak Legion. Vedeneyev joined the Red Army in October 1918. He became a soldier in the 1st Orenburg Cossack Regiment named for Stepan Razin of the 30th Rifle Division. He soon became a platoon commander and led a machine gun unit. Vedeneyev was quickly selected for duty as a political commissar, and became the regiment's commissar. After the capture of Atbasar he became chairman of the city's Revolutionary Committee.

== Interwar years ==
In October 1920, Vedeneyev became commissar of the 73rd and 28th Cavalry Regiments in the 13th Siberian Cavalry Division, located in the West Siberian Military District. He fought in the suppression of the West Siberian Peasant Revolt. In March 1921, Vedeneyev became commissar of the division's supply department. Between December 1921 and March 1924, he was an instructor of the political department in the 4th Separate Cavalry Brigade and military commissar of the 74th Cavalry Regiment in Siberia and the Western Military District.

In 1925, Vedeneyev graduated from preparatory courses at the Lenin Military-Political Academy. In 1928 he graduated from the Frunze Military Academy. Vedeneyev became a squadron commander of the 88th Cavalry Regiment at Armavir in July 1928. In December 1929, he became head of the 1st staff department (operations) of the 5th Stavropol Cavalry Division in the North Caucasus Military District. In May 1931, Vedeneyev became commander and military commissar of the 25th Amur Cavalry Regiment. From March 1932, he was commander and commissar of the 1st Special Troitsko-Savskogo Cavalry Division of the Transbaikal Group. In February 1933, Vedeneyev became commander and commissar of the 15th Mechanized Regiment of the 15th Cavalry Division in the Transbaikal Military District. In November 1935, he became commander and commissar of the 26th Mechanized Regiment of the 26th Cavalry Division in the Kiev Military District. In 1936, he was awarded the Order of Lenin.

In July 1937, Vedeneyev became chief of staff of the 45th Mechanized Corps in the Kiev Military District. At the end of 1938, he was sent to Moscow and on 26 December became chief of the commanders' improvement courses at the Military Academy of Mechanization and Motorization. On 4 June 1940 he was appointed chief of staff and deputy commander of the 6th Mechanized Corps in the Western Special Military District. On the same day, Vedeneyev was promoted to major general. In March 1941, he became deputy commander of the 20th Mechanized Corps there.

== World War II ==
During the initial stages of the German invasion of the Soviet Union, Vedeneyev's corps fought in the Siege of Mogilev. On 21 July, Vedeneyev took command of the corps after corps commander Andrei Nikitin was wounded and evacuated. Vedeneyev escaped the city during the breakout and reached the lines of the Bryansk Front in late August. In October 1941, he was sent to Moscow and became a senior lecturer at the Military Academy of Mechanization and Motorization. In June 1942, he became head of faculty at the academy. In April 1944, Vedeneyev was appointed deputy commander of the 8th Guards Tank Corps. He participated in Operation Bagration. On 14 July, he became commander of the 3rd Tank Corps. On 22 July, units of the corps stopped and destroyed a German train carrying the Lublin garrison, which was attempting to escape. On 30 July, the corps had reached a point 15 kilometers from Warsaw, but was thrown back by German counterattacks, in the Battle of Radzymin. On 23 August, he was awarded the Order of Suvorov 2nd class. For its actions in the capture of Lublin and Dęblin, the corps became the 9th Guards Tank Corps on 20 November.

The Vistula–Oder Offensive began on 12 January 1945, and the corps was sent into battle on the next day. The corps moved at a speed of 30 to 40 kilometers a day. In three weeks they advanced over 500 kilometers. In February, the corps reached the Oder and captured a bridgehead in the Kustrin area. During the offensive, according to the 2nd Tank Army, the corps destroyed 74 tanks, 348 guns, 34 aircraft, killed 3,316 German troops, and captured 2,907. On 6 April, Vedeneyev was awarded the title Hero of the Soviet Union and the Order of Lenin for his leadership. In February and March, the corps fought in the East Pomeranian Offensive. On 16 April, the corps began the Battle of Berlin, advancing out of its bridgehead at Kustrin. On 23 April, the corps reached Berlin. On 29 May, Vedeneyev was awarded the Order of Kutuzov 1st class for his actions.

== Postwar ==
In June 1945, the corps became the 9th Guards Tank Division, which Vedeneyev, promoted to lieutenant general a few weeks later on 11 July, continued in command of. In October 1946, Vedeneyev became head of combat training of the Armored and Mechanized Forces. In March 1947, he became head of faculty at the Military Academy of Mechanization and Motorization. He retired in May 1951 and lived in Moscow. At some point, he was made an honorary citizen of Sieradz. Vedeneyev died on 16 November 1964 and was buried in the Vvedenskoye Cemetery.

== Awards and honors ==
| Hero of the Soviet Union (6 April 1945) |
| Order of Lenin, thrice (16 August 1936, 21 February 1945, 6 April 1945) |
| Order of the Red Banner, twice (3 November 1944, 20 June 1949) |
| Order of Suvorov, 2nd class (2 August 1944) |
| Order of Kutuzov, 1st class (28 January 1943) |
| Medal "For the Defence of Moscow" (1 May 1944) |
| Medal "For the Liberation of Warsaw" (9 June 1945) |
| Medal "For the Capture of Berlin" (9 June 1945) |
| Medal "For the Victory over Germany in the Great Patriotic War 1941–1945" (9 May 1945) |
| Jubilee Medal "XX Years of the Workers' and Peasants' Red Army" (1938) |
| Jubilee Medal "30 Years of the Soviet Army and Navy" (1948) |
| Jubilee Medal "40 Years of the Armed Forces of the USSR" (1958) |
| Medal "In Commemoration of the 800th Anniversary of Moscow" (1947) |
| Silver Cross of the Virtuti Militari (Poland) |
| Medal "For Warsaw 1939-1945" (Poland) |

A bust of Vedeneyev was installed in Plast.
