= 61st Rifle Corps =

- Active: First formation: 1939–1941; Second formation: 1943–1945
- Country: Soviet Union
- Branch: Red Army
- Type: Infantry
- Part of: Western Front 1941, Western Front 1943, 1st Belorussian Front 1944–45
- Engagements: World War II: Battle of Smolensk (1941); Battle of Smolensk (1943); Lublin–Brest Offensive; Battle of Berlin
- Battle honours: Radom (Second formation)

Commanders
- Notable commanders: Major General Fyodor Bakunin (1941); Lt. General Ivan Grigorievsky (1944–45)

The 61st Rifle Corps (Russian: 61-й стрелковый корпус 61-y strelkovy korpus ) was a Red Army infantry corps during World War II, formed twice. The 61st Rifle Corps was formed firmed in Tula during September 1939. After Operation Barbarossa, it was transferred to the front in Belarus and fought in the Battle of Smolensk. After suffering heavy losses at Smolensk, it was disbanded in early August 1941. Reformed in spring 1943, the corps fought in Operation Kutuzov, the Lublin–Brest Offensive and the Berlin Offensive. The corps was disbanded after the end of the war in summer 1945.

== First formation ==
The corps was formed in September 1939. It was stationed near Tula. The corps was commanded by Major General Fyodor Bakunin from April 1940. The corps began the war as part of the 20th Army. After the beginning of the war, it was moved to Belarus south of Mogilev and took defensive positions in the area of Škłou, Mogilev and Bykhaw.

From June 1941, the corps fought in the Battle of Smolensk. During the battle, it defended Mogilev and fought for Smolensk. On 1 July, it was composed of the 18th, 110th and 172nd Rifle Divisions. On 3 July, the vanguard of the 2nd Panzer Army reached the approaches to Mogilev and fought with the outposts of the corps.

On 7 July 1941, it was composed of the 53rd, 110th and 172nd Rifle Divisions. On the same day, the division moved to a defensive line on the banks of the Dnieper north of Mogilev. The new positions were on the line of Shkloŭ, Mogilev and Buinichi. Around this time, the corps was subordinated to the 13th Army.

On 10 July, the 2nd SS Panzer Division Das Reich of Heinrich von Vietinghoff's XXXXVI Motorized Corps advanced to the Dnieper in the Mogilev area. 10th Panzer Division also advanced to the river in the Shklov area. The 10th Panzer Division soon crossed the Dnieper and routed the corps' 53rd Rifle Division, capturing a bridgehead. Troops of the 61st Rifle Corps, 20th Mechanized Corps and 4th Airborne Corps were pushed back by the German advances. On 13 July, corps commander Bakunin was ordered to attack the 10th Panzer Division's bridgehead using the 110th Rifle Division and the 20th Mechanized Corps. The 20th Mechanized Corps was not equipped with tanks and did not have time to concentrate forces. As a result, the attack was repulsed. By 15 July, Mogilev was loosely encircled. It was now defended by the 61st Rifle Corps, most of the 20th Rifle Corps, remnants of the 148th and 187th Rifle Divisions, the 1st Motor Rifle Division, and the 26th and 38th Tank Divisions, as well as the 210th Motorized Division of the 20th Mechanized Corps.

On 17 July, the corps was concentrated in the area of Horoditshe, Dubrovka and Ordat. In the morning it attacked towards Kopys, but was stopped by German infantry from IX Army Corps. By 21 July, the corps composed most of the forces defending Mogilev and was surrounded by German troops. The 20th Mechanized Corps defended Tcherniavka, Ruditsy, Ordat and Horoditshe. The 110th Rifle Division defended Horoditshe, Kniazhitsy, Pletshitsy and Mostok. The remnants of the 137th Rifle Division defended near the village of Sukhari. On 23 July, the corps was forced to retreat to the line of Konstantinovka and Kamenka. Headquarters also lost contact with the 172nd Rifle Division, defending Mogilev. Under heavy attack from German troops and without resupply, the corps had retreated into the center of Mogilev by 24 July. The corps ran out of ammunition, food and fuel supplies by 25 July. Despite orders to the contrary from higher headquarters, Bakunin ordered the 61st Corps to break out of the encirclement towards Mstislavl and Roslavl on the night of 26–27 July. The 20th Mechanized Corps would advance in the vanguard and the most combat-ready troops of the 110th Rifle Division would form the rear guard. 172nd Rifle Division commander Major General Mikhail Romanov decided to break out of positions in Mogilev on his own. By this time, the remnants of the 1st Motor Rifle Division, 161st Rifle Division and other 20th Army units were in the corps positions. The wounded were left behind in the city. However, most of the 61st Rifle Corps was captured in the breakout attempt. After two days of heavy fighting and the total defeat of the corps, Bakunin ordered the remnants of the corps to move east in small groups. Bakunin personally led 140 troops of the corps out of the encirclement.

The 61st Rifle Corps was disbanded on 5 August 1941, although it had ceased to exist as an organized unit during the breakout from Mogilev.

== Second formation ==
The Corps was formed in the spring of 1943. It was part of the active army from 12 July 1943. At the time, the corps included the 51st, 62nd and 119th Rifle Divisions. The corps began combat on the Western Front with the 21st Army. It fought in Operation Suvorov. After fighting in the operation during the summer and early fall, the corps headquarters was transferred to the reserve.

From January to March 1944, the corps supervised the 62nd, 174th and 192nd Rifle Divisions. From April to May 1944, the corps attacked towards Orsha and Mogilev. At the beginning of May, the corps was composed of the 134th, 247th and 274th Rifle Divisions. On 22 May, corps commander Major General Alexander Ilyin was mortally wounded when his vehicle struck a mine and died of his wounds on 28 May. Ilyin was replaced in command by Major General Ivan Grigoryevsky. The corps was stationed north of Volodymyr-Volynsky and was part of the 69th Army of the 1st Belorussian Front.

During the Lublin–Brest Offensive, the corps advanced on the left flank of the 1st Belorussian Front, providing a link with the 1st Belorussian Front's 3rd Guards Army. On 20 July, elements of the corps crossed the Bug River in the Kladno, Jasienica, and Zagurnik areas. These units attacked towards Lublin. On 29 July, assault battalions of the 61st and 91st Rifle Corps crossed the Vistula near Puławy, where they captured a bridgehead on the western bank. This bridgehead would later become known as the Puławy Bridgehead. By 1 August, the 134th Rifle Division had captured Bzhestse and had repulsed German counterattacks. The corps began to expand the bridgehead, advancing to Nasiluv and Janowiec.

In January 1945, the corps broke out of the bridgehead in the East Prussian Offensive. On 14 January, assault battalions launched the offensive and broke through German lines by the end of the day. The 11th Tank Corps attacked through the break in the German lines. With tank support, the 134th and 274th Rifle Divisions of the corps captured Radom on 16 January. The corps continued the offensive and crossed the Pilica and Warta. It also captured Tomaszów Lubelski and Jarocin. By the end of January, it reached the Oder north of Frankfurt-an-der-Oder. By Stavka Order No. 9 of 19 February 1945, the corps was given the honorific "Radom" for its actions in the offensive.

In April 1945, the corps fought in the Berlin Offensive. On 16 April, the corps went on the offensive from its bridgehead north of Frankfurt and broke through German lines. During the offensive, it reached the Spree near Fürstenwalde, where large German forces were positioned. The corps then fought in the Battle of Halbe against the encircled 9th Army. By 25 April, the 9th Army was pushed back to Luckenwalde, where it was destroyed. On 26 April, the 61st Rifle Corps captured Treuenbrietzen and advanced to the Elbe near Magdeburg. On 1 May, it linked up with American troops.

An order of 29 May 1945, connected to the formation of the Group of Soviet Forces in Germany, ordered the disbandment of a number of rifle corps, including the 61st.

== Corps command ==
External images
- ru:Файл:BakuninFA.jpg Major-General F.A.Bakunin
- ru:Файл:Генерал-майор Григорьевский Иван Фёдорович и гв. полковник Власенко Илья Архипович.jpeg Major General I.F.Grigorievsky and Guards Colonel I.A.Vlasenko

Command appointments within the corps were as follows:

Commander:

- Major General F.A.Bakunin
- Major General A.M. Ilyin (10 July 1943 – 28 May 1944; KIA)
- Lieutenant General I.F.Grigorievsky (28 May 1944 – July 1945)

Military commissar:

- Brigade Commissar I.V.Voronov (KIA 26 July 1941 during the breakout)
- Colonel I.A.Vlasenko (June 1944 – June 1945)

Chief of staff:

- Major General Ivan Biritchev (wounded 6 July 1941)
- Lieutenant Colonel A.N.Koriakov
- Lieutenant Colonel Asafov
