= Siege of Mogilev =

1941 battle of World War II

- Part of the Battle of Smolensk
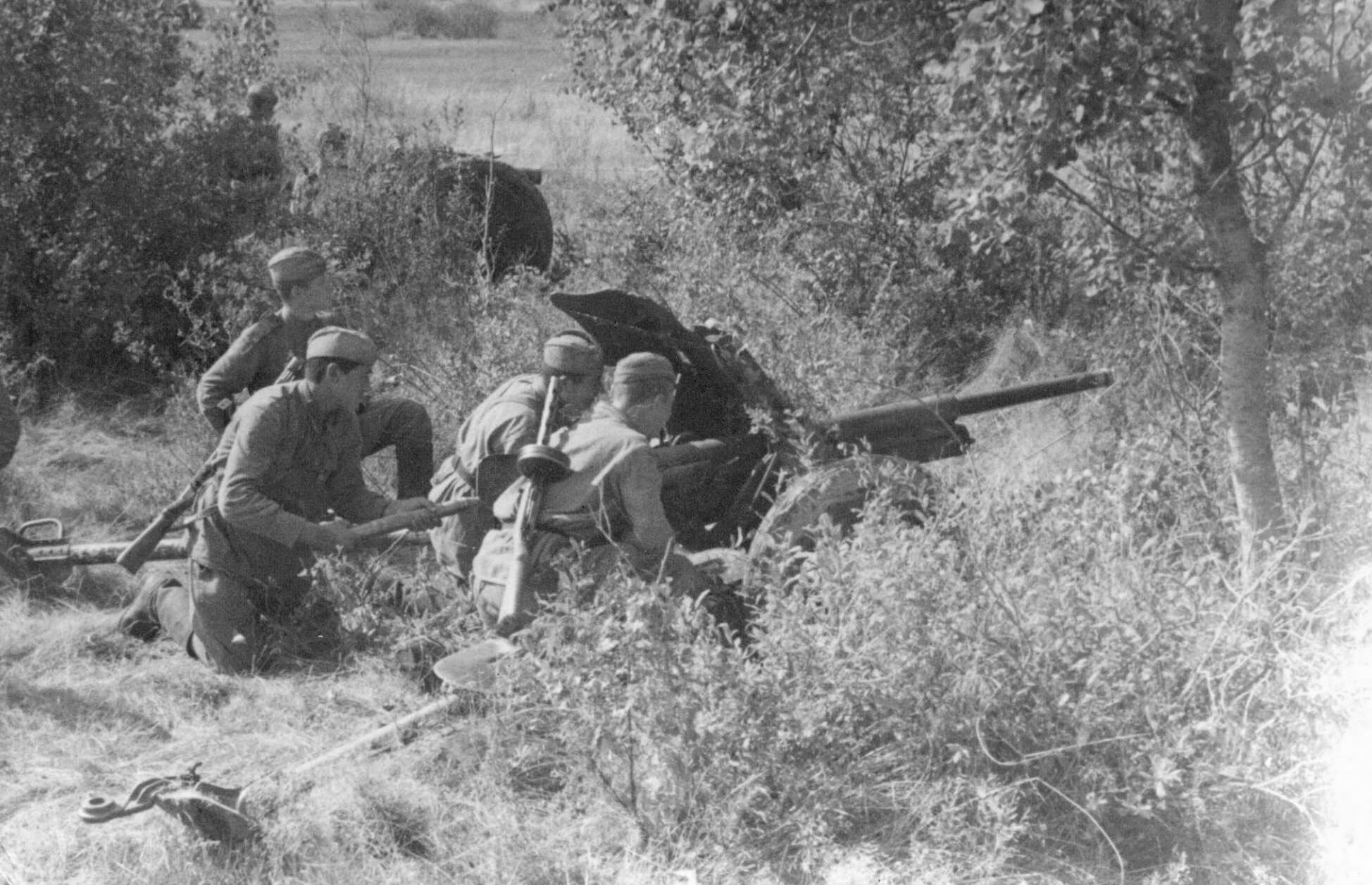
- Soviet artillerymen from the 2nd Guards Cavalry Corps near eastern Belarus
Date	3–26 July 1941
Location	Mogilev, Byelorussian SSR, Soviet Union 53°55′N 30°21′E
Result	German victory

Belligerents
Germany	Soviet Union

Commanders and leaders
(Nazi Germany) Heinz Guderian (Nazi Germany) Wilhelm Fahrmbacher	(Soviet Union) Fyodor Bakunin (Soviet Union) Pyotr Filatov †

Units involved
(Nazi Germany) VII Army Corps	(Soviet Union) 61st Rifle Corps; (Soviet Union) 20th Mechanized Corps

The siege of Mogilev was a three-week encirclement of Mogilev undertaken by German troops, part of the Battle of Smolensk during World War II. After the beginning of Operation Barbarossa, the German invasion of the Soviet Union, German troops broke through Soviet lines. Mogilev was heavily fortified and bypassed by German tank forces. German infantry steadily reduced the pocket, and by late July, the defending Soviet troops had run out of ammunition and other necessary supplies. As a result, Soviet commander Fyodor Bakunin went against orders and ordered a breakout. A small number of Soviet troops were able to reach Soviet lines, and 35,000 were reported captured by German troops. The defense of Mogilev tied down four German infantry divisions, delaying their attack on Gomel for a week.

== Background ==
In late June, Soviet troops began constructing defenses around Mogilev and on the Drut River 19 kilometers to the west of the city. The city's buildings were fortified and minefields and trenches were created. Attacks from the XXXXVII Motorized Corps and the XXIV Motorized Corps were repulsed. Heinz Guderian, commander of Panzer Group 2, decided to bypass the city instead of attacking it. He ordered the XXXXVI and XXIV Motorized Corps to head for the Sozh River.

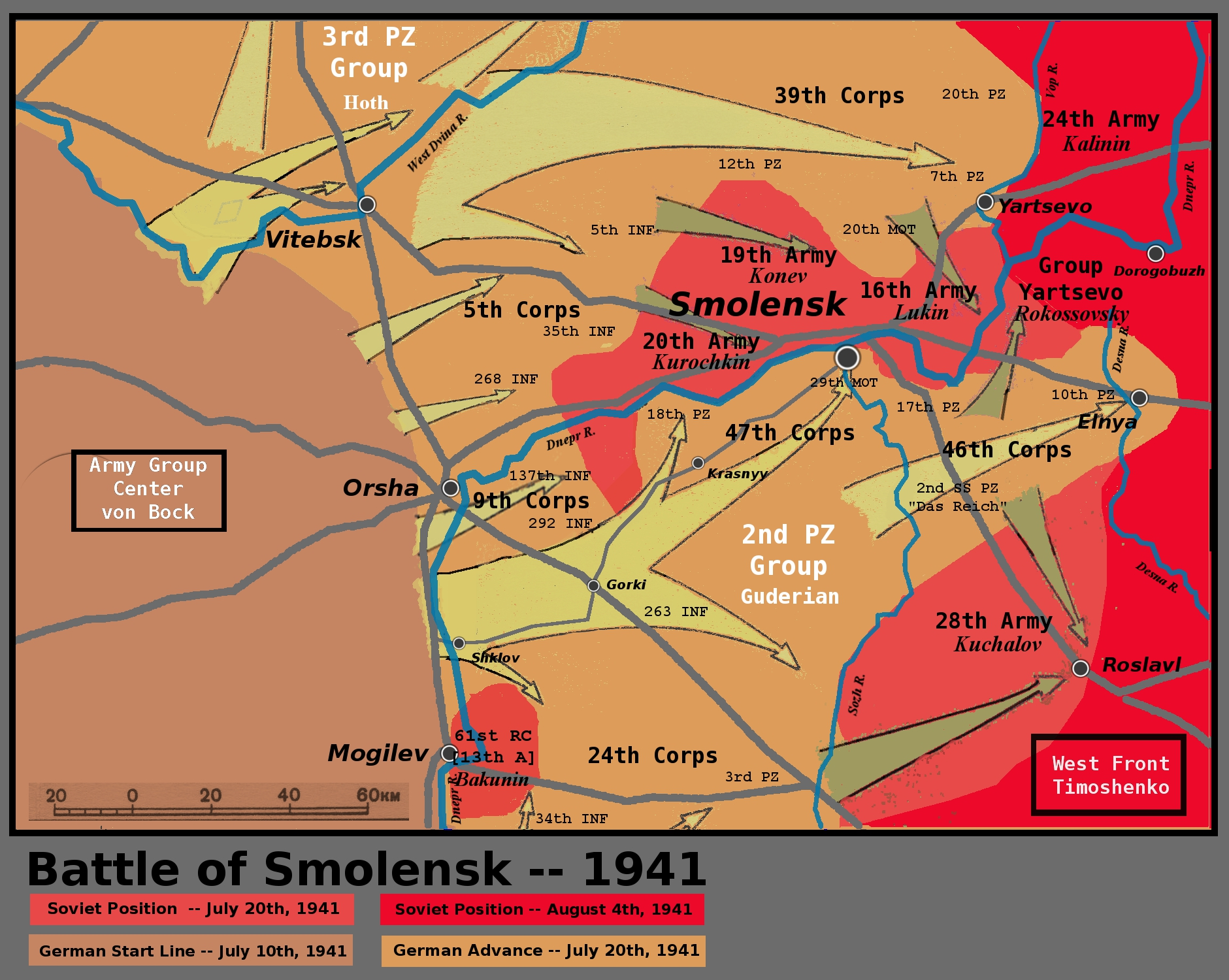
Map of the Battle of Smolensk, showing the siege of Mogilev

== Siege ==
=== Encirclement of Mogilev ===
On 13 July, 13th Army commander Vasily Gerasimenko withdrew his army east towards the Sozh River, leaving the forces in Mogilev under the command of 61st Rifle Corps commander Fyodor Bakunin.

XXXXVI Motorized Corps' SS Das Reich Motorized Division took blocking positions north of Chausy to prevent Soviet units at Mogilev from escaping to the northeast on 13 July. The XXIV Motorized Corps advanced east from the Bykhov bridgehead on 14 July. Chausy and Propoysk were captured the next day, completing the encirclement of Mogilev. Along with the Grossdeutschland Motorized Infantry Regiment and the SS Das Reich Motorized Division, the 3rd Panzer and 10th Motorized Divisions of XXIV Motorized Corps maintained the encirclement until 17 July. At this time, the Soviet troops in Mogilev included the 61st Rifle Corps' 53rd Rifle Division, 110th Rifle Division, and 172nd Rifle Division, the 20th Mechanized Corps' 26th and 38th Tank and 210th Motorized Divisions. Most of the 20th Rifle Corps' 132nd, 137th, and 160th Rifle Divisions were also in the encirclement, along with parts of the 148th and 187th Rifle Divisions from the 48th Rifle Corps, and the 1st Motorized Division.

On the night of 16 July, Gerasimenko ordered all troops of the 13th Army except for the 61st Rifle Corps and the 20th Mechanized Corps to withdraw east to the Sozh. A group led by 172nd Rifle Division commander Mikhail Romanov was the core of the defense. Romanov's group included the 110th and 172nd Rifle Divisions, remnants or regiments from the 132nd, 137th, 160th, and 143rd Rifle Divisions, as well as the remnants of the 20th Mechanized Corps. The Soviet defenders also included units of the People's Militia.

=== Attacks of VII Army Corps ===
Between 16 and 17 July, the troops of the German 2nd Army reached the Dnieper. After relieving the units of Panzer Group 2, 2nd Army commander Maximilian von Weichs ordered VII Army Corps commander Wilhelm Fahrmbacher to lead the operations to take Mogilev. On 20 July, the 7th Infantry Division and 23rd Infantry Division attacked the city from the west. The attack was repulsed by entrenched Soviet troops and artillery fire. German troops crossed the Dnieper on the northern and southern flanks of the position, capturing a bridge over the Dnieper and breaking through Soviet defenses near Buinichi, only 8 kilometers from the center of the city. The 15th and 78th Infantry Divisions became part of the VII Army Corps so that it could close the encirclement. The 15th Infantry Division was placed between the 7th and 23rd Divisions, and the 78th was located southeast of the city. On 21 July the 9th Regiment of the 23rd Division outflanked Soviet positions on a bridge into Mogilev from the southeast, capturing it after heavy fighting. The 23rd broke through the Soviet inner defenses along the bend of the Dnieper and repulsed multiple heavy counterattacks. Late that day, Bakunin reported to 21st Army headquarters, stating that artillery shells had been "used up" and requesting more ammunition. TB-3 bombers had attempted to airdrop supplies, although a large number landed behind German lines and a large number retrieved by Soviet troops were of the incorrect caliber. Elements of the 1st Motorized Division fought their way into the encirclement from the north.

On 22 July the 78th Infantry Division repulsed an attempt by Soviet troops to fight into the pocket from the northeast. It also repulsed an attempt by the 61st Rifle Corps to break out of the encirclement in its eastern sector. During the night the attacks of the 78th Infantry Division broke through the southern part of the Soviet lines, capturing 5,000 and large numbers of equipment. To stop the supply drops, German troops deployed Barrage balloons. On 24 July, the 23rd, 15th, 7th, and 78th Infantry Divisions advanced to the center of the city, beginning street fighting. By late 25 July, the Soviet troops in Mogilev had used up all of the ammunition, food, and fuel.

=== Soviet breakout ===
Bakunin ordered Soviet troops in Mogilev to break out to the east on the night of 26–27 July, by which point the troops had almost entirely run out of ammunition. This contravened orders from higher headquarters. Thousands of wounded Soviet troops were left behind in the city with doctors. A small number of Soviet troops were able to escape and reach Soviet lines. Romanov was captured after his column attempted to join up with a German convoy and was destroyed.

== Aftermath ==
Western Front commander Semyon Timoshenko reported on 27 July that Bakunin had been turned over to a military tribunal for his ordering the breakout. German troops reported capturing 35,000 soldiers and 245 guns during the operation. The 23rd Infantry Division lost more than 1,000 men in the operation. The defense of Mogilev prevented German troops from using its bridges for a week, although German troops built temporary bridges over the Dnieper in six other places. The siege of Mogilev delayed 2nd Army's attack on Gomel for more than a week. This delay allowed Timoshenko to bring up reinforcements for the Battle of Smolensk. Mogilev later was called "Gallant Mogilev" and "the Belarusian Madrid" in Soviet sources.
