= Leninsk-Kuznetsky =

Leninsk-Kuznetsky (masculine), Leninsk-Kuznetskaya (feminine), or Leninsk-Kuznetskoye (neuter) may refer to:

- Leninsk-Kuznetsky (city), a city in Kemerovo Oblast, Russia
  - Leninsk-Kuznetsky Urban Okrug, a municipal formation which that city is incorporated as
- Leninsk-Kuznetsky District, a district of Kemerovo Oblast, Russia

== See also ==
- Leninsk (disambiguation)
- Kuznetsky (disambiguation)
- FC Zarya Leninsk-Kuznetsky
