= Kuznetsky =

Kuznetsky (masculine), Kuznetskaya (feminine), Kuznetskoye (neuter) or Kuznetskiye (plural) may refer to:

- Kuznetsky District, name of several districts in Russia
- Kuznetsky (rural locality) (Kuznetskaya, Kuznetskoye), name of several rural localities in Russia
