= Nikolai Bezzubov =

Red Army colonel (1902–1943)

Nikolai Aleksandrovich Bezzubov
- Николай Анександович Беззубов
- Bezzubov, c. 1940
- Born: 11 December 1902; Zheludki, Kostroma Governorate, Russian Empire
- Died: 20 July 1943 (aged 40) near Rakitnoye, Russian SFSR, Soviet Union
- Military career
- Allegiance: Soviet Union
- Branch: Red Army
- Service years: 1924–1943
- Rank: Colonel
- Commands: 110th Rifle Division; 100th Rifle Division
- Conflicts: World War II (DOW)
- Awards: Order of Lenin; Order of the Red Banner (3x)

Nikolai Aleksandrovich Bezzubov (Russian: Николай Александрович Беззубов; 11 December 1902 – 20 July 1943) was a Red Army colonel who held division command during World War II.

== Early life and prewar service ==
Nikolai Aleksandrovich Bezzubov was born on 11 December 1902 in the village of Zheludki, Kurilovskoy volost, Makaryevsky Uyezd, Kostroma Governorate. Conscripted into the Red Army on 1 May 1924, Bezzubov was sent to the Galich Military Depot. From July to December he completed training at the divisional school of the 18th Rifle Division, then served as a squad leader and assistant platoon commander in the regimental school of the 54th Rifle Regiment of the division. Bezzubov chose to become a career soldier and entered the Ryazan Infantry School in September 1927, Bezzubov was appointed to the 131st Tarashcha Rifle Regiment of the 44th Rifle Division of the Ukrainian Military District upon his graduation in April 1930. With the 131st, he served successively as an assistant company commander for the political section, as commander and politruk of the machine gun training company, and as a battalion commander.

Bezzubov left the division in June 1938 to serve as chief of the course for junior lieutenants of the 8th Rifle Corps at Zhitomir, and in November of that year transferred to the 243rd Rifle Regiment of the 81st Rifle Division of the Kiev Special Military District. After serving as a battalion commander and assistant regimental commander for personnel, he was appointed commander of the 556th Rifle Regiment of the 169th Rifle Division on 16 August 1939. The 169th became part of the 37th Rifle Corps of the 6th Army, taking part in the Soviet invasion of Poland. In February 1940 then-Captain Bezzubov was seconded to the Novograd-Volynsky Infantry School to serve as a battalion commander, and in December sent to the Vystrel course to receive advanced training for regimental commanders.

== World War II ==
After Operation Barbarossa began, then-Major Bezzubov graduated from the course and was appointed commander of the 3rd Rifle Regiment of the 1st Moscow People's Militia Rifle Division (Leninsky District). After being brought up to strength and equipped, the division joined the 33rd Army of the Reserve Front and took positions in the region of Spas-Demensk, where it entered combat. In five days of fighting encircled by superior German forces, the division managed to inflict significant losses in manpower and equipment through a stubborn defense and constant counterattacks. In the region of Roslavl, the division broke out of encirclement and fought its way back to Soviet lines at Tarutino. The division was redesignated as the 60th Rifle Division on 26 September, and his regiment accordingly became the 1283rd Rifle Regiment. During the Vyazma defensive operation in early October, the division fought on the line of the Desna in the region of Kholmets, and in the face of the German advance retreated to the region northwest of Spas-Demensk, where it was encircled. Bezzubov led a detachment of 150 men out of the encirclement in the region of the Tashirovo bend northwest of Naro-Fominsk, near the sector of the 1st Guards Motor Rifle Division's 175th Motor Rifle Regiment, on 22 October. 33rd Army commander Mikhail Yefremov ordered Bezzubov to take command of a detachment consisting of his group and the leaderless remnants of the 1289th Rifle Regiment of the 110th Rifle Division, who had just fought their way out of encirclement in the vicinity. Bezzubov's detachment was tasked with defending along the eastern bank of the Nara to the right of the 175th Motor Rifle Regiment. His detachment played a major role in the defense of Naro-Fominsk.

When the forward units of the German 258th Infantry Division reached the settlements of Tashirovo and Novinskoye, five to six kilometers northwest of Naro-Fominsk, on the night of 21–22 October, Bezzubov's detachment of a few hundred men, equal to two battalions, was the only unit between them and the city. That night, reinforcements were brought up and Yefremov ordered an attack to push the Germans back from the outskirts of Naro-Fominsk. But due to a lack of intelligence on the German strength, Yefremov's objectives proved unrealistic. After a short artillery bombardment, Bezzubov's detachment attacked at 05:30 in the region of Konopelovka, seeking to take a bridgehead on the western bank of the Nara near Tashirovo. The 258th Infantry Division easily repulsed his attack and the detachment retreated back to the eastern bank.

In late October and early November the regiment operated as part of the 1st Guards Motor Rifle Division. In the battles for Naro-Fominsk, Bezzubov demonstrated "high organizational skill and forceful qualities, courage, fortitude, and bravery." For his performance in the battles near Naro-Fominsk, 1st Guards Motor Rifle Division commander Alexander Lizyukov recommended Bezzubov for the Order of the Red Banner, which was awarded on 3 December. The recommendation read:

Comrade Bezzubov has commanded a rifle regiment attached to the division, since the first days of the battles near Narofominsk. During this period Comrade Bezzubov displayed high organizational abilities and strong will, necessary for a regimental commander. In the battles near Narofominsk, Comrade Bezzubov displayed bravery, steadfastness, and courage, giving an example to subordinates, carrying them into battle against the Fascists. He is deserving of the award of the Order of the Red Banner.

Bezzubov took command of the 110th Rifle Division on 8 December, after the elimination of the German penetration at Kubinka and on the eve of the 33rd Army's general offensive on Borovsk. In late December he personally met the units of the division's 1291st Rifle Regiment, breaking out of encirclement after five days without provisions. He led it in the Rzhev-Vyazma Offensive, during which it captured Vereya. In February 1942, the division entered the region southeast of Vyazma and in cooperation with the main forces attempted to capture the city. Bring up reserves, the German forces counterattacked and cut off part of the 33rd Army, including the 110th. Until July, the division fought in encirclement, then rejoined the main forces of the front in the region of Vyazma. After escaping the encirclement and screening Bezzubov, promoted to colonel on 15 June, was placed at the disposal of the Personnel Department of the front to await a new assignment.

Appointed acting commander of the 10th Motor Rifle Brigade on 28 August, Bezzubov transferred to serve as deputy commander of the 303rd Rifle Division on 12 March 1943. With the 3rd Tank Army, the division fought in the Third Battle of Kharkov before joining the 57th Army of the Southwestern Front on 26 April. The division took up defenses on the eastern bank of the Seversky Donets from Krasny to Novodonovka in May. Bezzubov took command of the 100th Rifle Division on 28 June and led it as part of the 40th Army of the Voronezh Front, holding a defensive line on the Psel in the region of the settlements of Belaya and Ivka. During the defensive phase of the Battle of Kursk, while his division engaged in desultory fighting involving periodic shelling, Bezzubov was seriously wounded by a landmine on 19 July and died of wounds the night of 19–20 July. His body was taken to the army and buried in a mass grave in Beloye, Kursk Oblast. Bezzubov was survived by his wife, evacuated to Semipalatinsk during the war.

== Awards ==
Bezzubov was a recipient of the following decorations:

- Order of Lenin
- Order of the Red Banner
- Order of the Red Star
- Medals
