= 20th Mechanized Corps =

- Active: 1941
- Country: Soviet Union
- Branch: Red Army
- Type: Mechanized corps
- Engagements: World War II: Battle of Białystok–Minsk; Battle of Smolensk

Commanders
- Notable commanders: Nikolai Vedeneyev

The 20th Mechanized Corps (Military Unit Number 2802) was a mechanized corps of the Red Army. Formed in March 1941, the corps was almost entirely destroyed in the Battle of Białystok–Minsk and the Battle of Smolensk, in which it defended Mogilev.

== History ==
=== Formation ===
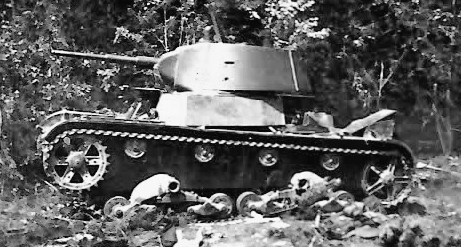
A destroyed T-26 of the type used by the corps

The 20th Mechanized Corps was formed in March and April 1941 from elements of the 4th Don Cossack Cavalry Division and the Borisov Automobile, Tank, and Cavalry Schools. Corps headquarters was located in Borisov. It included the 26th and 38th Tank Divisions, and the 210th Motorized Division. The 26th Tank Division was located at Krasnoye Urochishche, the 38th Tank Division at Novoborisov, and the 210th Motorized Division at Osipovichi. The corps was commanded by Major General Andrei Nikitin.

=== Defense of Minsk area ===
On 22 June, Germany invaded the Soviet Union in Operation Barbarossa. The corps fought in the Battle of Białystok–Minsk. The corps was not yet fully formed and was at cadre strength. Between 22 and 27 June the corps fought in battles in the Minsk area, unsuccessfully attempting to stop the German advance towards the city. On 26 June it was ordered to conduct a counterattack with the 4th Airborne Corps at Slutsk. The corps attacked with its 93 outdated light tanks (80 T-26 tanks and 13 BT tanks) and the 4th Airborne Corps advanced on foot instead of conducting an air assault due to a lack of transport aircraft. Both units were unable to stop the German advance. On 30 June the Svisloch Railroad Bridge, defended by the 4th Airborne Corps, was captured by the 4th Panzer Division, cutting off most of the 20th Mechanized Corps and a 4th Airborne Corps brigade. The corps and other remnants of Soviet units delayed the advance of the XXXXVI Motorized Corps with their resistance.

=== Defense of Mogilev ===
By 1 July it was part of the 13th Army. On 7 July the corps included about 12,000 men with 27 guns and no tanks. From 9 to 27 July it fought in and was destroyed in the Mogilev pocket. By the end of 15 July the corps was defending Mogilev alongside the 61st Rifle Corps and remnants of several divisions. On 21 July deputy corps commander Major General Nikolai Vedeneyev took command after Nikitin was wounded and evacuated. At this time the corps defended Mogilev's eastern approaches. By 25 July, the Soviet troops in Mogilev were running out of ammunition, food and fuel. 61st Rifle Corps commander Fyodor Bakunin made the decision to withdraw against orders and called a meeting with Vedeneyev and three of the division commanders on the breakout plan. The 20th Mechanized Corps would lead the breakout towards the general direction of Roslavl. That night, the corps began the breakout. In the morning, the corps ran into the German 78th Infantry Division at the village of Samulki. Supported by vehicles from an attached reconnaissance battalion, the corps fought on foot and attacked the German positions. The attack was stopped by heavy German machine gun fire. Bakunin ordered the destruction of remaining equipment and ordered the survivors to disperse and break out in small groups. Between 27 and 28 July the corps broke out of the pocket with 100 to 200 men left. The perechen (list of Soviet units during World War II) does not state that the corps was disbanded, although it lost most of its men during the battles in the Mogilev Pocket. The corps last appears on the combat composition of the Soviet Army list for 10 July 1941.

== Sources ==
- Forczyk, Robert (2014). Tank Warfare on the Eastern Front 1941–1942: Schwerpunkt. Barnsley, South Yorkshire: Pen & Sword. ISBN 9781781590089.
- Glantz, David M. (2010). Barbarossa Derailed: The German Advance to Smolensk, the Encirclement Battle, and the First and Second Soviet Counteroffensives, 10 July – 24 August 1941. Philadelphia: Casemate. ISBN 9781906033729.
