= Andrey Nikitin (general) =

Andrey Grigoryevich Nikitin
- Nikitin in 1940
- Born: 28 September 1891; Khlebny khutor, Kachalinskaya stanitsa, Don Host Oblast, Russian Empire
- Died: 4 February 1957 (aged 65) Simferopol, Soviet Union
- Allegiance: Russian Empire; Russian SFSR; Soviet Union
- Branch: Imperial Russian Army; Red Army (later Soviet Army)
- Service years: 1913–1917; 1918–1946
- Rank: Major general
- Commands: 11th Cavalry Division; 4th Cavalry Division; 20th Mechanized Corps
- Conflicts: World War I; Russian Civil War; Polish–Soviet War; World War II
- Awards: Order of Lenin; Order of the Red Banner (2)

Andrey Grigoryevich Nikitin (Russian: Андрей Григорьевич Никитин; 28 September 1891 – 4 February 1957) was a Red Army major general.

Drafted into the Imperial Russian Army just before World War I, Nikitin fought in the war as a non-commissioned officer with a Cossack cavalry regiment. Joining the Red Army during the Russian Civil War, he served as an assistant regimental commander with a division of the 1st Cavalry Army. Nikitin commanded a cavalry regiment during the 1920s and rose to cavalry division command in the 1930s. At the outbreak of Operation Barbarossa, he commanded the 20th Mechanized Corps in Belarus. After his unit suffered heavy losses during the Battle of Białystok–Minsk, Nikitin was wounded and evacuated during the Siege of Mogilev. He never held another combat command during the rest of the war and served as an army deputy commander, cavalry inspector, reserve brigade commander, and division deputy commander, being dogged by repeated unsatisfactory performance evaluations. As a result, Nikitin retired soon after the end of World War II.

== Early life, World War I, and Russian Civil War ==
Nikitin was born to a peasant family on 28 September 1891 in the khutor of Khlebny, Kachalinskaya stanitsa of the Don Host Oblast, and completed primary school. He was drafted into the Imperial Russian Army in January 1913 and graduated from the training detachment of the 4th Don Cossack Regiment later that year. During World War I, he fought on the Western Front with the regiment as a ryadovoy, uryadnik, and platoon commander. After returning from the front in February 1918, he became chairman of the revolutionary committee of the 2nd Don Okrug in Kachalinskaya.

Nikitin joined the Red Army in May 1918 during the Russian Civil War and became commander of a sotnya of the 5th Soviet Cossack Regiment on the Tsaritsyn Front, then became a squadron commander in the 4th Peasant Cavalry Regiment of the Brigade under the command of Bulatnikov from October of that year. He became assistant commander of the 22nd Voronezh Cavalry Regiment of the Separate Cavalry Division (the 4th Cavalry Division from March) of the 10th Army in January 1919. The division became part of Semyon Budyonny's Cavalry Corps in June 1919, which was expanded into the 1st Cavalry Army in November of that year. With the division, Nikitin fought on the Southern Front in the Battle of Tsaritsyn and the territory of the Don Host Oblast in the Voronezh–Kastornoye Operation, the Kharkov Operation, the Donbass Operation, the Rostov–Novocherkassk Operation, the North Caucasus Operation, and the Battle of Yegorlykskaya.

From May 1920 he and the division with the army fought in the Polish–Soviet War on the Southwestern Front in operations in the direction of Zhitomir, Novograd-Volynsky, and Lvov and in the area of Zamość. After the cease-fire in the Polish-Soviet War the 1st Cavalry Army was transferred to the Southern Front to fight against the Army of Wrangel. Nikitin participated in fighting in Northern Taurida and Crimea in October and the elimination of the Revolutionary Insurrectionary Army of Ukraine in November. For his courage in battle, he was awarded the Order of the Red Banner in 1920.

== Interwar period ==
After the end of the war, Nikitin continued to serve with the 4th Cavalry Division as commander of the 21st Don-Stavropol Cavalry Regiment. He studied at the Cavalry Officers Improvement Course of the Higher Military School in Moscow between November 1924 and August 1925 and the Cavalry Officers Improvement Course at Novocherkassk between November 1929 and April 1930. Nikitin entered the Frunze Military Academy in February 1932 and after graduation from its special faculty in November 1934 became assistant commander of the 11th Orenburg Cavalry Division. When the Red Army introduced personal military ranks in 1935, he received the rank of kombrig on 26 November of that year. He transferred to hold the same position with the 6th Cavalry Division in June 1937 and in December of that year he became acting commander of the 11th Cavalry Division. Nikitin commanded the 4th Cavalry Division as part of the 6th Cavalry Corps of the Belorussian Special Military District from April 1939 and was promoted to komdiv on 4 November of that year. He became a major general when the Red Army introduced general officer ranks on 4 June 1940 and took command of the 20th Mechanized Corps of the Western Special Military District (the former Belorussian Special Military District), formed from the 4th Cavalry Division, in February 1941.

== World War II ==
After the beginning of the German invasion of the Soviet Union, Operation Barbarossa, on 22 June 1941, Nikitin led the corps in the Battle of Białystok–Minsk as part of the Western Front. The corps fought in the area of Pukhovichy, on the Berezina River, and north of Bobruisk. After the corps lost all its tanks in an unsuccessful counterattack, it retreated to Mogilev, whose garrison Nikitin commanded during the Siege of Mogilev until being wounded and evacuated on 16 July. After the destruction of the corps, he was appointed deputy commander of the 49th Army. In this position, Nikitin participated in the Mozhaysk–Maloyaroslavets Defensive Operation, the Tula and Kaluga Offensives during the Battle of Moscow, and the Rzhev–Vyazma Offensive. He served as inspector of the cavalry of the Bryansk Front from March 1942. Red Army cavalry inspector General Oka Gorodovikov evaluated Nikitin's performance in this position as that of a "disciplined and demanding commander able to instill iron military discipline", before Nikitin went to Moscow on 1 August.

Despite Gorodovikov's evaluation, Nikitin was not given a combat command but instead was sent to the Ural Military District in October to form the 3rd Training Rifle Brigade in Tyumen, which he was appointed commander of. Placed at the disposal of the Cadre Department of the Red Army in May 1943, Nikitin became commander of the 5th Reserve Cavalry Brigade of the North Caucasus Military District in October of that year. He was evaluated as "failing to establish the right relationship with the [brigade] officers," which was "reflected in the combat training of the brigade," and as a result was relieved in June 1944, being placed at the disposal of the Commander-in-Chief of the Red Army Cavalry. Nikitin was sent back to the front in August as deputy commander of the 32nd Cavalry Division of the 3rd Guards Cavalry Corps of the 2nd Belorussian Front, participating in the East Prussian Offensive. Another negative evaluation, that he "showed his low training by allowing regimental commanders to withdraw units from captured positions" during the offensive, resulted in his relief in February 1945. Nikitin became acting inspector of cavalry of the 2nd Ukrainian Front in April, ending the war in that position.

== Postwar ==
Nikitin was placed at the disposal of the Commander-in-Chief of the Red Army Cavalry again after the end of the war, and retired in April 1946. He died on 4 February 1957 in Simferopol.

== Awards and honors ==
Nikitin was a recipient of the following decorations:

- Order of Lenin
- Order of the Red Banner (2)
