= Kachalinskaya =

Kachalinskaya Качалинская
- Stanitsa
- Location within Volgograd Oblast Location within Russia
- Coordinates: 49°06′N 44°01′E
- Country: Russia
- Region: Volgograd Oblast
- District: Ilovlinsky District
- Time zone: UTC+4:00

Kachalinskaya (Russian: Качалинская) is a rural locality (a stanitsa) in Kachalinskoye Rural Settlement, Ilovlinsky District, Volgograd Oblast, Russia. The population was 442 as of 2010. There are 14 streets.

== Geography ==
Kachalinskaya is located 39 km south of Ilovlya (the district's administrative centre) by road. Kachalino is the nearest rural locality.
