= Fyodor Bakunin =

Soviet major general (1898–1984)

- Native name: Фёдор Алексеевич Бакунин
- Born: 2 March 1898; Staroye Ilmovo, Chistopolsky Uyezd, Kazan Governorate, Russian Empire
- Died: 22 January 1984 (aged 81) Krasnodar, Krasnodar Krai, RSFSR, Soviet Union
- Allegiance: Russian Provisional Government; Russian SFSR; Soviet Union
- Branch: Imperial Russian Army; Red Army (later Soviet Army)
- Service years: 1917; 1919–1947
- Rank: Major general
- Commands: 11th Rifle Division; 2nd Rifle Corps; 61st Rifle Corps; 63rd Rifle Corps
- Conflicts: Russian Civil War; World War II
- Awards: Order of Lenin; Order of the Red Banner (2); Order of Kutuzov, 2nd class; Order of the Red Star

Fyodor Alexeyevich Bakunin (Russian: Фёдор Алексеевич Бакунин; 2 March 1898 – 22 January 1984) was a Soviet Army major general. Bakunin briefly served in the Imperial Russian Army in 1917 and in 1919 joined the Red Army, fighting in the Russian Civil War. He became an officer and in 1938 was appointed to lead the 11th Rifle Division. A year later Bakunin became commander of the 2nd Rifle Corps. Nearly a year later, he became commander of the 61st Rifle Corps. The corps fought in the Battle of Smolensk after the German invasion of the Soviet Union. Bakunin led the corps during the Siege of Mogilev, in which it was destroyed. He escaped the encirclement and became a teacher at the Frunze Military Academy. In the fall of 1943 he was given deputy command of the 10th Rifle Corps and in May 1944 command of the 63rd Rifle Corps. Bakunin led the corps until 1947, when he retired.

== Early life and career ==
Bakunin was born on 2 March 1898 in the village of Staroye Ilmovo in Kazan Governorate, the son of a worker. He worked as a coal miner before being drafted into Imperial Russian Army as a private in February 1917. Sent to the Semyonovsky Life Guard Regiment, Bakunin became an unter-ofitser and participated in the February and October Revolutions before being demobilized in October. In April 1918 he joined the Red Guards and in December 1919 the Red Army. He became a platoon commander in the Tomsk Red Guard unit in April 1918. In August, Bakunin became a battalion commander in the partisan detachment led by V.P. Shevelev. Bakunin fought on the Eastern Front against the White Army led by Alexander Kolchak in the Kuznetsky District, Marinsk, and Kemerovo. In December 1919 Bakunin entered the 2nd Siberian Infantry Courses at Tomsk. After graduating, in July 1921 he became a platoon commander at the 25th Infantry School of the Siberian Military District.

== Interwar ==
From September 1922 Bakunin studied at the Higher Military School in Omsk. In November 1923, he became a company commander in the 34th Rifle Regiment of the 12th Rifle Division in the Siberian Military District. Bakunin later became chief of the regimental school. Between 1926 and 1930 he studied at the Vystrel officer improvement courses. In December 1930, he became assistant commander of the 52nd Rifle Regiment of the 18th Rifle Division in the Moscow Military District. In 1931, he studied at special courses for combat training management. In 1932, Bakunin was appointed regimental commander. In March 1938, Bakunin became commander of the 11th Rifle Division of the Leningrad Military District at Kingisepp. On 16 March, he was promoted to Kombrig. In February 1939, he took command of the 2nd Rifle Corps at Velikiye Luki. In January 1940, Bakunin became commander of the 61st Rifle Corps of the Moscow Military District in Tula. On 4 June 1940, he was promoted to Major general.

== World War II ==
Bakunin led the corps in the Siege of Mogilev, part of the Battle of Smolensk. On 13 July, Bakunin became commander of the Soviet troops in Mogilev after rest of the 13th Army withdrew. The city was encircled by the German advance. On 21 July, Bakunin reported that his shells had been expended and requested more ammunition. Disobeying orders from superiors not to retreat, he ordered a breakout for the night of 26 to 27 July as a result of severe ammunition shortages. Western Front commander Semyon Timoshenko reported on 27 July that Bakunin had been turned over to a military tribunal for his ordering the breakout. Bakunin led 140 others in the escape out of the encirclement. After reaching Soviet lines, he was at the disposal of the Western Front and the Main Personnel Directorate of the People's Commissariat for Defence. In late December Bakunin became a senior lecturer in tactics at the Frunze Military Academy and was then the head of a course.

In November 1943, Bakunin became deputy commander of the 10th Rifle Corps in the 51st Army. On 12 May 1944 he was awarded the Order of the Red Banner for his actions. On 20 May 1944 he was appointed commander of the 63rd Rifle Corps, fighting in Operation Bagration and the Baltic Offensive. For his leadership Bakunin was awarded the Order of Kutuzov 2nd class.

== Postwar ==
After the war, Bakunin continued to command the 63rd Rifle Corps until 26 July 1947. The corps had been relocated to the Ural Military District. He retired in August 1947 and lived in Krasnodar, where he died on 22 January 1984.
