= 172nd Rifle Division =

- Red Army insignia
- Active: 1st formation: September 1939–July 1941; 2nd formation: October 1941–June 1942; 3rd formation: September 1942–1946
- Country: Soviet Union
- Branch: Red Army
- Type: Infantry
- Engagements: German-Soviet War 1st formation: Siege of Mogilev; 2nd formation: Siege of Sevastopol; 3rd formation: Prague Offensive
- Decorations: Order of the Red Banner (3rd formation); Order of Suvorov 2nd class (3rd formation)
- Battle honours: Pavlograd (3rd formation)

Commanders
- Notable commanders: Yakov Kreizer (1st formation); Mikhail Romanov (1st formation)

The 172nd Rifle Division (Russian: 172-я стрелковая дивизия) was an infantry division of the Red Army during World War II, formed thrice.

== First formation ==
On 22 June 1941 it was part of the 61st Rifle Corps of the 20th Army in the Reserve of the Supreme High Command. By 10 July the division transferred to the 13th Army of the Western Front with the corps. It was officially disbanded on 19 September.

== Second formation ==
It was formed on 10 October 1941 from the 3rd Crimean Motorized Division as part of the 51st Army. By 1 November it transferred to the Coastal Army. It was officially disbanded on 25 June 1942.

== Third formation ==
The division was reformed again on 9 September in the area of the Dorokhovo railway station, part of the Moscow Defense Zone, under the command of Lieutenant Colonel Alexander Kostitsyn. The latter transferred to command the 183rd Rifle Division on 30 September.

At the end of the war, it was part of the 102nd Rifle Corps of the 13th Army.

In mid-1945 it was withdrawn to Korosten in the Carpathian Military District with the army's 27th Rifle Corps. The division was disbanded in 1946.

== Commanders ==
The division's first formation was commanded by the following officers:

- Major General Mikhail Romanov (14 March–19 July 1941)

The division's second formation was commanded by the following officer:

- Colonel Ivan Laskin (6 March–25 June 1942)

The division's third formation was commanded by the following officers:

- Lieutenant Colonel Alexander Kostitsyn (14–30 September 1942)
- Colonel Gavriil Sorokin (31 September 1941–22 January 1943)
- Colonel Nikolay Timofeyev (23 January 1943–1 January 1944; promoted to major general 18 May 1943)
- Colonel Nikita Korkishko (2 January–7 May 1944)
- Major General Anatoly Krasnov (8 May 1944–after 11 May 1945)

== Sources ==
- Affairs Directorate of the Ministry of Defense of the Soviet Union (1967). Сборник приказов РВСР, РВС СССР, НКО и Указов Президиума Верховного Совета СССР о награждении орденами СССР частей, соединениий и учреждений ВС СССР. Часть I. 1920–1944 гг [Collection of orders of the RVSR, RVS USSR and NKO on awarding orders to units, formations and establishments of the Armed Forces of the USSR. Part I. 1920–1944] (PDF) (in Russian). Moscow. Archived from the original (PDF) on 2019-03-27.
- Feskov, V.I.; Golikov, V.I.; Kalashnikov, K.A.; Slugin, S.A. (2013). Вооруженные силы СССР после Второй Мировой войны: от Красной Армии к Советской [The Armed Forces of the USSR after World War II: From the Red Army to the Soviet: Part 1 Land Forces] (in Russian). Tomsk: Scientific and Technical Literature Publishing. ISBN 9785895035306.
- Grylev, A. N. (1970). "Перечень № 5. I. Стрелковые и горнострелковые дивизии" [List (Perechen) No. 5 Part I. Rifle and Mountain Rifle Divisions] (in Russian). Moscow: Voenizdat. Archived from the original on 2 September 2017.
- Gurkin, V.V.; Malanin, K.A. (1963). Боевой состав Советской армии: Часть I (июнь-декабрь 1941 года) [Combat Composition of the Soviet Army, Part I (June–December 1941)] (PDF) (in Russian). Moscow: Military Historical Department of the Military Scientific Directorate of the General Staff.
- Main Personnel Directorate of the Ministry of Defense of the Soviet Union (1964). Командование корпусного и дивизионного звена советских вооруженных сил периода Великой Отечественной войны 1941 – 1945 гг [Commanders of Corps and Divisions in the Great Patriotic War, 1941–1945] (in Russian). Moscow: Frunze Military Academy.
- Sharp, Charles C. (1995). The Soviet Order of Battle World War II: An Organizational History of the Major Combat Units of the Soviet Army. Vol. 8: "Red Legions", Soviet Rifle Divisions Formed Before June 1941. West Chester, Ohio: George F. Nafziger. OCLC 258366685.
- Sharp, Charles C. (1996). The Soviet Order of Battle World War II: An Organizational History of the Major Combat Units of the Soviet Army. Vol. 10: "Red Swarm", Soviet Rifle Divisions Formed From 1942 to 1945. West Chester, Ohio: George F. Nafziger. OCLC 39214254.
- Shkadov, Ivan, ed. (1987). Герои Советского Союза: краткий биографический словарь [Heroes of the Soviet Union: A Brief Biographical Dictionary] (in Russian). Vol. 1. Moscow: Voenizdat.
- Tsapayev, D.A.; et al. (2014a). Goremykin, V.P. (ed.). Великая Отечественная: Комдивы. Военный биографический словарь [The Great Patriotic War: Division Commanders. Military Biographical Dictionary] (in Russian). Vol. 3. Moscow: Kuchkovo Pole. ISBN 978-5-9950-0382-3.
- Tsapayev, D. A.; et al. (2014b). Великая Отечественная: Комдивы. Военный биографический словарь [The Great Patriotic War: Division Commanders. Military Biographical Dictionary] (in Russian). Vol. 5. Moscow: Kuchkovo Pole. ISBN 978-5-9950-0457-8.
- Tsapayev, D. A.; et al. (2015). Великая Отечественная: Комдивы. Военный биографический словарь [The Great Patriotic War: Division Commanders. Military Biographical Dictionary] (in Russian). Vol. 4. Moscow: Kuchkovo Pole. ISBN 978-5-9950-0602-2.
