= Kuznetsky (rural locality) =

Kuznetsky (Russian: Кузне́цкий; masculine), Kuznetskaya (Кузне́цкая; feminine), or Kuznetskoye (Кузне́цкое; neuter) is the name of several rural localities in Russia:

- Kuznetsky, Kudeyarovsky Selsoviet, Lukoyanovsky District, Nizhny Novgorod Oblast, a settlement in Kudeyarovsky Selsoviet of Lukoyanovsky District of Nizhny Novgorod Oblast
- Kuznetsky, imeni Stepana Razina Work Settlement, Lukoyanovsky District, Nizhny Novgorod Oblast, a settlement under the administrative jurisdiction of the work settlement of imeni Stepana Razina, Lukoyanovsky District, Nizhny Novgorod Oblast
- Kuznetsky, Novosibirsk Oblast, a settlement in Chulymsky District of Novosibirsk Oblast
- Kuznetskoye, Chelyabinsk Oblast, a selo in Kuznetsky Selsoviet of Argayashsky District of Chelyabinsk Oblast
- Kuznetskoye, Kaliningrad Oblast, a settlement in Pereslavsky Rural Okrug of Zelenogradsky District of Kaliningrad Oblast
- Kuznetskoye, Tver Oblast, a village in Sandovsky District of Tver Oblast
