= Kuznetsky District =

Kuznetsky District is the name of several administrative and municipal districts in Russia.

== Districts of the federal subjects ==
Location of Penza Oblast in Russia

- Kuznetsky District, Penza Oblast, an administrative and municipal district of Penza Oblast

== City divisions ==
- Kuznetsky City District, a city district of Novokuznetsk, a city in Kemerovo Oblast
Location of Novokuznetsk in Russia

== See also ==
- Kuznetsky (disambiguation)
