= Andrey Nikitin (footballer, born 1980) =

Russian footballer

Andrei Nikitin
Personal information
- Full name: Andrei Mikhailovich Nikitin
- Date of birth: 24 March 1980 (age 46)
- Place of birth: Moscow, Russian SFSR
- Height: 1.83 m (6 ft 0 in)
- Position: Defender

Youth career
- FC Torpedo-ZIL Moscow

Senior career*
Years	Team	Apps	(Gls)
1997–2003	FC Torpedo-Metallurg Moscow	14	(0)
2003–2005	FC Fakel Voronezh	65	(3)
2006–2007	FC Lukhovitsy	61	(4)
2008	FC Metallurg Lipetsk	25	(2)
2009	FC Salyut-Energia Belgorod	1	(0)
2010	FC Fakel Voronezh	13	(0)
2011–2012	FC Spartak Tambov	16	(1)
- * Club domestic league appearances and goals

Andrei Mikhailovich Nikitin (Russian: Андрей Михайлович Никитин; born 24 March 1980) is a former Russian professional footballer.

== Club career ==
He made his debut in the Russian Premier League in 2002 for FC Torpedo-ZIL Moscow.
