= 55th Mixed Aviation Division =

- Active: 1941–1942
- Country: Soviet Union
- Branch: Soviet Air Forces
- Type: Aviation division
- Engagements: World War II

The 55th Mixed Aviation Division was an Aviation Division of the Soviet Air Forces during World War II.

== History ==
The division was formed on 25 February 1941 in the Leningrad Military District.

It formed part of the 'operational army' from 22 June 1941 until its disbandment on 7 March 1942.

On 22 June 1941 the division headquarters was in Petrozavodsk. The formation of the division was not completed, and it consisted of only the 72nd High-Speed Bomber Aviation Regiment, which was composed of 34 serviceable Tupolev SB fast medium bombers. On 27 June 1941, the division was reinforced by 33 I-16s of the 155th Fighter Aviation Regiment. It operated from the beginning of the war in the area of Lake Ladoga and Byelomorsk. On 25 July 1941, the division made a raid on Finland, losing one flight of nine planes, one of them knocked her. In general, the division launched strikes against ground forces of the enemy and provided air support to Soviet troops.

At the end of August 1941 the division included 88 serviceable and 15 defective aircraft.

== Units ==
- 72nd Bomber Aviation Regiment (22.06.1941 – 07.03.1942)
- 65th Assault Aviation Regiment ( July 1941 – October 1941) (Assault Aviation Regiment)
- 31st High-Speed Bomber Aviation Regiment (probably from September – 6 December 1941)
- 155th Fighter Aviation Regiment (27.06.1941 – 23.11.1941)
- 197th Fighter Aviation Regiment (24.07.1941 – October 1941)
- 427th Fighter Aviation Regiment (from 29.10.1941)
- 524th Fighter Aviation Regiment (from 13.10.1941)
- 119th Separate Reconnaissance Aviation Squadron
- 2nd GVF Detachment (2-й авиационный гидроотряд гражданского воздушного флота)

== Subordination ==
Date	Front (Military District)	Army	Corps	Notes
22.06.1941	Northern Front	7th Army	-	-
01.07.1941	Northern Front	-	-	-
10.07.1941	Northern Front	7th Army	-	-
01.08.1941	Northern Front	7th Army	-	-
01.09.1941	Karelian Front	-	-	-
01.10.1941	-	7th Separate Army	-	-
01.11.1941	-	7th Separate Army	-	-
01.12.1941	-	7th Separate Army	-	-
01.01.1942	-	7th Separate Army	-	-
01.02.1942	-	7th Separate Army	-	-
01.03.1942	-	7th Separate Army	-	-

== Commanders ==
- Colonel Alexander Bogorodetsky (?-18 July 1941)
- Colonel Vasily Filin (18.07.1941-07.03.1942)
