= Pyotr Filatov =

Soviet lieutenant general (1893–1941)

Pyotr Mikhailovich Filatov
- Filatov between 1938 and 1940
- Born: 18 August 1893; Rzhev, Tver Governorate, Russian Empire
- Died: 14 July 1941 (aged 47) Moscow, Soviet Union
- Buried: Novodevichy Cemetery
- Allegiance: Russian Empire; Russian SFSR; Soviet Union
- Branch: Imperial Russian Army; Red Army
- Service years: 1914–1917; 1918–1941
- Rank: Lieutenant general
- Commands: 17th Rifle Division; 26th Rifle Division; 27th Rifle Division; 15th Rifle Corps; 13th Army
- Conflicts: World War I; Russian Civil War; Polish–Soviet War; World War II
- Awards: Order of the Red Banner (2); Order of the Patriotic War, 1st class; Order of the Red Star

Pyotr Mikhailovich Filatov (Russian: Пётр Михайлович Филатов; 18 August 1893 – 14 July 1941) was a Red Army lieutenant general. A veteran of World War I, Filatov rose to brigade command during the Russian Civil War and was decorated for his actions. He held division command in the 1920s and 1930s between military education and served as a corps commander and deputy commander of an army and a front in the late 1930s. Shortly before the beginning of Operation Barbarossa in June 1941, he became commander of the 13th Army in Belarus, which suffered heavy losses in the opening weeks of the war. He was mortally wounded in an air raid on 8 July and died a week later.

== Early life, World War I, and Russian Civil War ==
Born on 18 August 1893 in Rzhev to Russian parents considered bourgeois, Filatov served in the Imperial Russian Army from 1914. He fought in World War I on the Western Front as a ryadovoy, then was promoted to junior unter-ofitser. After graduating from the Dusheti School of Ensigns as a praporshchik, Filatov served as an assistant course commander, junior officer, and company commander. He ended his service in the Imperial Army as a podporuchik.

After joining the Red Army in 1918 during the Russian Civil War, Filatov fought against Polish troops on the Western Front and against anti-Soviet forces in Belarus as a platoon commander, an officer for drill parts of a rifle regiment, as assistant commander of the 145th Rifle Regiment of the 17th Rifle Division. He became commander of the 147th Rifle Regiment of the division and from July 1920 commanded the division's 51st Rifle Brigade, distinguishing himself in the Polish–Soviet War. In recognition of his performance, Filatov was awarded the Order of the Red Banner twice, in 1920 and 1921.

== Interwar period ==
In 1922, Filatov graduated from Higher Academic Courses at the Red Army Military Academy. He served as commander of the 50th Rifle Regiment, assistant commander, acting commander, and again as assistant commander of the 17th Rifle Division during this period. After taking command of the 26th Rifle Division in November 1925, Filatov became chief of the Vladivostok Infantry School in February 1927, then studied at the special faculty of the Frunze Military Academy. He graduated from Higher Commanders' Improvement Courses at the academy in 1928 and from the academy itself in 1936. Filatov became a member of the Communist Party in 1930. Made a kombrig when the Red Army introduced personal military ranks in 1935, he commanded the 27th Rifle Division of the Belorussian Military District between 1936 and 1937.

Advancing to command of the 15th Rifle Corps of the Kiev Military District in June 1937, he was promoted to komdiv on 17 February 1938 and to komkor on 14 June 1938. Transferred to the Far East during June 1938 to serve as deputy commander of the Special Red Banner Far Eastern Army (OKDVA), Filatov continued in that position for the 1st Separate Red Banner Army when the OKDVA was split in September of that year. He received the Order of the Red Star during the year for successful management of combat training, and became a lieutenant general when the Red Army introduced general officer ranks on 4 June 1940. After another reorganization, he became deputy commander of the forces of the new Far Eastern Front in June 1940. A few weeks before the beginning of Operation Barbarossa, on 26 May 1941, Filatov was appointed commander of the new 13th Army of the Western Special Military District in Belarus, then a headquarters without assigned troops.

== World War II ==
After Operation Barbarossa began on 22 June, the army was assigned troops. Filatov led the army in the Battle of Białystok–Minsk as it suffered heavy losses attempting to halt the German advance. After the encirclement of Minsk, Filatov led the army east to defend the line of Borisov, Smolevichi, and the Ptich. He was severely wounded in a German air raid on 8 July in the area of Mogilev. Evacuated to Moscow, he died of his wounds on 14 July and was buried in the Novodevichy Cemetery. He was posthumously awarded the Order of the Patriotic War, 1st class, together with other generals killed in 1941 in commemoration of the 20th anniversary of the end of the war in 1965.

== Awards and honors ==
Filatov received the following awards and decorations:

- Order of the Red Banner (1920, 1921)
- Order of the Patriotic War, 1st class (1965)
- Order of the Red Star (1938)
- Jubilee Medal "XX Years of the Workers' and Peasants' Red Army" (1938)
