= 110th Rifle Division =

- Active: I Formation: 1939–1941 II Formation: 1941–1943 III Formation: 1943–1946
- Country: Soviet Union
- Branch: Red Army
- Type: Infantry
- Size: Division
- Engagements: World War II: Battle of Smolensk (1941); Operation Mars; Battles of Rzhev; Operation Kutuzov; Battle of Smolensk (1943); Operation Bagration; East Prussian Offensive; Battle of Königsberg
- Battle honours: Verkhnedneprovsk (3rd formation)

Commanders
- Notable commanders: Col. Vasilii Andreevich Khlebtsev; Col. Nikolai Aleksandrovich Bezzubov; Maj. Gen. Georgii Borisovich Peters; Col. Sergei Konstantinovich Artemev; Col. Vasilii Andreevich Guzhavin; Col. Sergei Mikhailovich Tarasov

The 110th Rifle Division was a formation of the Soviet Union's Red Army during the course of World War II, which was formed, dissolved, and re-formed three times throughout the war.

== History ==
=== First formation ===
The division was first formed 20 September 1939 at Sverdlovsk in the Urals Military District. Its primary order of battle included:

- 394th, 411th, 425th Rifle Regiments
- 355th Light Artillery Regiment
- 457th Antiaircraft Battalion

Mobilized before the beginning of Operation Barbarossa, by June 1941 the division formed part of the 61st Rifle Corps in the 20th Army, in the Reserve of the Supreme High Command (Stavka Reserve) around Moscow, the 20th Army occupying a defensive position around Kaluga. The division was destroyed with its corps during the Siege of Mogilev in July 1941. The division was officially disbanded on 19 September 1941.

=== Second formation ===
On 4 September 1941, the 4th Moscow People's Militia Rifle Division, which had originally been raised in the Kuibyshev district of Moscow in July 1941, was renumbered as the new 110th Rifle Division, beginning its second formation.

Its composition changed to regular army subunits to include:

- 1287th, 1289th, 1291st Rifle Regiments
- 971st Artillery Regiment
- 695th Antiaircraft Battalion
- 470th Reconnaissance Company
- 859th Signal Battalion
- 493rd Medical/Sanitation Battalion
- 332nd Chemical Defence Company
- 329th Auto-transport Company

It was assigned as part of the 24th, 49th, 21st, and 33rd Armies, participating in the defensive and offensive operations around Moscow – Operation Mars at the end of 1942 as part of the Red Army's Kalinin Front, and later in 1943 the Rzhev-Vyazma offensives, and the Orel offensive operation (Operation Kutuzov), after the Battle of Kursk. From the Rzhev battles to October 1944, the division was commanded by Major General Georgy Borisovich Peters, its former deputy commander.

On 10 April 1943, the 110th Rifle Division was renamed the 84th Guards Rifle Division.

=== Third formation ===
The third formation of the division was on 5 May 1943, with the same unit numbers as the second formation. On 6 April 1945, commanded by Colonel Sergey Mikhailovich Tarasov, it participated in the encirclement of Königsberg, located at the northern sector. In that assault, the division was accompanied by its two sister divisions of 69th Rifle Corps, 50th Army: the 153rd Rifle Division, on its right flank, and the 324th Rifle Division on its left flank.

The division moved to the Kharkov Military District in Luhansk Oblast postwar and was disbanded with the corps on or around 6 May 1946.

== See also ==
- List of infantry divisions of the Soviet Union 1917–1957

== Sources ==
- Feskov, V.I.; Golikov, V.I.; Kalashnikov, K.A.; Slugin, S.A. (2013). Вооруженные силы СССР после Второй Мировой войны: от Красной Армии к Советской [The Armed Forces of the USSR after World War II: From the Red Army to the Soviet: Part 1 Land Forces] (in Russian). Tomsk: Scientific and Technical Literature Publishing. ISBN 9785895035306.
- Glantz, David M., Stumbling Colossus: The Red Army of the eve of World War. University Press of Kansas, Lawrence, Kansas, 1998. ISBN 0-7006-0879-6
- Generals.dk General Major Georgii Borisovich Peters (1897–1978) was the deputy commander and later commanding officer of 110th Rifle Division in 1942-44, including after its renaming as the 84th Guards Koracheyev Rifle Division.
- Bonn, Keith E., Slaughterhouse: The Handbook of the Eastern Front, Aberjona Press, Bedford PA, 2005
- Grylev, A., Gen. Maj., Perecheni No.5 of the General Staff: Rifle, mountain, motor-rifle and motorised divisions included in the active army during the years of the Great Patriotic War 1941-1945, Military-scientific directorate of the General Staff, Moscow, 1970, via www.soldat.ru, Perechen, verified 4 June 2008.
- Main Personnel Directorate of the Ministry of Defense of the Soviet Union (1964). Командование корпусного и дивизионного звена советских вооруженных сил периода Великой Отечественной войны 1941–1945 гг [Commanders of Corps and Divisions in the Great Patriotic War, 1941–1945] (in Russian). Moscow: Frunze Military Academy. pp. 152-53
