= 38th Tank Division =

- 38-я танковая дивизия
- Active: March 1941 - August 1941
- Country: Union of Soviet Socialist Republics
- Branch: Army
- Type: Heavy-Mechanized
- Garrison/HQ: Byelorussian Military District
- Engagements: World War II

The 38th Tank Division was a military formation of the Red Army during World War II.

== History ==
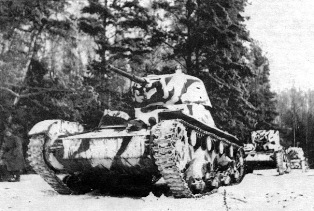
A T-26 tank.

The division began forming in March 1941 in Barysaw on the basis of the 20th Light Tank Brigade as part of the 20th Mechanized Corps. By 22 June 1941, it was stationed in the military camp at Novo-Borisov, on the western bank of the Berezina. At the start of the war, the division was seriously understrength in equipment, its howitzer regiment possessed only three artillery units, while its two tank regiments had only 43 T-26 light tanks. The division's personnel strength was approximately 3,000 men.

The division served in the active army from 22 June to 1 August 1941.

On 24 June 1941, the division advanced toward the Logoysk area, where it entered combat, including engagements with elements of the 17th Panzer Division. It soon began retreating southeast from Minsk through Svyslach.

On 9 July 1941, the defenses of the 20th Mechanized Corps were broken through, and the division was withdrawn to the rear with the rest of the corps. After receiving replacements, the division had 3,422 personnel as of 12 July 1941, but no tanks or armored vehicles remained.

On 1 August 1941, the 38th Tank Division was officially disbanded.

== Commanders ==
Kapustin Sergei Ivanovich (March 11, 1941 – August 1, 1941, captured in September 1941).
