= 13th Army (Soviet Union) =

- 13-я армия
- Active: 1939–1940; 1941–1993
- Country: Soviet Union; Ukraine
- Branch: Soviet Army; Ukrainian Army
- Type: Combined arms
- Size: Field army
- Engagements: Russo-Finnish War; World War II

The 13th Army (Russian: 13-я армия, romanized: 13-ya armiya, Ukrainian: 13-та армія, romanized: 13-ta armiya) was a name given to several field armies of the Soviet Union's Red Army. Later armies existed until the 1990s, and the army survived as part of the Ukrainian Ground Forces for some years.

== Russo-Finnish War ==
The 13th Army was created again at the end of December 1939 as a separate 13th Army in the course of the Soviet advance into the Karelian Isthmus when the 7th Army was split into two, and also renamed separate, after being substantially reinforced. As part of the 1940 February Vyborg offensive, they were coordinated by the North Western Front in Leningrad, both armies were able to breach either the first or second defensive positions in the Mannerheim Line, but were unable to breach the main position. The separate 13th Army was allocated three of the eight rifle corps assigned to the operation.

=== Commanders ===
- Vladimir Grendal (25 December 1939 – March 1940)
- Filipp Parusinov (March 1940 – April 1940).

== World War II ==
The 13th Army (1st formation) headquarters was formed in May 1941 in the Western Special Military District, starting on 5 May in Mogilev in accordance with the decision of Central Committee of the Communist Party and Sovnarkom of the USSR No.1113-460cc. dated 23 April 1941. It was intended to comprised 21st, 2nd, and 44th Rifle Corps. In the beginning of June Lieutenant General Pyotr Filatov arrived to take command. From the beginning of Operation Barbarossa, the Army included the 21st Rifle Corps, 50th Rifle Division, the 8th Anti-Tank Artillery Brigade and a number of other separate units. From the end of June 1941 the Army conducted defensive operations in the Minsk Fortified Region, on the Borisov direction and on the Dnieper river. The formation conducted operations as part of the Soviet Western Front and the Soviet Central Front. Parts of the Army held up the Wehrmacht advance for almost three weeks near Mogilyev. The 172nd Rifle Division under Major General Mikhail Romanov especially distinguished itself in the combat. Parts of the Army participated in the Battle of Smolensk from 10 July to 10 September 1941. During September and October 1941, the Army was operating as part of the Bryansk Front and included the 6th Rifle Division.

The Army fought as part of the Central Front in the Battle of Kursk in July 1943 under General N.P. Pukhov, numbering four corps with twelve rifle divisions (including the 75th Guards Rifle Division). The Army finished its war service in Germany within the 1st Ukrainian Front in 1945, consisting of the 24th Rifle Corps (117th Guards Rifle Division, 280th Rifle Division, 395th Rifle Division), 27th Rifle Corps (6th Guards Rifle Division and 121st Guards Rifle Division), 102nd Rifle Corps (147th Rifle Division and 172nd Rifle Division, which took part in the Battle of Halbe), 17th Artillery Division, and many other smaller artillery and other formations.

=== Commanders ===
- Lieutenant General Pyotr Filatov (25.05 - 8.07.1941)
- Lieutenant General Fyodor Remezov (9-13.07.1941)
- Lieutenant General Vasyl Herasymenko (14-26.07.1941)
- Major General Konstantin Golubev (26.07 - 30.08.1941)
- Major General Avksenty Gorodnyansky (31.08.1941 - 2.01.1942)
- Major General Nikolai Pukhov (3.01.1942 - 3.06.1946), from 14 February 1943 Lieutenant General, from 26 August 1944 Colonel-General
- Colonel General Mikhail Shumilov (4.06.1946 – 18.02.1947)
- Colonel General Issa Pliyev (19.02.1947 – 19.04.1948)
- Colonel General Ivan Lyudnikov (20.04.1948 – 2.12.1949)
- Lieutenant General Alexander Nechaev (3.12.1949 – 8.01.1953)
- Lieutenant General Nikolay Oleshev (9.01.1953 – 5.04.1954)
- Lieutenant General Gleb Baklanov (6.04.1954 – 23.02.1959)

== Soviet Army ==
The Army was located for the entire postwar period in the Lviv and Carpathian Military Districts, initially comprising three Rifle Corps with a total of nine rifle divisions. From 1947 to 1949 it was commanded by General Issa Pliyev who was a renowned commander of several Cavalry mechanized groups during the war. It was for much of this period headquartered at Rovno. Almost all its divisions were Guards formations: the 17th, 51st, 97th (the former 40th, 15th, and 97th Rifle Divisions). Only the 24th (subsequently resubordinated to Military District control) and the 161st Rifle Division were not Guards, but both were renowned combat formations.

In 1960 the following divisions were assigned:

- 15th Guards Motor Rifle Division (Vladimir-Volynskiy, Volynskaya Oblast) (former 51 Guards Rifle Division
- 24th Motor Rifle Division (Yavorov, Lvov Oblast)
- 97th Guards Motor Rifle Division (Slavuta, Khmelnitskiy Oblast)(former 97 Guards Rifle Division)
- 99th Motor Rifle Division (Izyaslav, Khmelnitskiy Oblast)

In 1960 the 24th Motor Rifle Division was transferred to district control. In January 1965 the 99th Motor Rifle Division was redesignated the 161st Motor Rifle Division.

On 22 February 1968 the army was awarded the Order of the Red Banner.

In 1970 the following divisions were assigned:

- 51st Guards Motor Rifle Division (Vladimir-Volynskiy, Volynskaya Oblast)
- 97th Guards Motor Rifle Division (Slavuta, Khmelnitskiy Oblast)
- 161st Motor Rifle Division (Izyaslav, Khmelnitskiy Oblast)

In 1970 the 275th Motor Rifle Division (mobilisation) was activated, and the 62nd Anti-Aircraft Rocket Brigade was transferred from the 8th Tank Army.

In 1980 the following divisions were assigned:

- 51st Guards Motor Rifle Division (Vladimir-Volynskiy, Volynskaya Oblast)
- 97th Guards Motor Rifle Division (Slavuta, Khmelnitskiy Oblast)
- 161st Motor Rifle Division (Izyaslav, Khmelnitskiy Oblast)
- 275th Motor Rifle Division (mobilisation) (Izyaslav, Khmelnitskiy Oblast)

In 1987 the 275th Motor Rifle Division (mobilisation) was disbanded.

Divisions in 1988:

- 51st Guards Motor Rifle Division (Vladimir-Volynskiy, Volynskaya Oblast)
- 97th Guards Motor Rifle Division (Slavuta, Khmelnitskiy Oblast)
- 161st Motor Rifle Division (Izyaslav, Khmelnitskiy Oblast)

Also part of the army in the late 1980s were the 119th Independent Helicopter Regiment at Brody (Mi-8, Mi-24), the 442nd Independent Helicopter Regiment at Zhovtnevoye (Mi-24s), 62nd Anti-Aircraft Rocket Brigade (Lyuboml), 49th Independent Engineer Regiment, and 38th Rocket Brigade (Kremenets). In January 1992, the army, its facilities and most of the equipment was transferred to the newly-sovereign Ukraine.

== Ukrainian Army ==
On 18 March 1992, in accordance with Decree No. 161 of the President of Ukraine, Major General Petro Shulyak was assigned as the army commander.

Formation in 1989	Formation in 1991–92 (Ukraine)
17th Guards Motor Rifle Division (Khmelnitskiy)	Unchanged(?)
51st Guards Motor Rifle Division (Vladimir-Volynsky)	No change
97th Guards Motor Rifle Division (Slavuta)	97th Guards Mechanised Brigade
161st Motor Rifle Division (Izyaslav)	161st Mechanised Brigade

Oleksandr Zatynaiko later became commander. On 27 December 1993, the 13th Army was redesignated as the 13th Army Corps.

== See also ==
- Battle of Kursk order of battle
