= 138th Rifle Division =

138th Rifle Division (September 1939 - March 14, 1941) 138th Mountain Rifle Division (March 14, 1941 - April 8, 1942) 138th Rifle Division (April 8, 1942 - February 7, 1943) 138th Rifle Division (May 1943 - July 1945)
- Active: 1939–1945
- Country: Soviet Union
- Branch: Red Army
- Type: Infantry
- Size: Division
- Engagements: Winter War; Battle of the Kerch Peninsula; Operation Blue; Battle of Stalingrad; Operation Uranus; Operation Ring; Belgorod-Kharkov Offensive Operation; Battle of the Dniepr; Kirovograd Offensive; Korsun-Shevchenkovsky Offensive; Lvov–Sandomierz Offensive; Western Carpathian Offensive; Moravia–Ostrava Offensive
- Decorations: Order of the Red Banner (1st and 2nd Formations); Order of Suvorov (2nd Formation); Order of Bogdan Khmelnitsky (2nd Formation)
- Battle honours: Carpathian (2nd Formation)

Commanders
- Notable commanders: Kombrig Aleksandr Ivanovich Pastrevich; Kombrig Aleksandr Aleksandrovich Khadeev; Maj. Gen. Yakov Andreevich Ishchenko; Col. Pavel Maksimovich Yagunov; Col. Mikhail Yakovlevich Pimenov; Maj. Gen. Ivan Ilich Lyudnikov; Col. Ivan Stepanovich Prutkov; Col. Viktor Ivanovich Rutko; Col. Vasilii Efimovich Vasilev

The 138th Rifle Division was twice formed as an infantry division of the Red Army, first as part of the buildup of forces immediately after the start of World War II in Europe. The first formation was based on the shtat (table of organization and equipment) of September 13, 1939 and under this organization it took part in the Winter War against Finland, arriving at the front north of Leningrad in December and performing so capably in the battles in early 1940 that it was awarded the Order of the Red Banner. Following this it was converted to serve for two years as a mountain rifle division in the Caucasus region. Following Operation Barbarossa and the German invasion of the Crimea elements of the division were committed to amphibious landings behind enemy lines in early 1942 but these proved abortive. Soon after the 138th was converted back to a standard rifle division. Arriving on the southern approaches to Stalingrad in late July the division fought in this area through August and into September before it was assigned to 62nd Army and shipped into the factory district in mid-October. Well into November it played a leading role in defending the Barricades (Barrikady) ordnance factory, eventually becoming isolated in a thin strip of land between the factory and the Volga which became known as "Lyudnikov's Island" after its commanding officer. Following the Soviet counteroffensive that encircled the German 6th Army and other Axis forces in and near Stalingrad the division restored contact with the rest of its Army and then helped eliminate its trapped foes, for which it was raised to Guards status as the 70th Guards Rifle Division.

A new 138th was raised in May 1943 under the "shtat" of December 10, 1942, based on two rifle brigades, one of which was naval infantry from the Leningrad area and one of which was from central Asia. It first saw action in the advance through eastern Ukraine following the Battle of Kursk, and took part in the battle for the Korsun–Cherkassy Pocket. Later in 1944 it drove into the western Ukraine, eventually into the foothills of the Carpathian Mountains, and from the autumn of that year until the spring of 1945 advanced through the difficult terrain of Slovakia, winning its own Order of the Red Banner in the process and ending the war in eastern Moravia. This formation of the division was disbanded shortly after the fighting ended.

== 1st Formation ==
The division was originally based on a regimental cadre (301st Rifle Regiment) from the 48th Rifle Division and began forming in September 1939, with the following order of battle:

- 554th Rifle Regiment
- 650th Rifle Regiment
- 768th Rifle Regiment
- 295th Light Artillery Regiment
- 198th Antitank Battalion
- 203rd Signal Battalion
- 155th Reconnaissance Battalion
- 179th Sapper Battalion
- 436th Tank Battalion
- 135th Medical/Sanitation Battalion

The division was under the command of Kombrig Aleksandr Ivanovich Pastrevich, but he was replaced in December by Kombrig Aleksandr Aleksandrovich Khadeev.

By December the 138th was already engaged in the Soviet-Finnish Winter War. Fighting as a separate rifle division, part of 7th Army on the Karelian Isthmus, the 138th took part in the renewed offensive that began with concentrated artillery bombardments on February 1, 1940. Concentrated on a 16km front that stretched from Summa to the Lähde road to the Munasuo Swamp, nine rifle divisions backed by five tank brigades attacked on February 11 and by the 15th the Finnish forces were withdrawn to the intermediate line. This line was reached by advance forces of 7th Army late on the 16th but was not strong enough to delay the Soviet advance for more than a few days. When the fighting was over, the division had collectively won the Order of the Red Banner, and three officers were awarded the Gold Star of Heroes of the Soviet Union.

=== Conversion to Mountain Division ===
Between March 14 and April 15, 1941, the division was converted to a mountain rifle division with a specialized order of battle featuring four rifle regiments made up of oversized companies (no battalion structure), with supporting arms, capable of independent operations in difficult terrain and backed by light and mobile mountain artillery:

- 344th Mountain Rifle Regiment (newly formed)
- 554th Mountain Rifle Regiment (from 554th Rifle Regiment, until March 1, 1942)
- 650th Mountain Rifle Regiment (from 650th Rifle Regiment)
- 768th Mountain Rifle Regiment (from 768th Rifle Regiment)
- 295th Artillery Regiment (from 295th Light Artillery Regiment)
- 536th Howitzer Regiment (added to division following the Winter War)
- 284th Antitank Battery
- 76th Antiaircraft Battery (later 326th Antiaircraft Battalion)
- 292nd Mortar Battalion
- 155th Cavalry Reconnaissance Squadron (from 155th Reconnaissance Battalion)
- 179th Sapper Battalion (as previous)
- 203rd Signal Battalion (as previous)
- 41st Machine Gun Battalion (later 82nd Machine Gun Battalion)
- 135th Medical/Sanitation Battalion (as previous)
- 214th Chemical Defense (Anti-gas) Company
- 408th Motor Transport Company (newly formed)
- 115th Field Bakery
- 269th Divisional Veterinary Hospital
- 223rd Remount Detachment
- 464th Field Postal Station
- 51st Field Office of the State Bank

Kombrig Yakov Andreevich Ishchenko had been in command of the division through most of 1940 and had his rank modernized to major general on June 4. At the outbreak of war with Germany on June 22, 1941, the 138th was near Leninakan in the 23rd Rifle Corps of Transcaucasian Military District, and became part of 45th Army in July. General Ishchenko gave up his command on September 22 and was replaced three days later by Col. Pavel Maksimovich Yagunov; Ishchenko would remain in staff positions for the duration of the war.

=== Crimean Operations ===
In October the division was shifted to 46th Army, and added the 82nd Machine-gun Battalion to its order of battle on the 10th. On December 25 it went into the 'active army' in the 47th Army of Crimean Front. Overnight on December 28/29 elements of the 44th Army staged a successful amphibious landing at the German-held port of Feodosiya on the Kerch Peninsula. While the operation soon secured the port, by January 1, 1942 the Soviet lodgement of three rifle divisions with about 23,000 men had been contained by the German XXXXII Army Corps about 18km to the west. Meanwhile, the commander of German 11th Army, Gen. of Inf. E. von Manstein, made preparations to eliminate the Soviet bridgehead.

Meanwhile, the commander of Crimean Front, Lt. Gen. D. T. Koslov, was making preparations to divert Manstein's reserves. A further landing by 218 men of the 226th Mountain Rifle Regiment (63rd Mountain Rifle Division) was made on the night of January 5/6 near Sudak, about 40km southwest of Feodosiya. As a diversion this was unsuccessful as Manstein's counterattack on Feodosiya began at dawn on January 15 but in the face of this Kozlov chose to send the rest of the 226th Regiment to Sudak. By January 20 the Soviet forces at Feodosiya had been forced back to the Parpach Narrows and both sides dug in while German and Romanian troops were dispatched to deal with the situation at Sudak. In "an arrant display of stupidity" Koslov decided to reinforce failure and on the night of January 24/25 Maj. S. I. Zabrodotsky's 554th Mountain Rifle Regiment was landed there, followed by an additional 1,300 troops the next night. Despite this the commander of XXX Army Corps reported on January 28 that the Sudak bridgehead had been eliminated. About 2,000 Red Army troops were killed, nearly half of whom had been taken prisoner before being executed, a few hundred were evacuated by sea and most of the remainder disappeared into the mountains, with perhaps 350-500 joining partisan groups.

The balance of the division fought under 51st Army in February and March, suffering heavy losses until being pulled back into reserve near Kerch. On March 24 Colonel Yagunov was replaced in command by Col. Mikhail Yakovlevich Pimenov. The division began reforming on March 30, and on April 8 it was once again officially the 138th Rifle Division. Its remaining mountain rifle regiments became standard rifle regiments and the 292nd Mortar Battalion was added. One month later, German 11th Army began Operation Trappenjagd into the eastern end of the peninsula. The 138th escaped relatively intact from the Kerch Naval Base, evacuating to Krasnodar on the night of May 19/20.

== Battle of Stalingrad ==
On May 16 the division came under the command of Col. Ivan Ilich Lyudnikov, who had been in command of the 200th Rifle Division at the time of the German invasion. After recovering from severe wounds he had led several divisions in the Caucasus region, including the 63rd Mountain. In late June the German forces launched Operation Blue, aiming for, among other objectives, the city of Stalingrad. As forces of Southern Front moved north to Stalingrad Front's positions along the middle Don River in mid-July the STAVKA ordered North Caucasus Front to reinforce its positions east of Rostov-na-Donu with the 138th and the 115th Cavalry Division from 51st Army. On July 31 the 4th Panzer Army began an advance on the Abganerovo axis. This struck the 138th and 157th Rifle Divisions, tearing apart their defenses east of the Don and forcing them to withdraw in considerable disorder toward Kotelnikovo.

=== Fighting on the Approaches ===
Late on August 2 the commander of 64th Army, Maj. Gen. M. S. Shumilov, created the Southern Operational Group under command of his deputy, Lt. Gen. V. I. Chuikov. The next day Shumilov ordered the 138th and 157th to reinforce this Group, which was to defend the line of the Aksai River. By nightfall on August 4 Chuikov's Group had proven incapable of maintaining a coherent defense over a front of 60km with divisions that had from 1,500 - 4,500 men each (the 138th had 4,200 on strength), with a total of about 40 tanks and 300 guns and mortars in support. Unless something was done, German forces could advance on Stalingrad virtually unimpeded. In response, in order to improve command and control, the STAVKA split Stalingrad Front and created Southeastern Front effective August 7 and 51st Army, with the 138th, was subordinated to the latter, although the division remained part of Group Chuikov. It was currently holding its defense along the Aksai, at Gorodskii and Novoaksaysky.

As these command rearrangements were being made the 14th Panzer Division resumed its advance on August 5 and during the day thrust 30-40km north from Aksai, bypassing Group Chuikov's weak left flank and reaching Abganerovo Station, 70km southwest of Stalingrad. Despite this perilous position Chuikov's Group managed to halt the left wing of 4th Panzer Army along the lower Aksai for 12 days. This forced the Panzer Army to divide its forces instead of concentrating for a decisive advance on the city. On August 5 the Romanian VI Army Corps managed to force a bridgehead at the junction between the 138th and 157th divisions but this was thrown back with a dawn counterattack the next day. On August 13 General Shumilov, concerned that Group Chuikov could be encircled, ordered a phased withdrawal to the Myshkova River. By this time the division had been formally subordinated to 64th Army as the 51st fell back east toward the Volga.

4th Panzer Army resumed its advance on August 20 with its XXXXVIII Panzer Corps, which fielded 180-200 tanks. 64th Army was deployed across a front of 120km, with the sector of the lower Myshkova defended by three rifle divisions backed by the 138th and 29th Rifle Divisions and 154th Naval Rifle Brigade in second echelon with the 13th Tank Corps concentrated southeast of Tinguta Station. The assault soon drove back the first echelon and a battlegroup of 14th Panzer, reinforced by part of 29th Motorized Division, advanced 4km and captured Tinguta. In response Shumilov withdrew the 138th and the 154th Brigade to reserve positions 5km to the rear. On August 22 the XXXXVIII Panzer Corps redeployed and in heavy fighting reached the southern and eastern approaches to the Station, forcing the 138th and 204th Divisions into all-around defenses to protect it. The German assault was renewed over the next two days but at the end of August 24 the 64th Army reported:

138th RD occupied a defense along the line of the railroad hut 5 kilometres southwest of 74 km Station – [Defensive line] "K" (4 kilometres northeast of 74 km Station).

While this attack was fought to a standstill, on August 29 the XXXXVIII Panzer Corps found a weak spot and overwhelmed the 126th Rifle Division north of Abganerovo Station, advancing 20km during the day, forcing the 138th to abandon its positions at Tinguta. The divisional command post of the 126th had been overrun, many staff officers killed, and the divisional commander captured; by the end of the day the division had been reduced to only 1,054 combat troops.

The collapse of the 126th also unhinged the defenses of the 29th and 138th divisions along the rail line, forcing them to withdraw northward and opening a path to the rear areas of 64th and 62nd Armies. The commander of Southeastern Front, Col. Gen. A. I. Yeryomenko, ordered Shumilov to withdraw to new defenses from Novy Rogachik southeastward along the Chervlennaia River to Ivanovka, 25km southwest of Stalingrad. Overnight on August 30/31 the 138th was withdrawn to the Army's reserve and was noted the next day as having no more than 1,000 "bayonets" (infantry and sappers) on strength. By the end of September 2 it was situated in the second echelon defenses along the Peschanka Balka (ravine).

4th Panzer Army renewed its offensive on September 8. The 29th Motorized and a battlegroup of 14th Panzer wheeled south and struck the extreme right wing of 64th Army southeast of Voroponovo Station. The assault pressed the 204th and 126th Divisions and the reinforcing 138th Division and 133rd Tank Brigade back to new defenses extending southwest from Peschanka. The Army reported, "As a result of the enemy tank attack, [138th Rifle Division's] 343rd Rifle Regiment was almost completely destroyed," although "18 enemy tanks were destroyed and burned." The following day the German forces drove southward west of Kuporosnoe, forcing the 138th, 204th and 157th Divisions to abandon Staro-Dubovka. The Soviet forces withdrew to the new defense line east and west of Gornaia Poliana, which was already manned by the 126th Division. During the day the remainder of 14th Panzer reinforced the assault of the 29th Motorized and while this was halted short of Kuporosnoe and the west bank of the Volga, the four rifle divisions were being rapidly eroded away.

Overnight on September 9/10 a battalion of the 29th Motorized reached the Volga south of Kuporosnoe but was thrown back in part by the 131st Rifle Division after it had been relieved at Gornaia Poliana. The 138th and 126th Divisions were now supported by the fresh 56th Tank Brigade and a regiment from the Krasnodar Infantry School, containing the 14th Panzer. On September 12 the fighting for the Stalingrad suburbs reached its climax. 14th Panzer was now supported by the mixed German/Romanian IV Army Corps and probed the defenses of the 64th Army from the southwest outskirts of Kuporosnoe around to its boundary with 57th Army at Ivanovka. This position would become known as the Beketovka bridgehead. At this time the division was noted as having a total of 2,123 personnel. Lyudnikov's chief of staff was Lt. Col. V. I. Shuba and his political officer was N. I. Titov.

=== Beketovka Bridgehead ===
In the last days of September a task group of 57th Army carried out a successful counterstroke against the positions of 1st Romanian Infantry Division at Lake Tsatsa and the 14th Panzer had to be sent to stabilize the front. This was followed overnight on October 1/2 by an attack by five divisions, including the 138th, of the 64th Army against the positions of the 371st Infantry Division at and west of Peschanka in an attempt to capture that place and Staro-Dubovka. The commander of the 422nd Rifle Division, Col. I. K. Morozov, wrote:

Day and night, the divisions of 64th Army fought their way to the north to link up with 62nd Army, but the distance between the armies scarcely diminished.

Although the attack failed, it was an unpleasant distraction for Gen. F. Paulus whose 6th Army was now deeply involved in the fighting in the city. On October 5 the 138th arrived in the reserve of Stalingrad Front for refitting. Over the next 8-10 days its manpower was raised to 2,646 although it was short of rifles and machine guns (on hand 1,025 rifles, 224 submachine guns, 6 light and 12 heavy machine guns, 27 antitank rifles) and numbers of these had to be taken from the other regiments to fully arm the 650th. However it was strong in artillery with 11 122mm howitzers, 31 76mm cannons and 21 antitank guns.

=== Into the City ===
By late on October 14 the Dzerzhinskiy Tractor Factory had fallen to forces of German 6th Army and Chuikov, now in command of 62nd Army, recognized that the city's defense now had to be anchored on the Barrikady munitions factory and the Krasny Oktyabr steel plant. Yeryomenko promised to release the 138th, which was partially rested and replenished, the next day.

On the night of October 15/16 the 138th began crossing the Volga into Stalingrad, coming under Chuikov's orders again as part of 62nd Army, to take up positions at the Barrikady:

1. The enemy has taken the Stalingrad Tractor Plant, is developing an attack from the STP to the south along the railway line in an attempt to seize Barrikady.

2. 62 Army continues to hold its positions, beating off fierce enemy attacks.

3. 138th Red Banner RD from 04.00 hours 17.10.42 to occupy and stubbornly defend the line: south of the suburb Derevensk, Sculpturnyi. Under no circumstances to allow enemy to approach Leninskii Prospekt and Barrikady factory.

650th Rifle Regiment/Major Pechenyuk: 138th Division/to take up positions in Barrikady, establish ring of fire-points and not to permit enemy penetration into the factory.

The crossing, under heavy German fire, was carried out by the 44th Brigade of the Volga Flotilla. The leading 650th Regiment was dispatched to reinforce the sagging defenses of the 95th Rifle Division's 161st and 241st Rifle Regiments east of the Stadium, moving into well-prepared positions supported by roughly 20 tanks of the 84th Tank Brigade.

The German Group Jänecke, consisting of the 305th Infantry and 14th Panzer Divisions, supported by elements of 24th Panzer, had begun a new assault on the Soviet positions north and west of the Barrikady on October 16. Up to 40 German tanks attacked Soviet positions along Leninskii Prospekt and Tramvainaia Street at 1300 hours and pushed into the northern part of the Barrikady by the end of the day. The 650th was thrown in immediately to hold a new line south of Tramvainaia to the northern end of Volkhovstroevsk Street. The 344th and 768th Regiments began their crossings at 0500 hours on October 17 and on arrival fanned out to protect the remainder of the factory and the strip of land between it and the Volga. The former took up positions in the central manufacturing halls and the latter deployed along Leninskii Prospekt northeast of the factory, tying in with the 95th Division. With suitable positions at a premium Colonel Lyudnikov had to squeeze his command post into damaged bunkers already occupied by 62nd Army headquarters personnel.

Overnight Group Jänecke regrouped with the intention of expelling the 138th from the Barrikady and then encircling the entire 308th Rifle Division and the 685th Regiment of the 193rd Rifle Division in the workers' settlement west of it. This plan was compromised by serious weaknesses in the attacking forces, especially in tanks and assault guns. On the morning of October 17 the tanks and infantry of 14th Panzer made rapid progress after smashing through the boundary between the 650th and 768th Regiments, forcing both to retreat deeper into the northern and western parts of the Barrikady. By noon the 344th was caught up in the melee and as the day ended all three regiments had fallen back to new defenses, exposing the right wing of the 308th. In consequence this division suffered heavy casualties and its survivors fell back to the 138th's positions. While the division had prevented the German forces from taking the factory in one bound, the first full day of its defense had been a defeat and Chuikov was forced to shift his headquarters south to the Krasny Oktyabr. However 14th Panzer had lost 19 of its original 33 tanks destroyed or knocked out during the day.

During the night the German LI Army Corps regrouped again to complete the capture of the Barrikady, including its remaining halls and the Bread Factory one block south. The assault group of the previous day was reinforced with 18 StuG III assault guns of the 244th and 245th Battalions. Supporting forces of the 24th Panzer, 389th Infantry and 100th Jäger Divisions would also be involved, leading to an overly complex plan for the day's attack. This quickly degenerated into a costly slugfest that continued over several days with only limited German gains. Lyudnikov ordered his 344th Regiment to contest every one of the factory's ruined halls and other buildings. The 305th Infantry and the grenadiers of 14th Panzer were forced into the tedious and costly process of rooting out Soviet infantrymen and sappers from every room and shop and as they slowly approached the Volga became more exposed to artillery fire from the east bank. During the day the 24th Panzer and a regiment of the 389th Infantry finally secured the Brick Factory north of the Barrikady from the remnants of 37th Guards Rifle Division supported by the 650th Regiment, while a separate push against the 650th to reach the Volga did so only along a very narrow sector and at heavy cost.

A relative lull in operations followed from October 19-22 due in part to diminishing German strength and in part to intermittent heavy rains and occasional snow showers which did not clear until early on the 21st. During this time the 138th organized and strengthened its defenses and launched strong local counterattacks while Paulus called up the 79th Infantry Division. An attack planned by LI Corps for the morning of October 19 against all three regiments of the division came to an abrupt and bloody halt; the German regiments could each muster no more than a battalion with about 10 tanks or assault guns in support. The battlegroups of the 305th Infantry's 576th and 578th Regiments attacked the 768th Regiment at dawn, splashing through flooded shell craters, climbing over heaps of debris and gaining some ground but also coming under flanking small arms fire from the 2nd Battalion of the 344th to the south as well as direct and indirect fire from the 295th Artillery Regiment. Without air support, due to the weather, the commander of the 576th Regiment reported that "the cleansing of Hall 6 (the Manufacturing Hall) and Hall 4 (the Assembly Hall) was going to be a bloody and protracted affair." After this effort was suspended Lyudnikov ordered the 344th, supported by survivors of the 308th Division, to counterattack into the southwest corner of the factory to reach the boundary with the 193rd Division. This took the German forces by surprise and regained some ground.

The LI Corps planned for a renewed offensive on the two factories to begin on October 23. For the Barrikady the 14th Panzer and 79th Infantry were to attack from its southwest corner southward to Karuselnaya Street to capture the Bread Factory and the Krasny Oktyabr. Meanwhile, the 305th Infantry and a squadron of six tanks of 24th Panzer were to conduct a secondary attack to clear the Barrikady and west bank of the Volga to its north and northeast. By this time all nine battalions of the 305th were combat rated as "weak" and the 24th Panzer had only 15 operational tanks. At the same time the 84th Brigade had only a "handful" of tanks remaining; the 138th, with the remnants of the 308th and the 37th Guards, counted fewer than 2,500 men.

Assault groups of the 305th Infantry launched a series of night attacks at 0100 hours on October 23 against the positions of the 650th Rifle Regiment among the gullies and ravines northeast of the factory. These night attacks from German forces were unexpected, but also unsuccessful. The main attack began at 0810, preceded by air and artillery bombardments. The assault of the 578th Regiment, with the six tanks of the 24th Panzer, struck the railroad yards and severely damaged halls in the southern half of the Barrikady that were defended by two weak battalions of the 308th, later reinforced by a battalion of the 650th. The other battlegroups of the 305th, attacking the northern part of the factory, advanced only about 100 metres in the face of resistance from the 344th and 768th Regiments. Hall 4 was retaken by a counterattack and the commander of the 305th advised Paulus during a visit to the front lines that his division was no longer capable of offensive operations. During the day's fighting the 138th received 258 replacements.

The next day the two sides, both reduced to little more than weak battalion and company groups, continued a desperate struggle among the ruined shops, halls and warehouses, with gains and losses measured in tens of metres. Initial German attacks seized part of Hall 6b but faltered as the 768th Regiment was reinforced by elements of the other two regiments. However, a renewed effort at 1630 hours captured Hall 4 and most of Hall 6. On the morning of October 25 nearly all of the southern and central factory buildings were in German hands; at this point the 768th was deployed in the north and the 650th in the south of the division's sector with the 344th in between, still holding a corner of Hall 6. Given the march-companies and replacements Yeryomenko continued to ferry across the river the division likely still had about 2,500 men on strength, whereas the 305th Infantry had been weakened to less than 1,200 infantry. Its further attacks during the day made minor gains leaving the 138th holding just the northeastern part of the factory grounds. Chuikov recorded that the "backbone" of his 308th, 193rd, 138th and 37th Guards Divisions had "lost... combat effectiveness" and "only soldiers who arrived as recent reinforcements remain in the divisions."

During October 26 and 27 the fighting in the factory district focused on the ferry landing stage between the Barrikady and the Krasny Oktyabr where the reinforcing 45th Rifle Division was scheduled to arrive. On the second day the left flank of the 650th Regiment and a regiment of the 308th Division were overrun by German sub-machine gunners which occupied Mezenskaya and Tuvinskaya Streets, reaching within 400m of the Volga although later thrown back somewhat. At about the same time, in a move that would soon prove crucial to the 138th, units of the 14th Panzer and 305th Infantry reached the Barrikady's fuel storage tank farm. The fighting in this area continued during the next two days without further German gains, but during this period the remainder of the 305th finally cleared the factory's eastern edge and the 138th fell back into the maze of buildings and streets between the factory and the Volga.

=== Lyudnikov's Island ===
The arrival of the 6,500 men of the 45th Division tipped the battle for the factory district in 62nd Army's favor and fighting died down over the last days of the month. Between November 1-10 there was another operational lull but fierce fighting continued on a limited scale, including more unsuccessful German efforts to take the ferry stage with armor support. New attacks on November 2–3 by the 305th Infantry, now reinforced with more assault guns and panzerjägers, faltered immediately against the 650th and 768th Regiments. Fighting largely ceased on November 4 as both sides prepared for an expected final effort by 6th Army to clear the city before winter set in. Raids and small actions by both sides continued until November 10. The front-line positions of the 138th (and attached 118th Guards Rifle Regiment) were as follows:

[T]he bank of the Volga River in the center of Derevensk, the railroad crossing on Pribaltiiskaia Street, the southeastern part of Volkhovstroevsk; the northeastern part of the Barrikady Factory, and Pribaltiisk.

When the 305th and 389th Infantry Divisions completed their preparations on that date they had been reinforced with five combat engineer battalions from outside the city, each numbering about 450 men which, combined with their own remaining infantry and engineers, gave the divisions a total of about 5,200 men, outnumbering the Soviet troops they faced by more than two to one.

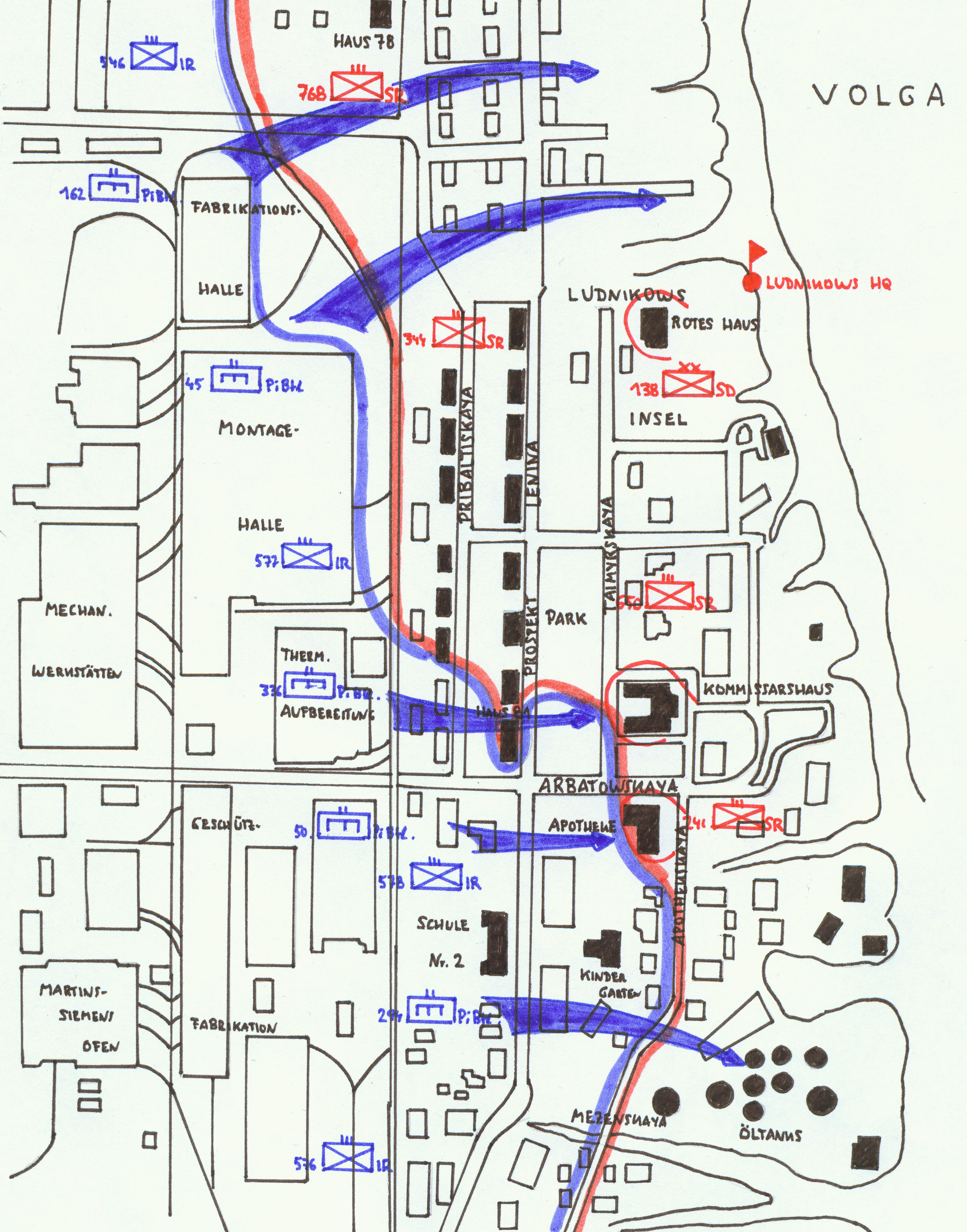
Attack on the "Pharmacy" and the "Commissar's House"

This final bid began with an artillery preparation at 0340 hours on November 11 against the 138th and 95th Divisions east of the Barrikady. Early on the attackers penetrated the 241st Regiment of the 95th and reached the Volga on a 200m front east of Mezenskaya. At the same time the 138th was struck by three infantry regiments, two engineer battalions plus 16 assault guns, weighted to its right (north) flank northeast of the factory, but managed to initially hold its positions. The 578th Infantry Regiment, led by the 50th Engineer Battalion and ten assault guns, plowed slowly toward two key objectives designated as the "Pharmacy" and the "Commissar's House", both about 400m from the river; the latter contained Lyudnikov's headquarters. Finding a gap between the 241st and 650th Regiments a German assault group seized the ruins around the Pharmacy, but when the 50th Engineers approached the Commissar's House they found all its entrances blocked with rubble. Unable to deploy satchel charges against it they fell back to nearby shell holes where they were pinned down by heavy fire.

Meanwhile, the 576th Infantry Regiment and 294th Engineer Battalion were making continuous progress against the 241st Regiment and ultimately captured the fuel tank farm. This effectively cut the 138th off from the remainder of 62nd Army. Further attempts to advance from the ravine east of the Pharmacy towards House No. 79 were stymied by flanking fire from the Commissar's House. The 344th Regiment stopped the 577th Regiment immediately east of the factory but a regiment of the 389th Infantry Division, led by two engineer battalions and a mix of assault guns and panzerjägers, threw the 768th Regiment out of its last toehold in the factory and back to within 200m of the river. The last seven men of the 118th Guards Regiment were forced to fight their way south to Lyudnikov's now-isolated bridgehead by the day's end. German infantry casualties had been moderate but armor losses had been high. Lyudnikov reported that his 768th was down to 24 men and condemned the withdrawal of the 241st Regiment "without advance warning" that left his division pocketed, a pocket that LI Corps was confident could be eliminated the next day.

In the event Paulus ordered a halt for November 12. The two German divisions dug in and reorganized as Chuikov demanded attacks to restore contact with the 138th. As part of this effort the composite regiment (685th, about 200 men) of the 193rd Division was subordinated to Lyudnikov at 1800 hours. During November 12-22 the attacks of the 193rd plus elements of the 95th Division retook part of the fuel tank farm but failed to reestablish contact with the division. At 0345 hours on November 13 the LI Corps renewed its assaults on the 138th. Lyudnikov ordered his roughly 2,000 men:

... to mobilize every resource and to fulfill the mission at all costs. Not a step back! Strengthen observation and steadfastly repulse all attacks by the enemy.

The early attack caught the 650th Regiment off guard and reached the walls of the Commissar's House (the "П-shaped building" in Soviet accounts). The 50th Engineers, now equipped with ladders, were able to enter through upper-floor windows and drove the defenders into fortified cellars where they were attacked with smoke grenades, satchel charges and gasoline. These defenders were mostly mortar-men of the 650th and repeatedly called in artillery fire on their positions during the late afternoon; only ten of these, most of whom were wounded or burned, were able to escape. The 578th Infantry gained another block north of the Commissar's House, considerably reducing the bridgehead which now measured about 700m in width and 400m in depth. Lyudnikov had by now moved his headquarters to a ravine on the Volga bank just east of the building that the German forces called the Red House.

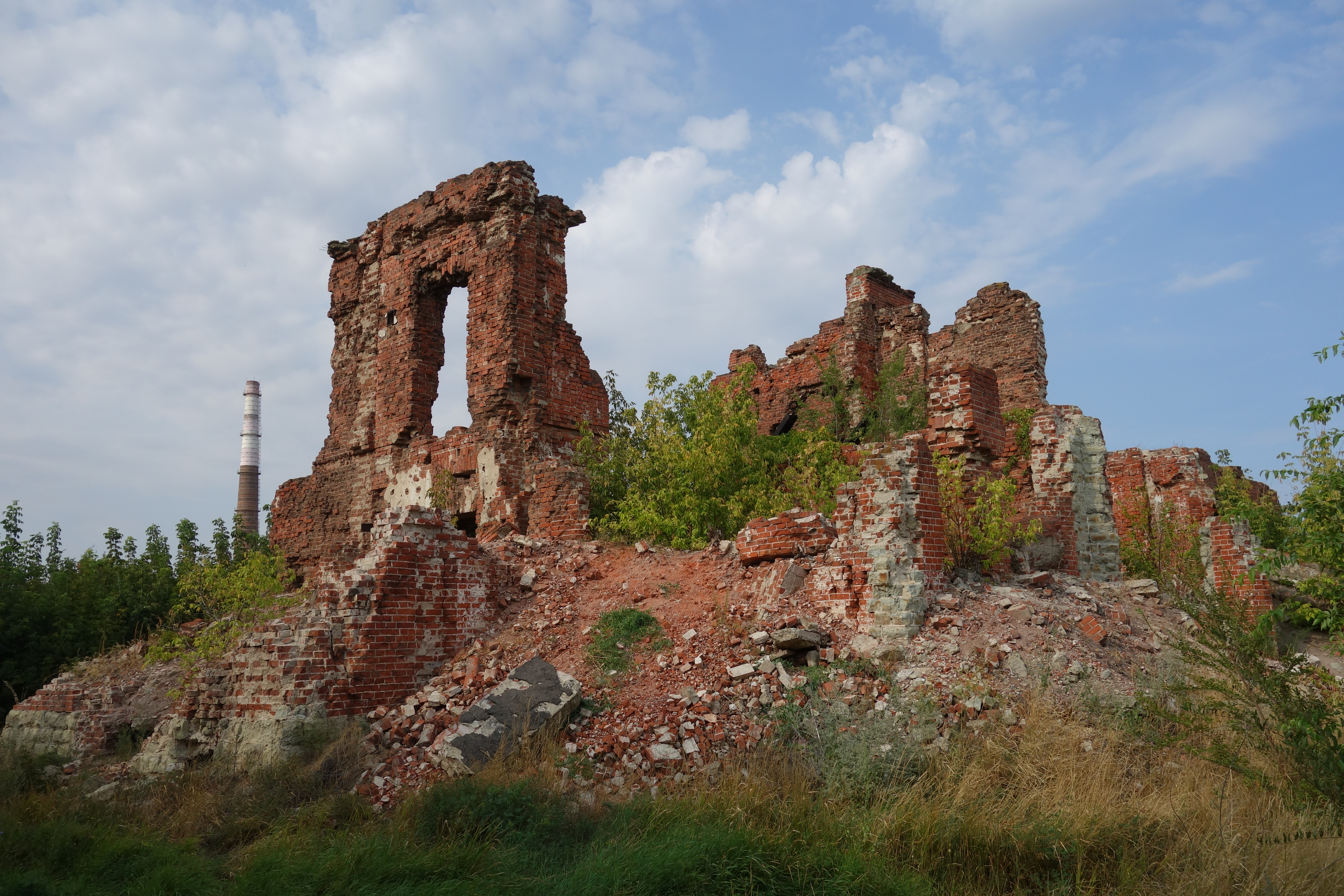
Modern-day ruins of the "Red House"

With no strength left to conduct major attacks elsewhere in the factory district, on November 14 the LI Corps again sought to liquidate "Lyudnikov's Island". The right flank of the 344th Regiment was struck by the 577th Infantry, spearheaded by two companies of the 336th Engineers and supported by as many as 23 assault guns. House No. 74, defended by the 650th Regiment, was also targeted; in all slightly more than 3,000 German troops attacked less than half this number manning hundreds of strongpoints scattered through the rubble. Despite hard fighting and heavy losses German gains were limited and two buildings lost by the 344th Regiment were later regained in counterattacks. The division's supply situation was becoming critical; captured weapons and ammunition were in extensive use and drops from Po-2 aircraft frequently fell into German hands. By day's end the 138th had roughly 500 "bayonets" still in the fight. After yet another regrouping the German attack continued the next day against its right and left flanks, focused on individual buildings, and meeting repeated counterattacks. At nightfall Lyudnikov's staff reported that the 768th was no longer combat-effective, the 650th numbered 31 men, and the 344th had 123, including its command cadre. Overall the division had 20-30 rounds per rifle, no grenades or sub-machine gun ammo, no food, and about 250 wounded were at the division's command post. Overnight four bales of provisions and four of ammunition were airdropped, but again some of these fell within German lines.

From November 16-18 Paulus ordered another pause in the battle, in preparation for a new attack on November 20. During this period the 578th Infantry and its attached and much weakened engineers advanced less than a block on the left flank of the 650th Regiment along the Volga. Meanwhile, the river was rapidly icing-up, blocking supply traffic to 62nd Army from the east bank. On November 17 Hitler sent a new order to 6th Army stating that the ice presented an opportunity to reach the river, specifically in the Barrikady and Krasny Oktyabr sectors. The next day a carefully planned attack beginning at 0400 hours captured House No. 77 from the 650th Regiment and a further effort in the afternoon gained about 100m along the riverbank. The division was still very short of supplies and with no means to recharge radio batteries could no longer call in artillery support. But this marked the last gasp for the LI Corps' offensive. As of November 20 the 138th had a personnel strength of 1,673 remaining, although most of these were in the artillery and support services on the east bank.

=== Siege of 6th Army ===
Further air drops on November 19 had delivered 10,000 rounds of rifle cartridges and several boxes of food to the "Island" where the remaining 250 active "bayonets" fended off several attacks without losing ground. On the same day Operation Uranus began as Southwestern and Don Fronts attacked German and Romanian positions northwest of Stalingrad. The Axis crisis deepened the next day when Stalingrad Front went over to the offensive southwest of the city. 62nd Army's role was to continue to defend and to launch local attacks to tie down German forces. The 138th was struck again on November 21, repelled four battalion-sized attacks supported by seven assault guns and had about 180 of its men wounded through the day but also received supplies from several ships which also evacuated most of the casualties. The attacks persisted the next day with similar results and replacements kept the division at a strength of about 300 infantry. Maj. Gen. F. E. Bokov of the Red Army General Staff complained that Chuikov was failing to support the division and demanded that more ice cutters and icebreakers be brought in to ensure supplies. The encirclement of the Axis forces was completed the same day.

Following the encirclement the Soviet armies encountered tough resistance from the German forces within what was rapidly becoming a fortress. 62nd Army's skeletal divisions attacked on November 28-29 but made minimal gains before going over to the defense the next day. The 95th Division continued to try to break through from the south to the 138th, without success. The 305th Infantry was in little better shape, reporting on December 2 that it had about 1,000 men in its front lines mostly facing roughly 600 of the 138th. Apart from minor positional sparring the fighting in the city was minimal until December 16 when the Volga finally froze solid, which soon allowed vehicular supply traffic to 62nd Army. Contact with "Lyudnikov's Island" was firmly reestablished on the 23rd. The 138th had attacked at 0500 hours on the 21st, capturing four houses, five machine guns and two prisoners while advancing 100m-120m to the south while the 95th Division drove northwest making similar gains. Fighting continued on December 22 and the two divisions linked up on a 50m-wide sector along the river which was widened the next day.

The two sides faced each other within the city for the next several weeks as the German relief attempt, Operation Winter Storm, played out. 62nd Army was now under command of Don Front and prepared for Operation Ring, the final offensive against 6th Army; at this time the 138th had 800-900 active "bayonets" in the city which was above average. At 0200 hours on January 10, 1943 Chuikov ordered his 156th Fortified Region to relieve the division in the "Island" with its 400th Machine Gun–Artillery Battalion. This move permitted the division to shift south into a sector just east of the Krasny Oktyabr between the 39th Guards and 45th Rifle Divisions in preparation for an assault west toward Znamenskaya Street. This attack by the three divisions on January 12 did not achieve any decisive results but LI Corps reported 23 killed and 85 wounded during the day although this did not include any tally from the 305th Infantry. Progress increased on January 14 when the combined Soviet force gained up to ten blocks deep into the lower Krasny Oktyabr village, pressing toward Hill 107.5 which dominated the area. By the 20th the 138th and the 39th Guards, now joined by the 13th Guards Rifle Division, were close enough to the Hill to send reconnaissance teams toward its eastern slopes.

At 0100 hours on January 22 Chuikov issued his Order No. 24 directing his divisions to finally seize the objectives he had assigned a week earlier but they were now facing increasing numbers of German refugees from the fighting outside the city and made little progress. On January 27 Colonel Lyudnikov was promoted to the rank of major general. Two days later the 138th, 45th and 95th Divisions were ordered to finish the fighting for the Barrikady and the Bread Factory as well as a portion of the Barrikady village but were unable to prise the remnants of the half-starved German troops from their bastions there as the rest of the Front's armies closed in from the west. The last men of LI Corps, two days later than the rest of 6th Army, laid down their arms on February 2 and four days later, while being moved to the Reserve of the Supreme High Command, the 138th Rifle Division became the 70th Guards Rifle Division.

== 2nd Formation ==
A new 138th Rifle Division began forming at Kalinin in the Moscow Military District in May 1943 from the 6th Naval Infantry Brigade and the 109th Rifle Brigade, under 52nd Army in the Reserve of the Supreme High Command. At this point in the war, the Red Army was generally amalgamating separate rifle brigades into rifle divisions, which were more efficient on the battlefield.

=== 6th Naval Infantry Brigade ===
The first brigade with this designation was formed at Novorossiysk in August 1941 but was soon disbanded. A second brigade completed forming on September 15 at Kronstadt by the Red Banner Baltic Fleet with five battalions and went to the front with 4,980 officers and men under command including 2,368 Communist Party or Komsomol members. It was immediately moved to the lines south of Leningrad, joining the 42nd Army. Until April 1942 the brigade shifted among the armies defending Leningrad and then was moved across Lake Ladoga to join the 54th Army of Volkhov Front, remaining there for the next year defending in the swampy forests north of Novgorod, some of the worst terrain on the front. In the spring of 1943 it was organized as follows:

- 1st, 2nd, 3rd Infantry Battalions
- Mortar Battalion (50mm and 82mm mortars)
- Artillery Battalion (76.2mm cannon)
- Antitank Battery
- Reconnaissance Company
- Medical/Sanitation Company
- Motor Transport Company

=== 109th Rifle Brigade ===
The first brigade of this designation was formed from December 1941 to April 1942 in the Moscow Military District and finally arrived at the front in June as part of 13th Army in Bryansk Front. It remained under these commands until November when it was broken up to provide replacements for other units. A second 109th started forming almost immediately in the Central Asia Military District and remained there until May 1943 when it was railed west to join the Reserve of the Supreme High Command and was soon disbanded to provide much of the manpower and equipment for the new 138th Rifle Division.

Col. Moisei Yakovlevich Katkov was assigned as commander on May 20 but was replaced on June 19 by Col. Ivan Stepanovich Prutkov. Once formed the division had the following order of battle:

- 344th Rifle Regiment
- 650th Rifle Regiment
- 768th Rifle Regiment
- 295th (briefly 296th) Artillery Regiment
- 284th Antitank Battalion
- 230th Reconnaissance Company
- 179th Sapper Battalion
- 203rd Signal Battalion (later 117th Signal Company)
- 135th Medical/Sanitation Battalion
- 214th Chemical Defense (Anti-gas) Company
- 408th Motor Transport Company
- 425th Field Bakery
- 269th Divisional Veterinary Hospital
- 1102nd Field Postal Station
- 1273rd (later 1785th) Field Office of the State Bank

The division remained in Reserve until August when 52nd Army was assigned to Voronezh Front during the Belgorod-Kharkov Offensive Operation; at this time it was assigned to the 78th Rifle Corps. On September 9 Col. Viktor Ivanovich Rutko took over command from Colonel Prutkov. As 52nd Army approached the Dniepr on September 20 the division was recorded as having 4,514 personnel on strength, supported by 73 82mm and 18 120mm mortars, 46 regimental guns, 20 76.2mm divisional cannon and 12 122mm howitzers. By the end of the month 52nd Army had reached the Dniepr, and its 254th Rifle Division soon forced a crossing in the Kreshchatik area. During October the Army was moved to Steppe Front, which became 2nd Ukrainian Front on October 20.

Before the end of the month the division was moved to Front reserves, then in November to 4th Guards Army in the same Front, where it joined the 5th Guards Airborne Division in 20th Guards Rifle Corps. During December it was again reassigned, now to 21st Guards Rifle Corps, which also contained the 69th Guards Rifle Division. While 4th Guards Army was largely on the defense during this period, joint advances by 2nd and 3rd Ukrainian Fronts in the Dniepr bend during November and December had allowed the Army to substantially expand its bridgehead between Kremenchug and Cherkassy. As early as November 20 the 1st Panzer Army reported that its infantry strength had fallen to the lowest tolerable level and Cherkassy was threatened with encirclement. The fighting through the first three weeks of December was largely attritional in nature but around the middle of the month the German line north of Krivoi Rog gave way and soon 2nd Ukrainian Front had cleared the west bank of the Dniepr north to Cherkassy.

=== Korsun–Cherkassy Pocket ===
The Kirovograd Offensive began on January 5 and involved four armies, although the 4th Guards was in a secondary role, and the city was liberated three days later. The advance to the northwest continued until January 16 by which time the German XI and XXXXII Army Corps, holding the last sector of the Dniepr line, were deeply enveloped. On January 25 the 4th Guards Army, which was still rebuilding in strength, plunged into the front of the German 8th Army southwest of Cherkassy and was helping set the stage for a classic double envelopment in conjunction with two mobile corps of 6th Tank Army attacking from the north. On the afternoon of January 28 the encirclement was closed in conjunction with forces of 1st Ukrainian Front, 56,000 German troops were trapped, and the 138th helped form the inner ring of the encircling forces. The fighting for the Korsun Pocket continued until February 17 by which time about 30,000 German troops had managed to escape, roughly half of those originally encircled.

== Into Western Ukraine ==
On February 5 Colonel Rutko had left command of the division; he was replaced on February 17 by Col. Vasilii Efimovich Vasilev who would remain in this position for the duration of the war. Shortly after the Korsun battle the 138th was moved to the 53rd Army, still in 2nd Ukrainian Front, where it served briefly as a separate division. In March it was transferred to 69th Army in the Reserve of the Supreme High Command, returning to the front a month later in the 95th Rifle Corps, 18th Army of the 1st Ukrainian Front. At around this time the 295th Artillery Regiment was completely equipped with 76mm guns (32 pieces) and no 122mm howitzers, making it, for all intents, a reinforced heavy antitank regiment. This was probably due to the nature of the fighting in Ukraine, where the Germans had most of their armored forces.

Under these commands the division took part in the Lvov–Sandomierz Offensive. While the Front's main drive would be in the direction of Lvov its left-flank 18th and 1st Guards Armies, located south of the Dniestr, were to advance in support in the direction of Stanislav - Drogobych. The main offensive began on July 13 and 18th Army went over to the attack on July 23; by this time the forces of Army Group North Ukraine were largely defeated and survivors were in retreat towards the Carpathian mountains. The offensive was led by three rifle divisions backed by all the Army's artillery and was directed to capture Bogorodchany by the end of July 25, subsequently towards Dolyna in order to drive the Hungarian Army into the mountains. This schedule proved over optimistic but the Army's right flank advanced as much as 20km on July 27. By the start of August the two Armies had effectively cleared the foothills of the Carpathians and set the stage for a subsequent advance into the Carpatho-Ukraine.

=== Into Slovakia ===
In August the 138th moved to 4th Ukrainian Front reserves in 17th Guards Rifle Corps. This Corps operated separately under Front command for several months in the Carpathians before being assigned to 18th Army. The division remained under these commands for the duration. During this time it earned the divisional honorific "Carpathian". Beginning on January 12, 1945 it took part in the Western Carpathian Offensive, mostly facing the German XXXXIX Mountain Corps; on January 20 the division assisted in the capture of the city of Košice and one regiment was awarded an honorific:

KOSICE... 344th Rifle Regiment (Major Armeev, Fyodor Fedorovich)... The troops who participated in the liberation of Košice and nearby towns, by the order of the Supreme High Command of 20 January 1945, and a commendation in Moscow, are given a salute of 20 artillery salvoes from 224 guns.

The division's other rifle regiments would be honored on February 19 for the same battle with the 650th receiving the Order of Suvorov, 3rd Degree and the 768th being awarded the Order of Kutuzov, 3rd Degree. On the same date the 138th as a whole was granted the Order of the Red Banner in recognition of its part in the liberation of Poprad on January 28. Over the following months the division continued its gruelling advance through Slovakia, culminating in the Moravia–Ostrava Offensive.

== Postwar ==
On May 3 the division was awarded the Order of Suvorov, 2nd Degree, for its part in the capture of the city of Ružomberok in Slovakia. By now its full formal title was 138th Rifle, Carpathian, Order of the Red Banner, Order of Suvorov Division. (Russian: 138-я стрелковая Карпатская Краснознамённая орденов Суворова дивизия). Further awards came to several subunits of the division on May 28 when the 344th Rifle Regiment and 295th Artillery Regiment both received the Order of Suvorov, 3rd Degree and the 284th Antitank Battalion was given the Order of the Red Star, all for their roles in the fighting for Ostrava and Žilina in the final offensive into western Slovakia and eastern Moravia. The division was disbanded "in place" a few months later with the Northern Group of Forces.

== In popular culture ==
- In the 1949 Soviet film The Battle of Stalingrad the part of Ivan Lyudnikov was played by Mikhail Nazvanov.
- The 138th (1st formation) is featured extensively in the Historical Advanced Squad Leader module Red Barricades as well as the more recently released Red Factories.
