= 70th Guards Rifle Division =

70th Guards Rifle Division (February 7, 1943 – 1957) 70th Guards Motor Rifle Division (1957–1991)
- Active: 1943–1991
- Country: Soviet Union
- Branch: Red Army (1943-1946); Soviet Army (1946-1991)
- Type: Division
- Role: Infantry
- Engagements: World War II: Battle of Kursk; Operation Kutuzov; Battle of the Dniepr; Battle of Kiev; Kiev Strategic Defensive Operation; Proskurov-Chernivtsi Offensive; Lvov–Sandomierz Offensive; East Carpathian Strategic Offensive Operation; Western Carpathian Offensive; Moravia–Ostrava Offensive; Prague Offensive; Operation Whirlwind
- Decorations: Order of Lenin; Order of the Red Banner (2); Order of Suvorov; Order of Kutuzov; Order of Bogdan Khmelnitsky
- Battle honours: Glukhov

Commanders
- Notable commanders: Maj. Gen. Ivan Ilich Lyudnikov; Maj. Gen. Ivan Andreevich Gusev; Col. Timofei Andronikovich Andrienko; Col. Leonid Ivanovich Gredinarenko

The 70th Guards Rifle Division was formed as an elite infantry division of the Red Army in February, 1943, based on the 1st formation of the 138th Rifle Division in recognition of that division's actions during the battle, and served in that role until well after the end of the Great Patriotic War.

The 70th Guards took part in heavy combat as part of 13th Army on the north flank of the Kursk salient in July 1943, helping to fight the German 9th Army to a standstill before going over to the counteroffensive. It earned a battle honor in the campaign to liberate the Oryol salient before advancing west toward the Dniepr, winning a second Order of the Red Banner in the process. After crossing that river it took part in the campaigns to liberate Kiev and then to hold the city during November. It was briefly assigned to 38th Army, then back to the 13th, before rejoining 38th Army for the duration of the war. It continued to see service through the northwest of Ukraine into the autumn of 1944 as it and its regiments received further battle honors and decorations, particularly as a result of the liberation of Lvov. In November it was reassigned with its Army to the 4th Ukrainian Front and spent the rest of the war battling through the Carpathian mountains, eventually participating in the advance on Prague in May, 1945. In the process the division became one of the most decorated formations of the Red Army.

The 70th Guards later became part of the Soviet Army as a motor rifle division and took part in the Soviet invasion of Hungary in 1956. The division was finally disbanded in 1991.

== Formation ==
The 70th Guards was one of several Guards rifle divisions created in the aftermath of the fighting for Stalingrad, on February 7, 1943. It was formed from the remnants of the 138th Rifle Division, in recognition of that division's stalwart defense against the German 6th Army in the Battle of Stalingrad, in particular the Barrikady Ordnance Factory. When formed, its order of battle was as follows:

- 203rd Guards Rifle Regiment from 344th Rifle Regiment
- 205th Guards Rifle Regiment from 650th Rifle Regiment
- 207th Guards Rifle Regiment from 768th Rifle Regiment
- 137th Guards Artillery Regiment from 295th Artillery Regiment
- 74th Guards Antitank Battalion from 230th Antitank Battalion
- 77th Guards Antiaircraft Battery (until April 20, 1943)
- 69th Guards Reconnaissance Company
- 77th Guards Sapper Battalion
- 99th Guards Signal Battalion
- 76th Guards Medical/Sanitation Battalion
- 72nd Guards Chemical Defense (Anti-gas) Company
- 73rd Guards Motor Transport Company
- 68th Guards Field Bakery
- 66th Guards Divisional Veterinary Hospital
- 464th (later 1102nd) Field Postal Station
- 1785th Field Office of the State Bank

The division inherited the Order of the Red Banner that the 138th had earned during the Winter War with Finland in March, 1940. In addition, on February 22, while it was still officially the 344th Rifle Regiment, the 203rd Guards was awarded the same Order for its service at Stalingrad. Ivan Ilich Lyudnikov, who had been promoted to the rank of major general on January 27, remained in command. In the reallocation of the Soviet forces around Stalingrad the division was soon moved to the Reserve of the Supreme High Command for rebuilding. It was first assigned to Western Front but under STAVKA Order No. 46077 of March 19 it came under orders of Col. Gen. K. K. Rokossovskii's Central Front in the Kursk area. As of the start of April it was still directly under Front command and later in the month it joined the newly formed 17th Guards Rifle Corps with the 6th and 75th Guards Rifle Divisions.

== Battle of Kursk ==
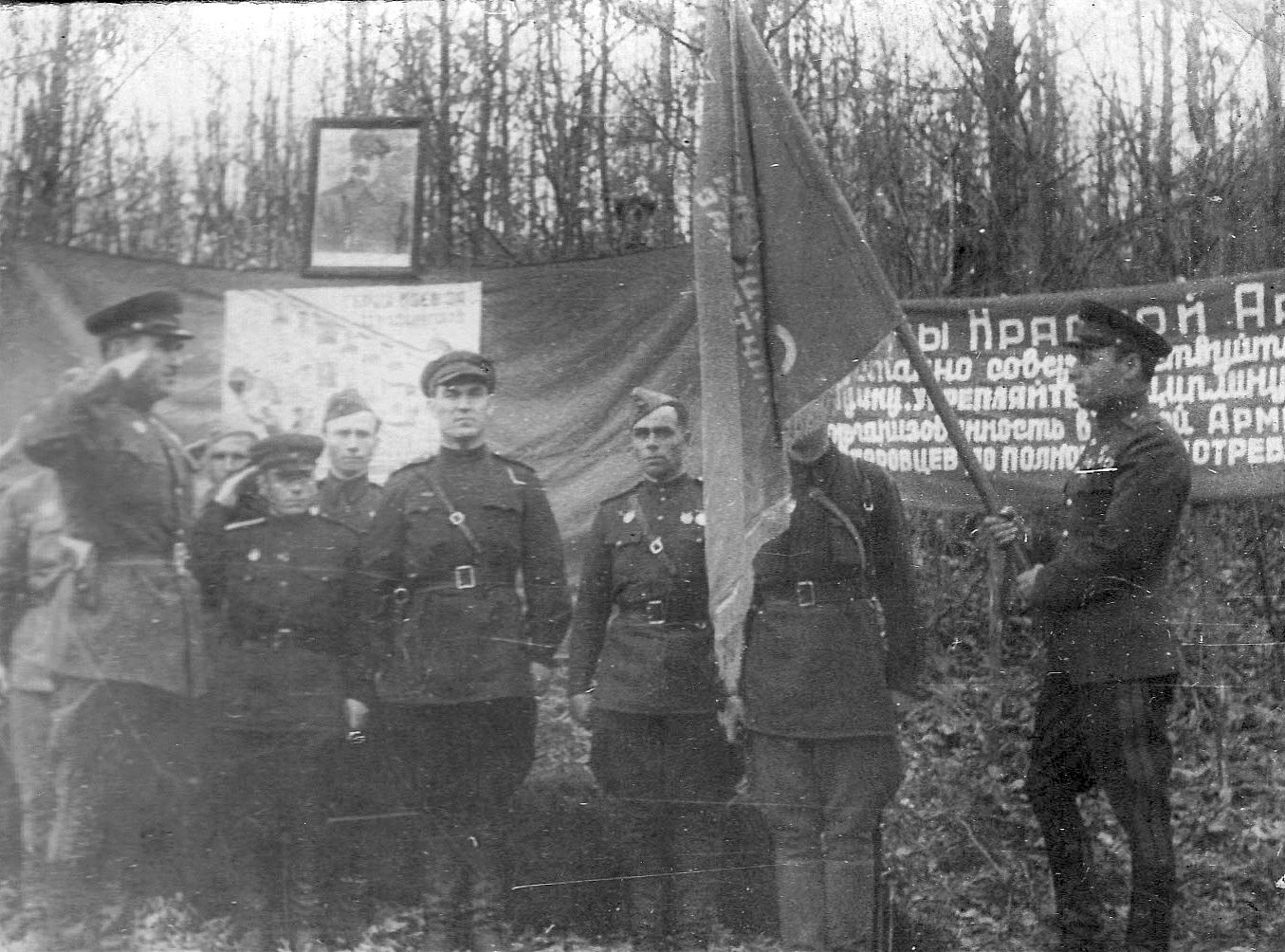
Presentation of the 70th Guards' banner by Lt. Gen. Bondarev (right) to Maj. Gen. Lyudnikov (left).

The division was officially presented its Guards banner by the Corps commander, Lt. Gen. A. L. Bondarev, on April 21. By the beginning of June the Corps was moved into 13th Army which held most of the north shoulder of the Kursk salient. On June 19 General Lyudnikov left the division to take command of the 15th Rifle Corps; he would be named a Hero of the Soviet Union on October 16, eventually command the 39th Army, and be promoted to the rank of colonel general. He was replaced by Col. Ivan Andreevich Gusev, who would be promoted to the rank of major general on September 1.

German plan of attack at Kursk. Note location of Olkhovatka (Olchowatka) on the 13th Army sector.

In the course of the battle the 70th Guards would defend part of the Olkhovatka sector. 13th Army, along with reinforcements, occupied the most important sector of Rokossovskii's front, about 32 km in width, bordered on the right by 48th Army and by 70th Army on the left. The Army had four of its rifle divisions (8th, 15th, 81st and 148th) in its first echelon, two in second echelon, and the 17th and 18th Guards Rifle Corps in reserve. Central Front staff anticipated two probable German attack axes, the first against 48th Army and the second against 13th Army, the latter in the direction of Ponyri, Zolotukhino and Kursk.

When the German offensive, Operation Zitadelle, began on July 5 it soon became apparent that the main attack would be against 13th Army, although somewhat farther to the west of Ponyri than anticipated, and during the morning Rokossovskii sent an order to his army commanders: "At dawn on 6 July begin operations according to variation no. 2." This variant called for the launching of the main counterattack by the two reserve Guards corps and the 2nd Tank Army along the front from Mamoshino–Orlanka–Prilepy–Bityug–Kashara in the general direction of Ladyrevo and Koshelevo, with supporting attacks by elements of 48th and 70th Armies. The 17th Guards Corps was somewhat delayed in its movement and by the end of July 6 was concentrating in the area Bityug–Kashara–Olkhovatka, too late to carry out a planned attack with 16th Tank Corps to restore the situation on the Army's left flank. 16th Tanks had attacked alone, suffered heavy losses against German panzers, and was then ordered by Rokossovskii to dig in. Meanwhile, the commander of 13th Army, Lt. Gen. N. I. Pukhov had allocated substantial reinforcements to 17th Guards Corps, including the 1st Guards Artillery Division, the 378th Antitank Artillery Regiment and the 237th Tank Regiment; this substantial firepower ensured Bondarev would be able to hold the line even without mobile tank support.

By July 8 the 70th Guards was facing elements of the 47th Panzer Corps of Col. Gen. W. Model's 9th Army. Model attempted three major thrusts with his panzers that day, towards Ponyri, Olkhovatka and Teploye. 20th Panzer Division had cleared the way towards the latter after a fierce action for the village of Samodurovka and was followed by the 4th Panzer Division from Model's reserve. In its positions at Olkhovatka and the adjacent Hill 274 to the northeast the division was gradually reinforced with about 20 self-propelled guns (SU-122s of the 1441st SU Regiment,) 30 tanks of the 231st Tank Regiment, 72 antitank guns of the 3rd Antitank Brigade, the 477th Army Mortar Regiment, two battalions of the 16th Guards Mortar Brigade and the 19th Army Cannon Artillery Regiment; the artillery reinforcements totalled 80 guns, mortars and rocket launchers of 120mm or larger size. During the day the 4th Panzer broke through at the junction of the 70th Guards with the 75th Guards but was repulsed after heavy fighting. The 6th Infantry Division fought its way to the lower slope of Hill 274 where it was halted by a hail of fire from above. With its massive firepower and commanding position on the hill the reinforced division stopped the German attacks literally in their tracks, with German losses of up to 50 tanks a day. On July 21 the division became one of the first rifle divisions to be awarded the Order of Lenin. Five gunners or battery commanders of the 137th Guards Artillery Regiment, who fought off German tanks over open sights at point-blank range, became Heroes of the Soviet Union, and the regiment as a whole was awarded the Order of the Red Banner on August 7.

== Operation Kutuzov ==
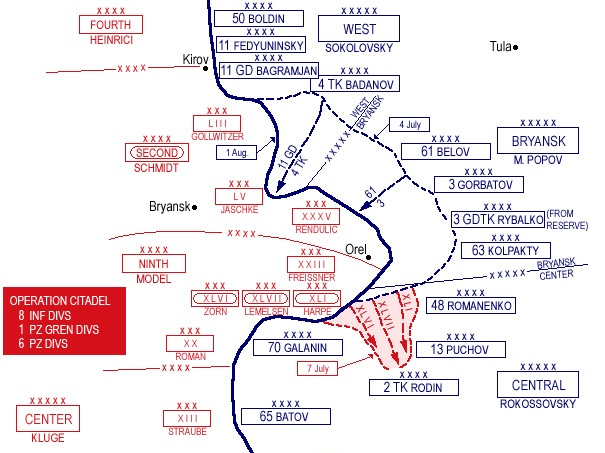
Map of Operation Kutuzov. Note position of 70th Army.

Following the German defeat, the 70th Guards joined in the advance out of the Kursk salient. General Rokossovskii adopted his decision for the offensive on July 12, following the completion of the defensive battle. 13th Army was to attack on the morning of July 15 in the general direction of Gremyachevo and to subsequently develop the attack toward Nestorovo after July 17. These objectives proved over-ambitious and in the reorganization of Central Front that followed the 17th Guards Corps was transferred to 70th Army; as the operation continued it was again shifted, now to 60th Army. On August 30 the division, backed by the 23rd and 95th Tank Brigades and the 1454th Self-propelled Artillery Regiment, was credited with the liberation of the Ukrainian town of Glukhov and got the town's name as an honorific:

GLUKHOV... 70th Guards Rifle Division (Colonel Gusev, Ivan Andreevich)... The troops who participated in the battles near Sevsk, Glukhov and Rylsk, by the order of the Supreme High Command of 31 August 1943, and a commendation in Moscow, are given a salute of 12 artillery salvoes from 124 guns.

On September 9 the division was awarded its second Order of the Red Banner.

Later that month the it was transferred with the rest of 17th Guards Corps back to 13th Army as it advanced through western Ukraine toward the Dniepr River. General Gusev directed the division in crossings of the Seym, Desna and Dniepr rivers, taking and holding bridgeheads in the area of the villages of Teremtsy and Domantovo in the Chernobyl district north of Kiev. In the process the 70th Guards inflicted up to 8,000 casualties, killed and wounded, and took 350 prisoners. In recognition of these accomplishments Gusev was made a Hero of the Soviet Union on October 16. At midnight on October 5 the 13th Army was reassigned to Voronezh Front, which would soon be renamed the 1st Ukrainian Front. At this time both the 13th and 60th Armies were fighting along the right (west) bank of the Dniepr.

== Battle of the Dniepr ==
The Front commander, Army Gen. N. F. Vatutin, was planning a new offensive involving these two armies against the German Kiev group of forces. As part of this plan the 17th Guards Corps (6th and 70th Guards Divisions) was transferred back to 60th Army effective at midnight October 6. During that day and the next the Army was to clear the south bank of the Uzh River before seizing a bridgehead over the Teteriv River. At this time the division had 4,534 personnel on strength, equipped with five 76.2mm regimental guns, 41 medium and heavy mortars, plus 13 76.2mm cannon and eight 122mm howitzers in the 137th Guards Artillery Regiment. In the event this offensive became tied down by German counterattacks until noon on October 11. The 17th and 18th Guards Corps did not have any success but Vatutin insisted that the assault be renewed at noon on October 14 with the intention of linking the bridgeheads held by the two armies to prepare for an advance on Kiev. This attack, and a further effort the next day, made only minor gains which were counterbalanced by German gains on other sectors. The offensive was shut down temporarily on October 17.

=== Battles for Kiev ===
During October 18–23 the 60th Army was engaged in intensive fighting as German forces repeatedly counterattacked along the south bank of the Teteriv. Fending off these attacks expended a great deal of ammunition which forced a postponement of a new Soviet offensive until after October 23. In the plan for this offensive the 60th Army would attack toward Rovy with nine rifle divisions, including the 70th Guards, before driving south along the left bank of the Irpin River in the direction of Kiev. 17th Guards Corps was on the right flank of the Army on a 12 km-wide sector.

At 0800 hours on November 3 the 60th and 38th Armies began their artillery preparations and their infantry and direct-support tanks began to advance at 0840. Despite heavy German fire and counterattacks a breakthrough was made by the shock groups and both armies advanced 5–12 km during the day. The 17th Guards Corps was mostly engaged in local fighting to improve its positions. Throughout the day Vatutin insistently demanded that 60th Army increase the pace of its attack since the success of 38th Army's operations on the Kiev axis were dependent on the former's advance. Despite this the 70th Guards was not engaged in active operations until after it was removed overnight on November 5/6 from 17th Guards Corps to reinforce the Army's left wing. By this time the 38th Army was fighting within central Kiev, which was liberated early in the morning of November 6; on the same day the left wing of 60th Army advanced 12 km.

Vatutin ordered the offensive to continue into western Ukraine with 60th Army directed to take bridgeheads over the Teteriv in the area of Radomyshl by the end of November 9. The 70th Guards returned to 17th Guards Corps where it joined the 211th Rifle Division; the Corps was held in the Army's second echelon. On November 11 the Army cleared the Teteriv along its entire front, advanced from 10 to 25 km and captured 200 prisoners and large amounts of equipment. During the next day the Corps moved to the south of the Army's main axis and by the day's end had reached 38th Army's sector in the Stavetskaya Sloboda area; by now that Army was approaching Zhytomyr. Throughout the advancing Soviet forces divisional artillery was falling behind, ammunition was in short supply, and 38th Army was starting to face counterattacks from panzer forces. During the evening the STAVKA ordered Vatutin to cease the advance and consolidate the liberated area. As part of this order the 17th Guards Corps was transferred to 38th Army. At this time the 70th Guards had 3,793 personnel on strength.

==== Kiev Strategic Defensive Operation ====
During the rest of November the 1st Ukrainian Front was on the defensive, under attack by the 4th Panzer Army. In the morning of November 15 the division was organizing a defense along a line from outside Gnilets to Lisovka to Turbovka. This line was incomplete when it was struck by the 1st Panzer and 1st SS Panzer Divisions. In heavy fighting throughout the day against 38th Army the German forces managed to capture Solovyovka and drive the 17th Guards Corps to the north. The next day the two German divisions continued to attempt to break through to Brusyliv but were only able to reach Divin by the end of the day, forcing the 70th Guards to fall back to the village of Vilshka. This retreat allowed the division to link up with the 7th Guards Tank Corps. Despite heavy resistance on November 17 the panzers were able to reach the paved road from Kiev to Zhytomyr, threatening to envelop the Soviet forces there. 38th Army continued to reorganize the following day and the 17th Guards Corps, which now included the 75th Guards Division, was engaged in defensive fighting along a front from Tsarevka to Privorotye to Morozovka. Overnight General Vatutin issued orders to the Army to launch a counteroffensive on November 21. During these few days of combat the division had been reduced to 2,768 personnel.

During November 19 the momentum of 4th Panzer Army began to decline, although 17th Guards Corps was forced to abandon Morozovka. After regrouping the panzer forces focused on encircling 38th Army's Brusyliv group of forces and although the town was taken on November 23 and Vatutin's planned counterstroke was suspended the encirclement was not successful. Fighting continued through November 25–29 but both sides were by now effectively played out. During the regroupings that took place during this week the 70th Guards was reassigned to the 52nd Rifle Corps.

== Into Western Ukraine ==
During December the 70th Guards returned to 13th Army, now as part of the 28th Rifle Corps. In January, 1944 it was moved back to 38th Army where it joined the 101st Rifle Corps. Apart from one brief reassignment the division would remain under these commands for the duration of the war. In March the 1st Ukrainian Front launched its part of the Proskurov-Chernivtsi Offensive and in the course of this the division took part in the liberation of Vinnytsia, for which it was awarded the Order of Bogdan Khmelnitsky, 2nd Degree, on March 23. On April 29 General Gusev handed his command to Col. Timofei Andronikovich Andrienko.

=== Lvov–Sandomierz Offensive ===
After directing the division's fighting along the Dniestr River during the spring Colonel Andrienko handed his command back to General Gusev on July 4. In the planning for the Lvov-Sandomierz operation in July the 38th Army was to penetrate the German defense in the Bzovitsa and Bogdanovka sector on a width of 6 km. It would then develop the offensive with seven divisions in the direction of Peremyshliany with the objective of encircling the German Lvov grouping in cooperation with the 4th Tank and 60th Armies. 70th Guards was temporarily motorized with the 26th Truck Brigade to exploit the breakthrough of the German lines. The offensive began on July 13 and went largely according to this plan; Lvov was liberated on July 27 and three days later the 101st Rifle Corps reached a line from Przemyśl to Dobromyl before forcing the San River south of Dynów and capturing the town of Sanok. On July 27 one rifle regiment and the artillery regiment had each been awarded a battle honor:

LVOV... 203rd Guards Rifle Regiment (Colonel Ryndin, Pyotr Mikhailovich)... 137th Guards Artillery Regiment (Major Sokolov, Vladimir Georgievich)... The troops who participated in the liberation of Lvov, by the order of the Supreme High Command of 27 July 1944, and a commendation in Moscow, are given a salute of 20 artillery salvoes from 224 guns.

On August 10 the 205th and 207th Guards Rifle Regiments would also be rewarded for their roles in the Lvov battles with the Order of the Red Banner.

== Into the Carpathians ==
During September it was noted that the personnel of the 70th Guards were about 50 percent Russian (from year groups 1894–1927, a very wide age range) and about 50 percent of various Asian nationalities. Over that month and the next the division took part in the East Carpathian Offensive, particularly in the area of the Dukla Pass. In October it was transferred to the 76th Rifle Corps but returned to the 101st Corps in November when 38th Army was itself transferred to 4th Ukrainian Front, where it would remain for the duration of the war.

Fighting died down until the start of the Western Carpathian Offensive on January 12, 1945. 38th Army attacked following a heavy artillery preparation with the 101st and 67th Rifle Corps and by January 15 had broken through the XI SS Army Corps and began advancing westward. Four days later the 205th Regiment was awarded an honorific:

JASLO... 205th Guards Rifle Regiment (Lt. Colonel Bakanov, Semyon Nesterovich)... The troops who participated in the capture of Jasło and Gorlice, by the order of the Supreme High Command of 19 January 1945, and a commendation in Moscow, are given a salute of 20 artillery salvoes from 224 guns.

In addition, on February 19 the 203rd Guards Regiment would be decorated with the Order of Bogdan Khmelnitsky, 2nd Degree (an unusual award for a regiment) while the 207th Guards Regiment would receive the Order of Suvorov, 3rd Degree.

Due to being wounded for the fourth time General Gusev was forced to hand his command to Maj. Gen. Dmitrii Yakovlevich Grigorev on February 25 but this staff officer was in turn replaced on March 10 by Col. Leonid Ivanovich Gredinarenko, who would remain in this post for the duration. The Moravia–Ostrava Offensive began the same day and during the course of the operation the 70th Guards was rewarded for its part in the capture of Bielsko with the Order of Suvorov, 2nd Degree, on April 5. The division ended the war near Prague. Its full title at this time was 70th Guards Rifle, Glukhov, Order of Lenin, twice Order of the Red Banner, Order of Suvorov, Order of Bogdan Khmelnitsky Division. (Russian: 70-я гвардейская стрелковая Глухов орденом Ленина дважды орденом Краснознамённая орденов Суворова и Богдана Хмельницкого дивизия.)

== Postwar ==
Following the German surrender the subunits of the division received further distinctions. On May 28, in recognition of their roles in the liberation of Opava, the 205th Guards Rifle Regiment was awarded the Order of Alexander Nevsky, while the 99th Guards Signal Battalion received the Order of the Red Star. On the same date the following were decorated for their parts in the fighting for Ostrava and Žilina: 203rd and 205th Guards Rifle Regiments (Order of Suvorov, 3rd Degree); 207th Guards Rifle Regiment (Order of Alexander Nevsky); 74th Guards Antitank Battalion (Order of Bogdan Khmelnitsky, 3rd Degree). In a final round of awards on June 4 the division as a whole received the Order of Kutuzov, 2nd Degree, for its part in the liberation of Bohumín and nearby towns, while the 77th Guards Sapper Battalion was given the same Order in the 3rd Degree, the 207th Guards Regiment won the Order of Bogdan Khmelnitsky, 2nd Degree, and the 203rd Guards Regiment was awarded the Order of Alexander Nevsky, all for the battle for Olomouc.

The division was withdrawn with its corps to the Carpathian Military District and was based at Stanislav (later Ivano-Frankivsk) postwar. After the 101st Rifle Corps was disbanded the division became part of the 35th Guards Rifle Corps. The 70th Guards Rifle Division was attached to the 8th Tank Army during Operation Whirlwind in November 1956. The 70th Guards Rifle was redesignated the 70th Guards Motor Rifle Division on 25 June 1957 and directly subordinated to the 38th Army. The 207th Guards Motor Rifle Regiment, 104th Guards Tank Regiment, the 137th Guards Artillery Regiment, and the 1159th Anti-Aircraft Rocket Regiment were at Kolomyia. The 203rd Guards Motor Rifle Regiment was at Nadvirna, and the 205th Guards Motor Rifle Regiment was at Ivano-Frankivsk. In January 1991 the division became the 857th Military Equipment Storage Base, and in the next month was taken over by Ukraine.
