= 200th Rifle Division =

200th Rifle Division (March 14, 1941 - September 20, 1941) 200th Rifle Division (December 1941 - July 1945)
- Active: 1941–1945
- Country: Soviet Union
- Branch: Red Army
- Type: Infantry
- Size: Division
- Engagements: Operation Barbarossa; Battle of Kiev (1941); Demyansk Pocket; Battle of Nevel (1943); Operation Bagration; Baltic Offensive; Riga Offensive (1944); Vistula-Oder Offensive; East Pomeranian offensive Battle of Berlin
- Decorations: Order of the Red Banner (2nd formation)
- Battle honours: Dvina (2nd formation)

Commanders
- Notable commanders: Col. Ivan Ilich Lyudnikov; Col. Konstantin Alekseevich Elshin; Col. Pyotr Efimovich Popov; Col. Mikhail Emmanuilovich Moskalik; Col. Borumil Yosifovich Zobin; Maj. Gen. Ignatii Aleksandrovich Krasnov; Col. Vasilii Andrianovich Asafev; Col. Yosif Ilich Melder

The 200th Rifle Division was an infantry division of the Red Army, originally formed as part of the prewar buildup of forces, based on the shtat (table of organization and equipment) of September 13, 1939. After being formed in the far east of the USSR just months before the German invasion it was moved to the northern Ukraine where it soon joined the 5th Army north of Kiev. The presence of this Army in the fastnesses of the eastern Pripyat area influenced German strategy as it appeared to threaten both the left flank of Army Group South and the right flank of Army Group Center. In September the latter Group was turned south to encircle the Soviet forces defending Kiev and in the process the 200th was cut off and destroyed.

A new 200th Division was created from the redesignated 425th Rifle Division in February 1942 and was soon assigned to the 11th Army of Northwestern Front. It then spent nearly 10 months in the dismal and costly fighting against the German II Army Corps that was nearly encircled at Demyansk. After this salient was evacuated in March 1943 the division became bogged down in similar battles along the Lovat and Polist Rivers. From November 1943 until the end of the war the 200th was moved extensively among several commands as it took part in fighting near Nevel and on into the Baltic states, where it won a battle honor, Poland, and eastern Germany. At the time of the German surrender it was in 49th Army, linking up with British forces in northern Germany. In April and May its four regiments were each decorated for their roles in the East Pomeranian campaign and the division itself won the Order of the Red Banner in June. Shortly after the division was disbanded.

== 1st Formation ==
The division officially formed on March 14, 1941, in the Far Eastern Front but almost immediately began moving west by rail intending to reach Korosten in the Kiev Special Military District. As of June 22, 1941 it had the following order of battle:

- 642nd Rifle Regiment
- 648th Rifle Regiment
- 661st Rifle Regiment
- 650th Light Artillery Regiment
- 461st Howitzer Artillery Regiment
- 107th Antitank Battalion
- 134th Antiaircraft Battalion
- 300th Reconnaissance Battalion
- 400th Sapper Battalion
- 600th Signal Battalion
- 405th Medical/Sanitation Battalion
- 350th Chemical Defense (Anti-gas) Company
- 299th Motor Transport Company
- 640th Field Postal Station
- 512th Field Office of the State Bank

Col. Ivan Ilich Lyudnikov was appointed to command on the day the division formed; he had previously served as commandant of the Zhitomir Infantry School. When the German invasion began the division was in the reserves of Southwestern Front (the renamed Kiev District) as part of the 31st Rifle Corps, which also included the 193rd and 195th Rifle Divisions. The Corps was soon alerted to move west from Korosten and by the end of June 27 the 200th was approaching Rozhyshche, which had just been captured by the 14th Panzer Division.

=== Battle of Kiev ===
The division had seen its first action the previous day at Viche and by June 28 it was trying to defend the line of the Styr River at Bobovich. As of the beginning of July the 31st Corps, which now contained just the 200th and 193rd, had been assigned to Southwestern Front's 5th Army, which was concentrating in the eastern Pripyat area on the north flank of the forces of Army Group South advancing on Kiev. By the end of July 7 the two divisions were attempting to hold an extended front along the Sluch River northwest of Novohrad-Volynskyi against the XXIX Army Corps but a week later the 200th had been forced back to north of Yemilchyne. In the interim the 195th Division had rejoined the Corps. The presence of 5th Army in this region was beginning to affect German strategy as noted in Führer directive No. 33 of July 19:

The Kiev fortifications and the Soviet 5th Army's operations on our rear have inhibited active operations and free maneuver on Army Group South's northern flank.

The directive set the task, among others, "to destroy the Soviet 5th Army by means of a closely coordinated offensive by the forces on Army Group Center's southern flank and Army Group South's northern flank."

Over the following weeks the division made a well-organized retreat, falling back to a line along the Uzh River by the end of August 11, but continuous combat was wearing the division down; by August 19 it had only 1,684 personnel on strength, less than half the strength of a prewar rifle regiment. On August 1 Colonel Lyudnikov had been withdrawn from command and placed at the disposal of the Front headquarters. He was replaced the next day by his chief of staff, Maj. Aleksei Pavlovich Kolpachev who would remain in command for the duration of the 1st formation. After recovering from wounds suffered during his escape from the Kiev Pocket Lyudnikov would go on to lead the 138th Rifle Division in the fighting for the Barricady Factory in the Battle of Stalingrad, becoming a Hero of the Soviet Union and reaching the rank of colonel general before the end of the war.

Gomel fell to forces of German 2nd Army on August 19 which effectively unhinged the defenses of the Soviet 21st Army east of the Dniepr. The commander of Southwestern Front, Marshal S. M. Budyonny, signalled the STAVKA that this Army's divisions were withdrawing to a line some 20 km north of the Repki region where the 200th was organizing defenses. In response to this crisis the division was ordered at noon on August 27 to move in that direction in order to come under that Army's command along with the 62nd Rifle Division. This order was overridden on September 1 when the 200th was directed to hold its present positions and carry out reconnaissance. Meanwhile, in late August the 2nd Panzer Group and 2nd Army of Army Group Center began their drives southward. At this time the 200th was attempting to hold positions west of Chernihiv from elements of the XXIII Army Corps outflanking it to the east. By September 10 the remnants of 5th Army were grouped north of Kozelets but on September 16 the 2nd Panzers linked up with the 1st Panzer Group of Army Group South well to the east and the Army was deeply encircled. The division was officially declared destroyed on September 20; Major Kolpachev was taken prisoner but survived the war, being released in 1945.

== 2nd Formation ==
The 425th Rifle Division began forming in December at Buzuluk in the South Ural Military District, based on the rifle division shtat of December 6, 1941. Most of the 400-series divisions would be redesignated with the numbers of previously disbanded formations, and in February 1942 the 425th became the 2nd formation of the 200th Rifle Division. In April it was assigned to the Reserve of the Supreme High Command from where it went to the 11th Army of Northwestern Front in May. The division's order of battle remained similar to that of the 1st formation:

- 642nd Rifle Regiment
- 648th Rifle Regiment
- 661st Rifle Regiment
- 650th Artillery Regiment
- 107th Antitank Battalion
- 106th Mortar Battalion (until October 15, 1942)
- 300th Reconnaissance Company
- 400th Sapper Battalion
- 600th Signal Battalion (later 183rd, 405th Signal Companies)
- 405th Medical/Sanitation Battalion
- 507th Chemical Defense (Anti-gas) Company
- 299th Motor Transport Company
- 424th Field Bakery
- 889th Divisional Veterinary Hospital
- 1679th Field Postal Station
- 1080th Field Office of the State Bank

Col. Konstantin Alekseevich Elshin was given command of the division on January 14, 1942. In an operation that had begun in early January the Northwestern Front, led by its 11th Army, had first isolated and later completely encircled the German II Army Corps of 16th Army in the area of Demyansk. This led to a dismal campaign amidst forests and swamps that stretched into the beginning of March 1943.

=== Battle of Demyansk ===
Prior to the arrival of the 200th the German forces had managed to restore land communications through the "Ramushevo corridor" on March 21 although its forces in the salient would continue to rely on air supply for most of its needs for the duration. The division was under 11th Army command by the beginning of May, and as a fresh unit was committed on the 3rd to an attack to cut the corridor in conjunction with the 1st Shock Army from the south. The Soviet forces continued the assault for two weeks but could not cut the 4 km-wide pathway, although artillery fire prevented German supply convoys from using it most of the time. Further efforts were made by the two armies from July into November but these made little impact on the heavily fortified corridor. In the November assault the division was likely part of the 11th Army's shock group which was led by the 202nd Rifle Division. Later that month the 200th was moved to the 27th Army, still in Northwestern Front. On August 8 Colonel Elshin had left command of the division; he was replaced the following day by Col. Pyotr Efimovich Popov, but this officer would in turn be replaced on December 9 by Col. Mikhail Emmanuilovich Moskalik, who had previously commanded the 384th Rifle Division.

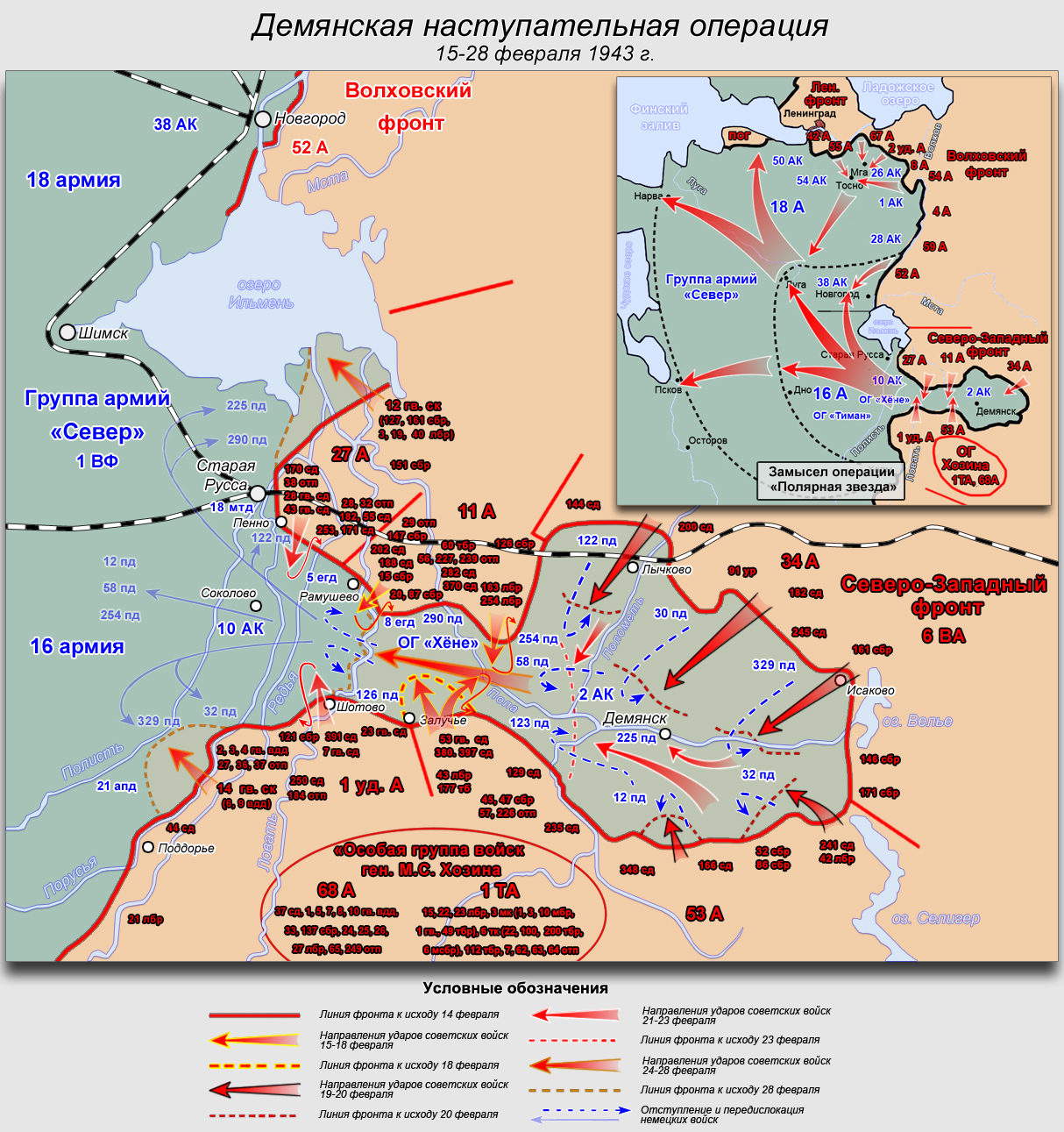
Operation Ziethen. Note the position of the 200th Rifle Division near the right flank of 34th Army.

In January 1943 the 200th was assigned to 34th Army which, like the 27th, was holding positions around Demyansk. On February 22 Colonel Moskalik was moved to command of the 171st Rifle Division and was replaced by Col. Borumil Yosifovich Zobin. On the morning of February 17 the II Army Corps had begun Operation Ziethen, the evacuation of the salient, and Demyansk itself was burned to the ground on February 21. Ski units of 34th Army were committed to a pursuit but were unable to inflict any serious harm. By early March the German forces had pulled back to prepared positions along the Lovat River; by then the 200th had returned to 11th Army.

=== Battles along the Lovat ===
11th Army had been earmarked by Marshal G. K. Zhukov for his planned Operation Polar Star which was to encircle and destroy German 18th Army south of Leningrad, but the evacuation of Demyansk threw these plans into disarray. An attack by the Army south of Ramushevo in conjunction with the 34th and 53rd Armies on March 14 made almost no gains at considerable cost and on the 17th the STAVKA ordered it halted. With the spring thaw arriving the entire Soviet-German front went into a relative lull in April. During that month the 200th was reassigned to the 68th Army but in May returned to 34th Army where it was assigned to 12th Guards Rifle Corps. This began a peripatetic existence for the division as it moved among Fronts, armies and rifle corps for the duration of the war.

== Into Western Russia ==
In July the 200th left the 12th Guards Corps and joined the 1st Shock Army, which also contained the 23rd Guards, 282nd and 391st Rifle Divisions, and the 33rd Rifle Brigade. Through the next several months 1st Shock Army would be lightly engaged with elements of German 16th Army along the Polist River. On October 6 the 3rd and 4th Shock Armies of Kalinin Front (as of October 20 1st Baltic Front) made a surprise breakthrough of the German lines at Nevel and soon expanded this into a deep salient dividing Army Groups North and Center. On October 23 Colonel Zobin left the division and was replaced by Col. Yakov Afanasevich Ivenkov. After Northwestern Front was disbanded in November the 200th was reassigned to the 93rd Rifle Corps of 3rd Shock Army which was deep inside the salient, now as part of 2nd Baltic Front.

=== Battle of Nevel ===
The situation around Nevel was extremely complex and included a long German-held salient from Novosokolniki south nearly to Nevel. German domination of the high ground, powerful defensive positions and difficult terrain and weather prevented any progress in cutting it off during November and 93rd Corps was forced to hold defensively along its western side. On December 1 the German 23rd Infantry Division launched a local attack against the overextended 200th, driving it out of the village of Turki-Perevoz, advancing 3–4 km, crossing the Ushcha River, and reaching the outskirts of Somino where the division finally managed to contain the advance. This was a highly dangerous situation as German command of the heights near the latter village would effectively cut the only supply road to the Soviet forces south of Pustoshka. The 379th and the 18th Guards Rifle Division were immediately dispatched to the threatened sector. On December 5 the German force briefly seized the heights outside Somino but were driven off by the two newly arrived divisions and the 28th Rifle Division attacking from the south. The situation was stabilized by December 10. In the course of this fighting the division was transferred to 90th Rifle Corps, still in 3rd Shock Army. On December 18 Col. Ignatii Aleksandrovich Krasnov took over from Colonel Ivenkov. Krasnov had previously been chief of staff, and briefly in acting command, of 93rd Corps; he would be promoted to the rank of major general on June 3, 1944.

2nd Baltic planned a new offensive to clear the salient in early January 1944. However this was preempted beginning on December 29 when Field Marshal G. von Küchler, commander of Army Group North, began a phased withdrawal which took place over six days. This caught the Soviets by surprise and while 3rd Shock and 6th Guards Army hastily organized a pursuit this did nothing but harass the retreating Germans. During January the 200th returned to 12th Guards Corps, now in the 6th Guards Army of 2nd Baltic Front, but in February it was moved to the 19th Guards Rifle Corps of 10th Guards Army before being assigned again to 93rd Corps in 3rd Shock Army in March. It remained under these commands until June.

During the winter months the division organized a ski battalion from its own personnel, which was fairly common among rifle divisions serving north of Moscow. It was authorised to have 417 men but by January 18 it had only 60 on strength.

== Into the Baltic States ==
At the outset of Operation Bagration the division was still in 93rd Corps of 3rd Shock Army in 2nd Baltic Front, which had only a secondary role in the offensive, but by the beginning of July it had been reassigned to the 100th Rifle Corps of 4th Shock Army in 1st Baltic Front, joining the 21st Guards and 28th Rifle Divisions. On June 27 it was located northeast of Polotsk as 4th Shock began its attack in support of the overall offensive. This met stubborn resistance from the German 205th and 24th Infantry Divisions and could not advance farther than the Makarov Islands Woods. On the morning of July 1 the city came under concentric attack from forces of both 4th Shock and 6th Guards Armies, including 100th Corps, and on July 4 Polotsk fell into Soviet hands. Two days later General Krasnov was killed in action in the vicinity of the village of Zvaniga; he was replaced by Maj. Gen. of Technical Troops Efim Antonovich Lyashenko.

By the second week of July the 200th had pushed through the Panther Line to a position due north of Polotsk and east of the Drissa River in cooperation with the 16th Lithuanian Rifle Division. After Polotsk was taken the pace of the advance quickened and by August 1 the 200th had taken part in the liberation of Daugavpils; on August 9 the division was awarded the honorific "Dvina" in recognition of its successes in the fighting along that river. By the beginning of September the 100th Corps had been moved to 3rd Shock Army, still in 2nd Baltic Front; on August 24 General Lyashenko had been replaced in command by Col. Vasilii Andrianovich Asafev, who had previously served as commander, and later deputy commander, of the 56th Guards Rifle Division. As of mid-September the Army had reached the area of Jēkabpils and as the advance continued into October it was located near Iecava. Later that month the 100th Corps was reassigned to 22nd Army, still in 2nd Baltic Front, but in December the division was moved back to the 93rd Corps which was currently under that Army's command.

== Into Germany ==
On December 2 the 200th was removed to the Reserve of the Supreme High Command for redeployment. It returned to the front on December 7 to join the 114th Rifle Corps of 70th Army in the 2nd Belorussian Front. It would remain under this Front command for the duration of the war.

Prior to the start of the Vistula-Oder Offensive the 70th Army had been substantially reinforced and now contained nine rifle divisions organized in three corps. It was located in the Serock bridgehead with the 96th Rifle Corps deployed in a single echelon between Guty and Ciepielin and one division of 47th Rifle Corps also in the front line. The 114th Corps was in the Army's second echelon in the area northeast of Serock. The Army's task was to attack on a 3 km-wide front in the direction of Nasielsk on the first day, outflank Modlin from the north and then drive west to help prevent the German Warsaw grouping from retreating behind the Vistula. The 114th Corps would remain in reserve in the initial phase.

2nd Belorussian Front began its offensive on the morning of January 14, 1945. On January 17 the 70th Army made a fighting advance of up to 14 km against sagging resistance, forced the Wkra and began fighting for the eastern and southeastern outskirts of Modlin. The 114th Corps was now committed from behind the Army's right flank, although one of its divisions remained in second echelon. The following day, after stubborn fighting, the Army secured both the town and fortress. The Front's objective was now to reach the mouth of the Vistula and the Baltic coast, thus cutting off the German forces in East Prussia.

During the last week of January the Army seized a bridgehead over the lower Vistula between Fordon and Chełmno and was fighting to widen it while also blockading the German garrison of Toruń. The latter city was understood to contain 3,000 - 4,000 German troops and one division plus a regiment of the 47th Corps was considered sufficient to contain it on this sector. In fact it contained 30,000 men and on the night of January 30/31 the garrison attempted to break out to the northwest. The 200th, which was in the Army's second echelon on the western bank of the Vistula about 15–20 km west of Kulm, was immediately directed to intercept the escaping grouping and was soon joined by four other rifle divisions and some of the armor of 1st Guards Tank Corps. During the following week nearly all the forces of 70th Army were involved in containing and eventually eliminating this breakout which was completed on February 8; only small groups succeeded in escaping to the west.

=== East Pomeranian Offensive ===
The next phase of the offensive began on February 10. By this time the 1st Belorussian Front had reached the Oder River and appeared poised to advance on Berlin but the STAVKA was concerned about the potential of German counteroffensive action driving south from Pomerania and ordered the commander of 2nd Belorussian Front, Marshal K. K. Rokossovsky, to complete the isolation of East Prussia and eliminate this flank threat. Prior to the start most of the 114th Corps was transferred to 65th Army but the 200th was moved to 96th Corps, still in 70th Army. On February 14 Colonel Asafev was placed at disposal of the Front command; in early March he would be given command of the 313th Rifle Division. He was replaced by Col. Yosif Ilich Melder, who would lead the division until it was disbanded.

After a brief halt and a regrouping 70th Army was ordered to resume the offensive on February 22 in the direction of Konarzyny, Reinwasser and Bartin. Later in the month the main objective of 2nd Belorussian Front was the group of German forces in Gdańsk and Gdynia. On March 23, 70th Army, with the help of flanking forces of other armies, broke through the German defenses and captured the town of Sopot and reached the shore of Gdańsk Bay. 96th Corps was then directed northwards, towards Kolibken, south of Gdynia. In the course of the fighting the 200th was shifted yet again, now to the 121st Rifle Corps of 49th Army. On May 17 the 642nd Rifle Regiment would be awarded the Order of Suvorov, 3rd Degree, in recognition of its part in the battle for Gdańsk.

=== Berlin Offensive ===
As the division redeployed to the west for the final campaign against the German heartland its subunits received several honors on April 5. The 648th Rifle Regiment was awarded the Order of the Red Banner for its part in the capture of Chojnice and Tuchola. The 661st Rifle Regiment was granted the same decoration and the 400th Sapper Battalion was given the Order of Bogdan Khmelnitsky, 3rd Degree, both for their roles in the battles for Baldenburg and several other towns in Pomerania. On April 26 the 650th Artillery Regiment would be awarded the Order of the Red Banner for its part in the battles for Bytów and Kościerzyna.

Prior to the outset of the Berlin Operation the 200th was still in 121st Corps along with the 191st and 330th Rifle Divisions but these were soon regrouped as the 70th Rifle Corps, which served as 49th Army's second echelon. After the German defenses were breached along the lower Oder five battalions of the 200th were crossed to the west bank on April 25, along with a battalion of the 191st. On May 3 the forward detachments of 49th Army established contact with the British 2nd Army along the Elde River.

== Postwar ==
According to STAVKA Order No. 11095 of May 29, 1945, parts 5 and 6, the 200th is listed as one of the rifle divisions to be transferred to the Group of Soviet Forces in Germany by June 3 but also to be "disbanded in place" shortly after to provide replacements for the remaining divisions. Shortly before this took place, on June 4 the division was decorated with the Order of the Red Banner for its part in the capture of the towns of Eggesin, Torgelow and Templin, west of the Oder in the Berlin campaign. The division was disbanded during July 1945.
