= Ivan Lyudnikov =

Soviet Army Colonel General

Ivan Ilyich Lyudnikov
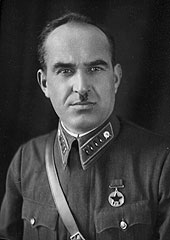
- Native name: Иван Ильич Людников
- Born: 8 October 1902; Krivaya Kosa, Don Host Oblast, Russian Empire
- Died: 22 April 1976 (aged 73) Moscow, Soviet Union
- Buried: Novodevichy Cemetery
- Allegiance: Soviet Union
- Branch: Soviet Army
- Service years: 1918–1968
- Rank: Colonel general
- Commands: 15th Rifle Corps; 39th Army; 10th Guards Army; 13th Army; Tauric Military District
- Conflicts: Russian Civil War; World War II; Battle of Kiev; Battle of Stalingrad; Battle of Kursk; Operation Bagration; Baltic Offensive; East Prussian Offensive; Invasion of Manchuria
- Awards: Hero of the Soviet Union

Ivan Ilyich Lyudnikov (Russian: Иван Ильич Людников; Krivaya Kosa (Don Host Oblast, Russian Empire), 8 October [O.S. 26 September] 1902 – Moscow, 22 April 1976) was a Soviet Army Colonel General and Hero of the Soviet Union.

== Early life ==
Ivan Lyudnikov was born on 8 October 1902, in Krivaya Kosa in the Don Host Oblast. In 1913, he began working alongside his father at Mine No. 2 in the Shcheglovskogo Coal Mine. He became a coal sorter, then a drainage pump worker in 1914. He became an apprentice turner at the mine workshop in 1915, and in 1916 became a turner.

== Russian Civil War ==
On 25 October 1917, Lyudnikov became a volunteer in the Yuzovsky Red Guard Group. In April 1918, he became a machine gunner in the special machine gun detachment commanded by Abrosimov on the Southern Front and was wounded. In May, he became a Red Army man and a machine gunner in the detachment of S.A. Bondarenko. In December, he transferred to the 1st Cavalry Regiment of the 42nd Rifle Division, part of Semyon Budyonny's 1st Cavalry Army. Lyudnikov became a VKSLM (Russian Young Communist League) member in 1919, elected by personnel of the 1st Cavalry Regiment. He became a Red Navy man serving on the gunboat Znamya sotsializma, under the command of Sergey Kolbasev, part of the Azov Flotilla and based at the Mariupol Naval Base. He fought against the White Army led by Alexey Kaledin, Anton Denikin and Pyotr Nikolayevich Wrangel during the Allied intervention in the Russian Civil War between 1918 and 1922.

== Interwar ==
After the war was over, he was educated at the following military educational institutions:

- 94 infantry commanding officer of the Ukrainian Military District (8 August 1922 – 1 January 1923)
- Odessa infantry division (1 January 1923 – 8 August 1925)
- Commander at the 13th Dagestan infantry division, course and battalion course commander at the Vladikavkaz infantry school (1925)
- Machine gun course at the Vystrel course (1930)
- Frunze Military Academy (April 1935 – 8 September 1938)

Printed order 00128 of 29 August 1938 appointed him the special affairs officer of the Red Army 1st department. Beginning April 1939, he was leading two sections of the 13 branch department of the Red Army. Its main task was in preparing operations workers for army headquarters and commanding Zhitomir infantry school.

== Great Patriotic War ==
=== The initial period of the war ===
By 22 June 1941, Colonel Lyudnikov was commanding 200th Rifle Division that was part of 31st Rifle Corps, in charge of military district and located south of the city of Sarny. Later, the 200th Rifle Division was added to the 5th Army and took part in the First Battle of Kiev. Occupying the Korosten fortified area (in Russian), they, along with other units, made numerous flank attacks on the 6th German Army aiming at Kiev. After being withdrawn from the river Dnieper, 200th Division took part in defensive fighting for Chernihiv. On 12 September, the division and its staff was attacked from the air, as a result Lyudnikov was wounded seriously in the head and his feet were broken. He was treated at Kharkiv hospital and then at Kazan military hospital No. 361.

After his treatment was over, in November 1941, Lyudnikov received command of the 16th Separate Rifle Brigade, organized on the basis of Grozny and some other defence schools of the North Caucasian defence district. The brigade became part of the 56th Army of the North Caucasus Military District. In late November, the brigade took part in the recapture of Rostov-on-Don. From 26 March 1942, Lyudnikov was assigned command of several divisions: the 218th Rifle Division of the North Caucasus Military District, and the 404th Rifle Division, the 390th Armenian Rifle Division and the 63rd Mountain Rifle Division of the 44th Army. Due to changes in the situation at the front, he did not take command of these. On 29 May 1942, he took command of the 138th Rifle Division, which he held for 9 months.

=== Battle of Stalingrad ===
138th Rifle Division was fighting the enemy in Stalingrad in October–December 1942. For 100 days and nights the division conducted fighting at the Barrikady works in the area of the lower settlement. This territory of 700 m × 400 m (2,300 ft × 1,300 ft) was encircled on three sides, the fourth was Volga river. The remnants of the unit held on against ferocious German assaults. On 25 January 1943, the Division's units were relieved when the German 6th Army was close to surrendering. For their part in the fighting for Stalingrad, the division was reorganized into the 70th Guards Rifle Division on 6 February 1943.

=== Battle of Kursk and Battle of the Dnieper ===
On 1 June 1943, Lyudnikov was appointed commander of the 15th Rifle Corps, carried out his orders on defence as part of 13th Army in the Battle of Kursk, and then went over to the offensive. On 22 September, forward units approached Dnieper north of the city of Chernobyl and began forcing it without a pause. After seizing the bridge-head on the right bank they repulsed counterattacks and started battle for widening the bridge-head. Lyudnikov was taken note of for his successful management in forcing Dnieper, showing audacity and courage. He was honored with the title of the Hero of the Soviet Union, presented with the order of Lenin and the Gold Star (No. 1892 of 16 October 1943).

=== Operation Bagration ===
The Red Army performed attack Operation Bagration (named for the Russian commander in the Patriotic war of 1812). At the time, Lyudnikov was in command of 39 Army at the 3rd Belorussian Front. Together with 43 Army of the 1st Baltic Front, Army general Beloborodov made an attack operation against German forces in June 1944. This operation is also known as Vitebsk–Orsha Offensive or Vitebsk Orsha pocket. This operation resulted in liberation of 447 settlements in 4 days, including Vitebsk and Orsha.

=== Baltic Offensive ===
On the decision of General Headquarters, the authority of 39 Army was temporarily delegated to 1st Baltic Front to take part in the Baltic Offensive. The army was given the combat mission of seizing the Daugavpils–Pabradė line and further developing an offensive on Kaunas and Šiauliai. Daugavpils was liberated on 27 July, and then Panevėžys and Šiauliai. Kaunas was liberated on 1 August and the army came to the Raseiniai–Suwałki line, positions suitable to defense north of Neman at the borders of East Prussia. Lyudnikov's forces received the tactical task of capturing the well-equipped town of Tauragė, which allowed them to block the enemy's main path from Tilsit across the Neman. Army troops seized Tauragė and on 9 October crossed the border of the German reich, entering Augstogallen. The army had advanced 150 km (93 mi) in 6 days of attacks.

=== East Prussian Offensive ===
Ivan Chernyakhovsky, commander of the 3rd Belorussian Front, set the tactical task to 39th Army that put it into operation on the second day of attack in the direction of Kudirkos Naumiestis, Pilkallen, Hensnishkenen. The 39 army started their advance on 17 October, encountered opposition, and carried only 21 km (13 mi) in a week. The offensive was postponed (what is sometimes called the First East Prussian Offensive or the Gumbinnen Operation) until greater reserves could be gathered, and 39th army held their positions.

When the offensive was to resume on 13 January 1945, fog made fire observation of a planned artillery attack impossible. As the advance began to fade, Lyudnikov decided to carry all tanks and self-propelled guns south of Pilkallen, a direction considered secondary. The tanks were given the task of breaking through the defence line and carrying out the advance, while infantry had to apply all efforts to pressure the enemy and develop a victory. If the breakthrough was successful, then developing it to the north-west for Tilsit could surprise the whole Insterburg group of Germans. Sleet and snow prevented starting the attack in the morning; the weather calmed by 16:00 hours, and the tanks made advance and by 22:00, gaining 12–16 km (7.5–9.9 mi). A breach was formed, and on 17 January 1945, the 5th Guard and 94th Infantry corps broke through the Gumbinnen defence line and entered cities of Pilkallen and Hensnishkenen.

The army forces seized Tilsit on 19 January, and 39 Army reached Dejma river. It took several days for the advanced divisions to cross the river by ferry. Army forces moved forward by 18 km (11 mi).

Lyudnikov received the task of creating the fortified defence line, made a roundabout way from the north, then from the west, and reached the Baltic sea, separating it from the German forces. Army forces seized the railway station Metgethen, cutting communication between Königsberg and Pillau.

On 16 April 1945, the Army forces seized the city of Fischhausen, and this ended the fighting in East Prussia. Lyudnikov was promoted to Lieutenant general.

=== Soviet–Japanese War ===
From 12 May, the 39th Army began to transfer to the Far East in preparation for the Soviet invasion of Manchuria. The 39th Army fought in the invasion of Manchuria. At the end of the war the army reached the Liaodong Peninsula, where it would garrison until the withdrawal of Soviet troops from China. For his leadership, Lyudnikov received the Order of Suvorov 1st class. He was also awarded the Medal "For the Victory over Japan", given to Soviet military personnel who participated in the campaign.

== Commander of military forces ==
- 200th Rifle Division of Kiev Military District (10 March – 14 September 1941)
- 16th separate brigade of students (24 December 1941 – March 1942)
- 390th Rifle Division (1st formation) (30 March – 18 April 1942)
- 138th Rifle Division (29 May 1942 – 15 February 1943)
- 70th Guards Rifle Division (15 February – 1 June 1943)
- 15th Rifle Corps (1 June 1943 – 27 May 1944)
- 39th Army (27 May 1944 – June 1947)

== Postwar ==
Lyudnikov was commandant of Port Arthur and commander of Soviet troops on the Liaodong Peninsula until 1947. On 29 November 1947, he became commander of the 10th Guards Army in the Leningrad Military District. On 20 April 1948, he became commander of the 13th Army in the Carpathian Military District. On 13 December 1949, Lyudnikov became deputy commander of the Group of Soviet Forces in Germany. In November 1951, he was sent to the Military Academy of the General Staff to take Higher Academic Courses, graduating a year later on 1 November 1952.

On 28 November, he became deputy commander of the Odessa Military District. Two years later, Lyudnikov transferred to command the Tauric Military District on 6 September 1954. On 10 June 1956, he became Warsaw Pact Supreme Command representative to the Ministry of National Defence of Bulgaria. Lyudnikov became commander of the Vystrel Higher Officer Training Courses on 26 March 1959. On 28 November 1963, he became faculty head at the Military Academy of the General Staff. In late 1968, Lyudnikov retired. He died on 22 April 1976 in Moscow, and was buried at the Novodevichy Cemetery.

== Honors and awards ==
- Honorary citizen of Ternopil (1969)
- Honorary citizen of Vitebsk (1974)

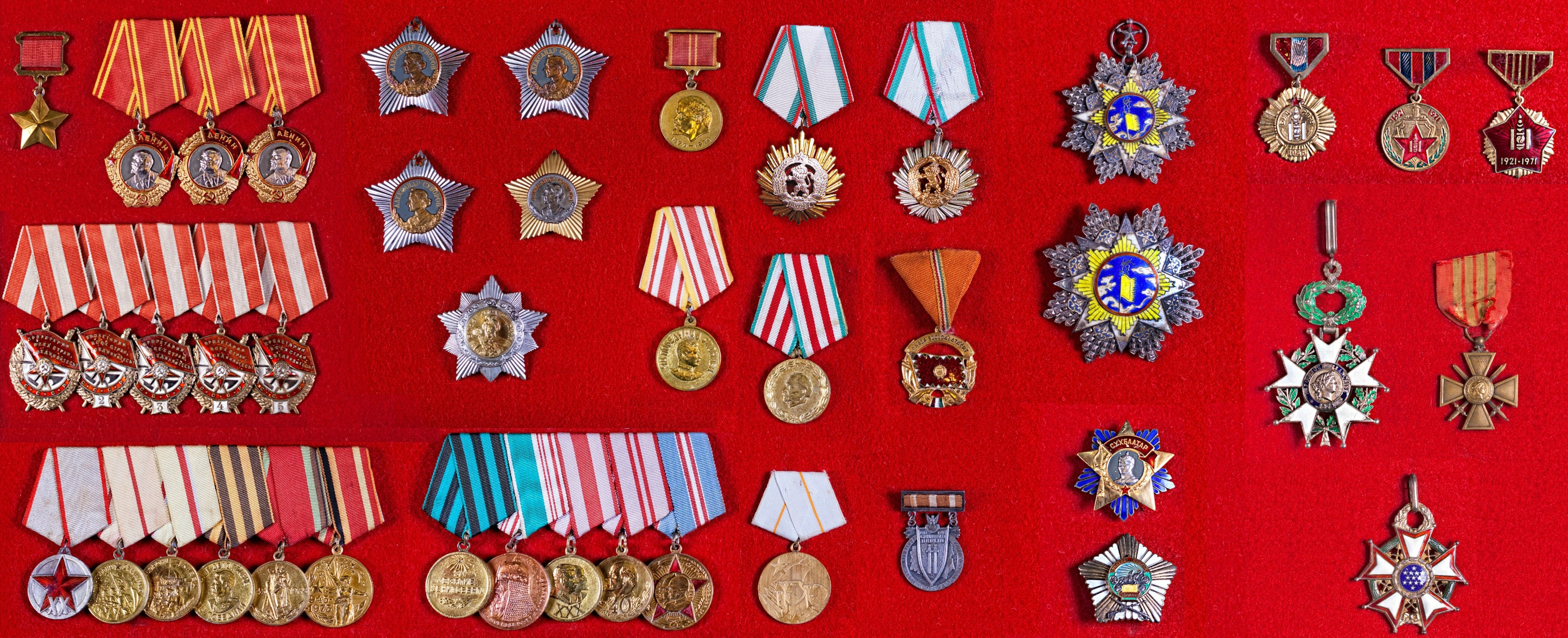
Lyudnikov's decorations in the Stalingrad Museum

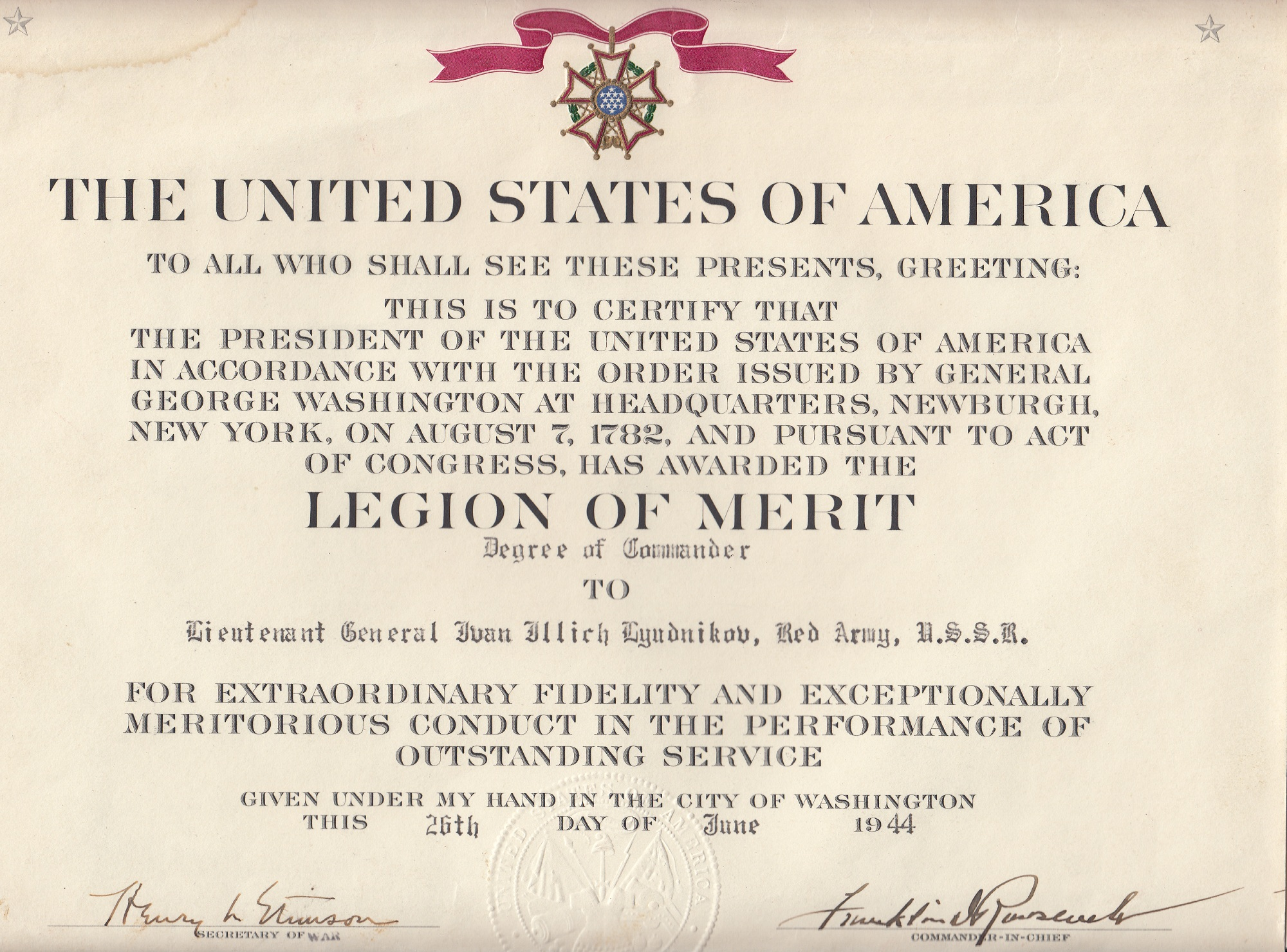
Lyudnikov's Legion of Merit citation

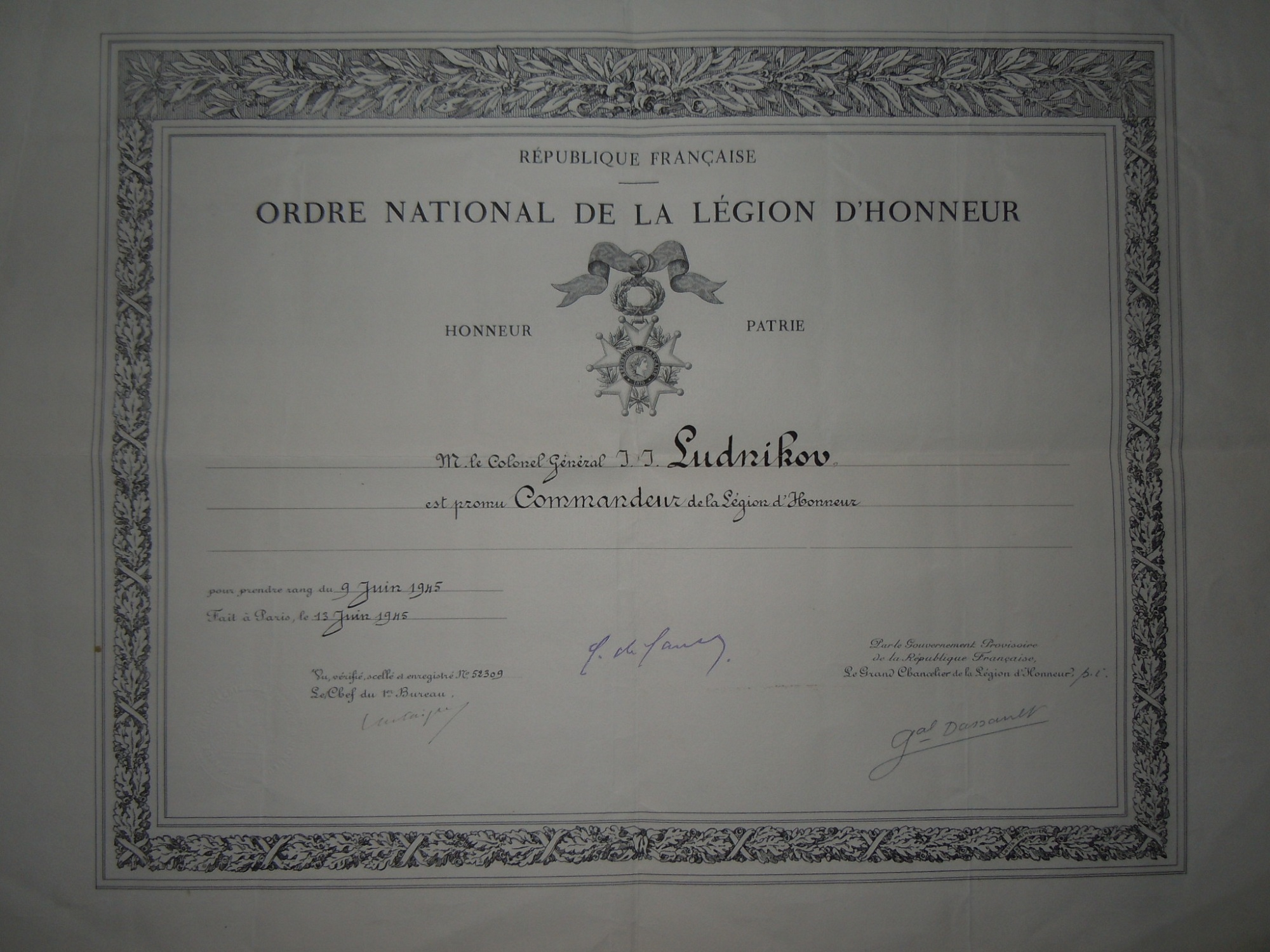
Lyudnikov's Legion of Honour citation

=== Soviet orders and medals ===
- Gold Star of the Hero of the Soviet Union No. 1892 (16 October 1943)
- 3× Order of Lenin (22 February 1943, 16 October 1943, 21 February 1945)
- 5× Order of the Red Banner (27 March 1942, 27 August 1943, 3 November 1944, February 1968)
- 3× Order of Suvorov, 1st class (4 July 1944, 19 April 1945, 8 September 1945)
- Order of Suvorov, 2nd class (16 September 1943)
- Order of Bogdan Khmelnitsky (10 January 1944)
- Jubilee Medal "XX Years of the Workers' and Peasants' Red Army" (22 February 1938)
- Medal "For the Defence of Stalingrad" (1 May 1944)
- Medal "For the Defence of Kiev"
- Medal "For the Capture of Königsberg" (9 June 1945)
- Medal "For the Victory over Germany in the Great Patriotic War 1941–1945" (9 June 1945)
- Medal "For the Victory over Japan" (30 September 1945)
- Medal "In Commemoration of the 800th Anniversary of Moscow"
- Jubilee Medal "30 Years of the Soviet Army and Navy"
- Jubilee Medal "40 Years of the Armed Forces of the USSR"
- Jubilee Medal "Twenty Years of Victory in the Great Patriotic War 1941–1945"
- Jubilee Medal "50 Years of the Armed Forces of the USSR"
- Jubilee Medal "In Commemoration of the 100th Anniversary of the Birth of Vladimir Ilyich Lenin"
- Jubilee Medal "Thirty Years of Victory in the Great Patriotic War 1941–1945"

=== Foreign awards ===
- Legion of Honour, Commandeur (13 July 1945), French Republic, 13 July 1945.
- Legion of Merit, Commander's Cross (26 June 1944), United States, 26 June 1944.
- Order Of The People's Republic Of Bulgaria 1st Class, People's Republic of Bulgaria.
- Order Of The People's Republic Of Bulgaria 2nd Class, People's Republic of Bulgaria.
- Order of the Cloud and Banner 2nd class, Republic of China, September 1945.
- Order of Sukhbaatar, Mongolian People's Republic.
- Order "For Military Merit"(in Russian), Mongolian People's Republic.
- Croix de Guerre, French Republic, 13 July 1945.
- Medal "For the Victory over Japan"(in Russian), Mongolian People's Republic.
- Medal "50 Years of the Mongolian People's Revolution"(in Russian), Mongolian People's Republic.
- Medal "50 Years of the Mongolian People's Army"(in Russian), Mongolian People's Republic.
- Medal "20 years of the Bulgarian People's Army", People's Republic of Bulgaria.
- Medal Brotherhood in Arms(in Polish), Polish People's Republic.
- Medal Brotherhood in Arms, German Democratic Republic.
- Medal For Service to the Motherland, Hungarian People's Republic.

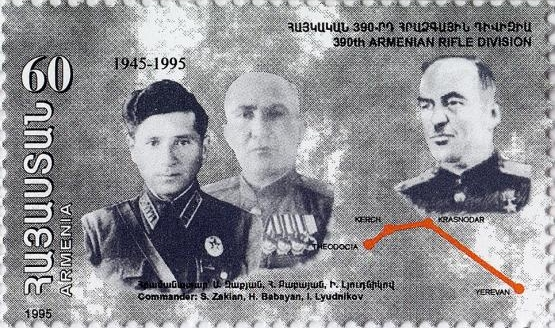
1995 Armenian stamp depicting Zakian, Lyudnikov and Babadzhanian

== Legacy ==
In 1995, Armenia issued a postage stamp depicting 390th Rifle Division commanders Simon Zakian, Hamazasp Babadzhanian and Lyudnikov.

The former 1 Sadovy st. in Vitebsk was renamed Lyudnikov Avenue in 1976. It is situated in one of the most picturesque regions of the city. An informational memorial board was placed at the beginning of the Avenue, with a bas-relief of Ivan Lyudnikov, Hero of the Soviet Union.

Memorial ensemble "Ostrov Lyudnikova" in Volgograd (formerly Stalingrad) is situated at the territory of Lower Barrikady settlement.

Great autonomous trawler-freezer, constructed on 7 October 1982 and was received by the ocean fishbreeding base of the Sovetskaya Gavan in 1983.

A memorial board was placed, in October 2015, on the house at the crossing of Dmitry Ulyanov street(in Russian) and Leninsky Avenue where I.Lyudnikov was living from 1950 to 1976.

In the film The Battle of Stalingrad, the role of Lyudnikov was played by Mikhail Nazvanov(in Russian).

On 12 October 2012, a meeting was held at Sjedove, commemorating Lyudnikov's 110th birthday, at which was presented the book Полководец с Кривой Косы (English: Commander from Krivaya Kosa), a biography of Lyudnikov. The book was written by Alexei Andreyevich Popov and Viktor Nikolayevich Beschastny, two Donetsk Oblast historians.
