= 62nd Rifle Division =

- Active: 1936–1945; 1955–1957
- Country: Soviet Union
- Branch: Red Army; Soviet Army
- Type: Infantry
- Garrison/HQ: Termez (4th formation)
- Engagements: Winter War World War II: Battle of Kiev (1941); Case Blue; Operation Bagration
- Decorations: Order of the Red Banner (3rd and 4th formations) Order of the Red Banner of Labour (1st and 3rd formations); Order of Suvorov 2nd class (3rd formation) Order of Kutuzov 2nd class (3rd formation)
- Battle honours: Turkestan (1st formation) Borisov (3rd formation) Nevel (4th formation)

Commanders
- Notable commanders: Semyon Levin

The 62nd Rifle Division was an infantry division of the Soviet Union's Red Army, formed four times and active during World War II and the postwar period. The division was formed in 1936 and fought in the Winter War and Soviet occupation of Bessarabia and Northern Bukovina. It was destroyed during the Battle of Kiev in summer 1941. The division was reformed in November 1941. It fought in the defense against the German offensive Case Blue during the summer of 1942. After suffering heavy losses, it was withdrawn from combat but was sent back to fight in the Battle of Stalingrad in November. The division suffered heavy losses and was disbanded on 2 November. The division was reformed a third time from a rifle brigade in April 1943. It fought in Operation Suvorov, Operation Bagration, the East Prussian Offensive and the Prague Offensive. It was disbanded in the summer of 1945. The 62nd was reformed a fourth time by renaming the 360th Rifle Division, but became the 108th Motor Rifle Division in 1957.

== History ==
=== First formation ===
The division's first formation was originally formed as the 2nd Muslim Rifle Division during the Russian Civil War on 26 October 1919 in Samara from the 1st and 2nd Tatar Rifle Brigades, part of the Turkestan Front. On 24 November it was renamed the 2nd Turkestan Rifle Division, receiving the designation Red Communards on 25 January 1920. Meanwhile, on 22 November 1919, the Turkestan Front reorganized the troops of the Turkestan Socialist Federative Republic, with the troops of the Fergana Front being consolidated into the 1st Separate Fergana Rifle Division. On 22 December this unit was reorganized as the 2nd Turkestan Rifle Division. All Soviet units in Fergana Oblast were subordinated to the latter, which in effect became an army-level command, on 25 April. In June 1920, the 2nd Turkestan Rifle Division of Red Communards was transferred to Fergana and merged with the 2nd Turkestan Rifle Division. From then until February 1921 the division fought against the Basmachi movement in Fergana, in the areas of Osh, Nookat, Matchа, Namangan, Uch-Kurgan, Kurgan-Tyube, Gorbua, and the Alay Valley.

On 16 August, as a result of the Basmachi movement, the Turkestan Front formed the Military Soviet of Fergana Oblast from the Military Soviet of the 2nd Turkestan Division. The Military Soviet of the oblast received all military and civilian powers in the region. On 3 October, all of the Soviet troops in Fergana Oblast were combined to form the Fergana Army Group, headed by a Military Soviet formed from the Military Soviet of Fergana Oblast. The army group included the 2nd Turkestan Rifle Division and the 3rd Turkestan Cavalry Division (redesignated as a rifle division in November 1920); its headquarters was formed from that of the 2nd Turkestan Rifle Division.

After the transfer of the troops and headquarters of the 2nd Turkestan Rifle Division to Semirechye Oblast, the headquarters of the newly arrived 3rd Turkestan Rifle Division was given control of the Fergana Army Group. Between May and June the 2nd Turkestan fought in the elimination of the remnants of the troops of Andrey Bakich in the Bakhty and Chuguchak area of Semirechye. On 4 May 1921, the troops in Turkestan were reorganized yet again, and the headquarters of the 3rd Division was redesignated as the headquarters of the 2nd Turkestan Rifle Division, functioning as the headquarters of the Fergana Army Group. The headquarters of the former 2nd Turkestan became the staff of troops in Semirechye Oblast. On 18 September, the headquarters of the Fergana Group was redesignated the staff of troops in Fergana Oblast, the command of the troops was assigned to the commander of the 2nd Division, and he was subordinated to the local Soviet authorities.

In early April 1923, the positions of the commanders of individual oblasts in Turkestan were eliminated, and on 23 April the headquarters of the 2nd Division was reformed; its commander was tasked with the control of the troops in Fergana Oblast. To command the troops in the Fergana Oblast, the Military Soviet of the oblast was reestablished, led by the 2nd Division commander. After the defeat of the main Basmachi forces, the Military Soviet was abolished on 1 April 1924 and command of all troops given to the 2nd Division commander. In June 1926 the division became part of the Central Asian Military District, which replaced the Turkestan Front.

On 21 May 1936, when the Red Army standardized its unit designations, the 2nd Turkestan was renumbered as the 62nd Rifle Division. In June 1940, the division fought in the Soviet occupation of Bessarabia. The corps was with 15th Rifle Corps of 5th Army on 22 June 1941. It was destroyed in the Battle of Kiev. The division was officially disbanded on 19 September.

=== Second formation ===
The division was reformed in November 1941. It joined the 'operational army' on 2 November 1941, serving on the front until 29 July 1942. It then fought on the front again from 7 October 1942 to 2 November 1942. It was then disbanded.

=== Third formation ===
The division was recreated on 15 April 1943 from the 44th Separate Rifle Brigade. In March 1944, it inherited the Order of the Red Banner of Labour from the division's first formation. The division fought in the Battle of Stalingrad and at Kursk. It was with the 31st Army of the 1st Ukrainian Front in May 1945. It was disbanded in the summer of 1945 by the order forming the Central Group of Forces, dated 29 May 1945. On 10 June 1945 Feskov et al. 2013 lists the division as being with 36th Rifle Corps (along with 88th and 331st Rifle Divisions) in the 31st Army.

=== Fourth formation ===
In April 1955, the 62nd Rifle Division was formed a fourth time by renaming the 360th Rifle Division at Termez with the 17th Rifle Corps. This formation inherited the honorific "Nevel" and the Order of the Red Banner from the 360th Rifle Division. On 25 June 1957, it became the 108th Motor Rifle Division.
