= Novy Rogachik =

Novy Rogachik Новый Рогачик
- Urban-type settlement
- Interactive map of Novy Rogachik
- Location of Novy Rogachik Novy Rogachik (Volgograd Oblast)
- Coordinates: 48.6763°N 44.0604°E
- Country: Russia
- Federal subject: Volgograd Oblast
- Administrative district: Gorodishchensky District
- Founded: 1909

Population (2010 Census)
  - Total: 7,166
  - Estimate (2021): 6,383 (−10.9%)
- Time zone: UTC+3 (MSK)
- Postal codes: 403020, 403021
- OKTMO ID: 18605156051

Novy Rogachik (Russian: Новый Рогачик) is an urban locality (an urban-type settlement) in Gorodishchensky District of Volgograd Oblast, Russia. Population: 7,166 (2010 census); 7,558 (2002 census); 6,192 (1989 Soviet census).
