= 15th Rifle Corps =

- Active: 1922–1924; 1934–1941; 1942–1943; 1943–1945
- Country: Soviet Union
- Branch: Red Army
- Type: Rifle corps
- Engagements: World War II; Invasion of Poland; Eastern Front; Operation Barbarossa

The 15th Rifle Corps (Russian: 15-й стрелковый корпус) was a rifle corps of the Red Army, formed five times; each formation was a distinct unit unrelated to the others. It was part of the 5th Army. It took part in the Soviet invasion of Poland in 1939.

== History ==
=== 1922–1924 formation ===
The corps was formed as part of the North Caucasus Military District by an order of 27 September 1922 with the 9th Don, 22nd, and 37th Rifle Divisions, headquartered at Krasnodar. The units of the corps participated in the suppression of anti-Soviet forces in the Kuban-Black Sea Oblast between November 1922 and February 1924. The corps headquarters was disbanded by an order of the district on 12 February 1924.

=== 1934–1941 formation ===
The corps was formed again as part of the Ukrainian Military District by an order of 12 May 1934, headquartered at Chernigov. The corps became part of the Kiev Military District when the Ukrainian Military District was split in June 1935. The corps participated in the Soviet invasion of Poland, under command of Vasily Repin and as part of the 6th Army, and in October returned to the district, renamed the Kiev Special Military District. As a result of the Soviet advance into former Polish territory, the corps headquarters moved west to Kovel. In January 1940 it was relocated to the 13th Army for the Winter War, fighting in the latter between February and March. After the end of the Winter War, the 15th Corps returned to Kiev Special Military District and during June and July was assigned to the 12th Army for the occupation of Bessarabia and northern Bukovina. In July the corps returned to district control.

Corps troops were the 58th Separate Communications Battalion and the 38th Separate Sapper Battalion. The corps headquarters was officially disbanded on 25 September 1941.

=== 1942–1943 formation ===
The corps headquarters was reformed in Voronezh Oblast in November 1942, under the command of Major General Pyotr Privalov. The corps was assigned the 172nd, 267th, and 350th Rifle Divisions. After completing its formation, the corps joined the 6th Army of the Voronezh Front and entered battleon 11 December on the left bank of the Don River near Verkhny Mamon during Operation Little Saturn. It fought in the destruction of Italian and German forces on the Mid-Don and on 16 December crossed the Don, entering the Kantemirovka area on 22 December. The corps then advanced into the Donbas towards Belokurakino, Balakleya, and Krasnograd. In January Privalov was replaced in command of Major General Afanasy Gryaznov. In the second half of February and early March the corps fought against the German counteroffensive in the Third Battle of Kharkov. On 16 April 1943 the 15th Rifle Corps headquarters was converted into that of the headquarters of the 28th Guards Rifle Corps. Corps troops were the 62nd Separate Communications Battalion, 1163rd Field Office of the State Bank, and 2634th Field Postal Station. The divisions of the 15th Rifle Corps were transferred to the control of the 34th Rifle Corps.

=== 1943–1945 formation ===
The corps headquarters was quickly reformed in Moscow beginning on 28 May 1943. Corps troops were the 387th Separate Communications Battalion and 3689th Field Postal Station. The 918th Separate Sapper Battalion and 441st Field Vehicle Repair Base was added in April and May 1944, respectively.

After the end of the war, the corps headquarters was disbanded in mid-1945 as part of the 60th Army. Its divisions were simultaneously disbanded and their personnel used to reinforce divisions of the Northern Group of Forces.

== Organization ==
1939:

- 45th Rifle Division
- 60th Rifle Division
- 87th Rifle Division

1941:

- 45th Rifle Division
- 62nd Rifle Division

== Commanders ==
- Komdiv Pyotr Filatov (Sept 1937 - June 1938)
- Kombrig Fyodor Remezov (July 15 - July 23, 1938)
- Komdiv Vasily Repin (July 1938 - October 1939)
- Kombrig Mikhail Filippovich Korolev (November 1939 - April 1940)
- Major General Ivan Fedyuninsky (April - August 1941)
- Major General Pyotr Privalov (November – December 1942)
- Lieutenant General Ivan Lyudnikov (June 1943 - May 1944)
