= Abganerovo, Oktyabrsky District, Volgograd Oblast =

Abganerovo Абганерово
- Selo
- Location within Volgograd Oblast Location within Russia
- Coordinates: 48°04′N 44°10′E
- Country: Russia
- Region: Volgograd Oblast
- District: Oktyabrsky District Abganerovo village head: Kosenko Maxim Vitalievich
- Time zone: [[UTC+3:00]]

Abganerovo (Russian: Абганерово) is a rural locality (a selo) and the administrative center of Abganerovskoye Rural Settlement of Oktyabrsky District, Volgograd Oblast, Russia. The population was 1631 as of 2017. There are 11 streets.

== Geography ==
The village is located in the upper reaches of the river Gniloy Aksay.

== Ethnicity ==
The village is inhabited by Russians and others.
