= Tsatsa, Volgograd Oblast =

Tsatsa Цаца
- Selo
- Location within Volgograd Oblast Location within Russia
- Coordinates: 48°11′N 44°40′E
- Country: Russia
- Region: Volgograd Oblast
- District: Svetloyarsky District
- Time zone: UTC+4:00

Tsatsa (Russian: Цаца) is a rural locality (a selo) in Svetloyarsky District, Volgograd Oblast, Russia. The population was 1,551 as of 2010. There are 11 streets.

== Geography ==
Tsatsa is located 46 km (29 mi) southwest of Svetly Yar (the district's administrative centre) by road. Novosad is the nearest rural locality.
