= 76 mm regimental gun M1943 =

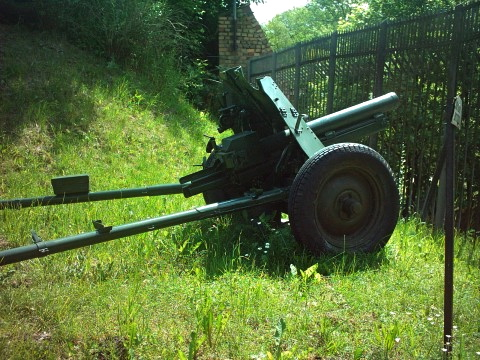
- 76 mm regimental gun M1943 in the Poznań citadel, Poland.
- Type: Infantry support gun
- Place of origin: Soviet Union

Service history
- In service: 1943–1945
- Used by: Soviet Union, Poland
- Wars: World War II

Production history
- Designer: Motovilikha Plants, M. Yu. Tsiryulnikov
- Produced: 1943–1945
- No. built: 5,122

Specifications
- Mass: combat: 600 kg (1,322 lbs) travel: 1,300 kg (2,866 lbs)
- Barrel length: 1.25 m (4.1 ft) L/16.5
- Shell: 76.2 × 167 mm R
- Shell weight: 6.2 kg (13 lb 11 oz)
- Caliber: 76.2 mm (3 in)
- Carriage: split trail
- Elevation: -8° to 25°
- Traverse: 60°
- Rate of fire: 10 - 12 rpm
- Muzzle velocity: 262 - 311 m/s (859 - 1,020 ft/s)
- Maximum firing range: 4.2 km (2.6 mi)

The 76-mm regimental gun M1943 (OB-25) (Russian: 76-мм полковая пушка обр. 1943 г. (ОБ-25)) was a Soviet infantry support gun developed in 1943 by M. Yu. Tsiryulnikov at the ordnance plant in Motovilikha. The gun used a modernized barrel from the 76 mm regimental gun M1927 and the carriage from the 45 mm anti-tank gun M1942 (M-42). The gun was intended for destruction of light field fortifications and openly placed personnel by direct fire. HEAT shells gave it limited anti-armor capabilities. 76.2-mm regimental guns M1943 completely replaced M1927 guns in production that year and were built until the end of the German-Soviet War. Soon after the end of the war the production ceased due to insufficient range and muzzle velocity.

== Ammunition ==
- Ammunition types:
  - Fragmentation-HE: OF-350.
  - Fragmentation: O-350A.
  - HEAT: BP-350M.
- Projectile weight:
  - OF-350: 6.2 kg.
- Muzzle velocity:
  - OF-350, O-350A: 262 m/s.
  - BP-350M: 311 m/s.
- Effective range:
  - OF-350, O-350A: 4,200 m.
  - BP-350M: 1,000 m.

== Users ==
- Soviet Union
- Poland: used by Polish People's Army

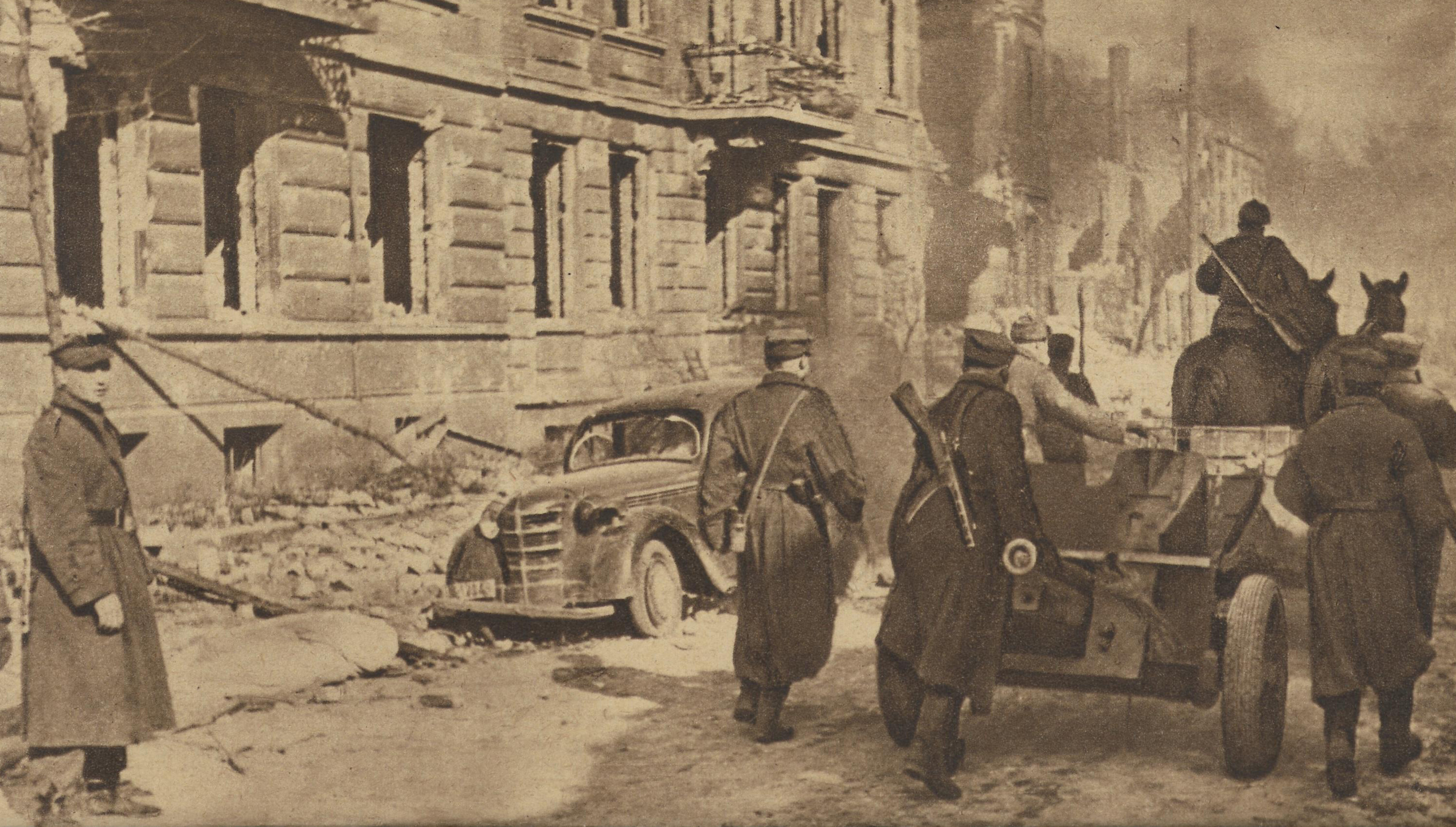
Polish artillerymen taking part in the assault on the port of Kolberg 1945
