= Afanasovo =

Afanasovo may refer to the following rural localities in Russia:

- Afanasovo, Korochansky District, Belgorod Oblast
- Afanasovo, Kirzhachsky District, Vladimir Oblast
- Afanasovo, Muromsky District, Vladimir Oblast
- Afanasovo, Afanasovsky Selsoviet, Babayevsky District, Vologda Oblast
- Afanasovo, Novostarinsky Selsoviet, Babayevsky District, Vologda Oblast
- Afanasovo, Cherepovetsky District, Vologda Oblast
- Afanasovo, Sheksninsky District, Vologda Oblast
- Afanasovo, Vologodsky District, Vologda Oblast
