= Shlyakhovo =

Shlyakhovo Шляхово
- Selo
- Location within Belgorod Oblast Location within Russia
- Coordinates: 50°42′N 36°48′E
- Country: Russia
- Region: Belgorod Oblast
- District: Korochansky District
- Time zone: UTC+3:00

Shlyakhovo (Russian: Шляхово) is a rural locality (a selo) and the administrative center of Shlyakhovskoye Rural Settlement, Korochansky District, Belgorod Oblast, Russia. The population was 238 as of 2010. There are 18 streets.

== Geography ==
Shlyakhovo is located 31 km southwest of Korocha (the district's administrative centre) by road. Melikhovo is the nearest rural locality.
