= Koshcheyevo =

Koshcheyevo Кощеево
- Selo
- Location within Belgorod Oblast Location within Russia
- Coordinates: 50°53′N 37°06′E
- Country: Russia
- Region: Belgorod Oblast
- District: Korochansky District
- Time zone: UTC+3:00

Koshcheyevo (Russian: Кощеево) is a rural locality (a selo) and the administrative center of Koshcheyevskoye Rural Settlement, Korochansky District, Belgorod Oblast, Russia. The population was 894 as of 2010. There are 8 streets.

== Geography ==
Koshcheyevo is located 14 km northwest of Korocha (the district's administrative centre) by road. Yemelyanovka is the nearest rural locality.
