= Bolshaya Khalan =

Bolshaya Khalan Большая Халань
- Selo
- Location within Belgorod Oblast Location within Russia
- Coordinates: 50°55′N 37°25′E
- Country: Russia
- Region: Belgorod Oblast
- District: Korochansky District
- Time zone: UTC+3:00

Bolshaya Khalan (Russian: Большая Халань) is a rural locality (a selo) and the administrative center of Bolshekhalanskoye Rural Settlement, Korochansky District, Belgorod Oblast, Russia. The population was 876 as of 2010. There are 8 streets.

== Geography ==
Bolshaya Khalan is located 24 km northeast of Korocha (the district's administrative centre) by road. Bolshoye Peschanoye is the nearest rural locality.
