= Foshchevatoye =

Foshchevatoye Фощеватое
- Selo
- Location within Belgorod Oblast Location within Russia
- Coordinates: 50°44′N 37°18′E
- Country: Russia
- Region: Belgorod Oblast
- District: Korochansky District
- Time zone: UTC+3:00

Foshchevatoye (Russian: Фощеватое) is a rural locality (a selo) in Korochansky District, Belgorod Oblast, Russia. The population was 190 as of 2010. There are 5 streets.

== Geography ==
Foshchevatoye is located 14 km southeast of Korocha (the district's administrative centre) by road. Krasny is the nearest rural locality.
