= Kazanka, Belgorod Oblast =

Kazanka Казанка
- Selo
- Location within Belgorod Oblast Location within Russia
- Coordinates: 50°49′N 37°13′E
- Country: Russia
- Region: Belgorod Oblast
- District: Korochansky District
- Time zone: UTC+3:00

Kazanka (Russian: Казанка) is a rural locality (a selo) in Korochansky District, Belgorod Oblast, Russia. The population was 488 as of 2010. There are 14 streets.

== Geography ==
Kazanka is located 4 km northeast of Korocha (the district's administrative centre) by road. Bekhteyevka is the nearest rural locality.
