= Ternovoye =

Ternovoye Терновое
- Selo
- Location within Belgorod Oblast Location within Russia
- Coordinates: 50°42′N 37°09′E
- Country: Russia
- Region: Belgorod Oblast
- District: Korochansky District
- Time zone: UTC+3:00

Ternovoye (Russian: Терновое) is a rural locality (a selo) in Korochansky District, Belgorod Oblast, Russia. The population was 210 as of 2010. There are 3 streets.

== Geography ==
Ternovoye is located 13 km south of Korocha (the district's administrative centre) by road. Afanasovo is the nearest rural locality.
