= Sheino =

Sheino Шеино
- Selo
- Location within Belgorod Oblast Location within Russia
- Coordinates: 50°40′N 36°53′E
- Country: Russia
- Region: Belgorod Oblast
- District: Korochansky District
- Time zone: UTC+3:00

Sheino (Russian: Шеино) is a rural locality (a selo) and the administrative center of Sheinskoye Rural Settlement, Korochansky District, Belgorod Oblast, Russia. The population was 750 as of 2010. There are 13 streets.

== Geography ==
Sheino is located 31 km southwest of Korocha (the district's administrative centre) by road. Ushakovo is the nearest rural locality.
