= Yablonovo, Korochansky District, Belgorod Oblast =

Yablonovo Яблоново
- Village
- Interactive map of Yablonovo
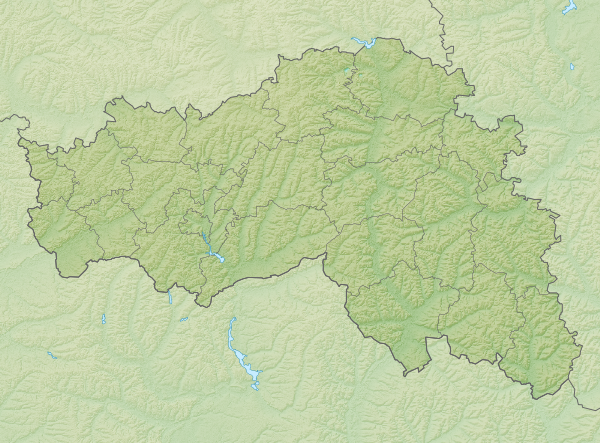
- Location within Belgorod Oblast Location within Russia
- Coordinates: 50°51′N 37°21′E
- Country: Russia
- Region: Belgorod Oblast
- District: Korochansky District
- Time zone: UTC+3:00

Yablonovo (Russian: Яблоново) is a rural locality (a selo) and the administrative center of Yablonovskoye Rural Settlement, Korochansky District, Belgorod Oblast, Russia. The population was 1,711 as of 2010. There are 20 streets.

== Geography & History ==
Yablonovo is located 14.00 kilometres (8.70 mi) northeast of Korocha (the district's administrative centre) by road. Spornoye is the nearest rural locality.

In January 2024, the region was the site of a Il-76 crash during the Russian invasion of Ukraine.
