= Afanasovo, Korochansky District, Belgorod Oblast =

Afanasovo Афанасово
- Selo
- Location within Belgorod Oblast Location within Russia
- Coordinates: 50°43′N 37°09′E
- Country: Russia
- Region: Belgorod Oblast
- District: Korochansky District
- Time zone: UTC+3:00

Afanasovo (Russian: Афанасово) is a rural locality (a selo) in Korochansky District, Belgorod Oblast, Russia. The population was 506 as of 2010. There are 8 streets.

== Geography ==
Afanasovo is located 12 km south of Korocha (the district's administrative centre) by road. Ternovoye is the nearest rural locality.
