= 183rd Rifle Division =

183rd Rifle Division (September 1940 - March 1947)
- Russian: 183-я стрелковая дивизия Latvian: 183. strēlnieku divīzija Ukrainian: 183-тя стрілецька дивізія
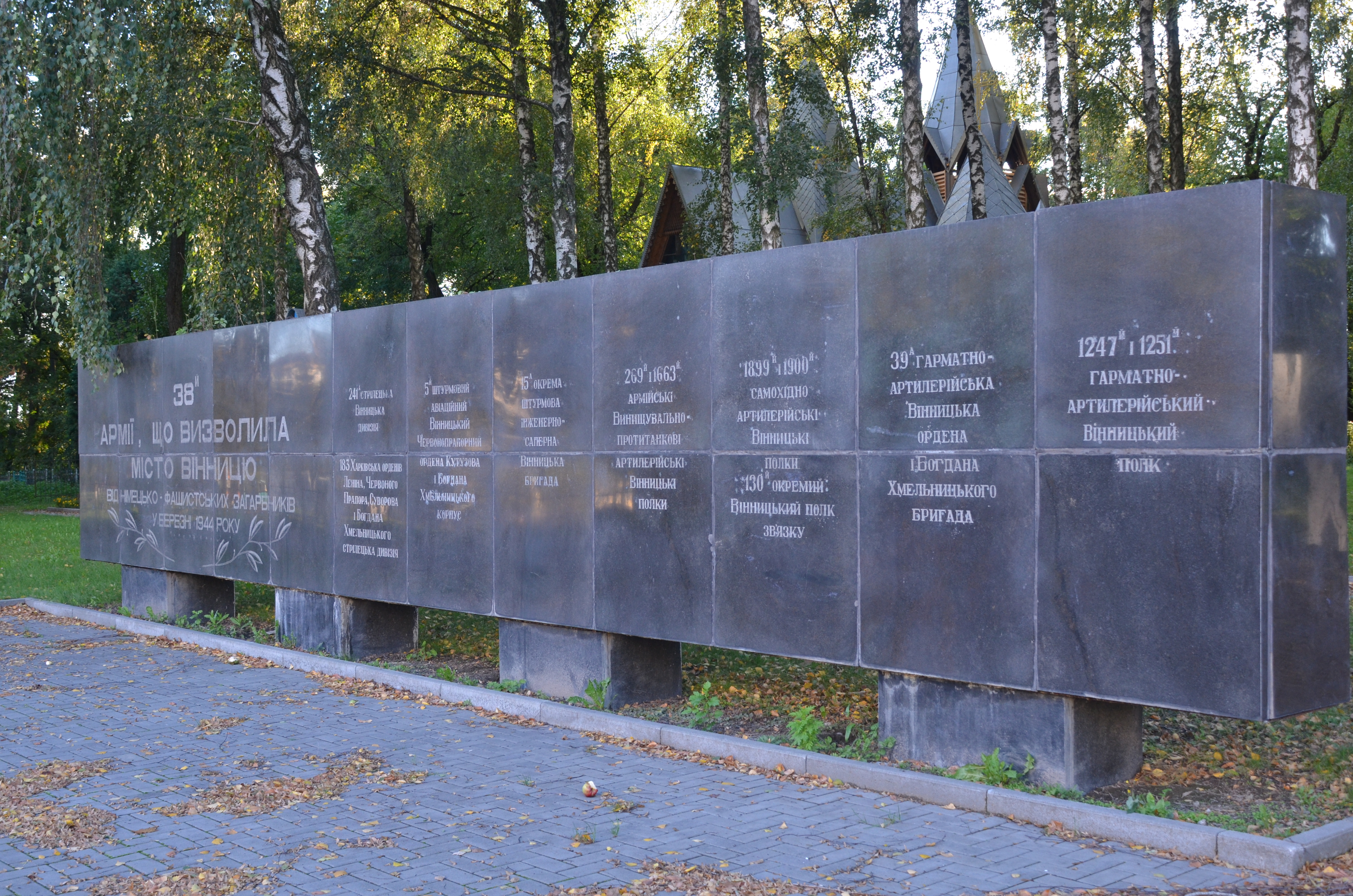
- Memorial at Vinnytsia to units of 38th Army, including the 183rd. (In Ukrainian)
- Active: 1940–1947
- Country: Soviet Union
- Branch: Red Army
- Type: Infantry
- Size: Division
- Engagements: Operation Barbarossa; Leningrad strategic defensive Battle of Moscow; Battles of Rzhev; Voronezh–Kastornoye offensive Operation Star; Third Battle of Kharkov; Battle of Kursk; Battle of Prokhorovka; Operation Roland; Belgorod–Kharkov offensive operation Battle of Kiev (1943); Zhitomir–Berdichev offensive Proskurov-Chernivtsi offensive operation Lvov-Sandomierz Offensive; Battle of the Dukla Pass; Western Carpathian offensive Moravia–Ostrava offensive Prague offensive
- Decorations: Order of Lenin; Order of the Red Banner; Order of Suvorov; Order of Bogdan Khmelnitsky
- Battle honours: Kharkov

Commanders
- Notable commanders: Maj. Gen. Andrejs Krustiņš; Maj. Gen. Konstantin Vasilevich Komissarov; Lt. Col. Pyotr Konstantinovich Ruban; Maj. Gen. Aleksandr Stepanovich Kostitsyn; Maj. Gen. Leonid Dmitrievich Vasilevskii

The 183rd Rifle Division was formed as an infantry division of the Red Army following the Soviet occupation of the Baltic states, based on the shtat (table of organization and equipment) of September 13, 1939, and utilizing the personnel of two divisions of the Latvian Army (renamed the People's Army of Latvia at the time).

At the outbreak of war with Germany it was still in Soviet-occupied Latvia, part of the 24th Rifle Corps of Northwestern Front's 27th Army. It quickly lost strength, both due to combat losses and to the release of some Latvians who were believed to be politically unreliable. In mid-July to took part in 11th Army's counterstroke at Soltsy, which briefly encircled the 8th Panzer Division and delayed the German advance on Leningrad by a week. Following this, the division fell back to the Staraya Russa area. By October it was back in 27th Army and was partly rebuilt with replacements, some coming from the 181st Rifle Division, another Latvian division, which had been disbanded. Later in the month, as part of the new Kalinin Front, it took part in the successful counterstroke against XXXXI Panzer Corps along the road to Torzhok. It was then transferred to 29th Army, in the same Front, and defended against German 9th Army. During the first Rzhev-Vyasma Offensive in January 1942 the 183rd advanced to the outskirts of Rzhev but failed to take it, before being partly and then fully encircled with its Army in early February and suffering heavy casualties. In breaking out its commanding officer was killed.

Through the remainder of the division's service in the Rzhev area it was on the defense, apart from briefly attacking with 30th Army in July/August. In September it left the fighting front for a much-needed rebuilding. Following an extended stay in the Moscow area it was railed south to join 40th Army in Voronezh Front in January 1943. It took part in the encirclement operation of most of German 2nd Army near Kastornoye during that month before being directed to the southwest, liberating the town of Prokhorovka in early February. It remained in this general area through the spring, and defended it during the Battle of Kursk, as part of 69th Army. It saw heavy fighting south of Prokhorovka during the climax of the battle on July 11–12, and was nearly encircled in the following few days when Army Group South attempted to destroy the Russian 48th Rifle Corps. During the following counteroffensive it was part of Steppe Front, and in late August it was awarded a battle honor for its part in the final retaking of Kharkiv.

In September the division was again removed to the Reserve of the Supreme High Command for rebuilding, and returned in November as part of 1st Guards Army in 1st Ukrainian Front. It played a minor role in defending against the German offensive to retake Kyiv, and in late December it went over to the counterattack as part of 38th Army, reaching to just north of Vinnytsia. When the offensive recommenced in March 1944 the 183rd was recognized for its part in the battle for that city with the award of the Order of the Red Banner. In April it returned to 1st Guards Army, but just before the Lviv–Sandomierz Offensive it was again assigned to 38th Army, where it remained for the duration of the war. During this offensive several of its subunits would be awarded battle honors or decorations for the capture of Lviv. Following this, it moved into the Carpathian Mountains, and took part in the fighting for the Dukla Pass.

In November the division was moved, with its Army, to 4th Ukrainian Front, where it would remain for the rest of the war. In January 1945 it began advancing again into southern Poland and Slovakia, winning the Order of Suvorov, 2nd Degree, while several of its subunits were given honors for the capture of Jasło. During March and April the 183rd was involved in difficult fighting through Czechoslovakia, including battles for Opava and Ostrava, before ending the war advancing toward Prague. In the immediate aftermath it became one of the most decorated rifle divisions of the Red Army. Despite this, it was finally disbanded in early 1947.

== Formation ==
The division was formed in September - October 1940, based on the 3rd Latgale Infantry Division and the 4th Zemgale Infantry Division of the People's Army of Latvia (the name of the Latvian Armed Forces after the occupation of Latvia in June 1940). The soldiers continued to wear Latvian uniforms, but with Red Army insignia. It was soon assigned to the 24th Rifle Corps, which also contained the 181st Rifle Division, also of Latvians. Its order of battle on June 22, 1941, was as follows:

- 227th Rifle Regiment
- 285th Rifle Regiment
- 295th Rifle Regiment
- 623rd Artillery Regiment
- 624th Howitzer Artillery Regiment (until September 15, 1941)
- 18th Antitank Battalion
- 22nd Reconnaissance Company
- 304th Sapper Battalion (until September 29, 1941); 490th Sapper Battalion (from September 20, 1941, until October 8, 1943); 304th Sapper Battalion (from October 8, 1943)
- 609th Signal Battalion (later 350th Signal Battalion, 171st Signal Company)
- 13th Medical/Sanitation Battalion
- 259th Chemical Defense (Anti-gas) Company (later 4th)
- 31st Motor Transport Company (later 364th)
- 267th Field Bakery (later 208th)
- 141st Divisional Veterinary Hospital
- 314th Field Postal Station (later 595th)
- 687th Field Office of the State Bank (later 692nd)

Maj. Gen. Andrejs Krustiņš (Andrei Nikolaevich Krustins), who had been in command of the Latvian Army's Latgale Division, was given command of the 183rd, having been transferred to the Red Army in August. On June 3, 1941, he was dismissed from his post, being replaced by Col. Pyotr Nikolaevich Tupikov. Krustiņš was arrested by the Soviets on June 22, the day the German invasion began, and a week later he was condemned to death for "participation in a counter-revolutionary conspiratorial organization." The sentence was carried out by a firing squad on October 16. He would be posthumously rehabilitated on November 30, 1957.

== Defense of Leningrad ==
On June 22 the 183rd was still in 24th Corps, which was now in 27th Army. It was making a road march from near Zosēni and Sobari to camps near Riga, as reported by the commander of the newly designated Northwestern Front, Lt. Gen. F. I. Kuznetsov. There was no source of mobilized reinforcements to bring the division up to full strength, and in fact the Soviet authorities quickly began to send home those Latvians who were judged to be politically unreliable. Colonel Tupikov left the division on July 1 and was replaced by Col. Sergei Isaevich Karapetyan, who had been serving as his deputy. By July 10 the 183rd had left 24th Corps and was serving directly under command of 11th Army, still in Northwestern Front; at this point it had less than 2,000 personnel remaining.

=== Counterstroke at Soltsy ===
At this time the LVI Motorized Corps of 4th Panzer Group, supported by infantry of the I Army Corps, was advancing along the Luga axis through Soltsy toward Novgorod. The 8th Panzer Division, in the vanguard, penetrated 30–40 km along the Shimsk road and reached the town of Soltsy late on July 13. Here it was halted by spirited resistance from the 177th Rifle Division and the 10th Mechanized Corps, skilfully exploiting the difficult terrain. By nightfall the panzers found themselves isolated from the 3rd Motorized Division to its left and the 3rd SS Totenkopf Division lagging in the rear.

Alert for opportunities to strike back, the STAVKA ordered a counterstroke against the overexposed German force. This was communicated to Marshal K. Ye. Voroshilov, who in turn directed 11th Army to attack along the Soltsy-Dno axis with two shock groups. The northern group consisted of the 10th Mechanized's 21st Tank Division and the two divisions of 16th Rifle Corps, with reinforcements. The southern group consisted of the 183rd, 182nd, and 180th Rifle Divisions, gathered together under 22nd Rifle Corps, and was to attack 8th Panzer from the east, with Karapetyan's men moving directly on Soltsy. The assault, launched in oppressive 32 degree C summer heat and massive clouds of dust, caught 8th Panzer and 3rd Motorized totally by surprise. The two divisions were soon isolated from one another and 8th Panzer was forced to fight a costly battle in encirclement for four days. It also disrupted the German offensive plans by forcing 4th Panzer Group to divert 3rd SS from the Kingisepp and Luga axes to rescue the beleaguered panzer division. In his memoirs the commander of LVI Corps, Gen. E. von Manstein, wrote:

Our corps' position at that moment was hardly an enviable one, and we could not help wondering whether we had taken rather too great a risk this time... As matters stood, the only course open to us was to pull 8 Panzer Division back through [S]oltsy to escape the encirclement that now threatened... The next days proved critical, with the enemy straining every nerve to keep up his encirclement and throwing in, besides his rifle divisions, two armoured divisions enjoying strong artillery and air support. 8 Panzer Division nevertheless managed to break through [S]oltsy to the west and re-group, despite having to be temporarily supplied from the air.

The Soltsy counterstroke cost 8th Panzer 70 of its 150 tanks destroyed or damaged and represented the first, albeit temporary, success achieved by Soviet forces on the path to Leningrad. It also cost the German command a precious week to regroup and resume the advance. However, the cost to the Soviet forces was high.

The 183rd had returned to 24th Corps, now in 11th Army, by the beginning of August. Colonel Karapetyan left the division on August 4, being replaced by Col. Aleksandr Nikolaevich Afanasev. After furthering his military education Karapetyan would be promoted to the rank of major general and command three other divisions, most notably the 46th Guards Rifle Division. Afanasev had led the 126th Rifle Division all through 1940 before being demoted to deputy commander. By the middle of the month the division had almost disappeared, and only 50 percent of its personnel were of Latvian nationality. These remnants were in the vicinity of Staraya Russa, as of the beginning of September again under direct command of 11th Army. On September 28 Colonel Afanasev left the division to take over combat training in 34th Army; he would be promoted to major general on November 10, 1942, and would serve in many other roles during and after the war. He was replaced by Maj. Gen. Konstantin Vasilevich Komissarov, who had led the 65th Rifle Corps before it was disbanded. At the beginning of October the 183rd was back in 27th Army, still in Northwestern Front. and during the month it absorbed the remaining personnel of the 181st when that division was disbanded. Between these and other replacements the division was rebuilt to a strength of 7,898 men, 232 automatic weapons (heavy and light machine guns plus submachine guns), 12 mortars and 15 artillery pieces, but no antitank guns.

== Battle for Kalinin ==
Army Group Center launched its Operation Typhoon on September 30 in an attempt to capture Moscow before winter. This offensive was an immediate success, with four Soviet armies encircled and largely destroyed by October 10 in the Vyazma area. With their flanks exposed the armies on each side were forced to fall back. Lt. Gen. N. F. Vatutin, the chief of staff of Northwestern Front, was ordered to organize a force to defend the city of Kalinin. Vatutin's Operational Group would consist of the 183rd and 185th Rifle Divisions, the 46th and 54th Cavalry Divisions, the 8th Tank Brigade, 46th Motorcycle Regiment, and an unnumbered Guards Mortar battalion. Vatutin directed the division to complete concentration in the area of Esenovichi on the morning of October 17. STAVKA Directive No. 003053, dated 1830 hours the same day, established Kalinin Front, under command of Col. Gen. I. S. Konev, consisting of 22nd, 29th, and 30th Armies plus Vatutin's Operational Group, which now also included the 246th Rifle Division.

The city of Kalinin had fallen to the 1st Panzer Division of XXXXI Panzer Corps on October 14. On the same day the 8th Tank Brigade, commanded by Col. P. A. Rotmistrov, was racing toward Vyshny Volochyok and Torzhok from Valdai, with the 183rd and 185th Divisions, and the two cavalry divisions, in its wake. The following day the panzers, along with the 900th Lehr Brigade, began crossing the bridge they had seized over the Volga, as the first stage of a grandiose plan to link up with Army Group North through the Valdai Hills, which would encircle Northwestern Front. This plan not only disregarded the continuing resistance of Red Army forces, but also the state of the roads and the logistical shoestring the German forces were operating on. The latter was worsened when the 21st Tank Brigade launched a surprise raid on the supply lines south of the city on October 17.

At 0600 hours the same day, 1st Panzer and 900th Lehr began their drive up the Kalinin–Torzhok road and made steady progress through the morning. At noon the headquarters of XXXXI Corps recorded that there was a possibility of capturing the bridge at Mednoye, crossing the Tvertsa River about 28 km from Kalinin and nearly halfway to Torzhok; this headquarters was only vaguely aware that the 183rd was advancing from Torzhok. In the event, not only was the bridge taken but the panzer column pressed on to the village of Marino, 14 km farther along. Only a depleted tank regiment of 8th Tank Brigade was providing any resistance before being withdrawn to the northeast, uncovering the road. Once he learned of this, Konev "hit the ceiling" and demanded Rotmistrov's arrest for cowardice. Vatutin chose to send Rotmistrov a blistering order, stating:

Immediately, without losing a single hour, return from Likhoslavl, and with parts of 185th Rifle Division, rapidly strike at Mednoye to destroy the group of enemy that have broken through and seize Mednoye. It is time to finish with the cowardice!

Later in the day, Maj. Dr. J. Eckinger, the commander of 1st Panzer's advance detachment, was killed while leading his troops in an effort to outflank Rotmistrov's tanks. This death symbolically marked the end of the advance on Torzhok.

=== Battle for the Torzhok Road ===
By the evening the forces that the Soviet command had envisioned to reverse this German advance were moving into place. The 183rd Division had already moved through Torzhok, and its leading elements were fighting in the Marino area. The 185th took up positions about 16 km north of Mednoye, with the two cavalry divisions ahead. Altogether, Vatutin's Group consisted of about 20,000 men, 200 guns and mortars, and twenty operational tanks. Its opponents had far fewer men, strung out over 54 km of road, low on fuel and ammunition, and partly encircled. Vatutin gave orders for a general attack at dawn on October 18; the 183rd was to advance on Mednoye straight down the road from Torzhok. Although the 133rd Rifle Division's attack northeast of Kalinin cut the road at its base early on, the pressure of the 183rd's forward elements against 900th Lehr at Marino was described as "light". On the same day Vatutin's Group came under command of 31st Army. In his evening report to STAVKA, Konev stated that the 183rd was "marching on Torzhok" when in fact it had already passed that place; this was flatly false, as were many other statements in this document.

By 0800 hours on October 19 the XXXXI Corps reported that the situation of 1st Panzer was "critical"; it and 900th Lehr would be forced to abandon Marino. General Komissarov's men, along with the Separate Motorized Rifle Brigade, were now putting steady pressure on Lehr. By evening the German command decided it was necessary to abandon its deepest penetration toward Torzhok. The brigade was to assemble near Gorodnya, 28 km to the southeast and south of the Torzhok road. The situation at Mednoye is more obscure. Vatutin's orders to the 185th were as follows:

185th Rifle Division and 8th Tank Brigade will forced march by dawn 19.10 to get to the area of Likhoslavl, Ilinskoye, Ivantsevo, from there make a rapid strike on Mednoye, the objective, working closely with 183rd Rifle Division, to destroy the enemy west of Mednoye not allowing him to withdraw from the attack of 183rd Rifle Division to the east. Going further, building on the success, by the end of the day take Poddubke.

None of this can be reconciled with the records of 1st Panzer, which state: "Also on the evening of 19 October, the division does not want to give up Mjednoje [Mednoye] yet, since the enemy is not active there, and reconnaissance reports the area 5-8km around as free of the enemy."

Overnight on October 19/20, Vatutin prepared his final orders to his Group. These orders, which may have never actually been issued, called for the 185th and 8th Tanks to finish off all German forces in the Mednoye area before the entire Group advanced across the Volga all the way to the western tip of the Moscow Sea. This was part of an impractical plan intended to fulfil Konev's earlier "large solution" of encircling all of XXXXI Corps, but it appears from the lack of an order number and time of issue that it was never implemented. Instead, Konev placed the 183rd and the 54th Cavalry into Front reserve and ordered them to move to a point between Torzhok and Staritsa to support 22nd Army and the right flank of 29th Army. During October 21 some remnants of 1st Panzer managed to escape the pocket, after destroying all their vehicles except the tanks, and the pocketed forces were within 3 km of Kalinin, being supported by shuttle flights of Ju 87 dive bombers to keep the Soviet forces at bay. The next day the remaining survivors got back across the Volga, minus most of their vehicles. German sources state that from October 13 to 18 the 1st Panzer and 900th Lehr suffered a total of 457 casualties, while over the next two days 1st Panzer alone lost an additional 501 men; the 900th also took substantial losses during the latter period. The battle for the Torzhok road would mark the first permanent liberation of Soviet territory during the war. On October 27 the forces of Army Group North that were intending to meet up with XXXXI Corps to encircle Northwestern Front were compelled to withdraw across the Volkhov River.

German 9th Army had taken the town of Rzhev on October 14 and since then had been slowly advancing north against 22nd Army. This put pressure on Konev's right flank and could have led to the loss of Torzhok from another direction. To begin with he moved the 183rd and the Separate Motorized Rifle Brigade to backstop 22nd Army which had been badly weakened in previous fighting, with some divisions down to 500 - 1,500 men. It appears that Konev was unsure if this was an adequate precaution and hedged his bets by retaining the 185th Division as a Front asset. By October 24 the 183rd had been incorporated into the 29th Army in order to form its right wing along with 54th Cavalry and the 243rd Rifle Division. These units took up positions along the north bank of the Tma River from Kunganovo to the town of Nesterovo on the Volga.

== Battles of Rzhev ==
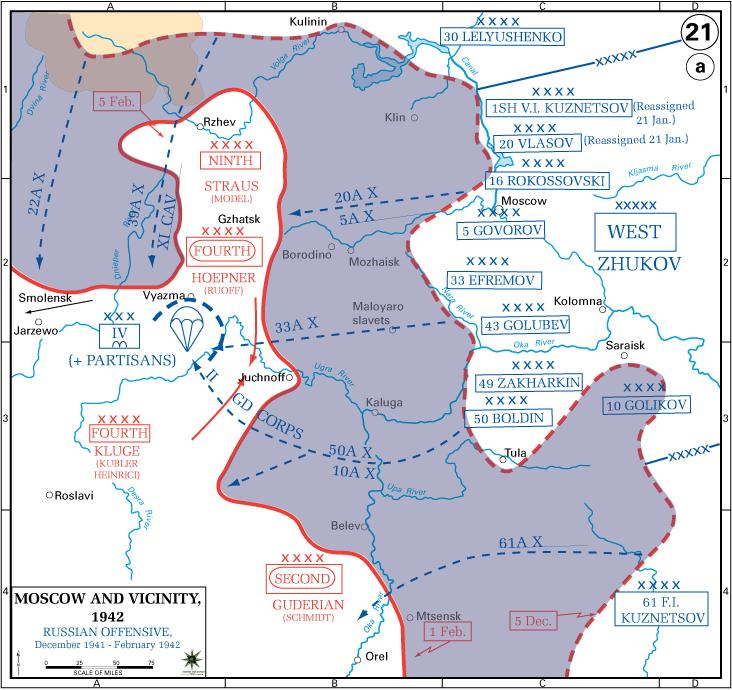
Rzhev salient 1941-1942

The positions of 29th Army were outside the scope of the final German offensive on Moscow in November, as well as the early phase of the Soviet counteroffensive. During December the 183rd was moved to 39th Army, still in Kalinin Front, but returned to the 29th in January 1942.

The first Rzhev-Vyazma offensive began on January 8, based on a directive from the STAVKA of the previous day, which stated the objective "to encircle, and then capture or destroy the enemy's entire Mozhaysk–Gzhatsk–Viaz'ma grouping". Kalinin Front's right wing would attack from northwest of Rzhev toward Sychyovka and Vyazma. Within days the forces of 29th Army were moving to encircle Rzhev from the west, reaching as close as 8 km to the city by January 11. The STAVKA ordered General Konev that it be taken the following day, but despite reinforcements the effort fell short. After the war, P. O. Bystrov, a former company commander in the 183rd, recounted the fight around this date for the village of Pekhurovo, some 9 km west of Rzhev. Following the first attack the company was reduced to six men remaining:

In the morning we were given support from a battalion of ski troops, which had 15 machine guns. Yet once again our attack was repulsed. I remained with four Red Army men, but the order had to be fulfilled. I searched out the ski troop commander and suggested moving around the village that night and breaking into it from the rear. Leaving behind a covering force, that night we skirted around the village and stealthily approached some outlying buildings on the other side. There a German patrol spotted us and opened fire, but it was too late. We rushed into the street and employed our bayonets. Everything became jumbled. There was the thrust of bayonets, pistols fired, and exploding grenades... By dawn the company had taken a defense beyond the village. The Germans threw tanks against Pekhurovo. Our guys retreated, but that same night we drove the Germans back out of the village, though now there was nothing left of it but ashes.

On January 21–22 the German forces southwest and west of Vyazma went over to the attack. The immediate aim was to free the German troops encircled in the Olenino area and the close the gap through which supplies were flowing to 29th and 39th Armies and the 11th Cavalry Corps. The gap was closed on January 23 and the two armies now had only a narrow corridor between Nelidovo and Bely for communications with the Front. Realizing the danger of the situation Konev ordered 30th Army westward to attempt to reopen the gap. By the end of the month the 183rd was close to starvation, with its rifle regiments reduced to only 45-60 men each.

Further German attacks on February 5 broke communications between 39th and 29th Armies and the latter was now completely encircled. 30th Army made repeated efforts to break through the German defenses near Nozhkino and Kokoshkino; at times only 3–4 km remained to reach the encircled units, which were striving to break out to the north. By mid-month Konev had ordered the 29th Army commander, Maj. Gen. V. I. Shvetsov, "to withdraw in the general direction of Stupino", to the southwest toward 39th Army. He was further ordered "to bring out the troops in an organized fashion; if it is impossible to bring out the artillery, heavy machine guns and mortars, to bury such equipment in the woods." The units of 29th Army began to trickle out of encirclement to link up with 39th Army on the night of February 17; at the same time some 500 paratroopers were dropped into the pocket to assist in the rescue. Going into the fight immediately they allowed time for the survivors to regroup. By now all the command and support troops of the division were fighting as infantry. By February 28, 5,200 men had come out of the 29th Army pocket, 800 of which were wounded. The Army's losses between January 16 and February 28 amounted to 14,000 men.

One of the last groups to attempt to escape was led by General Komissarov. On March 2 it ran into a large German force and suffered heavy losses, including the general, who was killed. He was replaced by Maj. Pyotr Konstantinovich Ruban, who had been serving as both the division's deputy commander and chief of staff. He was in turn replaced on March 19 by Lt. Col. Aleksandr Stepanovich Kostitsyn and went back to his former duties. Kostitsyn was an NKVD officer who had previously led the 910th Rifle Regiment of the 243rd Division. On May 11 he was seriously wounded and evacuated. His replacement was Maj. Mikhail Georgievich Fedosenko, but this officer would in turn be replaced on June 24 by Lt. Col. Ivan Ivanovich Yaremenko.

In May and June, Army Group Center began planning a limited offensive to eliminate the smaller Soviet salients to its rear. Operation Seydlitz was mainly directed against 39th Army and 11th Cavalry Corps, and although several units of 29th Army were also encircled again the much-reduced 183rd remained on the defense northeast of Rzhev into late July. At about this time it was transferred to 30th Army, still in Kalinin Front. The First Rzhev–Sychyovka Offensive Operation began on July 30, but the Front's forces quickly became bogged down in the fighting north of Rzhev due to frequent thunderstorms. On August 21, Lt. Col. Yaremenko left the division, and Col. Ivan Afanasevich Ilichin replaced him for 24 hours before Ruban, who had been promoted to lieutenant colonel, again took the reins. At about the same time the division was moved back to 29th Army, now in Western Front, and on September 16 it left the fighting front to join 3rd Reserve Army in the Reserve of the Supreme High Command for an extensive period of rebuilding. On October 2, Kostitsyn returned to command of the division with the rank of major general after a brief stint leading the 172nd Rifle Division, and Lt. Col. Ruban again went back to his duties as deputy commander.

=== Move to the South ===
The 183rd remained in 3rd Reserve Army into January 1943, when it was reassigned to Voronezh Front as a reinforcement. In the planning for the Ostrogozhsk–Rossosh offensive the division was to serve as a second echelon behind the shock group of the 18th Rifle Corps which was under direct command of the Front. As of January 10 it was still en route by rail from the Moscow area. The STAVKA was determined to defeat the Axis forces (primarily the 2nd Hungarian Army and remnants of Italian 8th Army) operating along the Voronezh–Kursk and Kharkov axes. The first task was to crush the forces defending the area of Ostrogozhsk and Rossosh, which would primarily involve forces of Voronezh Front. The 18th Corps' assault began on January 14, and rapidly broke through the Hungarian forces that it faced. By January 18 the bulk of the Axis forces had been encircled, before the 183rd had reached the front, but it took part in the latter stages of the elimination of those forces, which continued until January 27. By January 24 the division had been assigned to the Front's 40th Army, which was under command of Lt. Gen. K. S. Moskalenko.

== Voronezh–Kastornoye Offensive ==
In the planning for the next stage of the winter offensive Moskalenko chose to attack on a wide frontage of 50 km, from Semidesyatskoye to 2nd Gorodishche, with the objectives of Dmitrievka, Gorshechnoye, and Kastornoye. He deployed his infantry forces in two echelons; being a relatively fresh unit the 183rd was in the first, along with four other divisions, a rifle brigade and two tank brigades. The 183rd had 21 T-34 tanks of the 192nd Tank Brigade in direct support. On the first day, January 24, the attackers were to advance 20–25 km, followed by 10–15 km the next day, and on January 27 the division and the 129th Rifle Brigade, supported by the 4th Tank Corps, were to reach the area of Kastornoye. At this point it was to link up with units of 13th Army and complete the encirclement. The Axis defense was based on a chain of village strongpoints with heavy minefields, while the gaps were swept by firepower. It quickly became apparent that Moskalenko was lacking in artillery to suppress these strongpoints.

=== Battle for Sinie Lipiagi ===
40th Army was to carry the main weight of the Front's attack. The attack frontages of its first echelon divisions were between 6–12 km; the 183rd was deployed across 7 km on the Army's right flank. The assault was to be preceded by a 30-minute artillery preparation, plus a total of 200 45mm antitank guns and 76mm regimental guns firing over open sights. However, after the exertions of the previous offensive, all the Soviet forces were experiencing shortages of ammunition. In an effort to confuse the defenders the offensive began in staggered fashion, with 40th Army attacking first, 60th Army the following day, and the 13th and 38th Armies kicking off on January 26. On the opening day 40th Army launched its assault in strong blizzard conditions. The artillery preparation was delayed in the hope that visibility would improve, but finally went ahead at 1230 hours. Under the circumstances the Axis losses were insignificant, and no air support was available. The following infantry assault made little progress, although 4th Tank Corps did better, effectively crushing the 68th Infantry Division and gaining 6–8 km. The 183rd ran into particularly stubborn resistance from the 196th Regiment of the 57th Infantry Division at Sinie Lipiagi and ground to a halt, before eventually advancing 2–3 km.

On January 25, the weather turned fair and sunny, giving the promise of air support and more accurate artillery fire. The 183rd was still tied down in the fighting for Sinie Lipiagi, and was unable to cover the left flank of the 25th Guards Rifle Division as it made a rapid advance. On the same day, German forces withdrew from Voronezh, falling back toward Kastornoye. Moskalenko was ordered to cut their lines of retreat. The 183rd worked its way around Sinie Lipiagi from the west during the afternoon and by the end of the day had reached a line from height 214 to Novaya Derevnya to Khvoshchevatovka but the 196th Regiment continued to hold. As a result, the division, along with the 129th Rifle Brigade and four regiments of artillery, were all drawn into the battle for this village. By the end of the day the gap between the 183rd and 25th Guards had grown to 6 km.

Moskalenko's orders for January 26 directed his right flank forces to redirect their axes of attack to the north. The 183rd was to move toward Glotovo and Vyaznovatka. The 129th Brigade screened Sinie Lipiagi from the east and fended off several counterattacks. The 183rd also had to deal with counterattacks from up to two battalions supported by artillery. Combat in the area of Novaya Derevnya and on height 214 went on into the afternoon and as a result the division barely advanced, reaching the Khvoshchevatovka State Farm with its left flank by day's end. Gradually, up to half of the 57th Infantry was gradually being worn down to remnants, but the two Soviet units were unable to complete an encirclement. Meanwhile, the remainder of 40th Army was also struggling to complete its mission. Meanwhile, air reconnaissance showed increasing movement of trucks along the roads from Voronezh to Kastornoye, while other forces loaded onto trains. By nightfall the corridor available for the Axis troops to escape encirclement was about 60 km wide.

On January 27, the 4th Tank Corps attacked at dawn in the direction of Kastornoye, having received fuel by air the previous day. By the end of the day its forward detachment captured Kastornaya Novaya station, cutting the Axis lines of retreat to the southwest. The 183rd and 129th Brigade had by now encircled Sinie Lipyagi and screened it off, allowing their main forces to advance to the line Glazovo–Pershino–Reshetovka. The division's lack of progress can be explained in part by the lagging advance of its artillery; 4th Antitank Battalion was still in the Pervomaiskoe area and the 623rd Artillery Regiment was as much as 15 km away from the rifle regiments. Lacking this essential firepower it was impossible to overcome the resistance of 57th Infantry. In turn, the German force was unable to break out to the north, despite repeated attempts. The following day, elements of 13th and 38th Armies broke into Kastornoye and the town was largely taken by the morning of January 29. Meanwhile, the 183rd attempted to attack Yasenki but encountered powerful artillery and machine gun fire and was unable to advance. It then took a new approach through Dubratnoe and a grove of trees to the west and made some progress. Despite this, by the end of January 28 the gap with 25th Guards had reached 15–18 km.

At this time there were up to eight German and two Hungarian divisions operating southeast of Kastornoye. While loosely encircled, it would require considerable time and effort to defeat them. On January 30 the STAVKA decided to leave this task mostly to 38th Army while the remainder of Voronezh Front's forces began to advance on Kharkiv and Kursk. This set a complicated task for the Front's right wing units, including the 183rd. Kostitsyn was ordered to close the gap and to reach a line from Olym to Alisovo station in cooperation with 303rd Rifle Division. Moskalenko was warned: "If the 40th Army allows the encircled enemy to break through its zone to the west, it will foil the front's operation. The encircled enemy group of forces must be held and destroyed." In the afternoon of January 29 Sinie Lipyagi had finally been taken after heavy fighting. The next day the 303rd Division encircled Nizhnedevitsk and, with the help of the 183rd and the 129th Brigade, eliminated its garrison, a total of 3,000 Axis soldiers. The 183rd continued with its main forces and the 129th Tanks to Yasenki, which was stubbornly defended. Two counterattacks from Kuchugury and Kulevka in regimental strength forced the division to take up a defense along a line from Dubratnoe to Somovka.

=== Advance on Kursk ===
The position of the 25th Guards remained precarious, despite reinforcements, as Axis forces gathered to break out on its sector. The 183rd and 129th Brigade remained fighting on a line from Gusevka to Yasenki on January 31 while the 303rd moved to relieve the 25th Guards, not soon enough to prevent a breakthrough by the 88th Infantry Division at Gorshechnoe in the direction of Stary Oskol. Some 30,000-35,000 Axis troops remained encircled east of Gorshechnoe, and by the end of the day the 183rd and four other rifle divisions and one brigade of 38th and 40th Armies were attempting to eliminate them, an unequal task. During February 1 the division and 129th Brigade remained fighting on the Gusevka–Yasenki line, although during the afternoon Kostitsyn was able to attack Gorshechnoe with one rifle regiment in an effort to assist 25th Guards. On February 2 the 40th Army was scheduled to begin its advance on Kharkiv, but this had to be delayed to the next day.

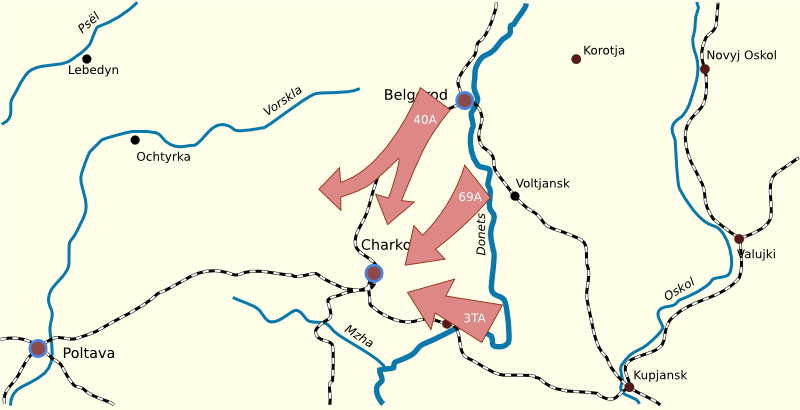
Operation Star

The German command decided to commence the withdrawal of its encircled forces from Gorshechnoe to the southwest and west overnight on February 1/2, in three independent groups. During February 2 the 183rd and the 129th Brigade continued battling with rearguards along much the same lines as previously. The only effective assistance the 25th Guards received was from 4th Tank Corps. At about this time the 183rd was ordered to break off the encirclement battle and join the advance. This made immediate progress against limited opposition, and at dawn on February 6 a forward detachment of the division, led by Cpt. A. I. Tkachev, liberated the railroad station at Prokhorovka in a decisive attack.

As the advance continued the commander of the 227th Rifle Regiment distinguished himself in battle. Maj. Enver Bimbolatovich Akhsarov was Ossetian by nationality. He had been drafted into the Red Army in 1934, graduated from officer training in Tbilisi in 1937, and had been in the fighting since the German invasion. He was noted as managing his regiment well during the advance, overcoming several German strongpoints. On February 15 the 227th was counterattacked by superior forces, but these were thrown back under Akhsarov's leadership. In the third attack he personally killed two attackers, but was soon killed himself by the explosion of a mortar round. He was buried in Kharkiv. On January 10, 1944, he was posthumously made a Hero of the Soviet Union.

On February 19 Army Group South, under command of Field Marshal von Manstein, launched a counterattack against Southwestern Front, which was overextended after an advance almost to the Dniepr River, and drove it back to the Northern Donets River with heavy losses. After regrouping, Manstein's forces struck Voronezh Front, retaking Kharkiv on March 16 and Belgorod two days later before halting. 3rd Tank Army had been encircled and destroyed; 40th and 69th Armies nearly suffered the same fate. The spring rasputitsa brought operations to a halt as both sides prepared for offensives in the summer. During March the 183rd came under direct command of the Front, and in April it was transferred to 69th Army, which was commanded by Lt. Gen. V. D. Kryuchyonkin.

== Battle of Kursk ==
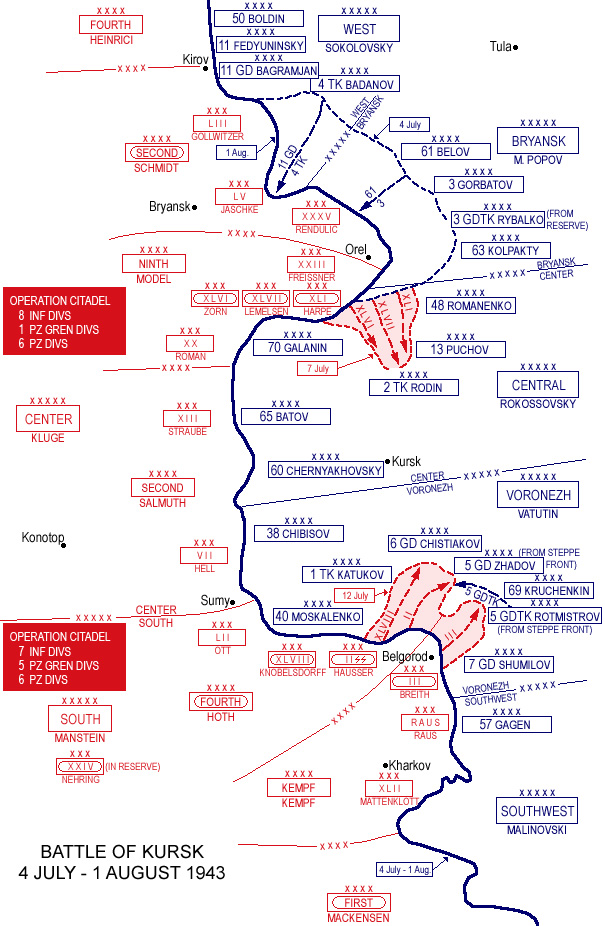
Battle of Kursk. Note position of 69th Army.

During this lull in the fighting the division was substantially rebuilt. On June 30 the 285th Rifle Regiment reported a strength of 1,748 personnel, armed with 878 rifles and carbines, 41 PPSh-41 submachine guns, 43 light machine guns, 17 heavy machine guns, eight 50mm mortars, 23 82mm mortars, five 120mm mortars, six 45mm antitank guns, four 76mm antitank guns, and 54 antitank rifles.

As an indication of the many casualties the 183rd had suffered, by the beginning of July there was no notable number of Latvians remaining. The personnel were noted as being 60 percent Turkmen, 15 percent Russians, and 25 percent of various other nationalities. At about this time the division was grouped into the 48th Rifle Corps with the 305th and 107th Rifle Divisions. 69th Army constituted the Front reserve and so was in second echelon on a sector from Olkhovatka to Yefremovka, with its headquarters at Korocha. Even in rear echelon, where it was intended to backstop the boundary between 6th and 7th Guards Armies, Kryuchyonkin had directed his troops to construct extensive fortifications. This included seven antitank strongpoints in the 183rd's sector alone, each containing six to twelve antitank guns with wide fields of fire, plus roughly the same number of antitank riflemen and a platoon of submachine gunners.

The German offensive against the Kursk salient began on July 5. 4th Panzer Army made some progress against 6th Guards Army in its initial attack and at 1940 hours the Front commander, N. F. Vatutin, now an army general, ordered the 93rd Guards Rifle Division to move to the Prokhorovka area behind the 183rd, further backstopping the boundary. During July 6 the 51st Guards Rifle Division was savaged by the II SS Panzer Corps, losing over half its strength by the following day. 2nd SS Panzer Division Das Reich had penetrated the forward defenses and was moving in the direction of Prokhorovka. The 285th Rifle Regiment was defending in positions around the Komsomolets State Farm and Teterevino, about 9 km southwest of the town. A report filed by the regiment two days later stated in part:

1. The enemy with up to 130 tanks and air support at 1800 6.07.43 approached our forward edge of the main defensive belt. At 1630, a group of 10 tanks had managed to infiltrate in the sector of the 4th Rifle Company along the road leading from Tererevino to Ivanovskii Vyselok. The cause of the enemy tank breakthrough was as follows: the enemy was closely following the retreating vehicles and tanks of the 6th Guards Army's 51st and 52nd Guards Rifle Divisions, which prevented the possibility to block the road... with anti-tank mines.
The 10 tanks approached the edge of the woods south of the Komsomolets State Farm. Our anti-tank artillery knocked out 2 tanks; the remainder returned to the region of Hill 258.2 and fought their way down the communication trenches of the 4th Rifle Company, as a result of which part of the 4th Rifle Company was crushed or shot up by the tanks, and part retreated to the 1st and 3rd Battalions. Up to 70 tanks with groups of submachine gunners engaged our 3rd and 5th Rifle Companies. On the night of 6 to 7.07.43, the enemy shelled and placed rifle and machine-gun fire [on our positions], simultaneously conducting a reconnaissance of the 3rd Rifle Company's right flank, which was repulsed.
As a result, from 1800 6.07.43 until the dawn of 7.07.43, 6 enemy tanks were destroyed and up to 30 of their infantry.

This fight was assessed by General Kostitsyn's headquarters as an "extraordinary occurrence", indicating anything from a disaster to an unexpected event. While the regiment's defenses had been built according to plan, the removable roadblocks along the road had not been replaced after the passage of the retreating vehicles. Five officers, including the commander of 2nd Battalion, Sen. Lt. Sedov, were placed under investigation.

=== Battle for Prokhorovka ===
The division's headquarters filed an Extraordinary Combat Report regarding the confused fighting on July 8

At 1600 8.07.43, the command post of 285th Rifle Regiment heard the noise of engines from Prokhorovka Station in the direction of Point 241.6. Tanks were moving, which deployed into combat formation and opened heavy cannon fire on our combat positions... Advancing in the direction of Vasil'evka, the [Soviet] tanks set alight several buildings with their fire and left one tank of the 10th Tank Corps... burning. Later these same tanks poured fire on the positions of the 1st Rifle Battalion... and began to crush the fighting men in the trenches beneath their tracks, especially in the 3rd and 5th Rifle Companies...
The tanks were moving without any oversight, and failing to observe a combat formation and order. The command of the 285th Rifle Regiment tried to explain the situation to the tankers, but they continued to fire upon our combat positions...
As Captain Piniuk, chief of staff of the 99th Tank Brigade informed us, the commander of the 2nd Tank Corps, Major General Popov, personally gave the order for the brigade's attack: '... the enemy is located in the region of Andreevka, Vasil'evka, Kozlovka, and Gerznoe.' And they were acting in accordance with their assigned order.
According to incomplete information, elements of the regiment have losses from the fire of their own tanks: 25 men killed, 37 wounded.

During the evening a decision was made to reinforce the defenses in the area Ivanovka–Leski–Belenikhino. At 2200 hours Kryuchyonkin was directed to redeploy elements of the 183rd's left flank from the Army's rear zone to the rail line from Komsomolets State Farm to Yasnaya Polyana to Teretevino, allowing units of 5th Guards Tank Corps to be relieved.

On July 9, Vatutin's concern was focused on blocking all German progress toward Oboyan and strengthening the defense of Prokhorovka. The 5th Guards Tank Corps, badly battered in the earlier fighting, was moved toward the former place, turning its sector over to elements of the 183rd. By the morning of July 10 a combination of units from 6th Guards and 69th Armies were facing the three divisions of II SS Corps. The Psel River formed the boundary between the two Armies. The positions of the 285th Regiment and the 11th Motorized Rifle Brigade lay in front of Das Reich and the 1st SS Panzer Division Leibstandarte on a sector from Vasilevka to the Molozhavaia gully to Komsomolets State Farm to Ivanovskii Vyselok to Storozhevoe. The 285th was backed by the remaining dug-in tanks of 2nd Tank Corps. The Corps had 116 tanks, a combination of T-34s, T-70s, and Churchills.

==== Fighting on July 10 ====
By this time, von Manstein had given up on breaking through to Oboyan and was determined to make a last effort to break through by reaching Prokhorovka and encircling 69th Army in cooperation with III Panzer Corps on the left. Before sunrise, a diversionary group of "Vlasovites" (Russian volunteers under German command) in Red Army uniform struck the outposts of the 285th Regiment, permitting sappers of 1st SS Panzer to clear breaches in the regiment's minefields for tanks. Leibstandarte began its operations early in the morning, as reported by Kostitsyn's headquarters:

At 0700 up to a company of enemy infantry with the support of five tanks launched an attack on the 1st and 2nd Rifle Companies of the 285th Rifle Regiment. The attack was beaten back.
From 0600 to 0930, groups of enemy aircraft, numbering between 20 and 25 Ju 88 bombers escorted by 10 to 15 Me 109 fighters, constantly worked over the areas of the 1st and 2nd Battalions... through both dive bombing and even more so by level bombing from altitude. The hostile aviation didn't show any particular activity over other areas, with the exception of solitary reconnaissance planes.

Observing all indications, Kryuchyonkin concluded that the SS divisions were preparing for a drive to capture Prokhorovka Station. He therefore ordered 2nd Tanks to counterstrike toward Greznoe and Kochetovka to pin them in place.

Leibstandarte began its assault at 1045 hours. Two battalions of 2nd Panzergrenadier Regiment attacked the positions of 285th Regiment, with the I Battalion moving toward the southwest outskirts of Komsomolets State Farm and II Battalion advancing along the Tererevino–Ivanovskii Vyselok road toward the bend in the railroad. III Battalion had assembled in Teterevino mounted on armored halftracks in reserve, prepared to move into any gap in the defenses. The State Farm was the key to the defense and was held by the 1st Battalion of the 285th Regiment with support from 2nd Battalion of 623rd Artillery Regiment. These defenders were able to fight off the attack. Meanwhile, the 2nd Battalion on the sector from the State Farm to Ivanovskii Vyselok had its first line of defenses penetrated after a fight lasting about an hour. However, the SS troops were unable to progress farther, due to heavy fire from the second echelon, consisting of the 169th Tank Brigade, 1502nd Destroyer Antitank Artillery Regiment, and the 269th Mortar Regiment. A large number of the Battalion's men consolidated again near Ivanovskii Vyselok, where its headquarters was located. During the early afternoon the II Battalion scored a success at the State Farm, driving the 1st Battalion from its line of trenches, which allowed Leibstandarte to move its reconnaissance battalion into the gap to guard the left flank of II Battalion.

As of 1300 hours the two panzergrenadier battalions, supported by the entire artillery regiment of Leibstandarte, plus its company of Tigers and its assault gun battalion, pushed forward to the approaches of Hill 241.6. At this point the reconnaissance battalion swung around to attack the rear of the 1st and 2nd Battalions of the 285th Regiment, plus the 371st Battalion of 169th Tanks, holding a patch of woods to the north of the State Farm. Following a battle that had lasted four hours the headquarters of Leibstandarte reported: "The well dug-in enemy defended desperately, but after the capture of their positions, the resistance weakened. Numerous Russians began fleeing the field." The remaining soldiers of 1st Battalion, individually or in small groups, pulled back to 99th Tank Brigade's defense sector in Vasilevka, while 2nd Battalion was scattered. Staff officers moved to rally and re-assemble men who were in retreat toward Prokhorovka Station. The SS advance also smashed the line of the regiment's 3rd Battalion. It pulled out of Ivanovskii Vyselok, along with 169th Tanks, toward Storozhevoe. Altogether, the defenses along the approaches to the Station had been seriously disrupted, and now Das Reich attempted to pierce the defense near Storozhevoe Forest and break through to Iamki.

In response to this crisis, the chief of staff of 48th Corps dispatched a message to General Popov, the commander of 2nd Tank Corps:

1. The enemy with a force of up to a regiment of infantry and the support of 50 tanks... attacked and broke through the forward edge of the 183rd Rifle Division's 285th Rifle Regiment, and is developing this success in the direction of Ivanovskii Vyselok and Storozhevoe.
2. I request the assistance of a counterattack with one tank brigade. I ask you to arrange the tank brigade's jumping-off position and the time of the attack with the commander of the 183rd Rifle Division...

The closest formation to the crisis point was the 26th Tank Brigade. Since July 8 its vehicles had been dug in on a line from Mikhailovka to the Stalinskoe Branch of the Oktiabrskii State Farm. Popov ordered the brigade to advance to Hill 241.6. Meanwhile, Leibstandarte had been brought to a halt by the second echelon forces, particularly the antitank units and various reserves, after crossing the Komsomolets State Farm. The fighting generally subsided by 2100, although it continued until around midnight in the Storozhevoe area. During the afternoon, the commander of the 227th Rifle Regiment, Maj. V. E. Sazhinov, was directed to relocate his unit:

... I received an order from the division commander to withdraw the regiment with the onset of darkness to a previous sector of defense. Approximately 0200 in the morning of 11 July, having completed a 20-kilometre march, the regiments battalions had already begun to settle into their defensive positions, when suddenly a new order arrived: to continue the march and by morning take up the defensive sector of the 285th Rifle Regiment southwest of Prokhorovka.
Very little time remained, and we were compelled to move at a forced march in order to reach the position before dawn. Exerting all efforts, the regiment hastened to carry out its assigned order. Nevertheless, dawn caught us as we were approaching the 285th Rifle Regiment's sector of defense, but fortunately, there was a dense fog that morning, and a light drizzle began to fall. By 0500 on the morning of 11 July, the 227th Rifle Regiment, having completed a 28- to 30-kilometre forced march... took up a defensive position straddling the Belgorod-Prokhorovka rail line in the vicinity of First of May State Farm, or the Stalinskoe Branch of the [Oktiabr'skii] State Farm, to the right of a projection of woods and further - the highway.

Sazhinov went on to describe the artillery support available to him, which was substantial.

==== Fighting on July 11 ====
Army Group South attacked toward Prokhorovka from two directions on July 11. II SS Corps drove from the west while III Panzer Corps continued to progress from the south. At 0830 hours the right flank units of the 183rd and 2nd Tanks came under attack from a group of 50 tanks, with 200 aircraft in support. The division's operational summary, timestamped 1300 hours, stated:

... at 0700 in the region of Storozhevoe and the Stalinskoe Branch of the [Oktiabr'skii] State Farm, 20 to 25 enemy Ju 88 bombers escorted by a small group of fighters made a level bombing run... Altogether by 1300, 250 sorties have been registered.
According to reconnaissance reports, the adversary has set up a screen on the line Kalinin, Petrovskii with units of the Reich and Adolph Hitler divisions, facing east, and is trying to break through with his main forces in the direction of Prokhorovka. The operation of up to 130 enemy tanks has been established in the region of Teterevino, Ivanovskii Vyselok, and the Komsomolets State Farm.
For the purpose of blocking the further advance of enemy infantry and tanks, the entire 227th [Rifle] Regiment has been deployed behind and within the defensive areas of the 2nd and 3rd Rifle Battalions of the 285th Rifle Regiment. With the exception of one battalion, which remained in the previous position, the 285th Rifle Regiment has moved into the area of Vinogradovka's outskirts and taken up defensive positions there.

Cpt. S. I. Chernyshev, commander of the 3rd Battalion of the 623rd Artillery, recalled that just at first light his observer on duty reported that "some sort of new settlement has sprung up" on German-held ground. Hurrying to the stereoscope, Chernyshev did make out "the vague outlines of some sort of structures... through the thick shroud of morning mist" at a range of 6–7 km. As the mist cleared it became apparent that these were, in fact, dozens of tanks, halftracks, and other vehicles.

The main German attack struck the flanks of these positions; on the left the woods at Storozhevoe and the Stalinskoe Branch of the [Oktiabr'skii] State Farm, held by the 169th Tanks, the 58th Motorized Rifle Brigade, and the 227th Regiment. This was an effort to stifle the flanking fire of Soviet artillery that had stymied the advance on Prokhorovka the day before. Major Sazhinov recalled that the attack included Tigers as well as roughly 140 more armored vehicles, and that the advance was hesitant, with frequent halts to fire main armament, indicating that camouflage was effectively hiding the defenders' positions. Their signal to fire would be a salvo of Katyusha rockets. Sazhinov directed his men to direct their fire at the German infantry behind the armor. The intense fire from all weapons continued for about five minutes, leaving ten tanks burning, including several Tigers, plus more than two dozen other vehicles; the surviving infantry had gone to ground. Losses to the 227th were "insignificant". Through the rest of the day it held its ground in the face of six more attacks, although its own losses began to mount.

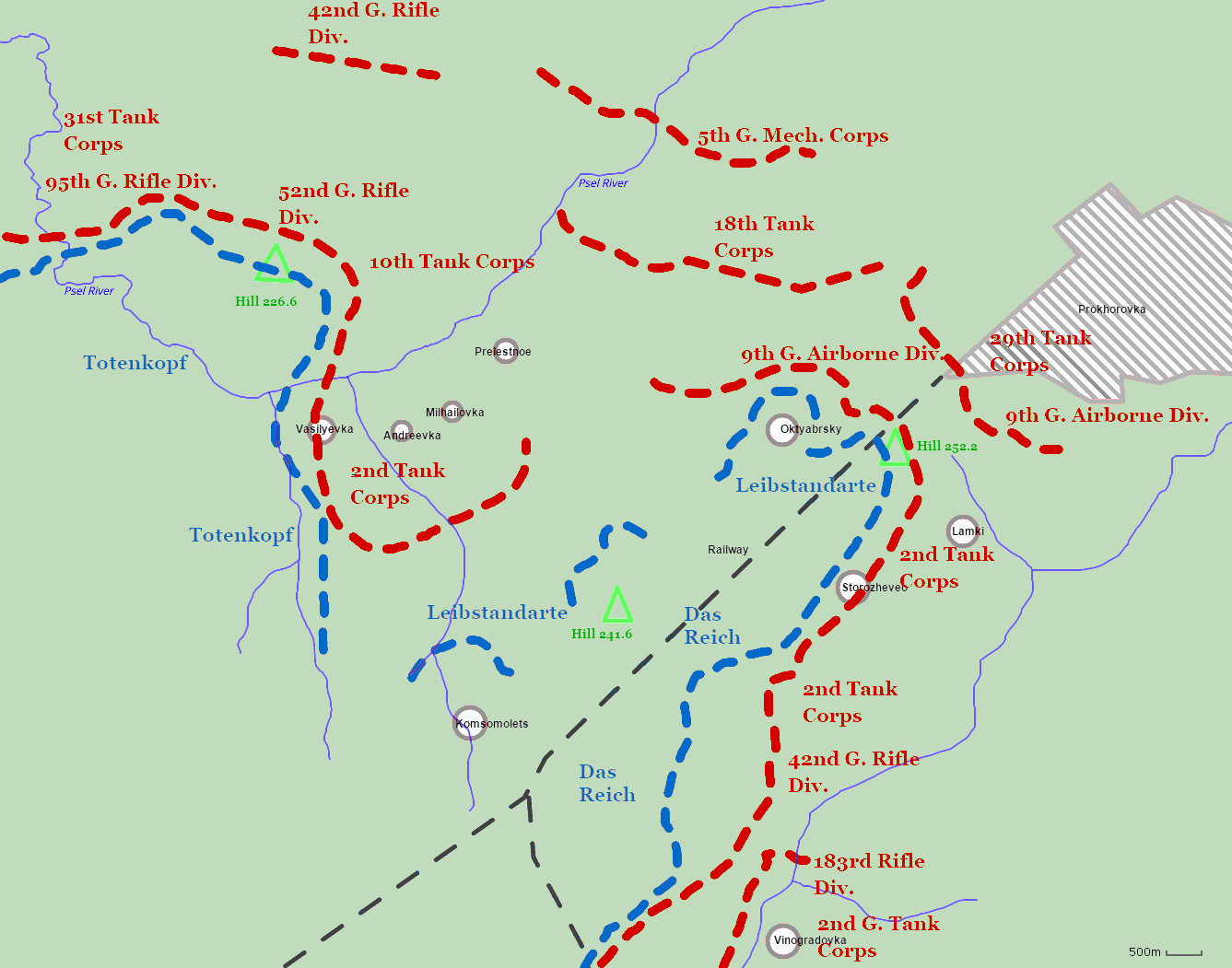
Situation near Prokhorovka, night of July 11. Note position of the 183rd.

Sazhinov further stated that after an eighth attack late in the day German tanks had driven a wedge deep into the 227th's positions along the railroad embankment. In a ninth attack several vehicles reached the regimental command post, cutting communications to the battalions and companies, and forcing the observation post to be abandoned. Sazhinov's chief of staff, Cpt. A. P. Sokolov, and other staff officers were able to quickly withdraw to a new post after dark, restore communications and control, pull units back where necessary, and make the regiment combat effective again despite significant losses. The commander of the 285th Regiment, Maj. A. K. Karpov, was forced to combine his 1st and 2nd Battalions into a composite battalion due to the losses over the previous days. By midnight the heavy fighting had subsided. Late in the day the III Panzer Corps had penetrated the boundary between 48th Corps and the 35th Guards Rifle Corps, which was also part of 69th Army. At dawn on July 12 the 6th Panzer Division captured the villages of Rzhavets, Vypolzovka and Ryndinka, threatening 48th Corps with partial encirclement. Meanwhile, after a long approach march, the leading brigades of 5th Guards Tank Army's 18th and 29th Tank Corps were closing on the positions of II SS Corps just south of Prokhorovka.

==== Fighting on July 12 ====
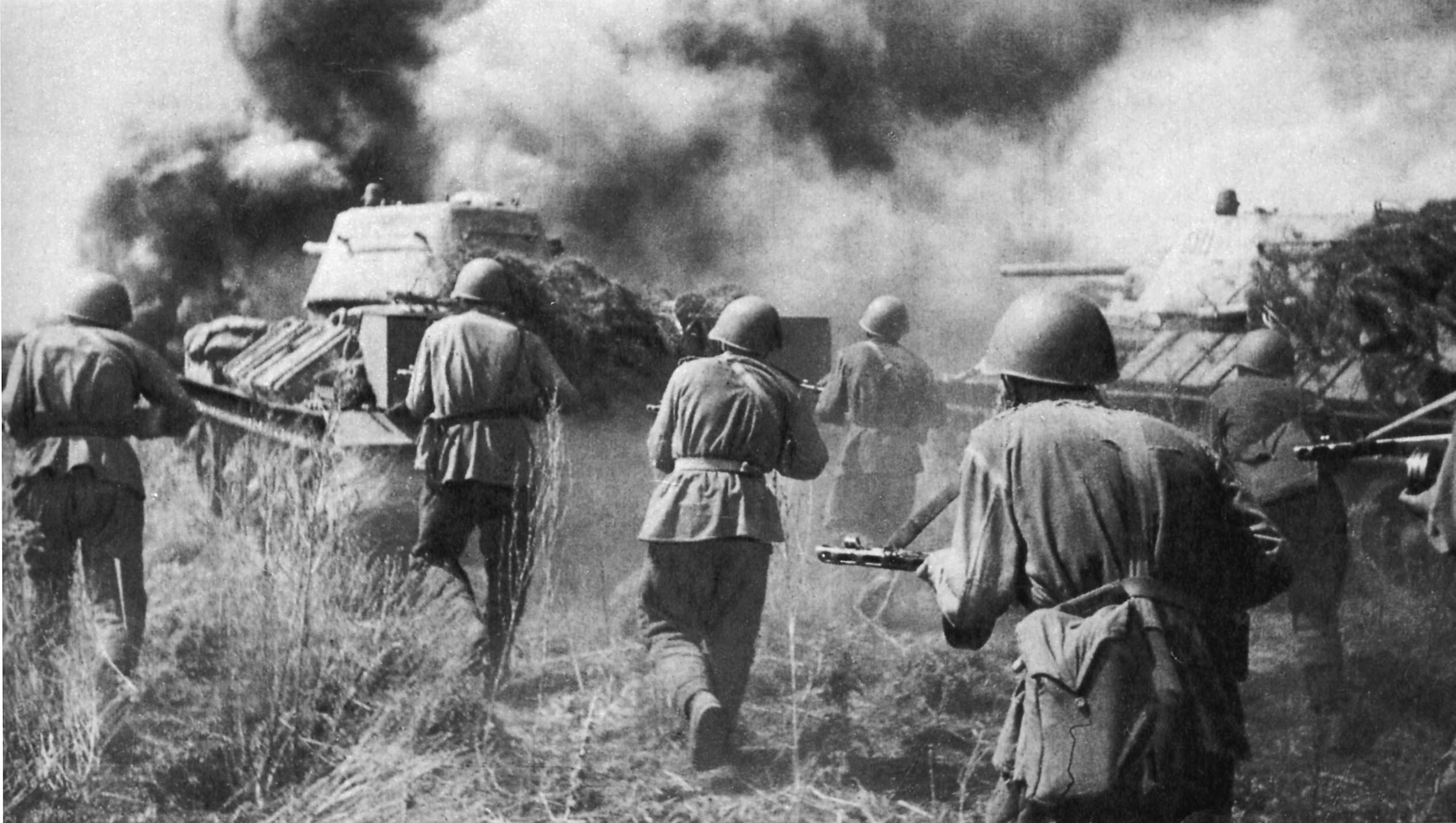
Soviet troops of Voronezh Front counterattacking behind T-34 tanks at Prokhorovka, July 12, 1943

The tank clash began at 0830 hours following a 30-minute artillery preparation, but this did not go according to General Rotmistrov's plan for his Tank Army, and by 1045 it had been halted at Hill 252.2 and the Oktiabrskii State Farm after suffering serious losses in men and machines. The 25th Tank Brigade of 29th Tank Corps had been directed to pass through Storozhevoe and attack toward Teterevino and Ivanovskii Vyselok. While the Storozhevoe area was generally in the possession of the 227th Regiment and the 2nd Tanks, during the previous evening units of Leibstandarte had infiltrated a grove northeast of the village. Marder III vehicles of 1st SS Panzerjäger Battalion were deployed overnight into ambush positions in the Stalinskoe Branch of the [Oktiabr'skii] State Farm. As the 25th Tanks, along with the attached SU-76s and SU-122s of 1446th Self-propelled Artillery Regiment, approached the State Farm they came under heavy artillery fire, which pinned down the accompanying infantry, then by direct antitank fire while advancing across open ground. In an almost completely one-sided battle the 25th Tanks lost 26 of 32 T-34s knocked out and the two batteries of the 1446th were completely destroyed.

Rotmistrov's plan had been for the 29th Tank Corps to split Leibstandarte before pivoting to the south. Then, by 1100 hours his 2nd Guards Tank Corps was to go into the attack and complete the encirclement of the German forces in the area of Storozhevoe and Iamki, which would then be destroyed in a joint attack by the 183rd the 2nd Tank Corps. The disaster suffered by 25th Tank Brigade called for a change in this plan. 2nd Guards Tanks went over to the attack at 1115 following a short artillery preparation and soon came under heavy Nebelwerfer fire and bombing attacks. This effort made little progress. At around 1500 the II Battalion of the 3rd SS Panzergrenadier Regiment Deutschland launched its own attack on Storozhevoe and cleared the defenders out of the southern part of the village as well as the wooded area to the south, while also taking the northern outskirts of Vinogradovka. 2nd Tank Corps suffered heavy losses as a result. One reason for this German success was lack of cooperation between the 183rd and the armored formations, particularly 2nd Guards Tanks. Kostitsyn's men went over to the attack toward Kalinin at 1310, but this was hours after the 2nd Guards had begun its assault. The two regiments of the 183rd lost 28 killed and 150 wounded in this effort without making any gains at all. Despite a day of battle that was, on balance, favorable to Army Group South, Hitler ordered von Manstein to shut down Operation Zitadelle that evening.

==== Operation Roland ====
As far as Vatutin knew, the threat of a panzer breakthrough remained; outbursts of bitter fighting near Storozhevoe continued overnight. He therefore organized a defense in depth for July 13, primarily with his 69th and 5th Guards Armies in first echelon. The 285th Regiment was positioned from outside Iamke to a hill northeast of Storozhevoe. The sector from north of that place to Belenikhino Station and then to near Leski was held by several armored units, with the 227th and 295th Rifle Regiments in second echelon. The division continued fighting against Das Reich for Kalinin and Sobachevskii, but its right flank was uncovered and it was finally forced to retreat. The next day, von Manstein, still intent on encircling 48th Corps, launched a limited attack from north and south. The northern prong was led by Deutschland and the 167th Infantry Division against the sectors held by the 183rd and 375th Rifle Division and 2nd Guards Tanks. This turned out to be some of toughest fighting the division had yet faced. The 167th struck the flank of the 295th Regiment, commanded by Maj. L. I. Matiushenko. Major Sazhinov of the 227th later recalled:

In the afternoon the situation became extremely difficult. The foe again [attacked] toward Belenikhino Station and our right flank came under assault. Soon enemy tanks were moving along the road from Belenikhino to Ivanovka, and bitter fighting broke out, which continued for several hours...
By evening, the enemy had outflanked [Ivanovka] to the north, and a large number of tanks had broken through in the sector of the 295th Rifle Regiment, lunging toward Shakhovo. I managed to get in touch with the division commander and reported that the enemy had broken through, and that more than 120 enemy tanks were moving along the farm road toward Shakhovo. Within several minutes, Katiushi and artillery deep in the rear opened a heavy fire on the enemy tanks. Twilight was gathering, and soon the fire of our artillery came to a stop. The enemy had seized Ivanovka, and we had suffered heavy losses and our badly disorganized combat formations had been nearly encircled. At night the regiment withdrew to its previous lines in the area of Novoselovka, where other units were already concentrating.

In other words, the 227th was now back to where it had begun its march toward Prokhorovka on the night of July 10/11. Elements of II SS and III Panzer Corps linked up in the early hours of July 15 near Shakhovo, but by now nearly all of 48th Corps had made an orderly withdrawal from the pocket. On July 16 the divisions of the Corps were pulled back to a new defense line. From July 12 to 17 blocking detachments of 69th Army's SMERSH department rounded up men who had become detached from their units or had escaped from encirclement. The total from the 183rd was 599, which was quite high compared to most of the others.

During the subsequent reorganization the 183rd was transferred to 35th Guards Corps. During the third week of the month the forces of Voronezh Front began to transition to the offensive in continued fighting around and south of Prokhorovka. On July 21–22 the 183rd pushed German forces out of the Velikyi Olshanets and Dalniaia Igumenka region, in the process causing some 300 German casualties. On July 24, General Kostitsyn, along with several of his staff officers and personnel, were killed when their command bunker was hit by a heavy shell. He was replaced the next day by Col. Leonid Dmitrievich Vasilevskii, who had been serving as Kostitsyn's chief of staff since June and had escaped his fate. This officer would lead the division into the postwar, being promoted to the rank of major general on September 13, 1944. By August 1 the 69th Army had been transferred to Steppe Front, and the 183rd again came under command of General Konev.

== Into Eastern Ukraine ==
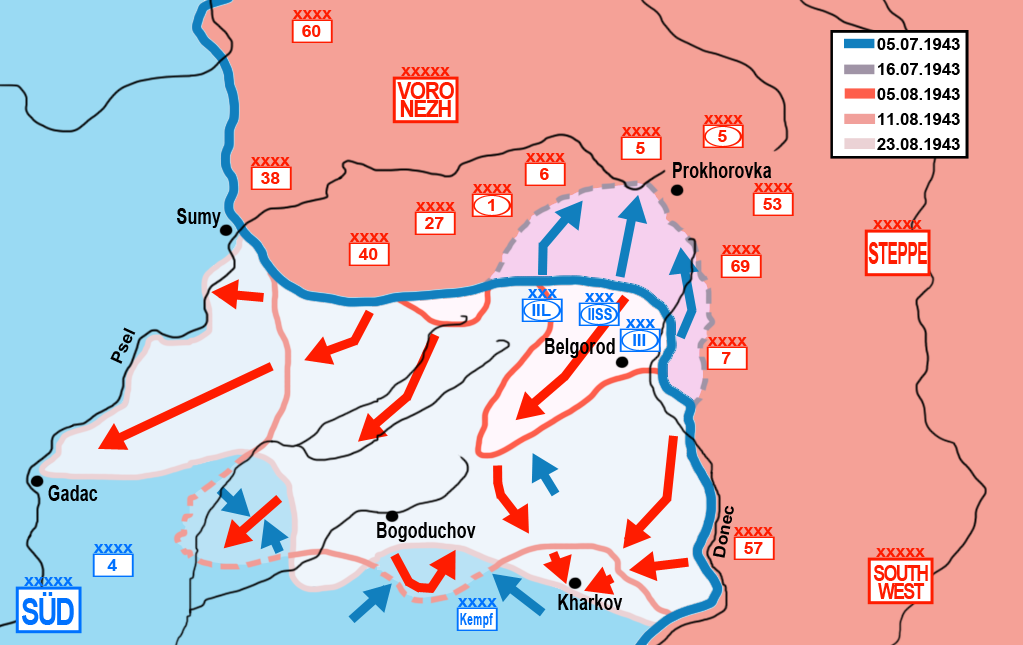
Operation Polkovodets Rumyantsev. Note location of 69th Army.

In preparation for the counteroffensive into Ukraine, Operation Polkovodets Rumyantsev, Konev formed a shock group consisting of the 53rd Army and the 48th Corps to attack on August 3 on a 11 km front from Glushinskii to Visloe. 48th Corps, to which the 183rd had returned just before the attack, was to break through the German defense and, developing the offensive in the general direction of Belgorod, was to reach a line from Zagotskot to Belomestnaya on the first day. The Corps, now with four divisions, was organized in a single echelon and was backed by a tank brigade, eight artillery regiments, three mortar and one Katyusha regiment plus two such battalions, deployed on an 8 km-wide sector from Visloe to Kiselevo. Its main thrust was to be made on the right flank and it was intended to break through the defense here and push through in the direction of Belgorod.

The offensive proceeded largely according to plan, with 48th Corps gaining 7–9 km on the first day. On August 4 the STAVKA tasked Steppe Front with the liberation of Belgorod, which Konev assigned to 69th and 7th Guards Armies. The German forces had transformed the city into a powerful center of resistance with a ring-shaped defense line built during the winter of 1941–1942 and a large number of other engineering works including extensive minefields. It was defended by units of the 198th Infantry Division reinforced by artillery, mortars and tanks. Nevertheless, on the morning of August 5 several divisions of 69th Army plus flank forces of 7th Guards Army took Belgorod by storm by 1800 hours.

Following this victory the offensive continued in the direction of Kharkiv. On August 13 forces of Steppe Front broke through the external defensive line that the German command had prepared around the city and by August 17 fighting had begun in its northern outskirts. By this time the division had returned to 35th Guards Corps, and it was under this command when it broke into the center of the city and linked up with the 89th Guards and 107th Rifle Divisions at Dzerzhinsky Square, marking the final liberation of Kharkiv and earning it an honorific:

KHARKOV... 183rd Rifle Division (Colonel Vasilevskii, Leonid Dmitrievich)... The troops that participated in the liberation of Kharkov, by order of the Supreme Commander-in-Chief of 23 August 1943 and a commendation in Moscow, are given a salute of 20 artillery salvoes of 224 guns.

On September 26 the division, along with 35th Guards Corps and all the rest of 69th Army, was withdrawn to the Reserve of the Supreme High Command. The 183rd spent the next six weeks being extensively rebuilt, and it returned to the fighting front on November 12, now assigned to 74th Rifle Corps in the 1st Guards Army of 1st Ukrainian Front.

== Into Western Ukraine ==
At this time 1st Ukrainian Front was on the defensive, under attack by the 4th Panzer Army. The Army was to unload from its trains during November 11–26 at Brovary and Darnitsa stations, along with the 25th Tank Corps, and reinforce the Front as it regrouped. In orders from the STAVKA, "the front's most important and main task is to defeat the enemy's Belaya Tserkov' group of forces and the capture Popel'nya, Belaya Tserkov' and Kagarlyk with the front's left wing, after which you are again to force the offensive along the Kazatin axis." The Front commander, General Vatutin, ordered the arriving elements of the Army to be immediately moved to the west bank of the Dniepr, without waiting to complete concentration, and move to the west and southwest of Kyiv. The 183rd was among the last to arrive.

=== Kyiv Strategic Defensive Operation ===
The 38th Army was struck on November 15 by the 1st Panzer and Leibstandarte Divisions. The goal was to defeat 1st Ukrainian Front, recapture Kyiv, and eliminate the Red Army's bridgehead over the Dniepr. 1st Guards began arriving in strength on the evening of November 21, and the 74th Corps was ordered to take up defensive positions along a line from Iline Nizhilovichi to Gruzkoye to Sosnovka by 0800 hours on November 22, with its front facing west. Vatutin decided to go over to the counterattack with the 1st Guards' 94th Rifle Corps on November 25, but its 74th and 107th Rifle Corps would remain on the defense. In fact the Army was not ready to attack, in part due to a Front-wide shortage of ammunition, and Vatutin postponed the start by 24 hours. Fighting continued through November 29 but both sides were by now effectively played out. During December the 183rd, still in 74th Corps, was reassigned to 38th Army, commanded by General Moskalenko, still in 1st Ukrainian Front.

=== Zhitomir–Berdichev and Proskurov-Chernivtsi Offensives ===
Vatutin's counteroffensive finally began on December 24 but initially only involved the 1st Guards and the 1st Tank Armies. It soon expanded to include the 38th Army, which was facing the German XIII Army Corps north of Zhytomyr. By December 30 the 4th Panzer Army's front was breaking apart and a 58 km-wide gap had opened between it and XIII Corps; the following day Zhytomyr was liberated for the second time. On January 4, 1944, that Corps, attempting to hold at and northwest of Berdychiv, reported that it was falling apart, and that city fell a few days later. By the end of the month the lines had stabilized north of Vinnytsia. The offensive was renewed on March 4. 38th Army was on the left (south) flank of the Front and its initial objective was Vinnytsia, after which it was to continue to advance southwest toward Zhmerynka, which had been designated as a Festung (fortress) by Hitler. The former was liberated on March 20 and the 183rd was recognized for its role with the award of the Order of the Red Banner three days later.

=== Lviv–Sandomierz Offensive ===
As of the beginning of April the 74th Corps was under direct command of the Front. Later that month the 183rd was moved back to 1st Guards Army, where it joined the 52nd Rifle Corps. Just prior to the start of the Lviv–Sandomierz offensive it returned to 38th Army, where it was initially under direct Army command. The division would remain in this Army for the duration of the war.

In the planning for this operation in July the 38th Army was to penetrate the German defense in the Bzovitsa and Bogdanovka sector on a front of 6 km. It would then develop the offensive with seven divisions in the direction of Peremyshliany with the objective of encircling the German Lviv grouping in cooperation with the 4th Tank and 60th Armies. The offensive began on July 13 and went largely according to this plan; Lviv was liberated on July 27 and by August 4 units of 4th Tank and 38th Armies were fighting in positions from Khyriv to north of Sambir and further along the Dniestr River to Rozvaduv. One of the 183rd's rifle regiments was awarded a battle honor:

LVOV... 227th Rifle Regiment (Major Katantsev, Vasilii Mikhailovich)... The troops who participated in the liberation of Lvov, by the order of the Supreme High Command of 27 July 1944, and a commendation in Moscow, are given a salute of 20 artillery salvoes from 224 guns.

On August 10 the 285th and 295th Rifle Regiments would both be awarded the Order of the Red Banner for their roles in the same victory. During the offensive the division was assigned to the 101st Rifle Corps, where it remained for the duration.

== Into Poland and the Carpathians ==
During September and October the division took part in the East Carpathian Offensive, particularly in the area of the Dukla Pass. In November, 38th Army was transferred to 4th Ukrainian Front, Fighting died down until the start of the Western Carpathian Offensive on January 12, 1945, which coincided with the wider Vistula–Oder offensive. The Front commander, Army Gen. I. Ye. Petrov, planned to attack with part of his forces toward Kraków to the northwest, which would assist 1st Ukrainian Front in taking this place, Meanwhile, 38th Army would break through the defense on a 6 km-wide sector south of Jasło before advancing in the direction of Nowy Sącz and Krakow. For the breakthrough, which was set for January 15, the number of guns and mortars was brought up to 180-190 tubes per kilometre of front.

38th Army attacked following a heavy artillery and airstrike preparation with the 101st and 67th Rifle Corps and by the end of the first day had broken through the XI SS Army Corps and began advancing westward, threatening to encircle German 17th Army. By January 18 the Soviet forces had advanced 50–60 km in cooperation with 60th Army of 1st Ukrainian Front. However, elements of 101st Corps had been left behind to clear stubborn German resistance in the utterly devastated town of Jasło. This was finally overcome, and several subunits of the 183rd were recognized for their success:

JASLO... 285th Rifle Regiment (Lt. Colonel Karpov, Aleksandr Karpovich)... 623rd Artillery Regiment (Lt. Colonel Rachkov, Mikhail Aleksandrovich)... The troops who participated in the capture of Jasło and Gorlice, by the order of the Supreme High Command of 19 January 1945, and a commendation in Moscow, are given a salute of 20 artillery salvoes from 224 guns.

In addition, on February 19 the 227th Regiment would be decorated with the Order of the Red Banner, while the 295th Regiment received the Order of Suvorov, 3rd Degree.

=== Moravia–Ostrava Offensive ===
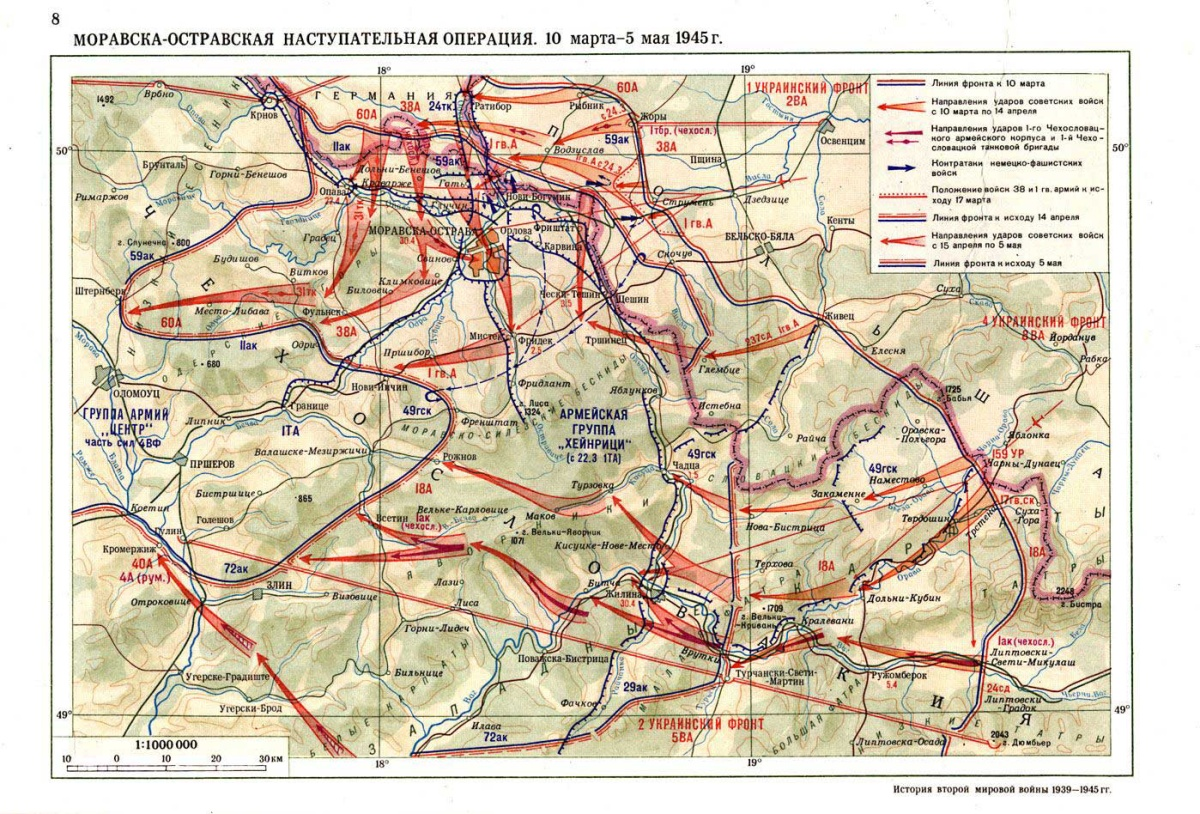
Moravia-Ostrava Offensive. Note positions of 38th Army.

The advance soon continued into Slovakia, and on the same date the 183rd as a whole would be awarded the Order of Suvorov, 2nd Degree, for the capture of Vaďovce, Levoča, and other towns, while the 18th Antitank Battalion received the Order of the Red Banner, an unusual award for a unit of its size. The Moravia–Ostrava offensive began on March 10, but in the first eight days of fighting 38th Army was unable to completely penetrate the German defense. During the last half of March the Army again cooperated with 60th Army in encircling and destroying the German grouping defending east and southeast of Ratibor. This was in conjunction with a renewal of the offensive on March 22, with part of the 38th, including 101st Corps, advancing on Opava. This effort proved more successful, although Opava was not finally taken until April 22.

On April 18, in the fighting to seize a bridgehead over the Opava River, Maj. Fattakh Gafuryanovich Shamgulov became a Hero of the Soviet Union. A Bashkir by nationality, he had been drafted into the Red Army in 1940 at Ufa, and was selected for officer training. He had been at the front since May 1942 and was currently serving as deputy commander of the 227th Regiment. Shamgulov was among the first to cross the river. With a team of five other men he personally killed or wounded up to 13 of 20 German soldiers and captured a bunker. This was followed by a pursuit to a heavily fortified village which was taken, but Shamgulov was killed. He was buried at Psznya, Poland and on May 15, 1946, was posthumously awarded the Gold Star.

The city of Ostrava fell on April 30, and the 183rd spent the last week of the war marching with the rest of 38th Army in the direction of Olomouc.

== Postwar ==
The 183rd and its subunits continued to receive decorations following the German surrender. On May 28 the division was awarded both the Order of Bogdan Khmelnitsky, 2nd Degree for its part in the battle for Opava, and a rare, for a regular rifle division, Order of Lenin for its role in the taking of Ostrava, Žilina, and other places. On June 4 a variety of distinctions came to several subunits for capturing several towns in Czechoslovakia, including Bohumín:

- 227th Rifle Regiment – Order of Bogdan Khmelnitsky, 2nd Degree
- 285th Rifle Regiment – Order of Alexander Nevsky
- 295th Rifle Regiment – Order of Bogdan Khmelnitsky, 2nd Degree
- 304th Sapper Battalion – Order of the Red Star
- 609th Signal Battalion – Order of Bogdan Khmelnitsky, 3rd Degree

At this point the men and women of the division shared the full title of 183rd Rifle, Kharkov, Order of Lenin, Order of the Red Banner, Orders of Suvorov and Bogdan Khmelnitsky Division. (Russian: 183-я стрелковая Харьковская ордена Ленина, Краснознамённая, орденов Суворова и Богдана Хмельницкого дивизия.)

General Vasilevskii remained in command until July 1946, when he took command of the 70th Guards Rifle Division. He would hold several other commands and continue his military education until April 1, 1955, when he retired. He died on June 16, 1978, in Omsk. What remained of the division was led by Col. Ya. V. Karpov as chief of staff. It was disbanded in March 1947 and the remaining personnel were reassigned to the 23rd Mechanized Division.
