= Kostitsyn =

Kostitsyn (Belarusian: Касціцын, Russian: Костицын) is a surname of Slavic-language origin. Notable people with this surname include:

- Andrei Kostitsyn (born 1985), Belarusian ice hockey player
- Alexander Kostitsyn (1904 - 1943), Soviet general
- Sergei Kostitsyn (born 1987), Belarusian ice hockey player
- Vladimir Kostitsyn (born 1945), Russian geophysicist
