= 2024 Korochansky Ilyushin Il-76 crash =

Russian transport crash in Belgorod Oblast, Russia

- RF-86868, the aircraft involved in the accident, pictured in July 2019

Occurrence
- Date: 24 January 2024
- Summary: Shot down by Ukraine, according to US officials
- Site: Near Yablonovo, Korochansky District, Belgorod Oblast, Russia; 50°53′37″N 37°20′29″E

Aircraft
- Aircraft type: Ilyushin Il-76M
- Operator: Russian Air Force
- Registration: RF-86868
- Flight origin: Chkalovsky Air Base, Moscow Oblast, Russia
- Destination: Belgorod International Airport, Belgorod Oblast, Russia North-eastern direction of flight (eyewitness testimony)
- Occupants: 74
- Passengers: 68
- Crew: 6
- Fatalities: 74
- Survivors: 0

On 24 January 2024, at around 11:15 MSK, a Russian Air Force Ilyushin Il-76 military transport plane crashed near the Ukrainian border in Russia's Korochansky district in Belgorod Oblast, killing everyone on board. Russia stated that the plane was shot down by Ukraine while it was carrying 65 Ukrainian prisoners of war (POWs) captured during the Russian invasion of Ukraine, as well as six crew members and three guards, and that the prisoners of war were to be exchanged in a swap. The General Staff of the Ukrainian Armed Forces did not directly take responsibility for shooting down the airplane, but stated that it was a legitimate military target and that it was carrying S-300 anti-aircraft missiles for bombing Kharkiv Oblast.

Some French and US officials said that the downing of the aircraft was caused by a Patriot missile fired by the Ukrainian army.

== Background ==
Ukraine's Coordination HQ on the Treatment of POWs estimates that more than 8,000 Ukrainian civilians and military personnel are being held prisoner by Russia since the start of its invasion in 2022, with tens of thousands still unaccounted for. Prior to the crash, on 3 January, Ukraine returned 248 POWs to Russia in exchange for 230 of its citizens in the largest such prisoner exchange of the conflict, following mediation by the United Arab Emirates.

Belgorod Oblast, where the crash happened, has been the scene of spillovers and cross-border fighting with Ukraine, with an airstrike in Belgorod city on 30 December 2023 killing 25 people and injuring more than 100 others.

== Aircraft and crew ==
The Ilyushin Il-76 is a multi-purpose aircraft, with a military version for carrying troops, equipment and ammunition. Russian officials said that 65 of the occupants were Ukrainian prisoners of war, and that six Russian crew members and three guards were also on board. The Russian Ministry of Defence said the crash occurred "during a routine flight". The 65 Ukrainian soldiers were supposedly being transported to Belgorod Oblast for a prisoner exchange at the Kolotilovka border crossing 100 kilometers west of Belgorod city. The Russian military said the flight originated from Chkalovsky Air Base near Moscow.

The Il-76 and the crew belonged to the 117th Military Transport Aviation Regiment (military base No. 45097), the regiment's tasks include servicing military vehicles transporting special cargo for material support of the Russian army. The regiment's aircraft are stationed at Orenburg airfield.

Russian news media reported a crew of six people, consisting of captain Stanislav Alekseevich Bezzubkin (35), co-pilot Vladislav Vadimovich Chmirev (24), navigator Alexey Anatolyevich Vysokin (31), flight engineer Andrey Leonidovich Piluev (38), technician Sergey Nikolaevich Zhitenev (34), and radio operator Igor Vyacheslavovich Sablinsky (54).

== Crash ==
External videos
- Video of the plane crash (via BBC News Russian, shooting location, the video camera is pointing north-northwest)

The crash occurred in a field about 5–6 km (3.1–3.7 mi) from Yablonovo, Belgorod Oblast, according to the village's rector. According to Viktor Bondarev, former Commander of the Russian Aerospace Forces, an external impact was reported by the crew before the crash. The Moscow Times, citing analysis of videos of the crash on social media, reported that the military plane was flying away from the border with Ukraine when it crashed.

At 10:35 MSK the governor of Belgorod Oblast, Vyacheslav Gladkov, reported that the air defense system of the Belgorod Oblast shot down an aviation-type UAV with a fixed-wing over the village of Blizhne, 75 km (47 mi) southwest of Yablonovo. At 11:12 MSK, he announced that a "missile alert" had been activated in the region and urged residents to take shelter. At 11:43 MSK he reported that the signal had been cancelled. The first media reports about the crash appeared at 11:48.

== Investigations and claims of responsibility ==
=== According to Russia ===
Russia's foreign ministry accused Ukraine of downing the aircraft, calling it a "barbaric" act and stating that the aircraft was shot down by one of three missiles – Patriot or IRIS – launched at it by Ukraine. Foreign minister Sergei Lavrov called the incident a "criminal" act by Ukraine and called for an urgent session of the United Nations Security Council to demand an explanation from Ukraine; a meeting was set for the afternoon of 25 January, New York time, during which Russian and Ukrainian representatives reiterated their countries' positions and blamed each other for the incident.

The Russian Defence Ministry said that the aircraft was shot down by two missiles that were fired from the Lyptsi area, 100 km (62 mi) across the border in Kharkiv Oblast, citing its radar systems. Andrei Kartapolov, the chairman of the defence committee of the State Duma of Russia, said that a second plane on its way to transport 80 Ukrainian POWs turned back following the incident, adding that "there can now be no talk of any other [prisoner] exchanges". Kartapolov later said that Russia had warned Ukraine about the aircraft's approach at least 15 minutes before the incident, which Ukrainian officials denied. The chair of the State Duma, Vyacheslav Volodin, said that the chamber would send a formal address to the US Congress and the German Bundestag over the incident to demand that they "recognize their responsibility".

Presidential spokesperson Dmitry Peskov called the incident "a monstrous act" by the "Kyiv regime". President Vladimir Putin said that it was "obvious" that Ukraine had downed the aircraft, and said that Kyiv had known beforehand of the arrangements for the transport of the prisoners aboard the plane. He also pledged to publicize the results of the Russian investigation "so that people in Ukraine know what really happened." Putin later said that the aircraft was shot down by a Patriot missile system. On 25 January, the Investigative Committee of Russia opened a terrorism investigation into the incident and released footage of the crash site, showing traces of blood and parts of human remains, including a tattoo depicting a tryzub. It later released a blurry video purportedly showing prisoners being transported to the aircraft.

On 30 January, TASS, citing a security agency source, reported that the aircraft was brought down by an "external impact" based on analysis of its black boxes.

=== According to Ukraine ===
Ukrainska Pravda had reported that sources in the Ukrainian general staff said the aircraft was carrying S-300 missiles, and that Ukraine had shot down the aircraft. It later amended the report to say this did not indicate Ukrainian involvement. The Coordination Headquarters for the Treatment of Prisoners of War, which is the Ukrainian agency in charge of POWs, accused Russia of "actively carrying out special information operations against Ukraine, which are aimed at destabilising Ukrainian society". The independent Russian media outlet iStories, citing Ukrainian OSINT investigations, reported that the aircraft had flown over Egypt, Saudi Arabia, the Red Sea and Iran before disappearing from radars and reappearing over Belgorod Oblast.

According to a spokesperson for Ukraine's Main Directorate of Intelligence (HUR), a prisoner exchange between Russia and Ukraine was scheduled on the day of the crash, yet it did not happen. It also said that on the day of the incident, its counterparts in Russia had not informed them of the need to ensure the safety of the area's airspace, contrary to previous practices, and had already transported the Russian POWs that were supposed to be exchanged to the designated venue. The agency said that the incident may have been a "deliberate" move by Russia to "create a threat to the life and safety of the prisoners."

On 25 January, the HUR said that it had received intelligence that several senior Russian military and political officials were supposed to be on board the aircraft but were told by the Federal Security Service (FSB) to take other forms of transportation instead. It also said that the FSB and the Russian military prevented emergency workers from inspecting the crash site, while at least five bodies were recovered and sent to a morgue in Belgorod, and no other human remains were found at the scene, citing video taken of the area. The HUR also hypothesized that the aircraft might have been shot down by friendly fire while Russian air defenses tried to intercept a drone. Reacting to Russian assertion of POWs on board, it also said that Russia was possibly using Ukrainian POWs as human shields to transport weapons and ammunition.

In his address that evening, President Volodymyr Zelenskyy said that it was "obvious that the Russians are playing with the lives of Ukrainian prisoners, with the feelings of their relatives and with the emotions of our society", but did not confirm the presence of POWs aboard the aircraft, saying that it was still being clarified by the HUR. Zelenskyy also said that the Security Service of Ukraine was also investigating the crash, and ordered his foreign minister Dmytro Kuleba to inform international partners about the data available to Ukraine during the course of the investigation. He also insisted on an international investigation to determine what had happened. Likewise, Ukrainian human rights ombudsman Dmytro Lubinets said that he would send letters to the United Nations and the International Committee of the Red Cross urging them to call for an investigation.

=== According to other countries ===
The BBC reported on the evening of 24 January, that after eight hours of no official information being given, two official statements were made by the Ukrainian General Staff and the HUR that "amount to acknowledgement that Ukraine may have shot the plane down". Western military analysts also told BBC News Russian that video taken of the crash indicated that the aircraft was shot down.

France Info reported that according to a French military source, the aircraft was hit by a US-made Patriot air defence battery operated by the Ukrainian army.

The New York Times reported on 8 February that, according to anonymous US officials, the Il-76 was shot down by an MIM-104 Patriot missile operated by Ukraine, and that claims that there were Ukrainian POWs on board were "probable".

== Identification of victims ==
The first victims to be recovered were found around 1.5-2 kilometers from the crash site. Russia Today chief editor Margarita Simonyan published a list of 65 names she said were those of Ukrainian POWs on board the flight. Upon analyzing the list, Ukraine's public broadcaster Suspilne confirmed that the names on the list were Ukrainian POWs being held in Russia but said it could not verify whether they were on board the aircraft or part of any prisoner exchange. The Ukrainian government later said that the list of names published by Simonyan lined up with those set to be released in the prisoner exchange on 24 January, but that whether those POWs were on the plane was unclear.

On 25 January, Lubinets said that based on photographs and footage taken on the crash site, there was no indication of "any signs that there were such a large number of people on the plane." He also said that some of the prisoners identified in Simonyan's list had already been released in prior POW exchanges. Following a meeting between Ukrainian security officials and relatives of the POWs mentioned in Simonyan's list, the HUR said that the latter had not been able to identify any prisoners from the footage of the crash site released by Russian sources. Ukrainian officials said they had only received a list of POWs who were supposedly on board the plane from Russia on 26 January and requested that the bodies of those who died be repatriated, but had not received a response from Russia. On 9 February, Ukrainian National Security and Defense Council Secretary Oleksii Danilov reiterated the non-existence of Ukrainian POWs on board the aircraft in an interview with Babel, citing the absence of large quantities of "biological material" at the crash site.

One of the names on Simonyan's list of POWs killed in the crash was Maxim Anatolievich Konovalenko, a prisoner known to have already been repatriated to Ukraine during an exchange on 3 January 2024.

In February 2025, an official of Ukraine's Coordination Headquarters for the Treatment of Prisoners of War said in an interview that most of the bodies' remains had DNA matches with that of the relatives of the prisoners of war. He said that whether the remains belonged to the bodies on board the plane was not confirmed. In April 2025, the Ukrainian Deputy Minister of Internal Affairs, Leonid Tymchenko said in an interview that from the 60 Ukrainian POWs dead from the aircraft shot-down, 500 remains handed by Russia were being studied by DNA specialists to get a DNA profile to help with the identification.

== Aftermath ==
The governor of Belgorod Oblast, Vyacheslav Gladkov, posted on Telegram that "an investigation team and emergency services" had been deployed to the crash site, adding that he had "travelled to the district." He also said there were no survivors. A team of investigators was also deployed by the Russian Aerospace Forces. The aircraft's flight recorders were recovered from the crash site on 25 January, with TASS saying that they would be sent to a laboratory of the Russian defense ministry for analysis.

A nationwide air alert was briefly declared in Ukraine following the crash (11:41 – 13:58 EET) while President Zelenskyy cancelled a scheduled trip on 25 January. Following the crash, the Ukrainian military said that it would continue to attack Russian aircraft in Belgorod Oblast.

On 26 January, a pre-planned exchange of war dead proceeded as scheduled between Russia and Ukraine, with 55 bodies of Russian fatalities being repatriated in return for 77 Ukrainian dead.

United Nations undersecretary-general Rosemary DiCarlo urged "all concerned to refrain from actions, rhetoric or allegations that could further fuel the already dangerous conflict." A spokesperson for the International Committee of the Red Cross in Ukraine called on Russia to repatriate the remains of POWs who may have died in the crash.

On 28 January, the Coordination Headquarters for the Treatment of Prisoners of War was targeted in a cyberattack by Russian hackers that affected its information resources. The agency linked the cyberattack to the plane crash.

An exchange of POWs between the warring countries was held on 31 January, in which 195 Russians and 207 Ukrainians were returned to their home countries. The exchange was brokered by the United Arab Emirates. None of the people present on the list provided by Russia were included in the swap.

On 29 February, Russian presidential commissioner for human rights Tatyana Moskalkova said that Russia was willing to repatriate the remains of the POWs killed in the crash. In response, Ukraine's human rights ombudsman Dmytro Lubinets accused her of "speculating" on the crash, noting that Russia had not released an official passenger list or gave access to international organizations to the crash site.

On 8 November, Russia repatriated the remains of 563 Ukrainian servicemen in exchange for the bodies of 37 Russians. Russian news channel Mash and Zaporizhzhia-based collaborationist group We Are Together with Russia said that among the returned remains were 62 POWs who died in the crash.

On 9 December, Tatyana Moskalkova said that the remains of the POWs killed in the crash had been returned to Ukraine following an exchange but did not give further details.

== See also ==
- Olenivka prison massacre
- Timeline of the Russian invasion of Ukraine (1 December 2023 – present)
