= Alexander Kostitsyn =

- Born: 9 June 1904; Mogutovskoye stanitsa, Yelisavetpolskoye, Verkhneuralsky Uyezd, Orenburg Governorate, Russian Empire
- Died: 24 July 1943 (aged 39) Dalnyaya Igumenka, Korochansky District, Belgorod Oblast, Soviet Union
- Allegiance: Soviet Union
- Branch: Red Army; OGPU Troops (later NKVD Troops); Red Army
- Service years: 1926–1943
- Rank: Major general
- Commands: 172nd Rifle Division; 183rd Rifle Division
- Conflicts: World War II †
- Awards: Order of the Red Banner; Order of the Patriotic War, 1st class; Order of the Red Star

Alexander Stepanovich Kostitsyn (Russian: Алекса́ндр Степанович Костицын; 9 June 1904 – 24 July 1943) was a Red Army major general killed during World War II.

An NKVD troops officer before the war, Kostitsyn became a regimental commander in the Red Army during mid-1941 and led his regiment in the Battles of Rzhev. He became commander of the 183rd Rifle Division in early 1942 but was seriously wounded, spending several months hospitalized. After briefly becoming commander of the 172nd Rifle Division following his recovery, Kostitsyn returned to the 183rd, leading it in the Third Battle of Kharkov, the Battle of Kursk, and the subsequent Soviet offensive. He was killed by an artillery shell that struck his headquarters in late July.

== Early life and prewar service ==
Kostitsyn was born on 9 June 1904 in the stanitsa of Mogutovskoe, Yelisavetpolskoye, Verkhneuralsky Uyezd, Orenburg Governorate. During the Russian Civil War, in November 1919, he became secretary of the local committee of workers and servants of the district provisions committee for Poltavsky District. Between May and October 1920 he served as a Red Army man in the Palchikov Communist Detachment in Poltavka, fighting in the suppression of banditry in Adamskoye volost, then working as a procurement specialist in the district provisions committee. Between March and September 1923 he studied at courses for inspectors at the People's Commissariat for Food Supplies in Moscow and after graduation worked as an inspector in the district provisions committee at Poltavka. From April 1924 he worked as a striker, fireman, and assistant driver at the Shimanovskaya station on the Ussuriysk Railway (a branch of the Trans-Siberian Railway), He was drafted into the Red Army on 1 October 1926, being sent to the sapper battalion of the 18th Rifle Corps in Irkutsk.

After graduating from the battalion school in 1927, he served as an assistant platoon commander. In October 1928 Kostitsyn became commander of a militarized railway protection detachment in Irkutsk. He was sent to study at the School for Improvement of Commanders of Rifle Protection of Communications Routes in Moscow in August 1930, graduating a year later. Kostitsyn was then appointed chief of staff of the 1st District of Militarized Railway Protection Troops, and in April 1932 became a battalion commander in the 5th Railway Regiment of the OGPU Troops at Utulik station on the Trans-Baikal Railway. From September 1934 he served as head of the junior commanders' school, and in December 1935 became a battalion commander in the 69th Regiment of the NKVD Troops at Chita. From May 1936 to November 1937 he studied at the NKVD Infantry School in Moscow, and after graduation was appointed assistant chief of staff of the 228th Convoy Troops Regiment NKVD in Kharkov. From April to November 1938 he taught courses for junior lieutenants at the Brovary camp near Kiev, then served in the 228th Convoy Troops Regiment NKVD as senior assistant regimental chief of staff, a battalion commander, and regimental chief of staff. In November 1939 he was appointed commander of the 132nd Separate Convoy Troops Battalion NKVD in Brest.

== World War II ==
At the beginning of Operation Barbarossa, the German invasion of the Soviet Union, in June 1941, Kostitsyn was transferred to command the 251st NKVD Troops Regiment of the Western Front. He became commander of the 910th Rifle Regiment of the 243rd Rifle Division, formed from NKVD personnel, in August. The regiment and the division became part of the 29th Army of the front and fought in the Battle of Smolensk at the junction of the Western and Northwestern Fronts. He went on to lead the regiment in battles on the Northern Dvina south of Toropets, at Rzhev, and in the Kalinin Defensive and Offensive Operations. Kostitsyn became commander of the army's 183rd Rifle Division on 19 March 1942, defending positions north of Rzhev. He was seriously wounded on 11 May and remained in the hospital until 30 August, before being placed at the disposal of the People's Commissariat of Defense Personnel Directorate. For his leadership of the 910th Regiment in September 1941, Kostitsyn received the Order of the Red Star on 28 August 1942.

Appointed commander of the 172nd Rifle Division on 9 September, Kostitsyn led the division while it began forming in the Moscow Defense Zone. He was transferred back to command the 183rd Rifle Division, now in the Reserve of the Supreme High Command, on 30 September. Between 7 and 20 January 1943 the 183rd was relocated to the Voronezh Front, joining the 40th Army. Kostitsyn led the division in the Ostrogozhsk–Rossosh Offensive, the Voronezh–Kastornoye operation, and the Third Battle of Kharkov. For his leadership of the division in the Kharkov Offensive Kostitsyn was awarded the Order of the Red Banner on 25 March. In March the division fought in the defense of Kharkov during the latter, and was forced by the German advance to retreat to the Seversky Donets, after which it defended positions in the area of Krutoy Log and Nizhny Olshanets. At the beginning of April it was assigned to the army rear defensive line near Prokhorovka. The division defended its positions at the beginning of the Battle of Kursk on 6 July, repulsing German attacks. As part of the 69th Army's 35th Guards Rifle Corps, Kostitsyn led the 183rd during the subsequent Soviet offensive. The attack began on 21 July, attacking German lines between Novy Oskol and Verkhnye Olshanets, which were captured before the division advanced to the defensive line between Height 217.4 and Dalnyaya Igumenka. On 24 July Kostitsyn and several staff officers were killed by a direct shell hit to the division command bunker. Buried in Novy Oskol, he was posthumously awarded the Order of the Patriotic War, 1st class on 24 August for his leadership of the division at Prokhorovka.
