= Afanasovo, Cherepovetsky District, Vologda Oblast =

Afanasovo Афанасово
- Village
- Location within Vologda Oblast Location within Russia
- Coordinates: 58°58′N 38°25′E
- Country: Russia
- Region: Vologda Oblast
- District: Cherepovetsky District
- Time zone: UTC+3:00

Afanasovo (Russian: Афанасово) is a rural locality (a village) in Yugskoye Rural Settlement, Cherepovetsky District, Vologda Oblast, Russia. The population was 152 as of 2002.

== Geography ==
Afanasovo is located 43 km (27 mi) southeast of Cherepovets (the district's administrative centre) by road. Batran is the nearest rural locality.
