= Afanasovo, Vologodsky District, Vologda Oblast =

Afanasovo Афанасово
- Village
- Location within Vologda Oblast Location within Russia
- Coordinates: 59°36′N 39°08′E
- Country: Russia
- Region: Vologda Oblast
- District: Vologodsky District
- Time zone: UTC+3:00

Afanasovo (Russian: Афанасово) is a rural locality (a village) in Novlenskoye Rural Settlement, Vologodsky District, Vologda Oblast, Russia. The population was 29 as of 2002.

== Geography ==
Afanasovo is located 78 km northwest of Vologda (the district's administrative centre) by road. Khomyakovo is the nearest rural locality.
