= Afanasovo, Sheksninsky District, Vologda Oblast =

Afanasovo Афанасово
- Village
- Location within Vologda Oblast Location within Russia
- Coordinates: 59°19′N 38°24′E
- Country: Russia
- Region: Vologda Oblast
- District: Sheksninsky District
- Time zone: UTC+3:00

Afanasovo (Russian: Афанасово) is a rural locality (a village) in Yershovskoye Rural Settlement, Sheksninsky District, Vologda Oblast, Russia. The population was 2 as of 2002.

== Geography ==
Afanasovo is located 21 km (13 mi) northwest of Sheksna (the district's administrative centre) by road. Loginovo is the nearest rural locality.
