= Afanasovo, Muromsky District, Vladimir Oblast =

Afanasovo Афанасово
- Village
- Location within Vladimir Oblast Location within Russia
- Coordinates: 55°38′N 41°50′E
- Country: Russia
- Region: Vladimir Oblast
- District: Muromsky District
- Time zone: UTC+3:00

Afanasovo (Russian: Афана́сово) is a rural locality (a village) in Kovarditskoye Rural Settlement, Muromsky District, Vladimir Oblast, Russia. The population was 123 as of 2010.

== Geography ==
Afanasovo is located on the Unorka River, 17 km northwest of Murom (the district's administrative centre) by road. Zimenki is the nearest rural locality.
