= Afanasovo, Kirzhachsky District, Vladimir Oblast =

Afanasovo Афанасово
- Village
- Location within Vladimir Oblast Location within Russia
- Coordinates: 56°16′N 39°04′E
- Country: Russia
- Region: Vladimir Oblast
- District: Kirzhachsky District
- Time zone: UTC+3:00

Afanasovo (Russian: Афанасово) is a rural locality (a village) in Kiprevskoye Rural Settlement, Kirzhachsky District, Vladimir Oblast, Russia. The population was 368 as of 2010. There are 6 streets.

== Geography ==
Afanasovo is located 21 km northeast of Kirzhach (the district's administrative centre) by road. Kudrino is the nearest rural locality.
