= Korochansky District =

Korochansky District Корочанский район (Russian)
- District
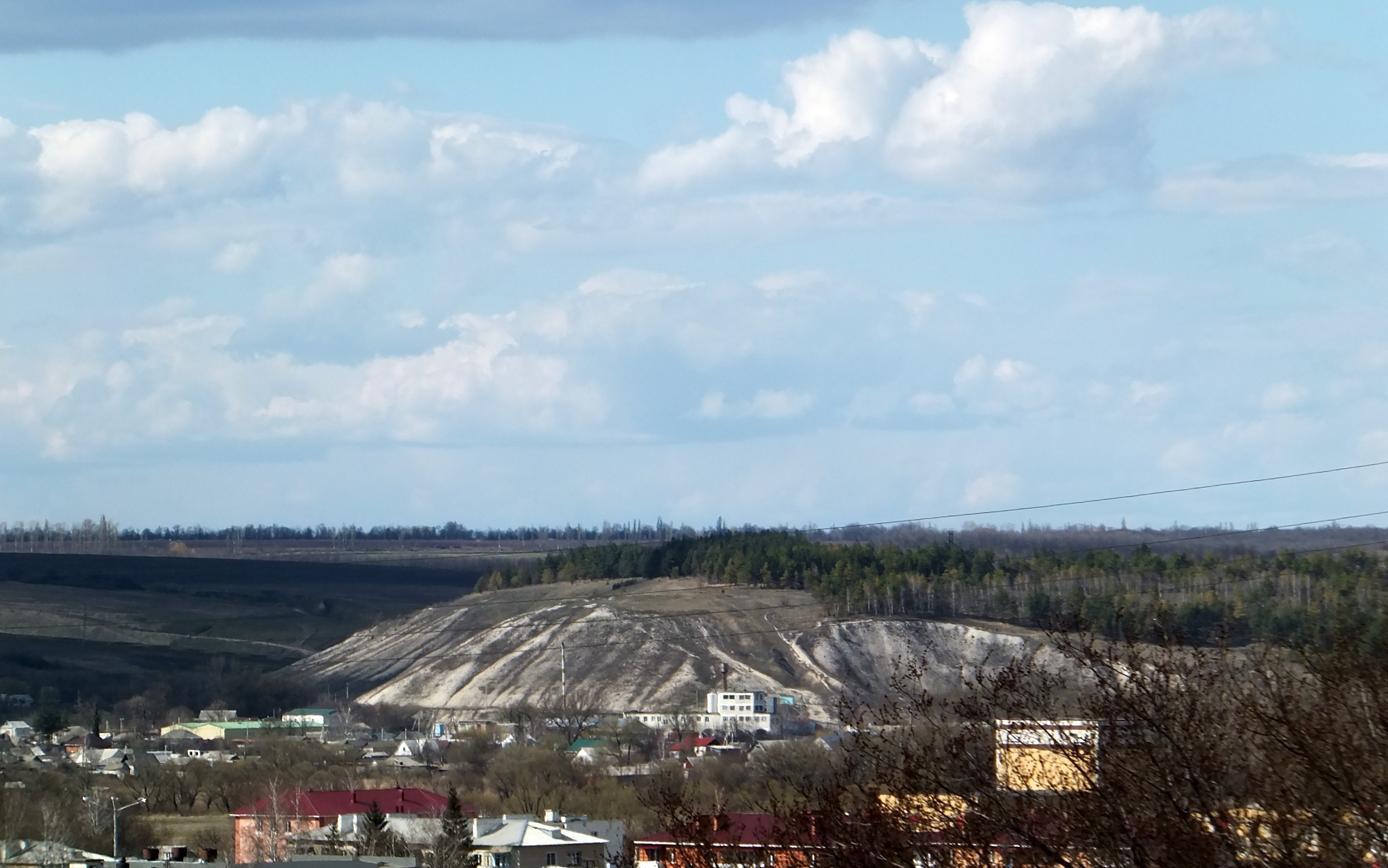
- Mount Belaya, a protected area of Russia in Korochansky District

- Flag Coat of arms
- Location of Korochansky District in Belgorod Oblast
- Coordinates: 50°49′N 37°12′E
- Country: Russia
- Federal subject: Belgorod Oblast
- Established: July 30, 1928
- Administrative center: Korocha

Area
  - Total: 1,464.1 km^{2} (565.3 sq mi)

Population (2010 Census)
  - Total: 38,695
  - Estimate (January 2015): 38,967
  - Density: 26.429/km^{2} (68.451/sq mi)
  - Urban: 15.2%
  - Rural: 84.8%

Administrative structure
  - Inhabited localities: 1 cities/towns, 127 rural localities

Municipal structure
  - Municipally incorporated as: Korochansky Municipal District
  - Municipal divisions: 1 urban settlements, 22 rural settlements
- Time zone: UTC+3 (MSK)
- OKTMO ID: 14640000
- Website: http://www.korocha.ru

Population of Korochansky District
- 2021 Census: 35,883
- 2010 Census: 38,695
- 2002 Census: 39,722
- 1989 Census: 39,409
- 1979 Census: 44,654

Korochansky District (Russian: Короча́нский райо́н) is an administrative district (raion), one of the twenty-one in Belgorod Oblast, Russia. As a municipal division, it is incorporated as Korochansky Municipal District. It is located in the center of the oblast. The area of the district is 1,464.1 square kilometers (565.3 sq mi). Its administrative center is the town of Korocha. As of the 2021 Census, the total population of the district was 35,883, with the population of Korocha accounting for 15.7% of that number.

== History ==
The modern history of the district dates back to the first half of the XVII century, when the construction of the Belgorod frontier began. On the territory of Korochansky district at that time passed Izyumsky way, on which on April 16, 1637, construction of fortress city Yablonov began. The fortress was built to block this route for the raids of Crimean Tatars and Nogais to Russia. A year later, in spring of 1638 to the south-west of Yablonov a fortress-town Korocha was built, which became an administrative center of Korocha area of Belgorod outskirt, and later - the center of the district of the same name.

Korocha uyezd is known by scribe descriptions as an administrative-territorial unit from the middle of the XVII century, it referred to the nearby settlements to Korocha. The town and the county were part of the Belgorod category. Korocha uyezd was formally abolished as an administrative-territorial unit in 1708 during the regional reform of Peter I, Korocha became part of Kiev province "for the proximity of Kiev".

In 1727 the Belgorod province, consisting of Belgorod, Oryol and Sevskaya provinces, was separated from Kiev province. Korochansk uyezd was restored as part of the Belgorod province of Belgorod province.

In 1779, the provincial reform of Catherine II abolished the Belgorod province. Korocha uyezd, the boundaries of which were revised (in particular, it included the abolished Yablonovsky uyezd), became part of the Kursk governorship.

In 1796, the Kursk governorship was transformed into the Kursk Province. Part of the territory of Korochansk uyezd was transferred to Starooskolsky uyezd, but to Korochansk uyezd was attached a part of Novooskolsky uyezd and a small territory, which had been moved from the abolished Kharkov vicegerency.

In 1802, in connection with the restoration of the districts, abolished in 1796, the borders of Korocha district were again revised. From 1802 to 1924 Korochanskiy uyezd existed without significant territorial changes. By the decree of the Presidium of the All-Russian Central Executive Committee of May 12, 1924 Korocha district was abolished and its territory was almost completely included in the enlarged Belgorod uyezd.

Korocha district was formed on the 30th of July, 1928 as a part of Belgorod district of Central-Chernozem region. It also included a part of the territory of the former Korochansk uyezd of the Kursk province. Since June 13, 1934 the district was part of Kursk Oblast, since January 6, 1954 - part of Belgorod Oblast. On February 1, 1963, Korocha Rural District was formed, comprising Korocha town.

Since January 1, 2006 in accordance with the Law of the Belgorod region from 20.12.2004 No. 159 the municipal formation "Korocha district" was given the status of the municipal district. On the territory of the region there are 23 municipal formations: 1 urban and 22 rural settlements.

On January 24, 2024, a Russian Air Force Ilyushin Il-76 crashed in Korochansky with 65 prisoners of war from the Russian invasion of Ukraine. All 65 people were killed.
