= Korocha =

Korocha Короча
- Town
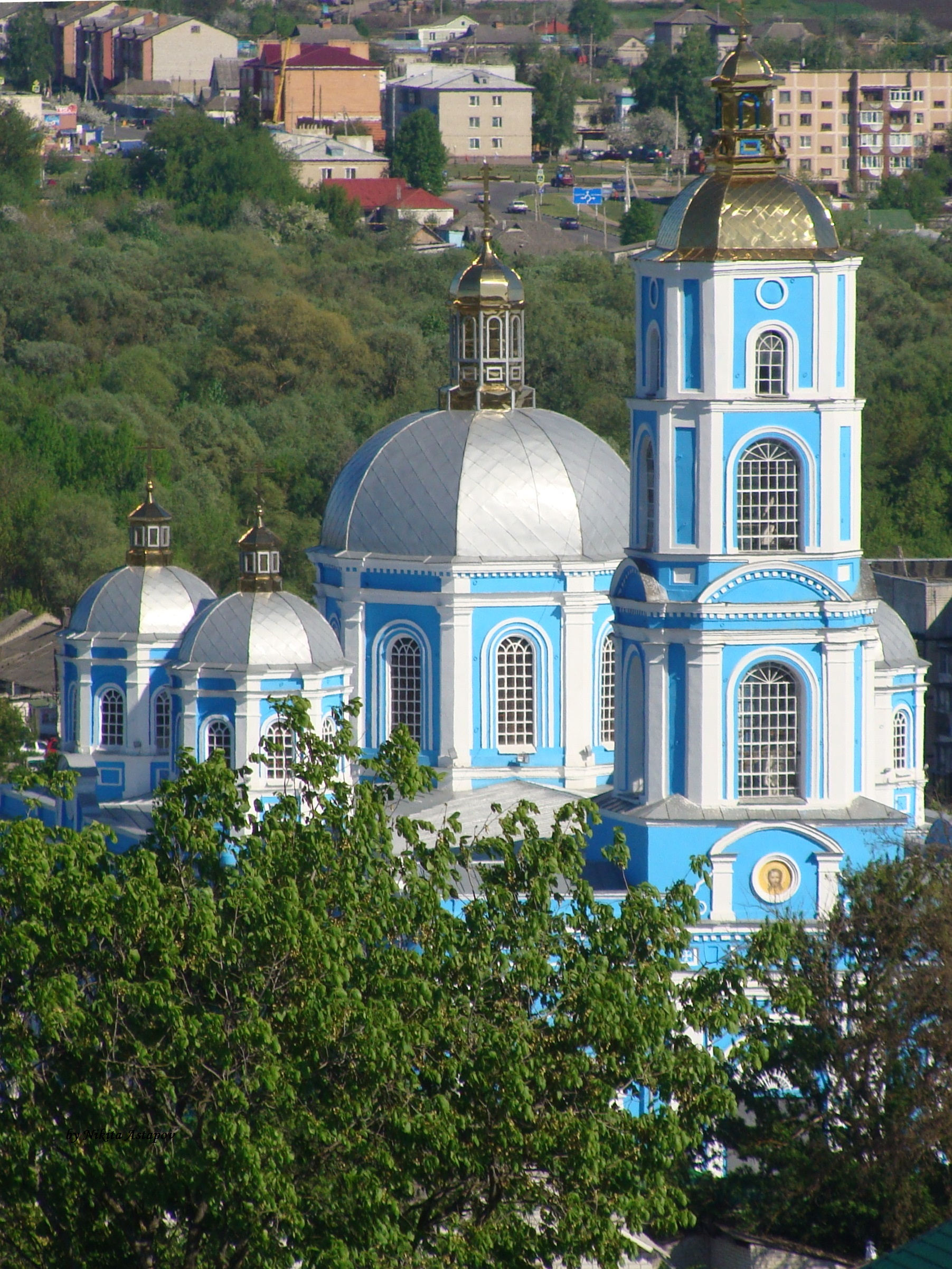

- Flag Coat of arms
- Interactive map of Korocha
- Location of Korocha Korocha (Belgorod Oblast)
- Coordinates: 50°49′N 37°12′E
- Country: Russia
- Federal subject: Belgorod Oblast
- Administrative district: Korochansky District
- Known since: 1638
- Town status since: 1708
- Elevation: 150 m (490 ft)

Population (2010 Census)
  - Total: 5,877
  - Estimate (2021): 5,623 (−4.3%)

Administrative status
  - Capital of: Korochansky District

Municipal status
  - Municipal district: Korochansky Municipal District
  - Urban settlement: Korocha Urban Settlement
  - Capital of: Korochansky Municipal District, Korocha Urban Settlement
- Time zone: UTC+3 (MSK)
- Postal codes: 309210, 309249
- Dialing code: +7 47231c
- OKTMO ID: 14640101001

Korocha (Russian: Коро́ча) is a town and the administrative center of Korochansky District in Belgorod Oblast, Russia, located on the right bank of the Korocha River (Seversky Donets' tributary), 57 kilometers (35 mi) northeast of Belgorod, the administrative center of the oblast. Population: 5,623 (2021 census); 5,877 (2010 census); 6,046 (2002 census); 5,755 (1989 Soviet census).

== History ==
What is now Korocha has been known since 1638 as a small Russian fortress built as a part of the defense line between modern Belgorod, Tambov, and Ulyanovsk against the Crimean Tatars. At the time, it was the south frontier of the Tsardom of Russia. It was first named Krasny gorod na Koroche, which was then shortened to Korocha. It was granted town status in 1708. Until the early 20th century, Korocha remained the main town in the region but then it lost its importance. During World War II, Korocha was occupied by the German Wehrmacht on 1 July 1942.

On 4 February 1943 Hungarian armoured units and the German 168th Infantry Division retreated to the town. On the morning of 6 February 1943 Soviet troops attempted to liberate the town, but a Hungarian counter-attack drove them back by the late afternoon. At 4:45am the next morning soviet troops again attacked the town. Intense combat followed, with two Hungarian 40M Nimród Self-propelled anti-aircraft guns holding off the 400-500 Soviet attackers. At 6:30am the German forces from the 168th retreated, with the Hungarians retreating later in the day. The Hungarian armoured units lost both Nimróds (which were set ablaze by the crews to avoid capture) and the last T-38 (which was destroyed be a Soviet T-34. After the battle the Hungarian armoured forces had only two vehicles left.

The town was fully liberated on the night of 7 February 1943 by the Voronezh Front of the Red Army during the Third Battle of Kharkov.

== Administrative and municipal status ==
Within the framework of administrative divisions, Korocha serves as the administrative center of Korochansky District, to which it is directly subordinated. As a municipal division, the town of Korocha, together with two rural localities in Korochansky District, is incorporated within Korochansky Municipal District as Korocha Urban Settlement.

== Notable people ==
Mathematician Aleksei Pogorelov was born in Korocha.
