= Aleksandr Bondovsky =

Soviet Major General

Aleksandr Vasilyevich Bondovsky
- Bondovsky, c. 1945
- Born: 25 December 1896; Penza, Russian Empire
- Died: 15 March 1970 (aged 73) Ivanovo, Soviet Union
- Allegiance: Russian Empire; Russian SFSR; Soviet Union
- Branch: Imperial Russian Army; Red Army
- Service years: 1915–1917; 1918–1947
- Rank: Major general
- Commands: 85th Rifle Division; 324th Rifle Division
- Conflicts: World War I; Russian Civil War; World War II
- Awards: Order of Lenin; Order of the Red Banner (2); Order of the Red Star (2)

Aleksandr Vasilyevich Bondovsky (Russian: Александр Васильевич Бондовский; 25 December 1896 – 15 March 1970) was a Red Army major general.

Bondovsky fought in World War I as a junior officer and was wounded during the Russian Civil War. He held command positions between the wars and rose to regimental and then division command during the 1930s. At the outbreak of Operation Barbarossa in June 1941 he commanded the 85th Rifle Division, which was destroyed in Belarus during the first weeks of the war. Escaping the encirclement on foot, he was captured twice but slipped out of prisoner columns moving to the rear. Bondovsky did not reach Soviet lines until December and after being cleared by an investigation served as an instructor at a training course. He returned to the front in late 1943 as a deputy corps commanded and soon received command of the 324th Rifle Division in fighting in eastern Belarus. In early 1944 he was severely wounded in action and after months of hospitalization returned to the training course. He retired soon after the war ended for health reasons.

== Early life, World War I, and Russian Civil War ==
A Russian, Bondovsky was born on 25 December 1896 in Penza and graduated from a gymnasium school. He was mobilized into the Imperial Russian Army in August 1915 and became a one-year volunteer of the second category due to his relatively rare secondary education. He was sent to the 28th Reserve Battalion at Chuguyev camp, later moved to Kharkov. From January 1916 he was a junker at the 4th Moscow Warrant Officer School. After graduating from the school in April, Bondovsky served with the 186th Reserve Regiment at Narovchat as a junior officer of a company and platoon commander.

Sent to Yamburg with a march battalion in July, he served on the Northern Front with the 174th Romny Infantry Regiment of the 44th Infantry Division of the 12th Army as junior officer of a company, rising to half-company commander. Bondovsky completed a machine gun instruction course under the army headquarters in 1916 and fought in the Battle of Riga, going on leave in late November 1917.

Bondovsky served as a militsiya supervisor at the 3rd Militsiya Station in Penza beginning in February 1918. Drafted into the Red Army in July, he was appointed a company commander in the 3rd Rifle Regiment (later renumbered as the 246th) and with the 28th Rifle Division fought on the Eastern Front against the Orenburg Cossacks of Alexander Dutov and the forces of Alexander Kolchak. While serving as acting battalion commander in battle on 26 January 1919 at the village of Yepishino-Golukhino, west of Kungur, Bondovsky was wounded, and until July hospitalized at the Penza Evacuation Center. After recovering, he was appointed a platoon commander with the 3rd Machine Gun Commanders' Course at Penza, and with a cadet detachment from the course fought in the suppression of the uprising of Filipp Mironov in Saransk and Saratov Governorate.

From September 1919 he served as detachment chief, assistant machine gun company commander, and machine gun company commander with the detachment of cadets drawn from the Penza and Kursk Commanders' Courses. Before the Orel–Kursk operation, the detachment joined the 80th Kursk Regiment of the 9th Rifle Division. In the latter, Bondovsky became a machine gun company commander. In the operation, he fought in battles against the Kornilov Division of the Volunteer Army. After the end of the offensive, the detachment returned to the courses and Bondovsky was appointed commander of a half-company of the course.

== Interwar period ==
After the end of the war, Bondovsky served as a company commander with the 112th Infantry Commanders Course at Penza from December 1920, transferring to serve in the same position at the 19th Samara Infantry School in January 1923. After the disbandment of the school, he served in the same position with the Combined Muslim Commanders Courses, which were renamed the 6th Combined Kazan Tatar-Bashkir Commanders School in October. Bondovsky transferred to the 3rd Rifle Regiment of the 1st Kazan Rifle Division of the Volga Military District in December 1923, serving successively as a platoon and battalion commander and as assistant regimental commander for supply.

Following his completion of the Vystrel course in 1926, he was appointed assistant commander for personnel of the 101st Rifle Regiment of the 34th Rifle Division at Syzran in December 1927 and in November 1929 transferred to take the same position with the 170th Rifle Regiment of the 57th Rifle Division at Sverdlovsk. Bondovsky became commander of the 193rd Rifle Regiment of the newly formed 65th Rifle Division at Tyumen in May 1931, transferring to Ishim in June 1932 to command the 311th Rifle Regiment of the division. For organizing successful combat and political training in the regiment, he was awarded the Order of the Red Star on 16 August 1936.

Taking command of the 85th Rifle Division of the Ural Military District in August 1939, Bondovsky was promoted to kombrig on 4 November. His division, which was raised to wartime strength, was sent to the Northwestern Front to participate in the Winter War in January and February 1940, but did not arrive before the war ended. The 85th returned to the district and in June relocated to the area of Sebezh, then to Minsk, where it was assigned to the Western Special Military District. Bondovsky became a major general on 4 June when the Red Army introduced general officer ranks. The division eventually was placed under the direct control of the 3rd Army of the Western Front, in what was effectively the army reserve.

== World War II ==
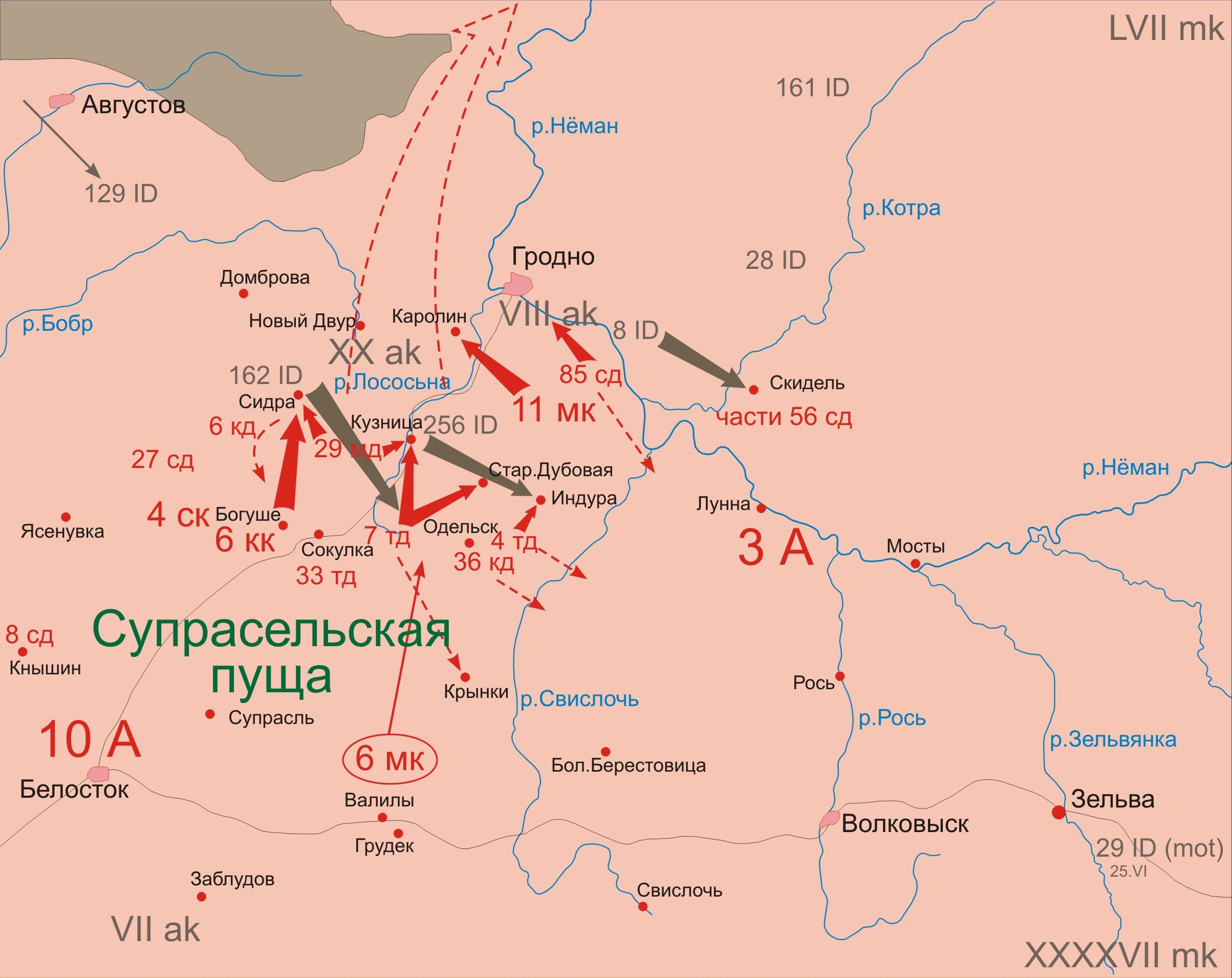
Actions in the vicinity of Grodno, 24–25 June 1941

When Operation Barbarossa began on 22 June, Bondovsky was at the division headquarters discussing ammunition resupply with his chief of artillery when he heard the sound of German bombs and the explosions that followed, though his headquarters and that of the army were unscathed. Later that day, he was summoned to the army headquarters to receive instructions for the defense of the line of the Lasosna from the mouth of the river to Gnevenizishchna, west of Grodno, which became the 3rd Army's rear position. Until 23 June the 85th defended these positions, then retreated to the line of the Neman and Svislach and further to Grodno. The division covered the retreat of the 11th Mechanized Corps towards Novogrudok and after battles against German troops crossing the Shchara retreated to the area of Venzovets and Dzyadlovo in the fighting, during which it was encircled. Avoiding the battle, the division bypassed Novogrudok from the southeast via Raytsa, Yeremechi, the Naliboki forest, and Rubeksevichi. They met units of the 21st Rifle Corps on 4 July and the Soviet commanders decided to attempt to breakout from the encirclement south of Minsk at Rudensk.

From 5 July, the remnants of the 85th moved east towards Osipovichi and Smyk, then continued, splitting into small groups. Bondovsky attempted to organize resistance until realizing the futility of these efforts on 17 July, exchanging his uniform for civilian clothes with five others. They moved east on foot but were captured on 21 July near the village of Maleyevka; Bondovsky's rank was not noticed by the Germans. After five days being marched to the rear with a prisoner of war column, he slipped away at the village of Dubinka together with a lieutenant. From 16 September Bondovsky continued alone, and on 21 October he was again captured in the area of Koloshino while attempting to cross the Desna. Escaping the same night, he continued in the general direction of Novgorod-Seversky, Yampol, Glukhov, Rylsk, and Kursk. Bypassing these cities, on the night of 24 December Bondovsky reached Soviet lines in the sector of the 333rd Rifle Regiment of the 6th Rifle Division south of Dolgaya in the area of Kryukovo northeast of Kursk.

An investigation by intelligence officers from the special section of the division did not find compromising evidence in Bondovsky's record, and as a result he was placed at the disposal of the Southwestern Front military council on 28 December, who were notified that he had been briefly captured. As officers who had escaped from captivity were suspected of being German agents, he did not initially receive a combat command and in early February was sent to the Main Personnel Directorate in Moscow. Bondovsky was assigned as a tactics instructor at the Vystrel course in April 1942 and in July became chief of a class of the course.

In late November 1943 he returned to the front at his own request as deputy commander of the 121st Rifle Corps of the 50th Army in eastern Belarus, fighting in the Gomel–Rechitsa Offensive. Bondovsky became commander of the 324th Rifle Division in December, leading it in the battles for a bridgehead on the western bank of the Pronia, in which it fought in actions for the settlements of Dalnye Borki and Podlinovka. In early January 1944, after reaching the line of the Ukhlat in the area of Vetrinka and Somlitsa, the 324th went on the defensive. By 21 February, having handed over its sector, the division relocated to the east bank of the Dnieper in the area of Selets and Kholopeyev. On 23 February it crossed the Dnieper in the area of Adamenka south of Bykhov at the beginning of the Rogachev–Zhlobin Offensive. On the same day he was severely wounded during a German artillery bombardment while conducting reconnaissance, and lost his right leg. Bondovsky, who received the Order of the Red Banner for his leadership of the 324th, was evacuated to a hospital and after recovering in September returned to the Vystrel course as chief of a class, where he spent the rest of the war.

== Postwar ==
After the end of the war Bondovsky continued in the same position until March 1946, when he became a senior tactics instructor at the course. From September 1946 he was chief of the military department at the Poltava Pedagogical Institute. Medically retired on 21 May 1947, Bondovsky died in Ivanovo on 15 March 1970. He was buried in a cemetery in that city.

== Awards and honors ==
Bondovsky was a recipient of the following decorations:

- Order of Lenin
- Order of the Red Banner (2)
- Order of the Red Star (2)
- Medals
- Honorary weapon

A street in Grodno is named for him.
