= 324th Rifle Division =

324th Rifle Division (August 1941 – May 6, 1946)
- Active: 1941–1946
- Country: Soviet Union
- Branch: Red Army
- Type: Infantry
- Engagements: Battle of Moscow; Zhizdra Offensive; Operation Kutuzov; Battle of Smolensk (1943); Battle of the Dniepr; Rogachev-Zhlobin Offensive; Operation Bagration; Vistula-Oder Offensive; East Prussian Offensive; Battle of Königsberg
- Decorations: Order of the Red Banner
- Battle honours: Upper Dniepr

Commanders
- Notable commanders: Maj. Gen. Nikolai Ivanovich Kiryukhin; Major Ivan Yakovlevich Kravchenko; Maj. Gen. Nikolai Timofeevich Shcherbakov; Maj. Gen. Mikhail Yemilyaonovich Yerokhin; Col. Ernest Zhanovich Sedulin; Maj. Gen. Aleksandr Bondovsky; Col. Ivan Kornilovich Kazak

The 324th Rifle Division was a standard Soviet infantry division of the Red Army during World War II. It was formed as part of the massive mobilization of August 1941, and first saw action in early December in the counteroffensive west of Moscow. During 1942 and into 1943 it saw limited action on a relatively quiet sector of the front north of Bryansk, before joining a limited offensive in February. During the general offensives of that summer, the division fought in the drive past Smolensk, and made a forced crossing of the upper Dniepr River. The 324th played a limited role in Operation Bagration, but distinguished itself in the fighting in East Prussia in 1945, sufficiently to be awarded the Order of the Red Banner. During the course of the war the men and women of the division served under no fewer than nine commanding officers.

== Formation ==
The division began forming in August 1941, at Cheboksary in the Moscow Military District. Its order of battle was as follows:

- 1091st Rifle Regiment
- 1093rd Rifle Regiment
- 1095th Rifle Regiment
- 887th Artillery Regiment

While still just partially complete, the 324th was reassigned to the Volga Military District in October. At this time its personnel were noted as being 90 percent Russian nationality. It was assigned to 10th (Reserve) Army in the Reserve of the Supreme High Command. Its first recorded commanding officer, Maj. Gen. Nikolai Ivanovich Kiryukhin, was appointed on December 1. It would go into its first action in 10th Army in Western Front just days later.

=== Battle of Moscow ===
The Army was deployed in the last week of November west of the Oka River, downstream from Kashira, to defend both Kolomna and Ryazan from the German 2nd Panzer Army. On November 29 the division was noted as lacking its full complement of heavy machine guns, Shpagin (12.7mm calibre) machine guns, anti-aircraft weapons, mortars, howitzers, communications and engineering equipment. Orders were received on December 5 for the counteroffensive to begin the next day.

The 324th began from a line from Slobodka to Pecherniki, and was directed towards Stalinogorsk, facing rearguards of the German 29th and 10th Motorized Divisions and 18th Panzer Division, plus other small infantry units. The division was roughly in the center of the Army's front, which was advancing more slowly than planned. On the morning of December 11 Army commander Lt. Gen. Filipp Golikov issued orders that the leading divisions, including the 324th, reach the line Uzlovaya station - Bogoroditsk - Kuzovka over the next 24 hours. On December 13 the division fought its way into Lyutorichi on the Don River and continued to the west. By the end of December 17 units of the division had crossed the Upa River along the Naumovka - Myasnovka sector. At this point the second stage of the Tula operation by 10th Army was completed. The next stage of the advance began on December 20, towards Belyov and Kozelsk. The 324th was in the Army's second echelon, concentrated in the area Lyapishchevo - Polozovo - Rzhavo. From December 21 - 24 the Army overcame the resistance of small enemy rearguards. By the end of this period the 324th had reached the area of Krasnokole - Sonino - Kostino. there were almost no enemy units in front of the division because 1st Guards Cavalry Corps was operating ahead of it. By late of December 26 it had reached Kudrino - Snykhovo; in 20 days it had advanced a distance of about 200km.

During the latter half of December 28 the 324th and the 239th Rifle Division made a fighting advance to the line Kudrino - Davydovo, and by the next day had reached the Kozelsk area, where they linked up with 1st Guards Cavalry. From January 1 - 5, 1942, the two rifle divisions fought to liberate Sukhinichi, but were unsuccessful. Following this 10th Army command decided to blockade the city with the 324th, two companies of the 239th, and a battalion of the 323rd Rifle Division. During the day on January 8 units of the division went over to the attack on one sector in the Sukhinichi area, and took several buildings in the southern and southwestern outskirts, but were then stopped by heavy enemy fire from fortified stone houses. German Army Group Center began to receive reinforcements from occupied France which allowed them to launch a counterattack to relieve its besieged troops on January 18. Part of the Sukhinichi garrison was extracted by the German relief force and the town was finally liberated on January 29. Fighting by both sides persisted into February with mixed success.

== Into Western Russia and Belarus ==
At the end of January 1942, 324th was reassigned to 16th Army, still in Western Front. After the winter fighting ended, this sector, north of Bryansk, remained relatively inactive for the balance of the year. On March 9, General Kiryukin handed over his command to Major Ivan Yakovlevich Kravchenko; Kiryukhin would go on to command the 24th Rifle Corps and become a Hero of the Soviet Union. Major Kravchenko had been named a Hero of the Soviet Union in 1940 for his actions during the Winter War with Finland. While leading the division he was mortally wounded near the village of Klintsy and died on April 8. Maj. Gen. Nikolai Timofeevich Shcherbakov held command from April 9 to July 10, when Maj. Gen. A. A. Boreiko took over for about six weeks before in turn handing over to Maj. Gen. Mikhail Yemilyanovich Yerokhin on August 29.

Following the Soviet victory at Stalingrad in early 1943, the STAVKA made every effort to make the local success more general, and 16th Army was ordered to attack the German defenses north of Zhizdra on February 22, 1943, in conjunction with other attacks by 61st and 3rd Armies, attempting to capture the salient around Oryol held by 2nd Panzer Army. The 324th, on the far left, was one of six rifle divisions of its Army that made up a shock group backed by three tank brigades, with 9th Tank Corps in reserve. In the event, rain, mud-clogged roads and skillful German resistance brought the advance to a halt after gains of 7km at most, and the tank corps was never committed.

In April, 16th Army became the 11th Guards Army, and the 324th was moved to 50th Army on April 19, where it would remain for the duration; this army was also in Western Front. On April 27, General Yerokhin handed his command over to Col. Ernest Zhanovich Sedulin; Yerokhin would go on to command 81st Rifle Corps before returning to the division. In August, 50th Army was transferred to Bryansk Front, and when that Front was dissolved in October, joined Central Front, which was soon renamed Belorussian Front. On November 25, Colonel Sedulin was replaced in command by Lt. Col. A. M. Osadchii and on the same day 50th Army launched an offensive from its positions along the Pronya River just north of Propoysk which penetrated the German front as much as 30km over the next 15 days, finally approaching the Dniepr River near Novyi Bykhov. The 324th was in the first echelon when the Army went over to the defense. Colonel Osadchii had handed the division over to Maj. Gen. Aleksandr Bondovsky in the midst of this operation on December 2.

On January 4, 1944, 3rd Army, to the south of the 50th, launched a new offensive in the direction of Bykhov; for this effort the 324th was attached to that Army's 80th Rifle Corps. A daring night raid by ski troops had disrupted the headquarters of the defending German 267th Infantry Division, and 80th Corps quickly penetrated to a depth of 5km before reaching the German Winter Defense Line along the Ukhliast River. The next day the division reverted to 50th Army control, but despite the help of the 110th and 413th Rifle Divisions was unable to crack this new line.

Belorussian Front became 1st Belorussian Front in February, and the 324th was assigned to 121st Rifle Corps. In the last week of that month the division took part in the Rogachev - Zhlobin Offensive:

"On the morning of February 22 [50th Army's] left wing went over to an offensive along the Mshatoe Swamp and Adamenka line... forced the Dniepr River, penetrated the enemy's prepared defensive belt on the right [western] bank of the river, and by February 29 reached a front... [that threatened] the flank and rear of the enemy's entire Mogilev - Bykhov grouping."

Beginning on March 25 the division and its Corps took part in an offensive, along with forces of 10th Army, to reduce or eliminate the bridgehead east of the Dniepr still held by German 4th Army, but this effort made only limited gains and was halted on March 31. On the night of April 5 the 324th took over the positions held by the 82nd Rifle Division on the southern outskirts of Krasnitsa. 50th Army remained in this Front until April, when it was transferred to 2nd Belorussian Front. On April 22 Col. Ivan Kornilovich Kazak was appointed to command, which he would hold until October. As of May 1 the division was reassigned to 19th Rifle Corps, where it served in the opening stages of Operation Bagration. The 50th was holding a wide sector, but also had orders to assist the much stronger 49th Army in its assaults on the German-held city of Mogilev. On the morning of June 24, 19th Rifle Corps penetrated the German 267th Infantry Division's line at Ludchitsa, but this attack was contained by 1100 hrs. On June 28 the 324th helped to force a crossing of the Dniepr near the city of Shklov and soon received the battle honor "Upper Dniepr" for this accomplishment:

"SHKLOV... By order of the Supreme High Command, units that distinguished themselves during the crossing of the Dniepr and the capture of the cities of Mogilev, Shklov and Bykhov are given the names of Upper Dniepr and Mogilev... 324th Rifle Division (Colonel Kazak, Ivan Kornilovich)... By order of the Supreme High Command of June 28, 1944, and a commendation in Moscow, the troops who took part in the battles for the crossing of the Dniepr and for the liberation of Shklov and other cities are given a salute of 20 artillery volleys from 224 guns.

After the liberation of Mogilev, on July 1, 19th Rifle Corps crossed the Berezina River north of Brodets; following this, 50th Army cut off the escape of the broken German 4th Army between Berezino and Chervin, and then headed for Minsk.

On July 9 the division became a separate division under Army command. It was tasked, along with 38th Rifle Corps and five other separate rifle divisions, plus three NKVD border regiments, to methodically comb through the forested areas east of Minsk with light air support. This was a search and destroy mission against enemy groups that had not yet surrendered. During this operation, which ended on July 13, the 324th eliminated a group of about 2,000 men in the Bolshoi Trostenets - Yelnitsa - Apchak area led by General Engel, the commander of the 45th Infantry Division. Following this, in August was reassigned to 81st Rifle Corps.

== East Prussian Campaign ==
Colonel Kazak was replaced when General Yerokhin returned to the division on October 9, but this was temporary as Kazak returned on December 23 and would continue in command for the duration of the war. At the outset of the Vistula-Oder Offensive in January 1945, 324th was part of 69th Rifle Corps, where it would remain for the duration. 50th Army was deployed on the right flank of its Front, and had a defensive role at the outset. It was not ordered to advance until January 17. By February 8, elements of the Army had captured Heilsberg. The next day 50th Army, now with just six rifle divisions, including the 324th, was ordered to be transferred to 3rd Belorussian Front, where it would remain for the duration. 50th Army was reassigned to 3rd Belorussian Front in February, and would remain in that Front for the duration.

On March 8, the 69th Corps was ordered to advance by way of Preussisch Eylau to concentrate in the area of Trutenau - Praddau. At the beginning of April the Corps was defending with just two divisions along a broad front through the northeastern outskirts of Königsberg, but the actual assault was to be carried out by the 81st and 124th Rifle Corps, which were more concentrated. On April 5, the day before the final battle for the city began, the division was awarded the Order of the Red Banner for the capture of Biała Piska and other nearby towns, and its general record of service.

== Postwar ==
When the fighting ended, the soldiers of the division shared the full title of 324th Rifle, Upper Dniepr, Order of the Red Banner Division (Russian: 324-я стрелковая Верхнеднепровская Краснознамённая дивизия), and three of its former commanders were, or had become, Heroes of the Soviet Union.

The division was withdrawn along with the 69th Rifle Corps to Luhansk Oblast in the Kharkov Military District. The 324th Rifle Division was disbanded on or around May 6, 1946, along with the corps.

== Sources and references ==
=== Bibliography ===
- Feskov, V.I.; Golikov, V.I.; Kalashnikov, K.A.; Slugin, S.A. (2013). Вооруженные силы СССР после Второй Мировой войны: от Красной Армии к Советской [The Armed Forces of the USSR after World War II: From the Red Army to the Soviet: Part 1 Land Forces] (in Russian). Tomsk: Scientific and Technical Literature Publishing. ISBN 9785895035306.
- Main Personnel Directorate of the Ministry of Defense of the Soviet Union (1964). Командование корпусного и дивизионного звена советских вооруженных сил периода Великой Отечественной войны 1941 – 1945 гг [Commanders of Corps and Divisions in the Great Patriotic War, 1941–1945] (in Russian). Moscow: Frunze Military Academy. p. 263
- Affairs Directorate of the Ministry of Defense of the Soviet Union (1967). Сборник приказов РВСР, РВС СССР, НКО и Указов Президиума Верховного Совета СССР о награждении орденами СССР частей, соединениий и учреждений ВС СССР. Часть II. 1945 - 1966 гг [Collection of orders of the RVSR, RVS USSR and NKO on awarding orders to units, formations and establishments of the Armed Forces of the USSR. Part II. 1945–1966] (PDF) (in Russian). Moscow. Archived from the original (PDF) on 2019-07-06.
