= Kozhevnikov =

Kozhevnikov (masculine, Кожевников) or Kozhevnikova (masculine genitive or feminine, Кожевникова) is a Russian patronymic surname literally meaning "currier's (son)". The surname may refer to the following notable people:

== Kozhevnikov ==
- Aleksandr Kozhevnikov (disambiguation), multiple people
- Alexandre Kojève (1902–1968), Russian-born French intellectual, born Kozhevnikov
- Aleksei Kozhevnikov (1836–1902), Russian physician
- Fyodor Kozhevnikov (1893–1998), Soviet legal expert
- Grigorii Kozhevnikov (1866–1933), Russian entomologist
- Innokentiy Kozhevnikov (1879–1931), Russian Red Army commander in the Russian Civil War
- Kirill Kozhevnikov (disambiguation), multiple people
- Oleksandr Kozhevnikov (born 2000), Ukrainian footballer
- Pyotr Kozhevnikov (born 1927), Soviet athlete
- Sergey Kozhevnikov (born 1970), Russian middle-distance runner
- Vadim Kozhevnikov (1909–1984), Soviet writer
- Yakov Kozhevnikov (1903–1983), Soviet general

== Kozhevnikova ==
- Ekaterina Kozhevnikova (born 1954), Russian composer
- Galina Kozhevnikova (1974–2011), Russian journalist
- Mariya Kozhevnikova (born 1985), Russian actress and politician
- Nadezhda Kozhevnikova (born 1949), Russian writer, daughter of Vadim Kozhevnikov
- Yelizaveta Kozhevnikova (born 1973), Russian freestyle skier
