= Nikolay Kiryukhin =

Soviet Army lieutenant general

Nikolay Ivanovich Kiryukhin
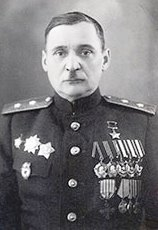
- Kiryukhin, c. 1945
- Born: 2 August 1896; Moscow, Russian Empire
- Died: 13 December 1953 (aged 57) Moscow, Soviet Union
- Buried: Novodevichy Cemetery
- Allegiance: Russian Empire; Russian SFSR; Soviet Union
- Branch: Imperial Russian Army; Red Army (Soviet Army from 1946)
- Service years: 1916–1918; 1918–1953
- Rank: Lieutenant general
- Commands: 74th Rifle Division; 14th Rifle Corps; 55th Rifle Corps; 324th Rifle Division; 16th Army; 9th Guards Rifle Corps; 20th Army; 24th Rifle Corps
- Conflicts: World War I; Russian Civil War; Polish–Soviet War; World War II
- Awards: Hero of the Soviet Union; Order of Lenin (2); Order of the Red Banner (4); Order of Suvorov, 2nd class; Order of Bogdan Khmelnitsky, 2nd class; Order of the Red Star

Nikolay Ivanovich Kiryukhin (Russian: Никола́й Ива́нович Кирю́хин; 2 August 1896 – 13 December 1953) was a Soviet Army lieutenant general and a Hero of the Soviet Union.

A prewar Bolshevik, Kiryukhin was drafted into the Imperial Russian Army during World War I. He served as a commissar in the 24th Rifle Division during the Russian Civil War and moved to command positions before fighting in the Polish–Soviet War. Kiryukhin held a series of command and staff positions during the interwar period, rising to division and corps command in the late 1930s. After Operation Barbarossa began, he took command of the new 324th Rifle Division and led it in the Battle of Moscow. Kiryukhin commanded the 20th Army during Operation Mars and was relieved of command for failing to achieve objectives. From early 1943 to August 1944 he commanded the 24th Rifle Corps, being made a Hero of the Soviet Union for his leadership in the Battle of the Dnieper. Relieved again during the Lvov–Sandomierz Offensive, Kiryukhin ended the war as an army deputy commander. He retired in the early 1950s.

== Early life, World War I, and Russian Civil War ==
A Russian, Kiryukhin was born on 2 August 1896 in Moscow, the son of a janitor. Completing three grades at the city school, he worked in a printing house as a typesetter and was arrested for being a member of the Bolsheviks in November 1913. After being imprisoned for a month, Kiryukhin was expelled to Tula, where he continued to work as a typesetter. In November 1914 he was arrested again and exiled to Yeniseysk Governorate.

Despite his political affiliation, Kiryukhin was drafted into the Imperial Russian Army during World War I in September 1916 and sent to the 216th Reserve Infantry Regiment at Kozlov. Transferred to the 2nd Reserve Machine Gun Regiment at Petrograd in December, he was sent to the Romanian Front with a march company in September 1917. After serving with the 7th Rifle Regiment of the 2nd Rifle Division, Kiryukhin was demobilized in February 1918 with the rank of feldfebel, returning to Moscow to work in a warehouse of the Central Worker's Cooperative.

Drafted into the Red Army in June 1918 during the Russian Civil War, Kiryukhin was sent to the 3rd Moscow Rifle Regiment, fighting in the suppression of the Yaroslavl rebellion. With the regiment, he departed for the Eastern Front in August. Arriving at Simbirsk, Kiryukhin became a machine gunner in the 1st Simbirsk Consolidated Infantry Division. From October he served as commissar of the 1st Simbirsk Rifle Regiment, which was redesignated as the 214th Rifle Regiment a month later while the division became the 24th Rifle Division. With the division, Kiryukhin fought in battles against the White troops of Alexander Kolchak in Siberia from Simbirsk to Aktyubinsk.

Kiryukhin briefly became assistant commissar of the 72nd Brigade of the division in December 1919 before returning to the 214th Rifle Regiment a month later to command a company and then a battalion. He was transferred west with the division for the Polish–Soviet War, during which the 24th advanced on Mozyr and later Lutsk. During the war and after its end the division also engaged in fighting against the Ukrainian People's Army and the army of Stanisław Bułak-Bałachowicz. Kiryukhin was awarded the Order of the Red Banner in 1921.

== Interwar period ==
After the end of the war, Kiryukhin remained with the 24th Division for several years, commanding a battalion of the 213th Rifle Regiment from July 1921. A year later, he became a company commander in the 71st Rifle Regiment as the Red Army demobilized and the division was reorganized to consist of three regiments. From March 1923 he served successively as an assistant battalion commander and battalion commander in the 70th Rifle Regiment. Kiryukhin began studies at the Frunze Military Academy in August 1924 and graduated from it in July 1927. Posted to the 102nd Rifle Regiment of the 34th Rifle Division, stationed in the Volga Military District, as regimental assistant commander for personnel, Kiryukhin temporarily served as division chief of staff between June and September 1928. In May 1929 he was appointed commander and military commissar of the 3rd Rifle Regiment of the 1st Kazan Rifle Division before graduating from the Moscow Course of Improvement for Higher Officers (KUVNAS) in 1930.

Kiryukhin became chief of the 4th Department of the Artillery Directorate in July 1930 and deputy chief of the Small Arms Directorate of the Main Artillery Directorate in June 1932. Completing the Course of Technical Improvement for Commanders at the Military Academy of Mechanization and Motorization between March 1934 and January 1935, he was sent to the North Caucasus Military District to serve as commander and commissar of the 66th Rifle Regiment of the 22nd Rifle Division. Kiryukhin became commander of the 74th Rifle Division of the district in June 1937, then transferred to the Kharkov Military District in February 1938 to command the 14th Rifle Corps of the Kharkov Military District in February 1938. For the twentieth anniversary of the Red Army, he was awarded the Order of the Red Star. In August 1939 he became commander of the 55th Rifle Corps before transferring to the Moscow Military District to become inspector of infantry in September 1940.

== World War II ==
After Operation Barbarossa began, Kiryukhin fulfilled the duties of the chief of the district combat training department. In late July he was appointed commander of the 324th Rifle Division, forming in Cheboksary. In early November the division joined the 10th Army and was relocated to Inza before being sent to the Western Front with the army in early December. Kiryukhin led the division in the Soviet counteroffensive during the Battle of Moscow. His division captured Bogoroditsk during the Tula Offensive on 15 December and fought on the approaches to Sukhinichi, which was not captured until 29 January, during the Kaluga Offensive. The division then fought in battles to eliminate the German bridgehead on the north bank of the Zhizdra.

Appointed deputy commander of the 16th Army in early March, Kiryukhin temporarily commanded it from 7 and 8 March after army commander Lieutenant General Konstantin Rokossovsky was wounded during the attacks on Duminichi and Zhizdra. After Rokossovsky returned from the hospital, Kiryukhin resumed his role as deputy commander and in late May was appointed commander of the 9th Guards Rifle Corps, forming at Kozelsk. In July the corps joined the 61st Army of the Western Front and fought southwest of Bely, covering the Tula sector. Appointed commander of the 20th Army on 5 October, Kiryukhin led it in the unsuccessful attack towards Sychyovka during Operation Mars. Kiryukhin's army failed to break through German defenses and bogged down in the Vazuza bridgehead. As a result, he was relieved of command on 3 December by Georgy Zhukov, being replaced by Mikhail Khozin. Kiryukhin was appointed deputy commander of the 29th Army.

In February 1943 he accepted command of the 24th Rifle Corps, forming in Moscow. Kiryukhin commanded the corps in the Battle of Kursk and the Battle of the Dnieper, during which it fought as part of the 60th and 13th Armies of the Central and 1st Ukrainian Fronts. During the Battle of the Dnieper, the corps crossed the Dnieper and captured a strategic bridgehead north of Kiev. For "skillful command" of the corps in these operations, Kiryukhin was awarded the Order of Suvorov, 2nd class on 23 September and made a Hero of the Soviet Union on 17 October. He led the corps in the Zhitomir–Berdichev Offensive, the Rovno–Lutsk Offensive, the Proskurov–Chernovitsy Offensive, and the Lvov–Sandomierz Offensive from late 1943 to mid-1944.

As a result of his performance in the Lvov-Sandomierz Offensive, Kiryukhin was relieved of command on 17 August and in September appointed deputy commander of the 38th Army. In this capacity, he participated in the Battle of the Dukla Pass, the Western Carpathian Offensive, the Moravska Ostrava Offensive, and the Prague Offensive from late 1944 to May 1945. During the Western Carpathian Offensive, Kiryukhin commanded a mobile group of the army, which captured Nowy Sącz.

== Postwar ==
Kiryukhin continued as deputy commander of the army, withdrawn to the Carpathian Military District, after the war ended. In February 1946 he was transferred to serve in the same capacity with the 13th Army and from November 1948 to February 1949 was at disposal of the Commander-in-Chief of the Ground Forces before being appointed chief of the military department of the Moscow Engineering and Economic Institute. Retired due to illness on 25 July 1953, Kiryukhin died in Moscow later that year on 12 December, and was buried at the Novodevichy Cemetery in that city.

== Awards and honors ==
Kiryukhin was a recipient of the following decorations:

Hero of the Soviet Union (17 October 1943)
Order of Lenin, twice (17 October 1943, 21 February 1945)
Order of the Red Banner, four times (1921, 12 April 1942, 3 November 1944, 15 May 1951)
Order of Suvorov, 2nd class (23 November 1943)
Order of Bogdan Khmelnitsky, 2nd class (10 January 1944)
Order of the Red Star (22 February 1938)
Medal "For the Victory over Germany in the Great Patriotic War 1941–1945" (1945)
Jubilee Medal "XX Years of the Workers' and Peasants' Red Army" (1938)
Jubilee Medal "30 Years of the Soviet Army and Navy" (1948)
Order of the White Lion, 2nd class (Czechoslovakia)
War Cross 1939–1945 (Czechoslovakia)
