= Zembrė =

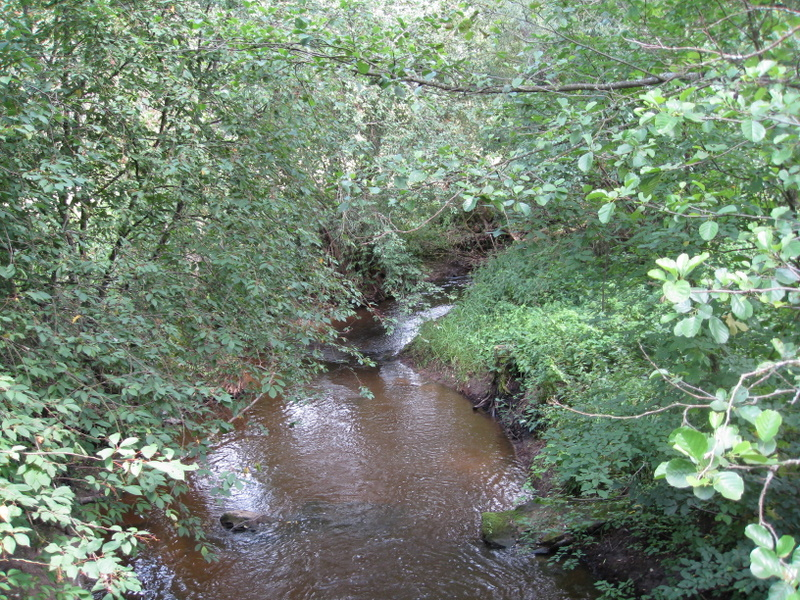

Location
- Country: Lithuania
- Region: Alytus district municipality, Alytus County

Physical characteristics
- Mouth: Neman
  - coordinates: 54°18′56″N 24°1′42″E
- Length: 18.5 km (11.5 mi)

Basin features
- Progression: Neman→ Baltic Sea
- Tributaries
  - left: Šumas
  - right: Vingutė, Gervinė

The Zembrė is a river of Alytus municipality, Alytus County, in southern Lithuania. It flows for 18.5 kilometres (11.5 mi).

It is a left tributary of the river Neman.
