= Servach =

Servach (Belarusian: Сэрвач, romanized: Servač; Russian: Сервеч, romanized: Servech) may refer to the following places in Belarus:

== Hydronyms ==
- Servach (Neman), left tributary of the Neman
- Servach (Viliya), right tributary of the Viliya
- Servach Lake, lake in Vitebsk Region

== Populated places ==
- Servach, Grodno Region, village in Grodno Region
- Servach, Minsk Region, village in Minsk Region
