= Ivan Yakovlevich Kravchenko =

Ukrainian Red Army major

- Born: 10 October [O.S. 27 September] 1905; Studeniki, Pereyaslavlsky Uyezd, Poltava Governorate, Russian Empire
- Died: 8 April 1942 (aged 36) near Klintsy, Duminichsky District, Kaluga Oblast, Soviet Union
- Buried: Donskoye Cemetery
- Allegiance: Soviet Union
- Branch: Red Army
- Service years: 1927–1942
- Rank: Major
- Commands: 324th Rifle Division
- Conflicts: Winter War; World War II (DOW)
- Awards: Hero of the Soviet Union; Order of Lenin

Ivan Yakovlevich Kravchenko (Russian: Ива́н Я́ковлевич Кра́вченко; 10 October [O.S. 27 September] 1905–8 April 1942) was a Ukrainian Red Army major and a Hero of the Soviet Union.

Kravchenko became a Red Army officer during the Interwar period, and was made a Hero of the Soviet Union for his actions during the Winter War, which included taking command of his battalion after his battalion commander was killed. He studied at the Frunze Military Academy after the Winter War, and after Operation Barbarossa began in June 1941 was appointed commander of a regiment. After the Soviet defeat in Operation Typhoon he took command of a sector of the defense of Tula before becoming a deputy division commander. Kravchenko was demoted to command of a regiment in early 1942 then appointed commander of the 324th Rifle Division. In April 1942, during the Rzhev–Vyazma Offensive, he died of wounds received while leading his troops.

== Early life and interwar military service ==
Kravchenko was born on 10 October 1905 in the village of Studeniki, Poltava Governorate. He graduated from fifth grade at the village school in 1919, working as a postman. In October 1927, he was drafted into the Red Army, becoming a cadet in the regimental school of the 138th Pereyaslavl Rifle Regiment of the 46th Rifle Division (a unit stationed in his home area as part of the Ukrainian Military District). After graduating from the regimental school in October 1928, he became a junior commander in the regiment. From October 1930 he studied at the Kiev Infantry School, and after his graduation in September 1931 Kravchenko returned to the 46th Division as commander of a rifle platoon in its 137th Rifle Regiment. He graduated from the Vystrel courses in 1933 and subsequently served as commander of a training platoon, and commander and political officer of a company. In May 1937, Kravchenko was transferred to command a company in the division's 136th Rifle Regiment. From March 1938 he served as chief of food supply for the 289th Rifle Regiment of the 97th Rifle Division, also stationed in the Kiev Military District. In November of that year Kravchenko became assistant commander and acting commander of a rifle battalion in the division's 69th Rifle Regiment. In this position he participated in the Soviet invasion of Poland.

== Winter War ==
In December 1939, Kravchenko, then a captain, was sent to the Northwestern Front, fighting in the Winter War against Finland. He became a company commander in the 245th Rifle Regiment of the 123rd Rifle Division, part of the 50th Rifle Corps of the 7th Army. Kravchenko fought in battles to break through the Mannerheim Line on the Karelian Isthmus. On 11 February 1940, after his battalion commander was killed, Kravchenko took command of the unit and led it in the breakthrough of the Hill 65.5 fortifications in the sectors of Muolaanjärvi and Karhula. In this action, his battalion was credited in Soviet accounts with capturing five pillboxes, seven bunkers, four anti-tank guns, two depots, as well as killing multiple Finnish soldiers. Kravchenko was seriously wounded in the fighting. He was awarded the title Hero of the Soviet Union and the Order of Lenin on 21 March in recognition of his actions.

== World War II ==
After leaving the hospital on 9 May, Kravchenko took command of the 245th Rifle Regiment. A month later, he was sent to study at the Frunze Military Academy, but only completed a short-term course due to the beginning of Operation Barbarossa, the German invasion of the Soviet Union, on 22 June 1941. On 25 July he was appointed commander of the 956th Rifle Regiment in the 299th Rifle Division, forming in the Orel Military District. By this time Kravchenko had been promoted to the rank of Major. At the end of August, the division joined the 50th Army of the Bryansk Front, fighting in defensive battles on the Desna River. In early October, the division was caught up in Operation Typhoon, the opening German attack of the Battle of Moscow, and fought in heavy fighting near Belyov and Bolkhov on the western bank of the Oka River. The 299th and the rest of the army were defeated and surrounded by the German attack, and retreated towards Tula.

On 29 October Kravchenko was appointed commander of the Southern Military Sector of the Tula defenses. He was one of the organizers of the defense of the city. On 1 November, the sector was disbanded and its troops transferred to the 154th Rifle Division under the command of Major General Yakov Fokanov, with Kravchenko as its deputy commander. As part of the 50th Army the division fought in the defense of Tula, the Tula Offensive and then in the Kaluga Offensive, part of the Soviet winter counteroffensive at Moscow. On 8 January 1942 Kravchenko was demoted to command the Tula Workers' Regiment.

On 8 March, after his superiors reconsidered his removal from command, Kravchenko was appointed commander of the 324th Rifle Division of the 16th Army, fighting as part of the Western Front in the Rzhev–Vyazma Offensive. Its units fought to capture German strongpoints at Kazar, Vyshilovo, Pesochnya, Lutovnya, and Chernyshino in Smolensk Oblast. After crossing the Zhizdra River, the division captured the strongpoint at Klintsy, but was pushed out by a German counterattack. Kravchenko decided to restore the situation, and went forward to the positions of the 1091st Rifle Regiment. While moving from the positions of that unit to a battery of the 887th Artillery Regiment he was seriously wounded and evacuated to a hospital, but died of wounds on 8 April. He was buried in the Donskoye Cemetery in Moscow.

== Personal life ==
Kravchenko married Yefrosinya and had two daughters: Lyubov and Nina. Yefrosinya and Lyubov are buried next to him, while Nina lived in Moscow as of 2011.
