= 85th Motor Rifle Division =

Infantry division of the Soviet Red Army

- Active: 1931–1941 (1st formation); 1941-1945 (2nd formation)
- Country: Soviet Union
- Branch: Soviet Army
- Type: Motorized infantry
- Engagements: World War II; Eastern Front; Siege of Leningrad; Operation Iskra; Leningrad–Novgorod offensive; Krasnoye Selo–Ropsha offensive; Pskov-Ostrovsk operation; Baltic offensive; Riga offensive
- Decorations: (1st formation); Order of the Red Banner (2nd formation)

The 85th Leningrad-Pavlovsk Red Banner Motor Rifle Division was a rifle division of the Soviet Red Army converted to a motorised formation in 1957. It was originally formed in 1941 as the 85th Rifle Division from the 2nd Guards People's Militia Division of the Leningrad People's Militia. The 85th Division was part of the Russian Ground Forces until it was reorganised as the 32nd Separate Motor Rifle Brigade in 2009. In 2016, the 32nd Separate Motor Rifle Brigade was reorganised as the 228th Motor Rifle Regiment of the 90th Guards Tank Division.

== World War II ==
=== 1st formation ===
The division was first formed in 1931 in Chelyabinsk. It was sent to Belorussian Special Military District in 1940. Assigned to 4th Rifle Corps, 3rd Army, Soviet Western Front on outbreak of war, under the command of Major General Aleksandr Bondovsky.

=== 2nd formation ===
After the division's first formation was destroyed, it was reformed in September 1941 during the Leningrad Strategic Defensive.

In early 1945, the division operated as part of the 122nd Rifle Corps in the 2nd Baltic Front. On 10 March, it marched into the area of Baloži and Kreili. It advanced alongside the 43rd and 46th Rifle Divisions on 22 March, capturing Slugi and Meiri, where it encountered strong German resistance and went on the defensive until 30 April, when it was relieved by the 43rd and 56th Rifle Divisions. The division transferred to a new defensive line between Mežvalde and Jaunmeži, relieving elements of the 11th Rifle Division.

By the end of 7 May, German forces began a retreat to the northwest. The division pursued the retreating troops towards Lubenka, Rumbenieka, and Ceri and by 17:00 on 8 May reached the line of Myzi Gayta, Yurdi, and Kauši, where at 18:00 they accepted the German surrender.

=== Commanders ===
- Major General Ivan Lyubovtsev (23 September 1941–29 January 1942)
- Colonel Nikolay Ugryumov (25 October–December 1941, acting)
- Lieutenant Colonel Aleksandr Baderko (30 January–14 February 1942)
- Colonel Iosif Lebedinsky (15 February–23 July 1942)
- Colonel Konstantin Vvedensky (5 August 1942–19 May 1944)
- Colonel Aleksandr Ordanovsky (22 May–21 July 1944)
- Colonel Ivan Marchenko (23 July–18 August 1944)
- Colonel Aleksandr Golovanov (8 September–26 November 1944)
- Major General Dmitry Lukyanov (27 November 1944–28 February 1945)
- Colonel Yakov Kozhevnikov (3 March–31 October 1945)

== Cold War ==
After fighting on the Eastern Front, the division's second formation was relocated to Siberia in 1945. In September 1945, the division, part of the 122nd Rifle Corps, arrived in the city of Novosibirsk in the Siberian Military District, and was given barracks in a military townlet on Bogatkova street. In 1946, the division was reorganized as the 24th Rifle Brigade. In 1953, the brigade was upgraded and redesignated as the 85th Pavlovsk Rifle Red Banner Division once again. From 1957 the division became the 85th Motorised Rifle Division. Furthermore, the division exchanged regiments with the 74th Motor Rifle Division – the 103rd Motor Rifle Regiment was disbanded and replaced by the 228th Sevastopol Order of Alexander Nevsky Motor Rifle Regiment.

On 27 March 1967, the division was given the honorary name of Leningrad and it became known as the 85th Motor Rifle Leningrad-Pavlovsk Red Banner Division. Around 1988 the division consisted of the 387th Tank Regiment, 141st, 59th, 228th MRRs, 167th Artillery Regiment, and the 1131st Anti-Aircraft Artillery Regiment. In 1989 the 1131st Anti-Aircraft Artillery Regiment was disbanded, and was replaced by the 927th Anti-Aircraft Rocket Regiment from the Belorussian Military District.

== Service in the Russian Ground Forces ==
In 1992, the 74th Guards Tank Valga Order of Lenin Red Banner, Orders of Suvorov, Kutuzov and Bogdan Khmelnitsky Regiment relocated from Schwerin in Germany and joined the division. The 74th had previously been assigned to the 94th Guards Motor Rifle Division, which, reduced in status to the 74th Guards Motor Rifle Brigade, had been relocated nearby to Yurga.

From December 1994 to 27 April 1995 the division sent personnel to the First Chechen War: 82 officers, 43 corporals, and 373 soldiers and sergeants. The division's troops, part of the Northern Group of Russian Forces, operated with the 74th Brigade. The division's troops cleared Chechen fighters from the administrative and residential buildings in Grozny, defended a strategically important bridge over the Sunzha on the outskirts of the village of Peter, and defended the approaches to the village of Ilinskoe from an invasion of Chechen rebels from Gudermes.

In 2003 Major General Vladimir Ashitok was named as the divisional commander. Previous commanders included Major Generals Vasily Lunev, Anatoly Makushin, and Igor Puzanov (between 1983 and 1986).

From September 2000, the division fought in the Second Chechen War. The 228th Motor Rifle Regiment, the only Russian regiment to be fully equipped with the BMP-3, was reequipped with MT-LB armoured personnel carriers in 2000 because a six-month tour in Chechnya had reduced the service life of the vehicles by half. In other words, maintenance problems were much greater when the vehicles were conscript-crewed.

Around 2007 to 2009 the composition of the division was reported as:

- 59th Motor-Rifle Regiment
- 141st Motor-Rifle Regiment
- 228th Motor-Rifle Regiment
- 74th Guards Valga Order of Lenin, Red Banner, Order of Suvorov, Kutuzov and Bogdan Khmelnitsky Tank Regiment (Shilovo, Novosibirsk Oblast, Т-72B)
- 167th Artillery Regiment (Shilovo)
- 1131st Anti-Aircraft Rocket Regiment
- 121st Separate Reconnaissance Battalion
- 581st Separate Battalion
- 279th Separate Engineer Battalion

The division appears to have been reorganised as the 32nd Separate Motor Rifle Brigade, formed from the 228th Motor Rifle Regiment (possibly at Shilovo) as part of the Russian Ground Forces' reorganisation in early 2009. In 2016, the brigade was used to form the new 228th Motor Rifle Regiment of the 90th Guards Tank Division. The 228th inherited the honors and traditions of the 85th Motor Rifle Division.
