= Neman =

River in Northeast Europe

Neman Nemunas Niemen
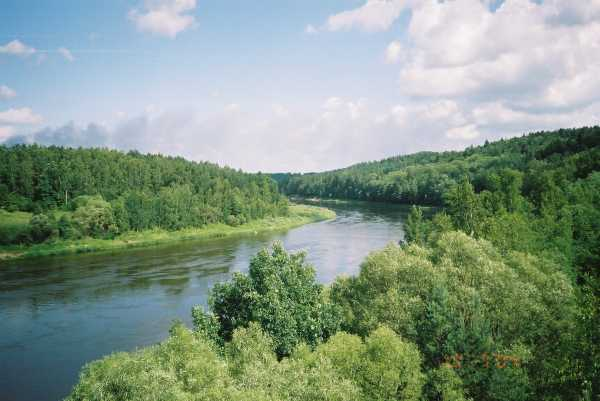
- Neman near Alytus

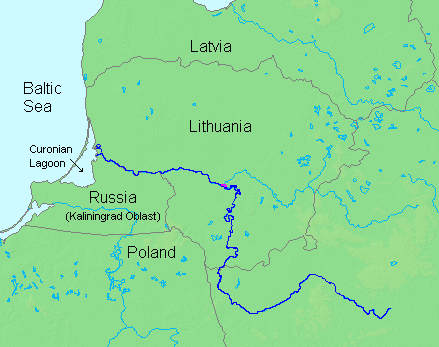
- Map highlighting Neman
- Etymology: possible Slavic word for monster

Location
- Country: Belarus, Lithuania, Russia
- Cities: Stowbtsy, Grodno, Druskininkai, Alytus, Birštonas, Prienai, Kaunas, Jurbarkas, Sovetsk

Physical characteristics
- Source
  - location: Southwest of Minsk, Belarus
  - coordinates: 53°15′10″N 27°18′21″E
  - elevation: 176 m (577 ft)
- Mouth: Curonian Lagoon
  - location: West of Šilutė, Lithuania
  - coordinates: 55°20′12″N 21°14′50″E
  - elevation: 0 m (0 ft)
- Length: 937 km (582 mi)
- Basin size: 98,200 km^{2} (37,900 sq mi)
- Discharge
  - location: Curonian Lagoon, linked to the Baltic Sea
  - average: 678 m^{3}/s (23,900 cu ft/s)

The Neman (based on Russian spelling), Nioman (Belarusian), Nemunas (Lithuanian), Niemen (Polish), or Memel (German), (Note: Lithuanian: Nemunas; Belarusian: Нёман, romanized: Nioman, pronounced [ˈnʲoman]; Russian: Неман, romanized: Neman; German: Memel; Latvian: Nemuna; Estonian: Neemen; Polish: Niemen; Swedish: Njemen; Yiddish: נעמאן, romanized: Neman; Ukrainian: Німан, romanized: Niman) is a river in Europe that rises in central Belarus and flows through Lithuania then forms the northern border of Kaliningrad Oblast, Russia's western exclave, which specifically follows its southern channel. It drains into the Curonian Lagoon, narrowly connected to the Baltic Sea. The 937 km (582 mi) long Neman is a major Eastern European river. It flows generally west to Grodno within 12 kilometres (7.5 mi) of the Polish border, north to Kaunas, then westward again to the sea.

The largest river in Lithuania, and the third-largest in Belarus, it is navigable for most of its length. It starts from two small headwaters merging about 15 kilometers (9 mi) southwest of the town of Uzda – about 55 km (34 mi) southwest of Belarus's capital city Minsk. Only 17 kilometres (11 mi), an eastward meander, contributes to the Belarus–Lithuania border. Thereafter the river includes notable loops along a minor tectonic fault.

Its drainage basin settled in the late Quaternary to be roughly along the edge of the last glacial sheet so dates to about 25,000 to 22,000 years BC. Its depth varies from 1 meter (3 ft 3 in) in its upper courses to 5 meters (16 ft) in the lower basin.

== Numbers ==
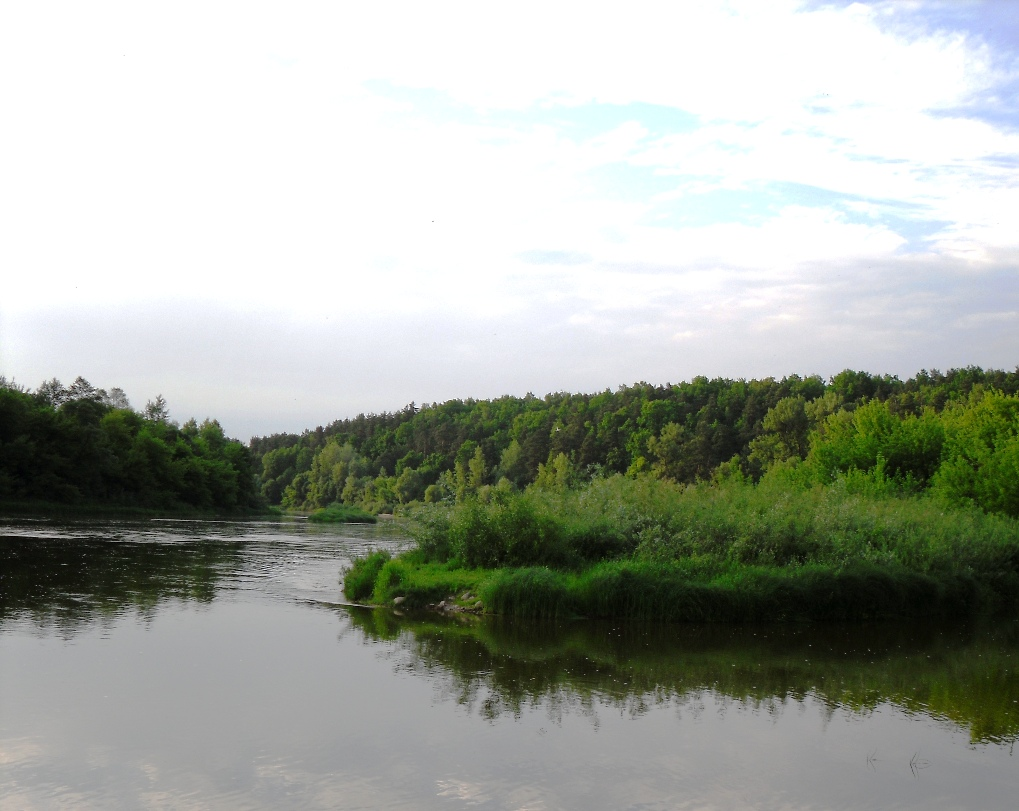
The Neman near Grodno

- The total length of the Nioman/Nemunas/Neman is 937 km (582 mi). It is the fourth longest river in the Baltic Sea basin. Over its entire length, 436 km (271 mi) flows in Belarus and 359 km (223 mi) in Lithuania. A 116 km (72 mi) stretch is the border between Lithuania and Russia's Kaliningrad oblast.
- Its greatest depth is 5 m (16 ft), and at its widest it extends about 500 m (1,600 ft).
- The Nioman/Nemunas/Neman is a slow river; it flows at about 1 to 2 m/s (3.3 to 6.6 ft/s).
- During floods, water discharge can increase up to 11-fold, to more than 6,800 m^{3}/s (240,000 cu ft/s). Severe floods occur on the lower reaches of the river about every 12 – 15 years, which sometimes wash out bridges.

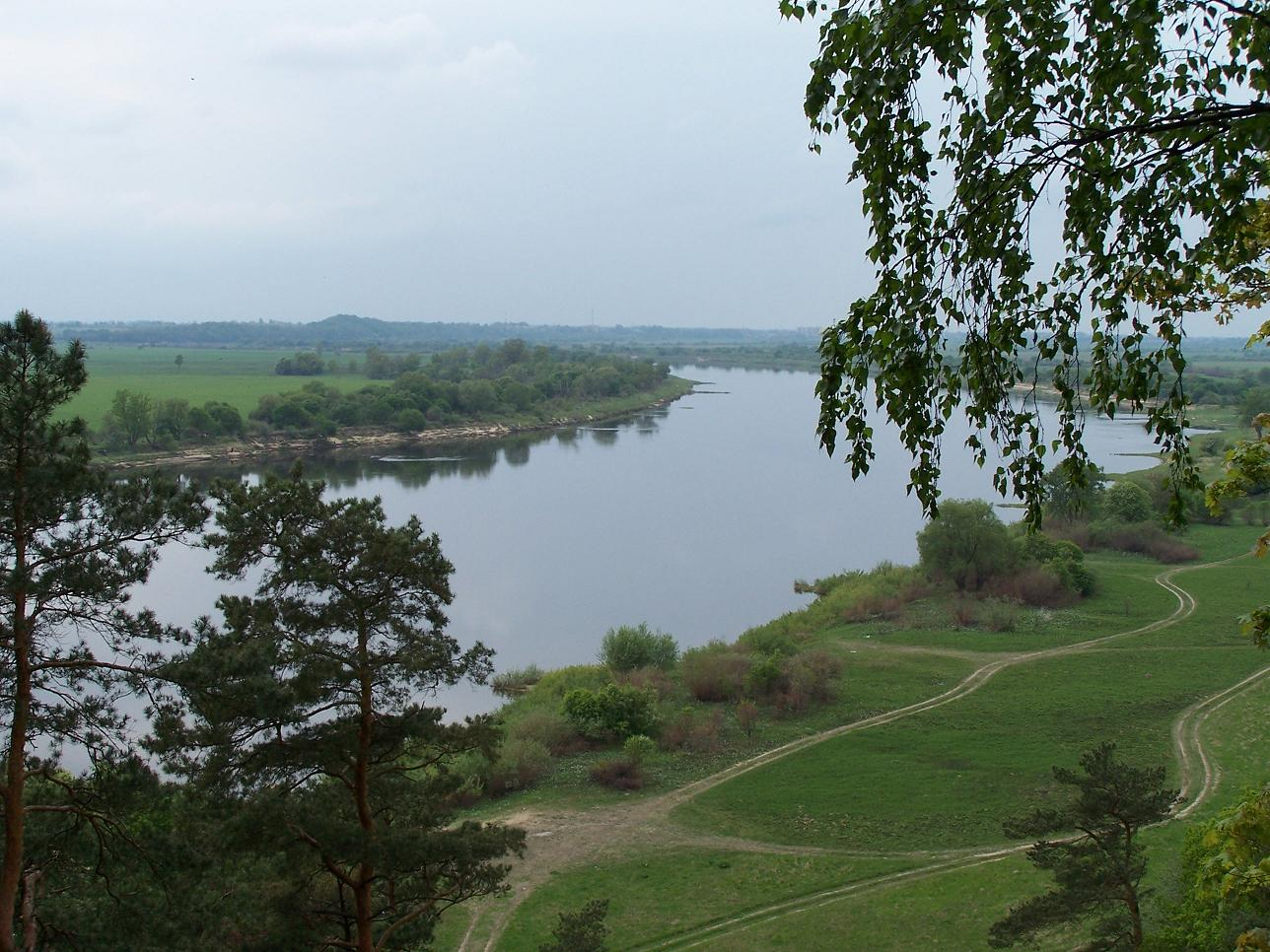
Neman opposite Kaliningrad Oblast (Russian exclave)

- The Nioman/Nemunas/Neman is an old river, dating back to the last glacial period. Its valley is now up to 60 meters (200 ft) deep and 5 km (3 mi) broad.
- It has about 105 first-class tributaries, the largest being the rivers Neris (Viliya) (510 km (320 mi)), Shchara (325 km (202 mi)), and Šešupė (298 km (185 mi)). Fifteen of the tributaries are longer than 100 km (62 mi).
- In the complete Nioman/Nemunas/Neman basin, there are tributaries extending to the 11th order.
- The Nemunas basin in Lithuania drains more than 20,000 rivers and rivulets and covers 72% of Lithuania's territory.

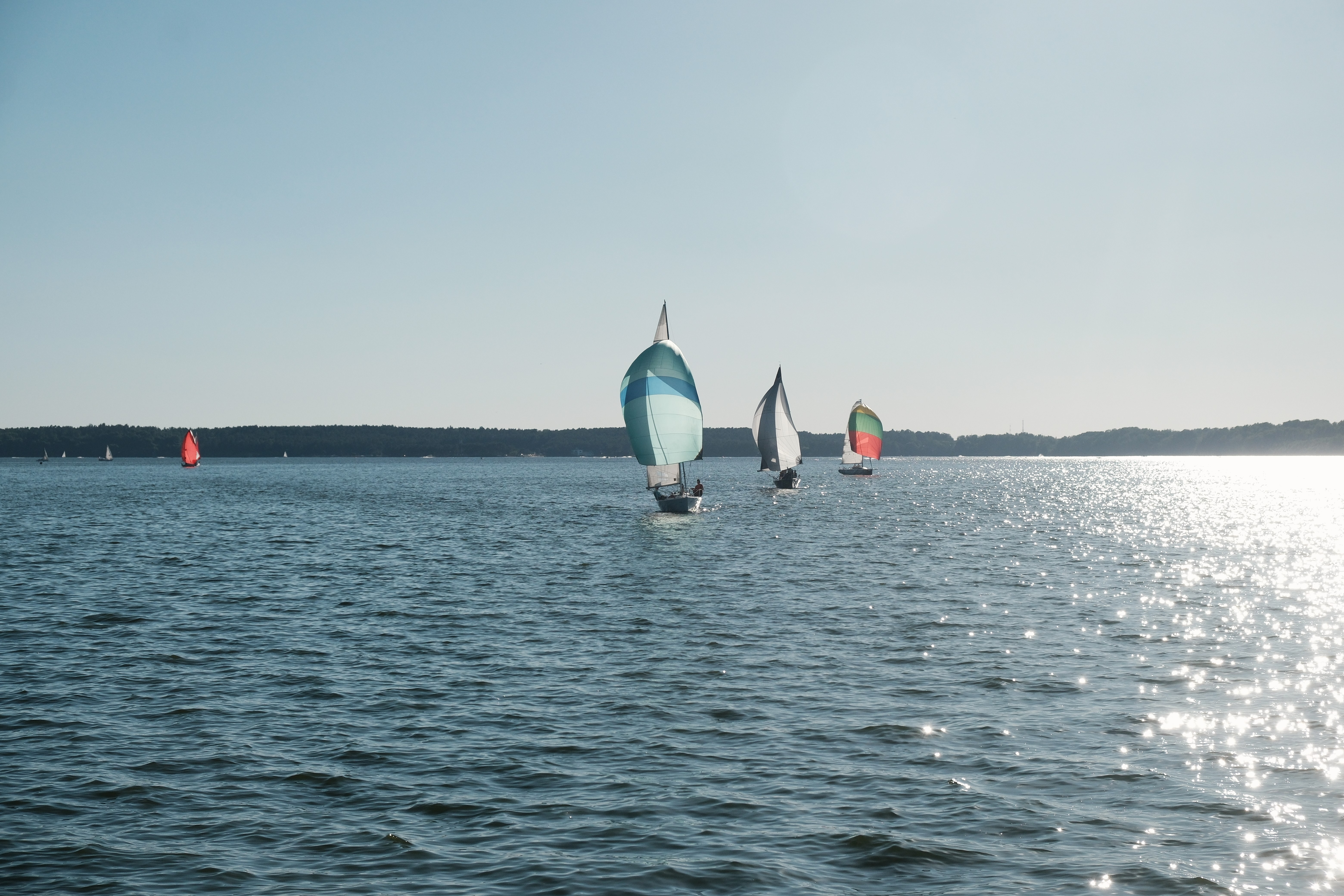
Sailing on the Neman

- The total area of the Nioman/Nemunas/Neman basin is 98,200 km^{2} (37,900 mi^{2}), 34,610 km^{2} (13,360 mi^{2}) of which are within Belarus, the Lithuanian portion of this basin is 46,695 km^{2} (268 sq mi).
- Valley of Neman in Grodno Region is the lowest point above sea level in Belarus at 80 to 90 m (260 to 300 ft).

== River course ==
=== Nemunas loops ===
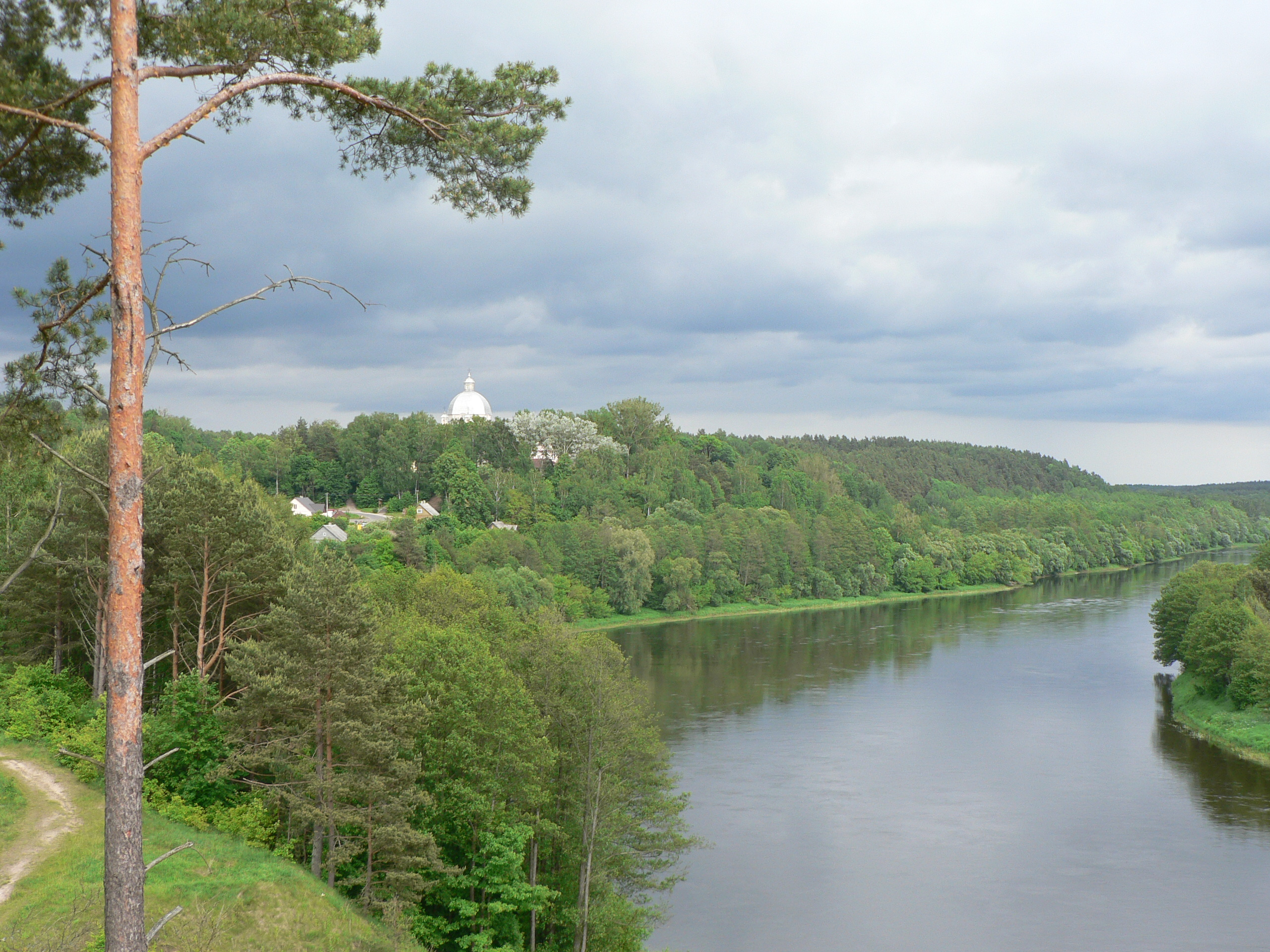
Nemunas bend in Liškiava

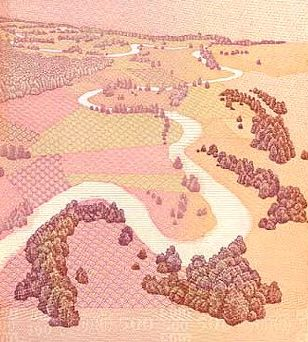
500 litas banknote featuring Nemunas loops

Due to their location, "the Nemunas loops" are often described using the Lithuanian name for the river. In 1992 Nemunas Loops Regional Park was founded. Its goal is to preserve the loops (Lithuanian: vingis) that the river makes in the Punia forest. Near Prienai, the river makes a 17-kilometer-long (11 mi) loop (like a teardrop) coming within 1.2 km (3/4 mi) of completing the loop. Nemunas flows along the double bend between Balbieriškis and Birštonas for 48 km (30 mi) and then moves in a northerly direction for only 4.5 km (2 3/4 mi). The loops are not conventional river meanders; they follow underlying tectonic structures. The faults are the source of local mineral springs. The area is historically and culturally significant. Its castles served as the first line of defense against forays by the Teutonic knights.

=== Delta ===
At its delta Nemunas splits into a maze of river branches and canals mixing with polders and wetlands and is a very attractive destination for eco-tourism. The four main distributaries are Atmata, Pakalnė, Skirvytė (the southern mouth, marking the international border) and Gilija. The river plays a crucial part in the ecosystem of the Curonian Lagoon. It provides the main water inflow to the lagoon and keeps the water almost fresh. This allows fresh water and brackish water animals to survive there. As the delta extends north the lagoon opposite narrows. Since the delta is in Lithuania, it is often referred to as Nemunas Delta. Nemunas Delta Regional Park was created in the delta in 1992.

=== Tributaries ===
The following rivers are tributaries to the river Neman/Nemunas (from source to mouth):

- Left: Servach, Mowchadz’, Shchara, Zelvyanka, Svislach, Lasosna, Czarna Hańcza, Zembrė, Peršėkė, Šešupė, Tylzha
- Right: Western Berezina, Gauja, Kotra, Haradnichanka, Merkys, Verknė, Strėva, Neris, Nevėžis, Dubysa, Mituva, Jūra, Minija

=== Largest settlements on the river ===
From west to east, the largest settlements are Sovetsk/Tilsit, Neman, Kaunas, Alytus, Druskininkai, Grodno, and Masty.

== Significance in culture ==
Ptolemy referred to Neman as Chronos (although competing theories suppose Chronos was in fact Pregolya).

The river has lent its name to the Neman Culture, a Neolithic archaeological subculture.

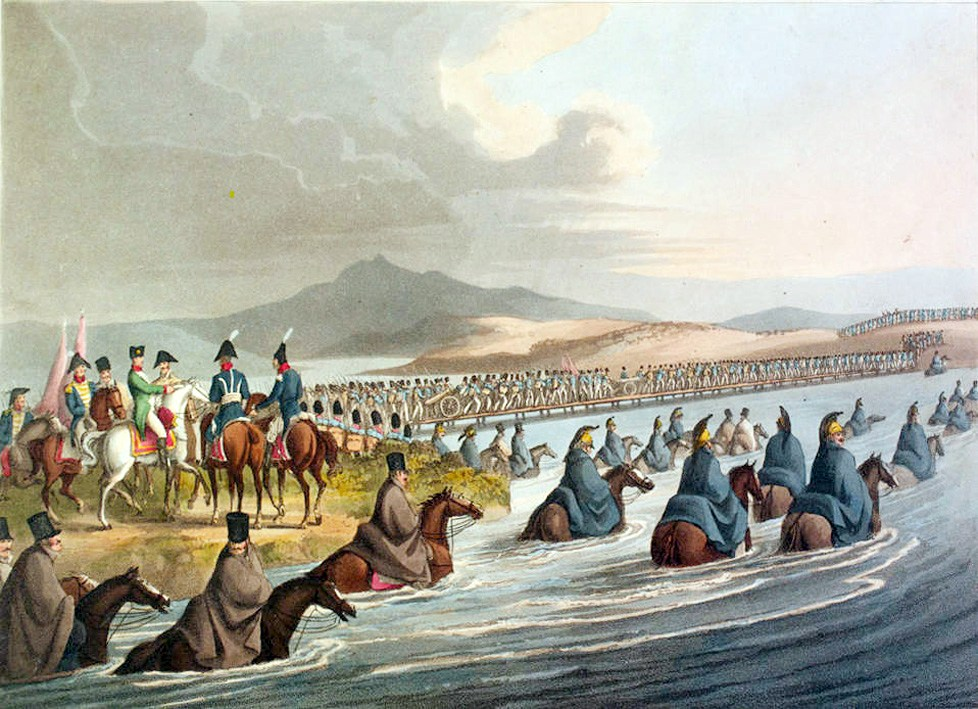
Napoleon and his army crossing the Neman in June 1812, by John Heaviside Clark

In German, the part of the river flowing through historic Prussia has been called die Memel at least since about 1250, when Teutonic Knights built Memelburg castle and the town of Memel at the mouth of the Curonian Lagoon, naming it after the indigenous name of the river, Memel. The city of Memel, now in Lithuania, is known today as Klaipėda (confusingly, another city of Memel was on the Dange River, now called the Danė). In German road maps and lexika, only the 112-kilometer (70 mi) section within Prussia (starting at Schmalleningken) was named Memel; the bulk of the river was Niemen.

The border between the State of the Teutonic Order and Lithuania was fixed in 1422 by the Treaty of Lake Melno and remained stable for centuries. The Treaty of Tilsit between Napoleon and Tsar Alexander I was signed on a raft in the river in 1807. Napoleon's crossing at the outset of the 1812 French invasion of Russia is described in War and Peace and also mentioned in Pan Tadeusz. In 1919, the Treaty of Versailles made the river the border separating the Memel Territory from German East Prussia as of 1920. At that time, Germany's Weimar Republic adopted the Deutschlandlied as its official national anthem. In the first stanza of the song, written in 1841, the river is mentioned as the eastern border of a (then politically yet-to-be united) Germany:

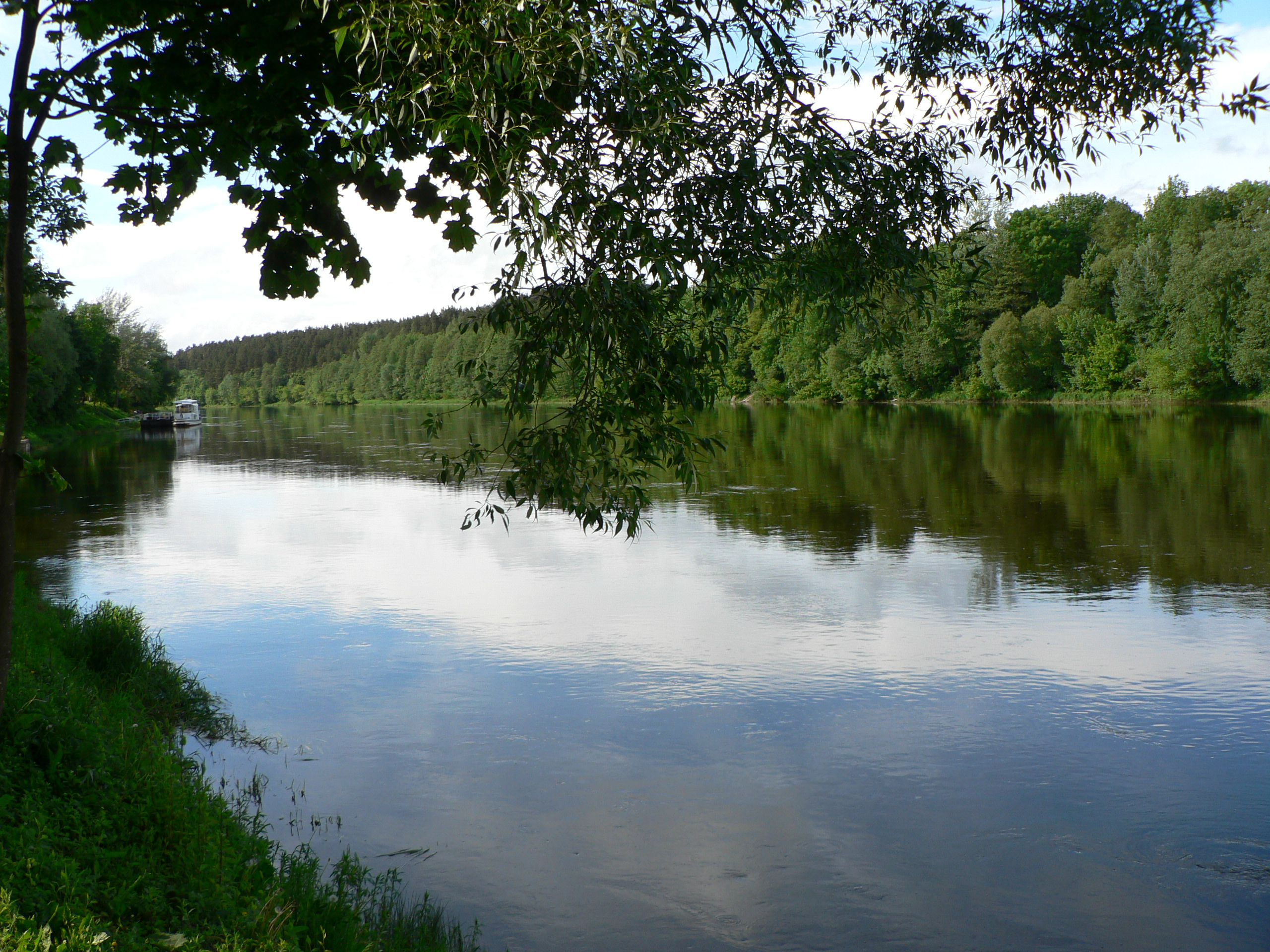
The Nemunas in Druskininkai

German lyrics	Approximate English translation
Von der Maas bis an die Memel, Von der Etsch bis an den Belt	From the Meuse to the Memel, From the Adige to the Belt

Lithuanians refer to Nemunas as "the father of rivers" (Nemunas is a masculine noun in Lithuanian). Countless companies and organizations in Lithuania have "Nemunas" in their name, including a folklore ensemble, a weekly magazine about art and culture, a sanatorium, and numerous guest houses and hotels. Lithuanian and Polish literature often mention the Nemunas. One of the most famous poems by Maironis starts:

Lithuanian lyrics	Approximate English translation
Kur bėga Šešupė, kur Nemunas teka	Where the Šešupė runs, where the Nemunas flows
Tai mūsų tėvynė, graži Lietuva	That's our homeland, beautiful Lithuania

Smaller rivers and rivulets in Lithuania with names morphologically derived or cognate are the Nemunykštis, Nemuniukas, Nemunynas, Nemunėlis and Nemunaitis.

The etymology is disputed: some say that "Nemunas" is an old word meaning "a damp place", while others that it is "mute, soundless river" (from nemti, nėmti "to become silent", also memelis, mimelis, mėmė "slow, worthless person"). The name is possibly derived from the Finnic word niemi "cape".

In 1872 the Ukrainian composer Volodymyr Aleksandrov composed the operetta "Za Neman idu" (Beyond the Neman I go), based on the 1820 poem by Stepan Pysarevsyki.

Art critics praised its depiction in the paintings by Michał Kulesza.

== Economic significance ==
Schematic map of Kaunas Reservoir area

Much of the river is used for fishing, hydropower generation, water supply, industry, agriculture, recreation, tourism, and water transport.

Lithuania has tabled local plans to dredge it, below Kaunas, to make it more consistently usable.

The largest cities on the river are Grodno in Belarus, Alytus and Kaunas in Lithuania, and Sovetsk in the Kaliningrad Oblast of Russia. The river basin has a population of 5.4 million inhabitants. Industrial activities in the Belarusian section include metal processing, chemical industries, pulp and paper production, and manufacturing of building materials, as well as food-processing plants. In Lithuania, the city of Kaunas, with about 400,000 inhabitants, is the country's principal user of the river; the local industries that impact the river are hydropower generation, machinery, chemical, wood processing and paper production, furniture production, textile and food-processing. In Kaliningrad, industrial centers near the river include Sovetsk and Neman, which have large pulp and paper production facilities.

Above Kaunas a dam was built in 1959 to serve the Kaunas Hydroelectric Power Plant. The resulting Kaunas Reservoir (Lithuanian: Kauno marios) is the largest such lake in Lithuania. It occupies 63.5 km^{2} (24 1/2 sq mi); its length is 93 km (58 mi); its greatest depth is 22 m (72 ft). The reservoir is a popular destination for Lithuanian yachting.

The Augustów Canal, built in the 19th century, connects Neman to Vistula river.

== Biological communities ==
Fish found include the: perch, pike, zander, roach, tench, bream, rudd, ruffe, and bleak.

Its tributaries have borne stone loach, three-spined stickleback, minnows, trout, sculpins, gudgeon, dace and chub.

Atlantic salmon migrated upstream to spawn; however, dams on the river, most of them built in the 20th century, have depleted them. The dam at Kaunas does not provide fish ladders. The spawning season took place in the fall. Ethnographic studies, from before the dams, state night fishing, using torches and harpoons, was a common technique.

== Environmental issues ==
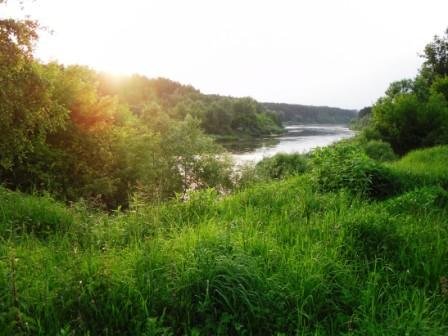
Neman sunset

A report by the Swedish EPA (Environmental Protection Administration) rates the river's quality in Lithuania as moderately polluted to polluted. High concentrations of organic pollutants, nitrates and phosphates occur in parts of the river. Environmental issues include water quality (eutrophication and pollutants largely due to outdated technology sewage treatment works), changes in the hydrological regime, and flooding control. The environmental problems in each of the countries that make up the basin are slightly different. In Belarus, the main problems are oil products as well as nitrogen and BOD (biological oxygen demand). The environmental issues in the Kaliningrad section include high concentrations of BOD, lignosulphates, and nitrogen. In Lithuania, the Kaunas Hydroelectric Power Plant barrage affects the riparian ecosystem.

Co-operation which would be beneficial is complicated by the geographical split between three nations but water quality improvement initiatives are underway.

== See also ==
- List of rivers of Europe
- Normandie-Niemen (a fighter squadron, later regiment (of three squadrons) of the French Air Force)
- Memelland
- East Prussia
