= Aleksandr Kozhevnikov =

Aleksandr Kozhevnikov may refer to:

- Alexandre Kojève (1902–1968), Russian-born French intellectual, born Kozhevnikov
- Alexander Kozhevnikov (ice hockey) (born 1958), Soviet Russian ice hockey player
- Aleksandr Kozhevnikov (footballer) (born 1990), Russian football player
- Oleksandr Kozhevnikov (born 2000), Ukrainian football player
