= Lasosna =

Lasosna Łosośna
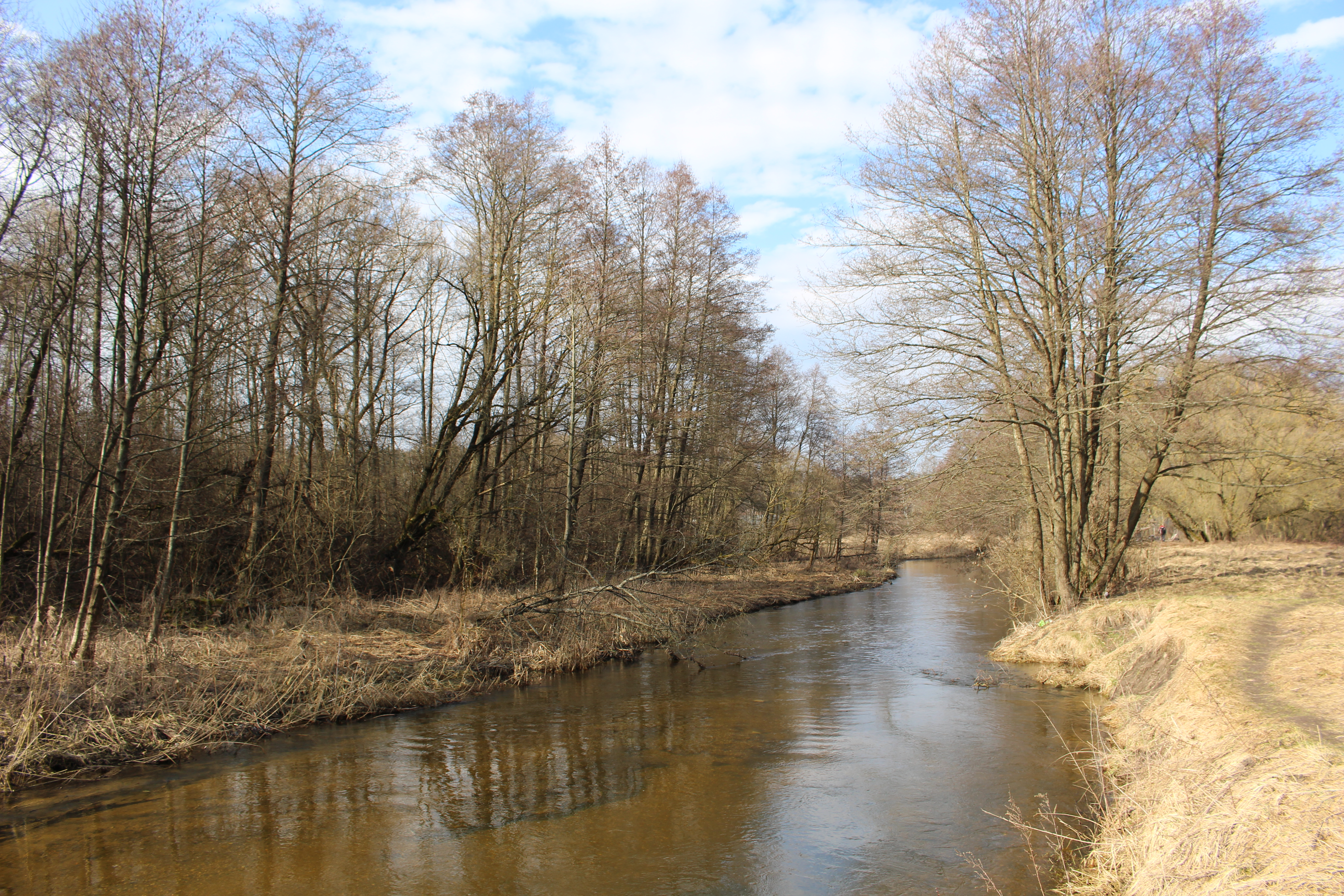

Location
- Country: Poland, Belarus

Physical characteristics
- Mouth
  - location: Neman
  - coordinates: 53.6777°N 23.7781°E

Basin features
- Progression: Neman→ Baltic Sea

The Lasosna, Lasasyanka (Belarusian: Ласосна, Ласасянка), Polish: Łosośna is a river in Poland (Sokółka County) and Belarus (Hrodna and Hrodna district). Of the river's 46 km length, 24 km is in Poland and the rest in Belarus. It is a left-bank tributary of the Neman.
