= 24th Rifle Corps =

Soviet Red Army formation

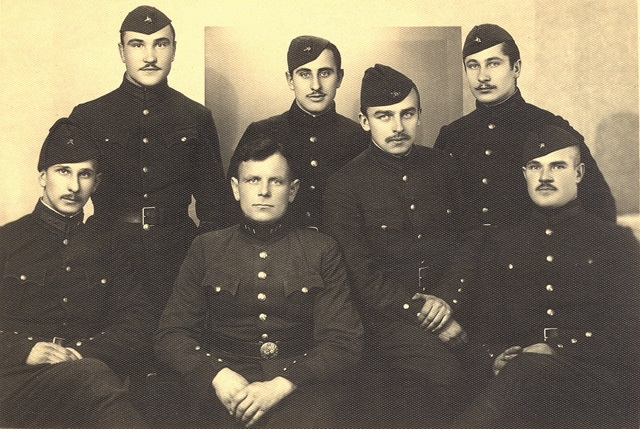
- Soldiers of the corps, wearing Latvian Army uniforms with Soviet insignia
- Active: 1939–1941; 1943–1946
- Allegiance: Soviet Union
- Branch: Soviet Red Army
- Engagements: World War II; Eastern Front; Operation Barbarossa

The 24th Rifle Corps was a corps of the Red Army. It was part of the 27th Army and took part in the Great Patriotic War. It appears to have been initially formed in the Kalinin Military District, around what is today Tver, in 1939 during the Soviet invasion of Poland. In 1940 it was relocated to Soviet-occupied Latvia with units of the dissolved Latvian Army added to the corps.

== 24th Territorial Rifle Corps ==
After the Soviet occupation of Latvia in June 1940, the annihilation of the Latvian Army began. The army was first renamed the People's Army of Latvia (Latvian: Latvijas Tautas armija) and in September–November 1940 the Red Army's 24th Territorial (Rifle) Corps (Latvian: 24. teritoriālais korpuss, Russian: 24-й территориальный корпус РККА). An alternate name was the 24th Latvian Riflemen Corps (24. latviešu strēlnieku korpuss, 24-й Латышский стрелковый корпус). The corps comprised the 181st and 183rd Rifle Divisions. In most cases, soldiers and officers of the corps continued to wear former Latvian Army uniforms with removed Latvian insignia and/or with added Soviet rank insignia.

In September the corps contained 24,416 men but in autumn more than 800 officers and about 10,000 instructors and soldiers were discharged. The arrests of soldiers continued in the following months. In June 1940, the entire Territorial Corps was sent to Litene camp. Before leaving the camp, Latvians drafted in 1939 were demobilised, and replaced by about 4,000 Russian soldiers from the area around Moscow. On June 10, the corps' senior officers were sent to supposed 'officer courses' in Moscow, where they were arrested and most of them were shot. On June 14, the camp was surrounded by NKVD Troops – around ten soldiers were shot, and at least 430 officers were arrested and sent to Gulag camps in Norilsk.

After the German attack against the Soviet Union, from June 29 to July 1 more than 2080 Latvian soldiers were demobilised, fearing that they might turn their weapons against the Russian commissars and officers. Simultaneously, many soldiers and officers deserted and when the corps crossed the Latvian border into the Russian SFSR, only about 3,000 Latvian soldiers remained.

After completing a fighting retreat to Staraya Russa and beyond, the corps was dissolved on September 1, 1941.

== 2nd formation ==
The Corps was recreated on February 24, 1943. It fought in the Central Front as part of the 60th Army, and later in the 1st Ukrainian Front as part of the 13th Army from March 14, 1943, to May 11, 1945. The corps was disbanded in July 1946.

== Formations ==
=== 1940-1941 ===
- Corps HQ
- 181st Rifle Division, formed from the Latvian Army's 1st Kurzeme Infantry Division and the 2nd Vidzeme Infantry Division
- 183rd Rifle Division, formed from the 3rd Latgale Infantry Division and the 4th Zemgale Infantry Division
- 613th Corps Artillery Regiment
- 111th Separate Anit-air Battalion
- 511st Separate Communications Battalion
- 305th Separate Sapper Battalion
- 24th Corps Aviation Squad
- 20th Cavalry Regiment, formed from the 1st Cavalry Regiment (disbanded in December 1940 as being 'obsolete')

== Commanders ==
- Lieutenant General Roberts Kļaviņš (December 1940 - Jun 1941) - arrested and executed
- Major General Kuzma Kachanov (30.06.1941 - 01.09.1941)
- Major General Nikolay Kiryukhin (24.02.1943 - 17.08.1944)
- Major General Dmitry Onuprienko (18.08.1944 - 11.05.1945)
