= Kirill Kozhevnikov =

Kirill Kozhevnikov may refer to:

- Kirill Kozhevnikov (sailor) (born 1926), sailor at the 1952 Olympics
- Kirill Kozhevnikov (ice hockey) (born 1999), Russian ice hockey player
