= Sonino =

Sonino may refer to:

- Sonino, Tula Oblast, a village in Tula Oblast, Russia
- Sonino, Yaroslavl Oblast, a village in Yaroslavl Oblast, Russia
- Sonino, name of several other rural localities in Russia
