= Adamenka =

River in Bykhaw District, Belarus

Coordinates: 53°20′07″N 30°21′32″E

Adamenka (Belarusian: Адаменка) is a small river in the Bykhaw District, Mogilev Oblast, Belarus, a right tributary of the Dnieper River. The length of the river is 13 kilometers. The river has its source northeast of the village of Charnalesse (Чарналессе) and flows into Dnieper by the agrotown Novy Bykhaw.
