= Ekaterina Kozhevnikova =

Russian classical music composer (born 1954)

Ekaterina Kozhevnikova (Russian: Екатерина Кожевникова) is a Russian classical music composer. She was born in Moscow on August 2, 1954. At the Moscow Conservatory, she studied composition with Dmitry Kabalevsky and Tikhon Khrennikov and piano with L. N. Naumov, graduating in 1977. In that year she was awarded the 1st Prize for Symphony at the All-Union Competition for Young Composers.

In 1979, Kozhevnikova became a member of the Union of Composers of the USSR. Since 2001, she has been a member of the selection and organizing committees of the Moscow Autumn contemporary music festival, where many of her orchestral and chamber works received their premieres. From 2002 to the present, Kozhevnikova has been a member of the Board of the Union of Moscow Composers.

Her works in various genres are often unconventional in structure and instrumentation. She has cited Olivier Messiaen and Krzystof Penderecki as influences.

== Symphonies and works for large symphony orchestra ==
- Symphony No. 1 (1977)
- Symphony No. 2, "Sinfonia da Requiem." Dedicated to the memory of Kozhevnikova's mother (1979)
- Symphony No. 3 (2003. Second edition 2018)
- Chant (1988)
- Plea (1991)
- Vision. Dedicated to Konstantin Krimets (2004)
- Cain and Abel (2006)
- Judith symphonic picture. Dedicated to Konstantin Krimets (2008)
- Summer Pastoral for brass band (2015)
- Concerto for piano and symphony orchestra. Dedicated to Eleonora Teplukhina (2017)

== Works for string orchestra ==
- Retrospection (1996)
- Farewell for flute, harpsichord and string orchestra. Dedicated to the memory of Armen Shahbagyan (1999)
- Little Easter Liturgy. Dedicated to Vladislav Bulakhov (2009)
- A blue planet flying into Infinity (2005)

== Ballet ==
- Judith One-act ballet. Dedicated to Konstantin Krimets (2008)

== Oratorios and cantatas ==
- Mullanur oratorio on poems by R. Harris for tenor, soprano, chorus and large symphony orchestra (1984)
- Cossack Word cantata for bass, mezzo soprano, chorus and large symphony orchestra on Russian folk text (1985)
- Eros oratorio for bass, mezzo soprano, chorus, organ and large symphony orchestra on the poems of ancient poets: Pallas, Ivik, Anacreon, Alcmana, Flacca, Alkey, Sappho, Tuccian (1990)
- Even and Odd cantata on the verses of the Silver Age poets V. Bryusov, V. Khodasevich, K. Balmont for choir, organ and chamber orchestra (2002)
- Lazor cantata for folk voice and chamber orchestra on verses by M. Tsvetaeva from the poem "Lane". Dedicated to Inna Romashchuk (2005)
- Winter Morning on verses by Aleksandr Pushkin for mixed choir, bells, vibraphone, harp and cello (2007)
- Dream of the Virgin apocryphal song on the text of spiritual verses for two voices, string orchestra and percussion. Dedicated to Sergei Zhukov (2009)

== Works for choir a cappella ==
- Bowing to the ground for mixed choir and solo female folk voice on the verses of M. Tsvetaeva (1987)
- Prayer of the Last Optina Elders at the Beginning of the Day for mixed choir (2009)

== Chamber instrumental and vocal music ==
- Vocal cycle on verses by Omar Khayyam for baritone and chamber ensemble (1975)
- Music for Two for cello and piano (1976)
- String Quartet No. 2, Three Pieces in the Past Tense (1977)
- Triptych on verses by A. Fet for tenor, organ and chamber ensemble (1978)
- Three portraits of women on the verses of V. Brusov for soprano and piano (1979)
- Largo for harp, two violins, viola and cello. (1983)
- String Quartet No. 3 (1985)
- Three Wedding Songs to a Russian folk text for a folk voice (1985)
- Postlude for two mandolins, mandolas, guitar and piano. Dedicated to V. Kruglov (1993)
- Bell-Ringer triptych for piano. Dedicated to Larisa Shilovskaya (1994)
- Ascent to the Light two chapters from the ancient Egyptian Book of the Dead for mezzo soprano, two violins, viola, cello, harp, piano and saxophone (1997)
- Mirage for percussion instruments and harp. (1998)
- Rural Landscape with a Bell Tower woodwind sextet (2001)
- ... if we are together vocal cycle on verses by A. Akhmatova and N. Gumilev for soprano, bass, two violins, viola, cello and piano (2013)
- Once again about birds trio for flute, cello and piano (2019)
