= Yakov Kozhevnikov =

Soviet Army major general

Yakov Ivanovich Kozhevnikov
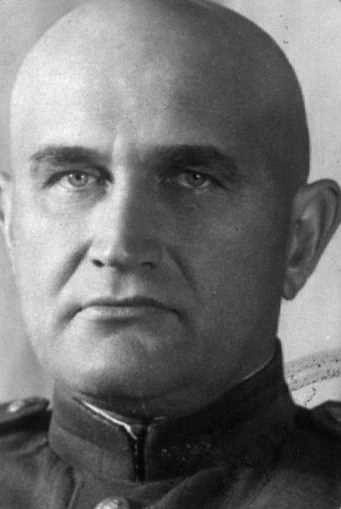
- Born: 3 November 1903; Tanino, Roslavlsky Uyezd, Smolensk Governorate, Russian Empire
- Died: 28 September 1983 (aged 79) Kiev, Soviet Union
- Allegiance: Soviet Union
- Branch: Red Army
- Service years: 1924–1954
- Rank: Major general
- Commands: 201st Rifle Division; 48th Rifle Division; 85th Rifle Division; 16th Separate Guards Rifle Brigade
- Conflicts: World War II
- Awards: Order of Lenin

Yakov Ivanovich Kozhevnikov (Russian: Яков Иванович Кожевников; 3 November 1903 – 28 September 1983) was a Soviet Army major general who held division command during World War II.

A veteran of the Winter War, Kozhevnikov commanded a regiment during the Siege of Leningrad. He commanded three different rifle divisions in the Baltic during 1944 and 1945. Postwar, Kozhevnikov ended his career in the early 1950s as a brigade commander.

== Early life and prewar service ==
Yakov Ivanovich Kozhevnikov was born on 3 November 1903 in the village of Tanino, Yershichsky Volost, Roslavlsky Uyezd in Smolensk Governorate. His social origin was listed in his service record as working class. Kozhevnikov chose a career in the Red Army and was admitted to the Western Infantry School in Smolensk on 1 October 1924. After the disbandment of the school, he was transferred to the Ivanovo-Voznesensk Infantry School at Oryol in October 1926. On graduation from the latter in August 1927, Kozhevnikov was posted to the Moscow Proletarian Rifle Division as commander of a machine gun platoon of its 2nd Rifle Regiment in Moscow. He became a member of the Communist Party in 1929. In October 1931 he rose to command a machine gun company of the 149th Rifle Regiment of the 50th Rifle Division at Kimry, and from March 1933 commanded the divisional separate anti-aircraft machine gun company. In October 1934 he was transferred to the 145th Rifle Regiment of the 49th Rifle Division at Kostroma, where he served as an assistant battalion commander and assistant regimental chief of staff for mobilization.

In March 1939 Kozhevnikov was appointed chief of staff of the 274th Rifle Regiment of the 24th Rifle Division of the Leningrad Military District at Pesochnaya. From January 1940 he served as assistant commander of the regiment. With the division, he fought in the Winter War on the Karelian Isthmus, in the breakthrough of the Mannerheim Line and the drive on Vyborg. For his performance, Kozhevnikov was awarded the Order of the Red Star in April 1940. After the end of the war he served as deputy commander of the 270th Rifle Regiment of the 8th Separate Rifle Brigade, the garrison of the Hanko Naval Base, annexed from Finland. On 10 May 1941 he was appointed chief of the 1st section of the headquarters of the Hanko Peninsula Fortified Region.

== World War II ==
After Operation Barbarossa began, Kozhevnikov continued serving in his previous position, as the Hanko garrison came under siege from Finnish troops. In August he took command of the 219th Rifle Regiment of the 8th Separate Rifle Brigade, which he formed from engineer construction battalions stationed at the base. The brigade defended the Hanko Peninsula until December, then was evacuated by sea to Leningrad. For his performance in the defense of Hanko, Kozhevnikov was recommended by brigade commander Major General Nikolai Simoniak for the Order of the Red Banner, which Kozhevnikov was awarded on 20 December:

Being commander of a rifle regiment newly organized from construction battalions, he managed to train the regiment to carry out combat duties during wartime conditions. Under relentless enemy shelling, he personally supervised the construction of defensive regions and fearlessly inspired soldiers and commanders to finish the work with speed and quality. Holding the forward defensive sector for two months he repeatedly repulsed all sorties of the enemy, wiping out his personnel and materiel. During the evacuation of units from the Hanko peninsula he showed exemplary steadfastness and courage, remaining with the covering force until the last man departed.

After arriving, the 8th Separate Rifle Brigade was placed in the reserve of the Leningrad Front. The brigade was reorganized as the 136th Rifle Division in March 1942, and then-Lieutenant Colonel Kozhevnikov appointed commander of its 342nd Rifle Regiment. He led the regiment in the Sinyavino offensive of August and September, in which the division fought to capture and expand a bridgehead on the eastern bank of the Tosna. Kozhevnikov was lightly wounded during this operation on 22 August. During January 1943, the 136th took part in Operation Iskra. In six days, between 12 and 18 January, its elements, advancing on the main attack axis of the army, broke the German defenses and on 18 January linked up with elements of the 18th Rifle Division of the 2nd Shock Army in the area of Workers Settlement No. 5 to break the Siege of Leningrad. In recognition of their performance in the offensive, the division became the elite 63rd Guards Rifle Division on 19 January, and the regiment the 192nd Guards Rifle Regiment. For his performance in this operation, then-Colonel Kozhevnikov was recommended by Simoniak for a second Order of the Red Banner, but this was downgraded to the Order of Suvorov, 3rd class, which he received on 30 January:

Commanding a rifle regiment, he organized the breakthrough of the enemy defenses, carrying out the tasks assigned to the regiment, capturing a large number of trophies and wiping out up to 1,000 Germans. He directly supervised the battle down to the lowest units. He showed himself to be a fearless commander in battle, able to carry out any task. For bravery and skillful organization in the destruction of the enemy he is deserving of the state award of the Order of the Red Banner.

The 63rd Guards Rifle Division was rebuilt from 21 January, and on 3 February assigned to the 55th Army to take part in the Krasny Bor operation, in which it captured Krasny Bor. From March to July the division defended the line of Vesely poselok, Farforovaya, Aleksandrovskoye, Porokhovoye, Bolshaya and Malaya Okhta, then fought in the Mga offensive. From 15 September, as part of the 67th Army, the division fought in the attacks in the Sinyavino region. Kozhevnikov was lightly wounded again on 18 September. On 22 September, the division handed over its lines and was concentrated 50 kilometers east of Leningrad. As part of the 42nd Army, the division took part in the Krasnoye Selo–Ropsha offensive, in which the siege of Leningrad was completely lifted. On 11 February the division transferred to the 2nd Shock Army and until the end of the month took part in intense fighting in forest and swamp terrain in the Narva offensive.

Kozhevnikov assumed the position of deputy commander of the 63rd Guards Rifle Division on 4 March. He was transferred to command the 201st Rifle Division in the second echelon of the 117th Rifle Corps on 22 April. The division was placed in the reserve of the 8th Army on 16 May and took position at the mouth of the Mustaegi river on the banks of the Narva. Kozhevnikov supervised the rebuilding of the division and successfully organized combat training, for which he was commended by the army military council. When previous division commander Major General Vyacheslav Yakutovich returned from the hospital on 12 June, Kozhevnikov was transferred to command the 48th Rifle Division, defending a fortified line before Sookyulya. The division was assigned to the 8th Army on 16 June and from 24 June fruitlessly attacked towards Sookyulya. At the end of the month the 48th was withdrawn to the front reserve. Relocated to the region of Putki on 7 August, it fought in offensive actions there. During the same month the division was relocated from Estonia to Latvia and as part of the 42nd Army of the 2nd Baltic Front took part in the Riga offensive, in which it advanced on Riga and Dobele. Breaking through the German defenses, the division reached the region of the lakes north of Auce, where it was assigned to the 130th Rifle Corps of the 22nd Army. For his performance in the Riga offensive, Kozhevnikov was recommend for a second Order of the Red Banner by corps commander Major General Afanasy Gryaznov, which he received months later on 29 June 1945:

Colonel Kozhevnikov, in the battles for the liberation of Soviet Latvia from German-Fascist invaders, demonstrated skill in organizing combined arms cooperation, materiel support and leadership of units in offensive fighting. A daring and brave officer. Scorning the danger to his life, Comrade Kozhevnikov often was with the units during the fighting and directed the fighting from there. The division commanded by Colonel Kozhevnikov carried out the tasks assigned by the command during the offensive. For skillful leadership of offensive battles, and personal courage and bravery during these battles, Colonel Kozhevnikov is deserving of the award of the Order of the Red Banner.

In March 1945 Kozhevnikov was transferred to command the 85th Rifle Division, and led it as part of the 22nd and 42nd Armies during offensive and defensive battles in blockade of the Courland Pocket in the Riga region. For his performance in these final battles he received the Order of Alexander Nevsky on 6 June:

Colonel Kozhevnikov, commanding a division, managed to ensure the fulfillment of all tasks entrusted to his unit during the period on the defensive. Fulfilling the task to strengthen the forward line, Colonel Kozhevnikov strove to strengthen the defense. He organized reconnaissance work well, as a result of which the dispositions of the opposing enemy were known by the moment combat operations began. He ensured high offensive spirit among the personnel of his unit. All of these actions assisted the successful carrying out of combat missions during the operation of 5 to 8 May 1945.

== Postwar ==
After the end of the war, Kozhevnikov continued to command the division, being promoted to major general on 11 July. He was placed at the disposal of the Main Cadre Directorate on 31 October 1945, then sent to the Higher Academic Courses at the Voroshilov Higher Military Academy. Completing the courses, Kozhevnikov was appointed chief of the Infantry Officers' Improvement Courses of the Turkestan Military District in May 1947, which in December were renamed the Combined Officers' Improvement Courses of the district. In April 1950 he became deputy commander of the 1st Guards Rifle Division of the Baltic Military District. From April 1952 he commanded the 16th Separate Guards Rifle Brigade of the East Siberian Military District. In December 1953, when the brigade was reorganized as a mechanized division, Kozhevnikov was relieved of command and placed at the disposal of the Transbaikal Military District commander. He was transferred to the reserve on 17 February 1954, and died in Kiev on 28 September 1983.

== Decorations ==
Kozhevnikov was a recipient of the following decorations:

- Order of Lenin
- Order of the Red Banner (2)
- Order of Kutuzov, 2nd class
- Order of Suvorov, 3rd class
- Order of Alexander Nevsky
- Order of the Patriotic War, 1st class
- Order of the Red Star
- Medals
