= Bykhaw district =

District of Mogilev region, Belarus

Bykhaw district Быхаўскі раён (Belarusian) Быховский район (Russian)
- District
- Flag Coat of arms

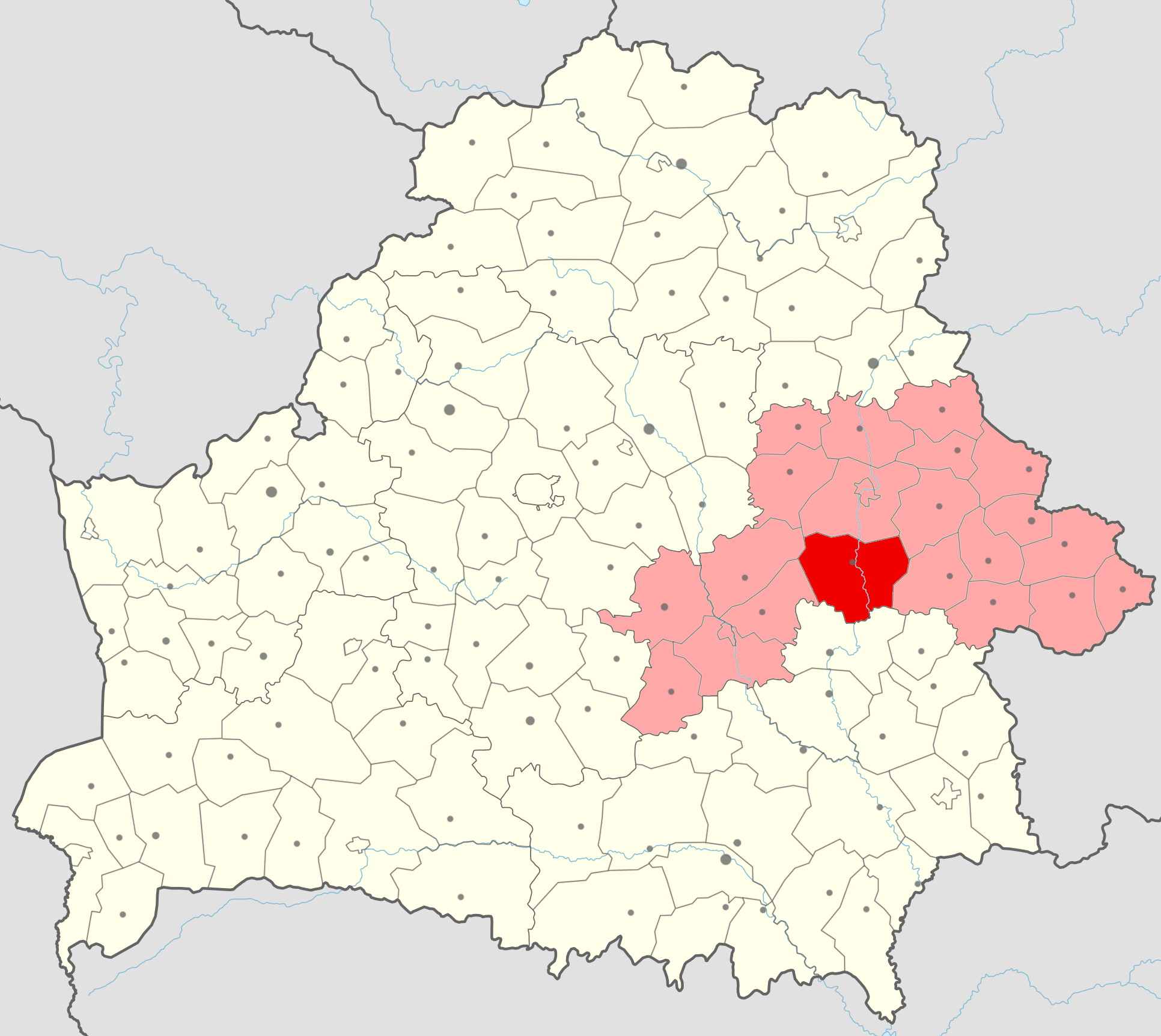
- Coordinates: 53°31′34″N 30°14′09″E
- Country: Belarus
- Region: Mogilev region
- Administrative center: Bykhaw

Area
  - District: 2,263.16 km^{2} (873.81 sq mi)
- Elevation: 151 m (495 ft)

Population (2024)
  - District: 28,172
  - Density: 12.448/km^{2} (32.240/sq mi)
  - Urban: 16,349
  - Rural: 11,823
- Time zone: UTC+3 (MSK)

Bykhaw district or Bychaŭ district (Belarusian: Быхаўскі раён; Russian: Быховский район, romanized: Bykhovsky rayon) is a district (raion) of Mogilev region in Belarus. Its administrative center is the town of Bykhaw. As of 2009, its population was 35,148; the population accounted for 48.5% of the district's population. As of 2024, it has a population of 28,272.

Nearly all Bykhaw district is in the "residential zone with periodic radiation monitoring" - an area with soil contamination due to Chernobyl disaster.
