= March battalion =

Military unit

A march battalion (French: Bataillon de Marche, German: Marschbatallion, Italian: Battaglione di marcia or Polish: Batalion marszowy) is a military unit comprising replacement and support personnel. As the name suggests, they were only formed for the time of the march, i.e. the transfer from the deployment rooms to the troops.

== History ==
In the French Army, in which they originated, Bataillons de Marche derived their name from the fact that they were initially temporary units that followed the main body of a parent infantry regiment, on foot, in a rapid march.

During World War two, several Bataillons de Marche have been created to support the French Liberation Army.

== See also ==
- Marching regiment
