= Bykhaw =

Town in Mogilev Region, Belarus

Bykhaw Быхаў (Belarusian) Быхов (Russian) Bykhov
- Town
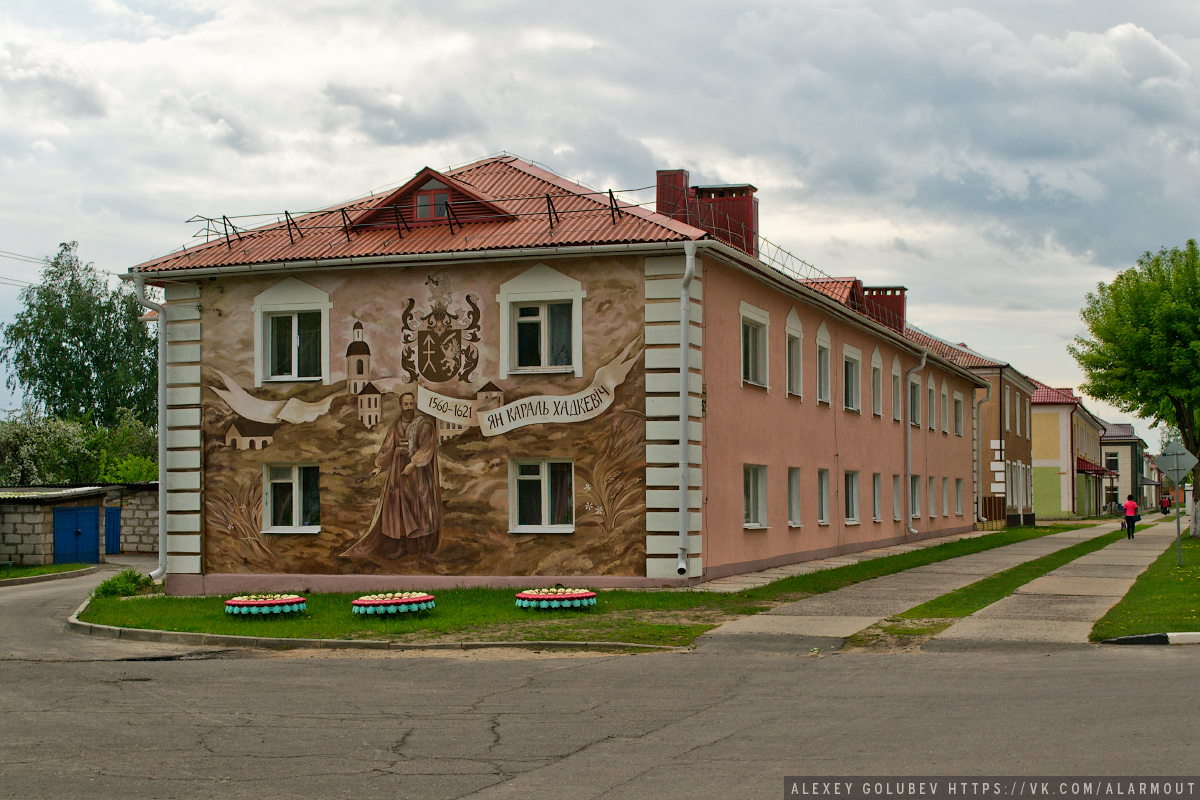

- Flag Coat of arms

- Location within Belarus
- Coordinates: 53°31′N 30°15′E
- Country: Belarus
- Region: Mogilev Region
- District: Bykhaw District
- First mentioned: 14th century

Population (2025)
  - Total: 16,296
- Time zone: UTC+3 (MSK)
- License plate: 6

Bykhaw or Bykhov (Note: Belarusian: Быхаў, romanized: Bychaŭ, IPA: [ˈbɨxaʊ]; Russian: Быхов; Polish: Bychów; Yiddish: ביחאָוו, romanized: Bihov; Lithuanian: Bychavas.) is a town in Mogilev Region, Belarus. It is located 44 kilometres (27 mi) south of Mogilev, and serves as the administrative center of Bykhaw District. In 2009, its population was 17,031. As of 2025, it has a population of 16,296.

== History ==
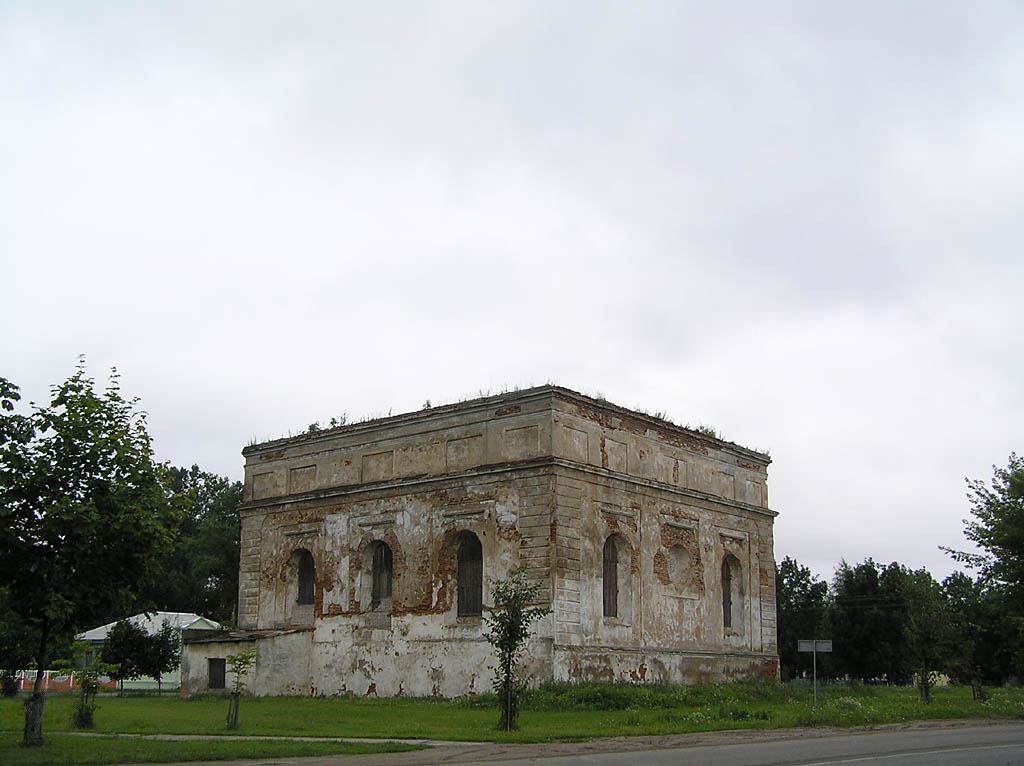
Synagogue

The settlement was first mentioned in the 14th century. It was a private town of the Chodkiewicz and Sapieha families, located within the Polish–Lithuanian Commonwealth. In 1619, Jan Karol Chodkiewicz erected the Catholic church of the Immaculate Conception of Blessed Virgin Mary, rebuilt by the Sapiehas in 1765. The synagogue was built in the 1640s. The town was an important fortress known for hard battles. It withstood several sieges until its capture by the Russians in 1659, who then committed a massacre of its Jewish residents. It was recaptured by Stefan Czarniecki in 1660. The town was annexed by Russia in the First Partition of Poland in 1772. In the late 19th century the town hosted two annual fairs. Residents traded in grain, hemp, flax, honey, wax and wood.

During World War II, Bychaw was occupied by the German Army from 5 July 1941 until 28 June 1944 and placed under the administration of the Generalbezirk Weißruthenien of Reichskommissariat Ostland. The Jews of Bykhov were killed in two mass shootings in September and November 1941. According to the German and Soviet archives, there were 4,600 Jews from Bykhaw who were shot in Voronino.

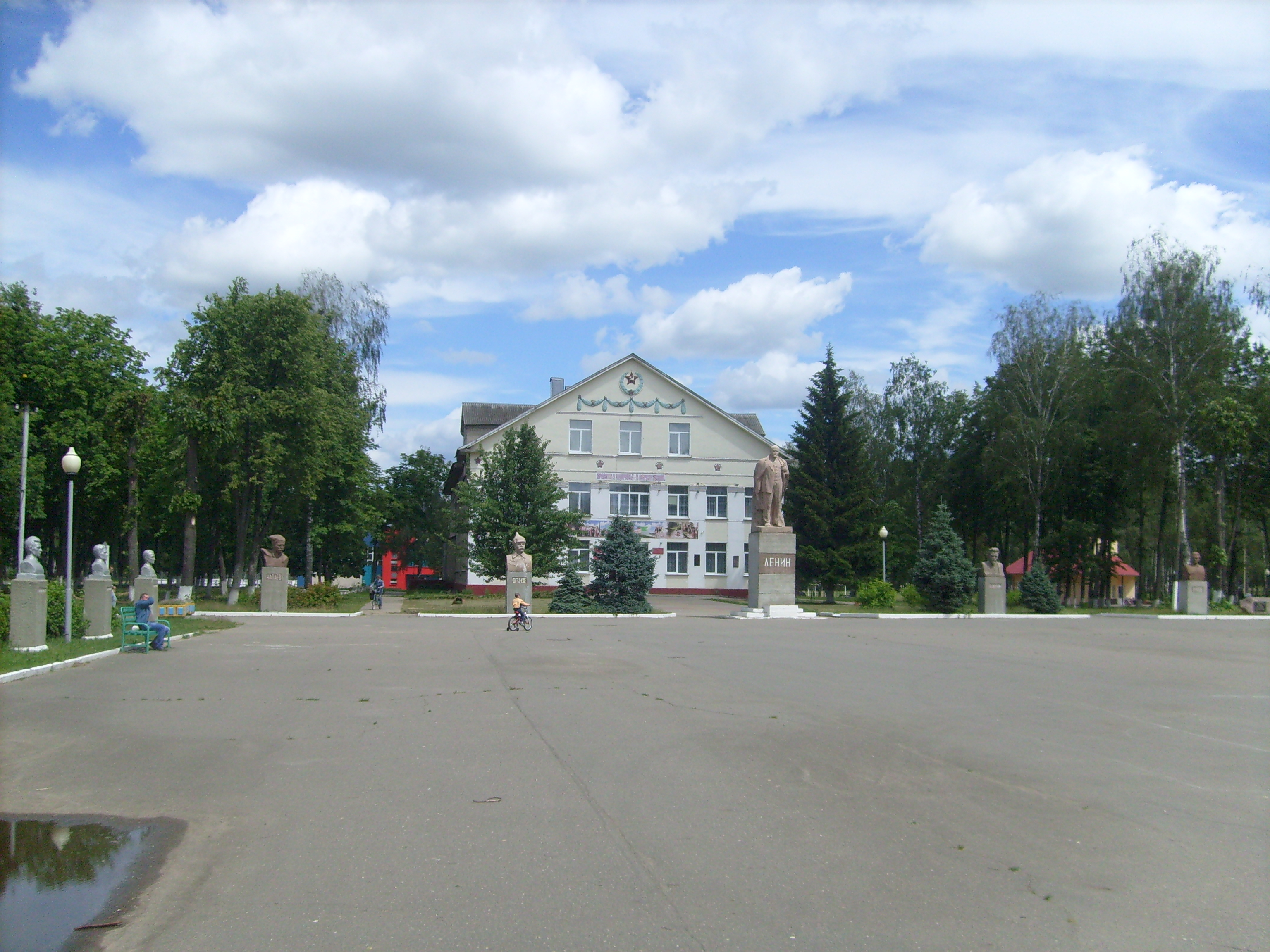
Bykhov-1, Heroes Plaza, former Officer House, now House of Culture

There is an abandoned military airfield, Bykhov airfield inside a military townlet called Bykhov-1, which is now a microdistrict of Bykhaw.

== Attractions ==
=== Bykhov Castle ===
An early 17th-century palace and castle complex on the banks of the Dnieper River. It remains in ruins and is undergoing restoration.

=== Synagogue ===
A monument of early 17th-century Baroque architecture, with a round tower and loopholes. It is an example of a defensive church, which served as a well-defended fortress during military operations. Built in the 1620s.

The synagogue blocked access from adjacent streets in the northwestern part of the city. It has simple cornices and shallow rectangular niches. Windows with semicircular arched ends are set high. The square hall inside is divided by four pillars into nine equal parts, covered by vaults. The building is a central structure measuring 20 x 21 meters, with walls approximately 2 meters thick. A distinctive feature of the structure is the round corner tower, which protrudes significantly beyond the main structure. This tower gives the structure a fortress-like character. The placement of windows at a considerable height and the loopholes in the attic tier also indicate the defensive nature of the building. Apparently, it played a specific role in the system of a privately owned fortified city-fortress.

=== Grudinovsky Palace and Park Ensemble ===
It was created throughout the 19th century. In the center of the estate, on a hill, stands a brick palace built in the classical style. The park in front of the palace, laid out in the first half of the 19th century, has a regular layout. Nearly 60 species of trees and shrubs grew in the park. A few trees have survived: Siberian cedar pine, snake-leaved spruce, pyramidal oak, Crimean linden, arborvitaes, Canadian poplar, fir, blue spruce, and Pennsylvania ash. Thanks to its harmonious blend of architecture and greenery, the estate in Grudinovka is one of the most valuable monuments of landscape architecture in the republic.

=== Holy Trinity Church ===
This monument of national significance was built in the mid-19th century. The wooden church building, cruciform in plan, stands on a brick, plastered foundation. The transept wings and the altar are pentagonal. At their intersection on the eastern side are two small sacristies with sloping roofs. Hip roofs cover the apse and side sections. Entrances on three sides of the building are wide brick steps with canopies supported by wooden columns. A tall, octagonal, three-tiered bell tower stands above the main entrance to the church. Behind it is a large, light-colored drum (8 meters in diameter, 12.5 meters in height) with a dome topped with a cap on an octagonal base. The walls of the second tier of the bell tower are pierced by semicircular window openings, while those of the third are rectangular. A cornice runs along the perimeter of the building. The church facades are vertically paneled with boards. The windows are semicircular. In the interior, the central part is covered with interlocking vaults.
