= 238th Rifle Division =

238th Rifle Division (March 14, 1941 - May 24, 1942) 238th Rifle Division (June 15, 1942 - July 1945)
- Active: 1941–1945
- Country: Soviet Union
- Branch: Red Army
- Type: Infantry
- Size: Division
- Engagements: Operation Typhoon; Battle of Moscow; Kaluga Offensive operation Battles of Rzhev; Operation Mars; Operation Kutuzov; Novyi Bykhov-Propoisk Offensive; Bykhov-Chavusy Offensive; Operation Bagration; Mogilev offensive Osovets offensive Vistula–Oder offensive East Pomeranian offensive Danzig Offensive Operation; Berlin Strategic Offensive Operation
- Decorations: Order of the Red Banner (1st & 2nd Formations); Order of Suvorov (2nd Formation); Order of Kutuzov (2nd Formation)
- Battle honours: Karachev (2nd Formation)

Commanders
- Notable commanders: Maj. Gen. Gennady Korotkov; Col. Gavriil Antonovich Kutalev; Col. Tikhon Fyodorovich Egoshin; Maj. Gen. Ivan Danilovich Krasnoshtanov

The 238th Rifle Division was an infantry division of the Red Army, originally formed in the months just before the start of the German invasion, based on the shtat (table of organization and equipment) of September 13, 1939. It was the highest-numbered rifle division to be formed prior to the war. After forming in Kazakhstan it did not begin moving west until later September and arrived in 49th Army southwest of Moscow just after the first phase of Operation Typhoon. During October and November it took part in the defense of Tula before going over to the counteroffensive in early December. The division assisted in the liberation of Aleksin before pushing on toward Kaluga. After the latter place was taken on December 30 it was committed to the attempted encirclement of a large portion of Army Group Center by Western and Kalinin Fronts, and while this ultimately failed the 238th distinguished itself sufficiently to be awarded the Order of the Red Banner and to be redesignated as the 30th Guards Rifle Division in May 1942.

A new 238th was formed in the Moscow Military District on June 15, 1942. After a period for training and a couple of preliminary assignments in Kalinin Front it was moved to 22nd Army before the start of the Second Rzhev–Sychyovka offensive operation (Operation Mars). This Army was to conduct a supporting attack up the valley of the Luchesa River and while it gained some ground this was at significant cost and proved to be of no value after the main attacks failed. After a period in the Reserve of the Supreme High Command for rebuilding the 238th returned to the fighting front in time to take part in Operation Kutuzov, during which it was awarded a battle honor. Following this victory it advanced through western Russian into Belarus as part of 50th Army, gradually gaining ground toward the Dniepr River through the winter of 1943/44. During the Soviet summer offensive in June it crossed this river and assisted in the liberation of Mogilev and other places and was awarded the Order of the Red Banner, along with all three of its rifle regiments. During the pursuit into Poland the division was transferred to the same 49th Army the 1st formation had fought under, winning further distinctions in the process. As part of 2nd Belorussian Front it drove into Poland and Pomerania, assisting in the liberation of Gdańsk before moving west to play a secondary role in the final campaign in Germany. Along with many successful rifle divisions it was surplus to peacetime requirements and was disbanded in July 1945.

== 1st Formation ==
The 238th began forming on March 14, 1941 at Alma-Ata, Kazakhstan in the Central Asia Military District, based on the 499th Reserve Rifle Regiment, and so began with personnel mostly of Kazakh nationality. When completed it had the following order of battle:

- 830th Rifle Regiment
- 837th Rifle Regiment
- 843rd Rifle Regiment
- 693rd Light Artillery Regiment
- 74th Antitank Battalion
- 494th Mortar Battalion
- 312th Reconnaissance Company
- 409th Sapper Battalion
- 616th Signal Battalion
- 397th Medical/Sanitation Battalion
- 238th Chemical Defense (Anti-gas) Company
- 707th Motor Transport Company
- 254th Field Bakery
- 690th Field Postal Station
- 563rd Field Office of the State Bank

Col. Gennady Korotkov was appointed to command of the division on the day it began forming. On June 22 it was still in the Central Asia District at Semipalatinsk and by the beginning of July it had come under command of the 58th Rifle Corps. Until the beginning of August it remained in the same situation, a likely indication it was still not completely formed. Late that month the 58th Corps, along with four cavalry divisions, was organized as an operational group, which was intended to take part in the Anglo-Soviet invasion of Iran, but as the situation before Moscow deteriorated the 238th left 58th Corps and began moving west. At the beginning of October it was in the Reserve of the Supreme High Command, and on October 10 it went into action at Leninsk, north of Tula, as part of 49th Army in Western Front.

== Battle of Moscow ==
49th Army had been in Reserve Front in the earlier stages of Operation Typhoon, but both that and Western Front had been severely damaged during the offensive's first ten days. By October 15 the Army had been forced to retreat from Kaluga and was retreating to the east and northeast. By October 23 the 238th had relieved the 5th Guards Rifle Division in the Aleksin area. The division was defending on the east bank of the Oka River to the south of Tarusa, along a line from Bunyrevo to Shchukino, repulsing efforts of the German XXXXIII Army Corps to cross the river using its artillery and mortar fire. Over the next two days German pressure increased and while the division continued to beat back all attacks on Aleksin, Tarusa was taken from the 60th Rifle Division at 1600 hours on October and the attackers continued to advance on Serpukhov.

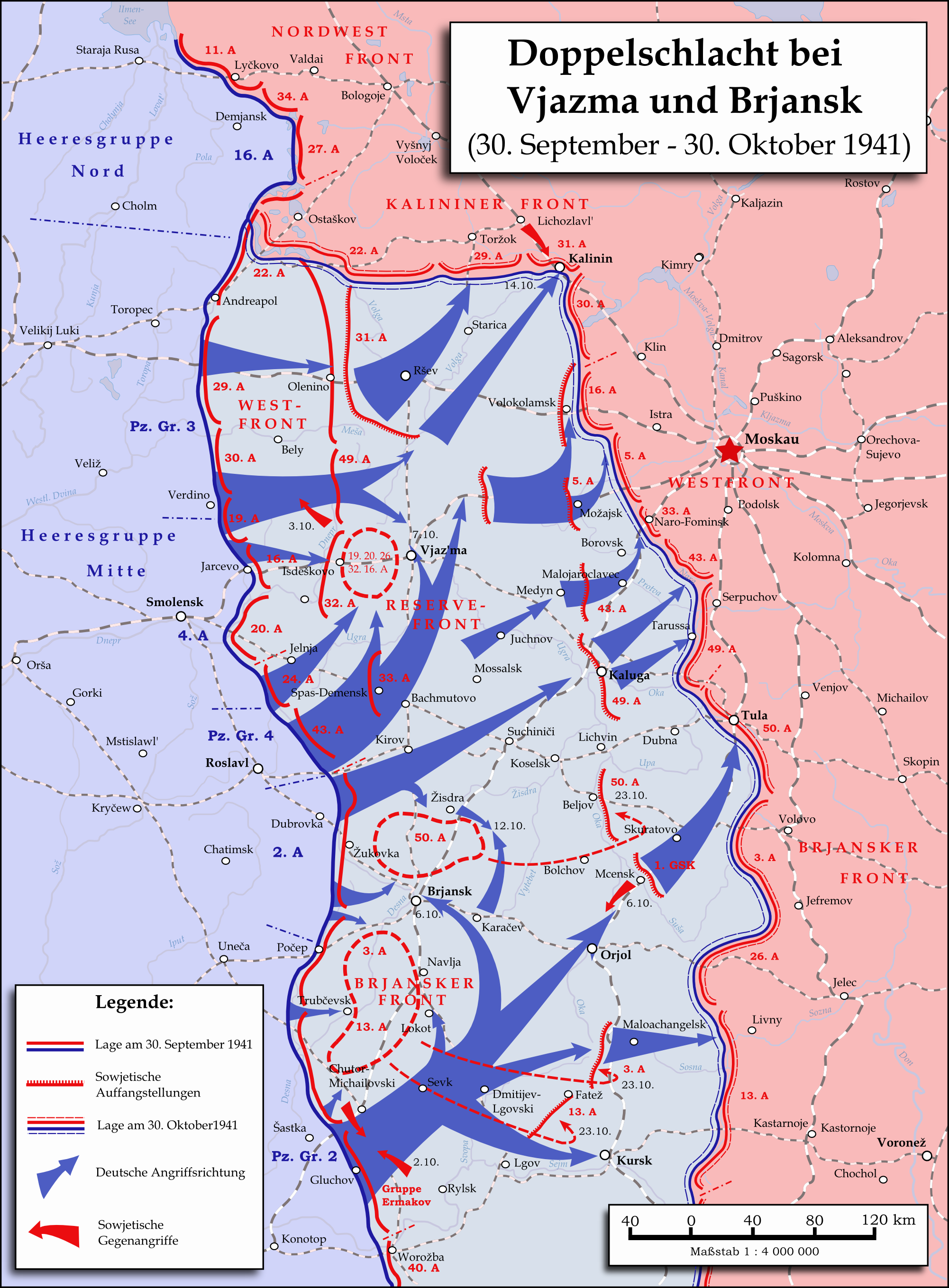
Operation Typhoon. Note positions of 49th Army as of October 30.

In the following period up to November 1 combat activities along 49th Army's front were characterized by separate collisions for the purpose of improving the position along the occupied lines. By the end of October the Army was solidly holding the line of the woods east of Burinovo–Voronino–Borovna, and then along the northern and eastern banks of the Protva and Oka as far as Aleksin. Over the next 10 days the 238th continued to hold it positions, repulsing various attempts to force the Oka, while the 60th, with the help of the 5th Guards, managed to retake some lost ground. This greatly aided the defense of Tula as it prevented the Moscow road from being cut near Serpukhov.

On November 9 the 50th Army, which was responsible for the direct defense of Tula, was reassigned from Bryansk Front to Western Front. On the same day a German force struck the boundary of the 49th and 50th Armies and broke through to the area of Spas-Kanino. The two Armies were ordered to liquidate the breakthrough by joint flank attacks. In accordance with this directive the 49th Army commander, Lt. Gen. I. G. Zakharkin, assigned Colonel Korotkov the following mission on November 10:

Carry out a regrouping during the night of November 10-11, removing everything possible from the division's secondary sectors and move the units to their jumping-off points to defeat the enemy attacking in the direction of Nikulino and Sukhodol.

The time for the attack was set for 0800 on November 11 but this resulted in a meeting engagement as the German force continued its advance. Over the following night further units on the left flank of 49th Army were regrouped to reinforce the counterattack. On the morning of the 12th the 238th attacked and occupied Sukromna, Danilovka and Sukhodol while units of 50th Army pushed into the German flank and rear near the latter place. The division continued the battle the next day along it left flank, fending off German counterattacks. Particularly stubborn fighting occurred on November 14 in the area of Sukromna and Kolyupanovo when German units managed to retake the latter place. The flank forces of the two Soviet Armies continued to contest the area During November 15-16. As a result the XXXXIII Corps was prevented from reaching the Tula-Moscow road and was forced to go over to the defensive on several sectors.

In the days following November 18 the 238th took up a defense along the line Bunyrevo–Aleksin–Nikulino. It was ordered to maintain a mobile reserve of no less than a rifle battalion in strength. On November 24, following a powerful preparation with mortar and machine gun fire, German reconnaissance parties attempted to pierce the forward edge of the division's defense but were repelled with losses. On the morning of November 27 more than three regiments of the 52nd and 31st Infantry Divisions attacked the entire front of the 238th and captured Bunyrevo, Pogiblovo, and four other villages. A divisional counterattack retook the first two places but was otherwise unsuccessful. The German effort, now supported by air attacks, continued the next day, pressing the division's left flank. In response Zakharkin subordinated a battalion of the 5th Guards, plus a battalion of a howitzer regiment, to Korotkov's support. During November 29-30 the division remained under attack by up to four regiments, particularly in the area of the woods north of Abryutino. By the end of November 30 a turning point had been reached along 49th Army's left flank. The 238th, having been reinforced, attacked on the morning of December 1 in order to restore the situation. During December 2-5 fighting occurred with variable success on both sides, although the division retained the offensive initiative.

=== Tula Offensive Operation ===
By December 7 the divisions of 2nd Panzer Army, which had advanced to the north and east of Tula, began to fall back. To the northwest of the city German forces were attempting to hold in the Aleksin area. 49th Army, now with six rifle divisions under command, was occupying a line from the woods east of Burinovo to along the east bank of the Protva to Podmoklovo, then along the east bank of the Oka as far as Sotino, from where it swerved to the southeast and passed through Nikulino to the boundary of 50th Army. As of December 7 the 238th's frontage was roughly 14 km (8.7 mi) wide. Deep snow cover of up to 80cm added to the difficulty of offensive operations. In accordance with a Front directive (No. 093/op) of December 10 the 49th was tasked with encircling and destroying the German grouping operating between the Oka and Upa Rivers in the Aleksin area. For this purpose it was reinforced with two more divisions from 50th Army plus 20 tanks. The main blow was to be in the direction of Shchukino while the 238th would team up with the two reinforcing divisions (173rd and 340th) to strike the 31st and 131st Infantry Divisions near Aleksin.

On the night of December 4/5 the 238th attacked German units along the sector Savino–Kaznacheevo–Morgen Rot and occupied these places. From December 6 it was waging defensive battles along its entire front, beating off attacks from the Aleksin area. In response to Front Order No. 093/op General Zakharkin formed a separate operational group from the 238th, 173rd and 340th. The group was assigned the following general tasks on December 12:

- the main blow is to be made by the forces of the 340th and 173rd rifle divisions toward Pleshivka and Shchukino;
- a supporting blow is to be made by the forces of the 238th Rifle Division and the 20th Guards Mortar Battalion in the direction of Bunyrevo and Aleksin, for the purpose of encircling and destroying the enemy's Aleksin group...

The division was supposed to reach the line Kashcheevo–Shelepino by day's end on December 15. The security of its right flank was entrusted to a specially-selected reinforced company, which would cross the Oka in order to get into the German rear on the western outskirts of Aleksin. The offensive was to begin at 0700 hours on December 14. In the morning the division retook Bunyrevo and Pogiblovo, encircled Botnya, and began fighting for Goryanovo despite stubborn resistance and the presence of tanks. As German reserves arrived the 238th was again forced to relinquish Bunyrevo and Pogiblovo. The next day it held off numerous counterattacks and had to face flamethrower attacks in the Botnya area.

A further Front Order (No. 0104/op) was issued on December 13. In accordance with this, Zakharkin ordered a general offensive to begin on December 16; the left-flank divisions were again directed to destroy the German Aleksin grouping before developing the success to the northwest in the Petrishchevo direction. The three divisions broke through the German defense along the line Bunyrevo–Naryshkino–Popovka, reached the Oka at 1530 hours on December 17, captured Aleksin and pushed on to the northwest as German units abandoned equipment and withdrew under the cover of rearguards. By now the divisions were advancing up to 8 km (5.0 mi) per day in the direction of Vysokinichi and Nedelnoye. On the night of December 18/19 Zakharkin was directed to send part of the forces of 5th Guards and 60th Divisions south of the Protva to reinforce the shock group's right flank. Meanwhile, the 238th and 173rd were to reach the line Latynino–Bogorodskoe–Yelkino with their main forces.

As the offensive continued the 238th encountered strong resistance on December 19 and did not capture Petrishchevo until near the end of the next day, after which it continued in the direction of Kareevo. During December 20-22 the division crossed its main forces over the Tarusa River along the Pimenovo–Lotrevo sector. It was then ordered, along with the 173rd, to continue the pursuit and by the end of December 23 to reach the line Afanasevo–Detchino–Torbeevo. By December 25 the division was being backed up by the 30th Rifle Brigade as it fought for the line Nedelnoe–Bashmakova. The 5th Guards and 23rd Tank Brigade were also moved up to form part of the second echelon. The battle for Nedelnoe continued through the 27th, in large part because the German command considered it the key to the Kaluga–Maloyaroslavets railroad. Opportunities to bypass Nedelnoe and Bashmakova were not fully taken advantage of by the Army and divisional commands.

==== Kaluga Offensive Operation ====
Beginning on December 16 Western Front had its sights set on retaking Kaluga with the 49th and 50th Armies. The city was in the operational zone of the 49th's left flank forces, and it was tasked with liberating it by a blow from the east. To this end, Lt. Gen. I. V. Boldin of 50th Army formed a mobile group; taking Kaluga was expected to drive a wedge between 2nd Panzer Army and 4th Army. The mobile group reached the southern approaches to the city by the end of December 20. It broke into the city on December 22 but became involved in street fighting over the next two days. As of December 26 the attack of the 238th was being held up in the Nedelnoe area by a battle group of the 17th Infantry Division. On the morning of December 30 this place was finally taken in a combined attack by the division and the 19th Rifle Brigade. Leaving behind some of its forces to mop up, the remainder of the division launched an attack toward Vosnesene, 4 km (2.5 mi) to the southwest. Kaluga was finally liberated on the same day. In the following days the 238th transferred to the Army's left flank and arrived there after encountering strong resistance at Torbeevo.

==== Fighting for Polotnyany Zavod ====
During the January 1-9, 1942 period the division was involved in heavy fighting, particularly with the German units defending the area of Torbeevo and Nizhnie Gorki, which had been turned into a strong fortified junction. 49th Army estimated up to 2,000 infantry, with artillery and mortars, had been concentrated here. It was only by the morning of January 11, by enveloping Torbeevo from the north, that the division was able to overcome German resistance and force a retreat. Three days later the Western Front's military council assigned its latest objectives to it left-wing armies:

... to complete the defeat of the enemy's Kondrovo-Yukhnov group and then, with a blow toward Vyazma, to encircle and capture the enemy's Gzhatsk-Vyazma group in conjunction with the armies of the Kalinin Front and the Western Front's center armies.

The 238th had already been ordered to move its main forces to the Redkino area, while its forward units were to take Polotnyany Zavod. The latter place, along with Kondrovo, had been previously fortified in order to cover the approaches to the Warsaw–Minsk highway. In order to envelop Polotnyany Zavod from the southeast an independent ski battalion was sent forward along the south bank of the Sukhodrev River.

Despite stubborn resistance by the German units in the area of Kashenka, 3 km (1.9 mi) south of Redkino, the division occupied that locale by the morning of January 14. The 49th Army's advance continued overnight and several centers north of Polotnyany Zavod were outflanked. The division left a regiment near Zhilnevo to pin down the German forces south of that place and crossed the Shanya River with its main forces by the morning of January 17 and, having bypassed Durnevo, reached the eastern approaches to Beli, where fighting broke out. This movement had been carried out under strong flanking fire from Durnevo and Mukovinino. After a regrouping on the morning of January 18 the 173rd Division was directed to bypass Polotnyany Zavod from the south so as to develop the 238th's advance in the direction of Surnevo, Sloboda, and Galkino, which was intended to cut off the retreat path of the German Kondrovo group. By the end of January 19 it was planned to move the division to the Potapovo. Meanwhile, the 173rd and 133rd Rifle Divisions took Polotnyany Zavod by the end of January 18 while the 238th engaged some 500 heavily armed men at Beli. Following the victory at Polotnyany Zavod the German forces fell back to a new prepared position from Aidarovo to Ostrozhnoe to Potapovo. After reaching this line the division ran into strong resistance in Dorokhi and fought for this place until January 28. By this time the entire German line had been broken and its defenders fell back to Rudenka–Fedyukovo–Shimaevka. After January 31 the Army, in conjunction with 50th Army was attacking along the Warsaw highway and enveloping Yukhnov from the northeast.

=== Rzhev–Vyazma Offensive ===
The offensives of Western and Kalinin Fronts had jointly created the Rzhev salient by late February. Due to counterattacks the 33rd Army, attacking toward Vyazma, had been encircled and late in February the 49th and 50th Armies received orders from Western Front to break the German lines to effect a rescue by March 27. These efforts failed and 33rd Army was mostly destroyed by mid-April. On April 21, after months of continuous fighting on the Ugra River near Yukhnov, the 238th was withdrawn 6–8 km from the front line to the 49th Army reserve for rest and replenishment. Colonel Korotkov was given the concurrent assignment of chief of staff of the Army on May 2, and the next day he was promoted to the rank of major general. This coincided with the official announcement that the division as a whole had been awarded the Order of the Red Banner. On May 10 Korotkov handed his command over to Col. Maksim Gavrilovich Kirillov, but this officer was in turn replaced on May 16 by Col. Andrei Danilovich Kuleshov, who had previously led the 64th Naval Rifle Brigade. On May 24 General Korotkov returned to the division, which was redesignated as the 30th Guards Rifle Division the same day. This division inherited the Order of the Red Banner won by the 238th.

== 2nd Formation ==
A new 238th began forming on June 15, 1942 at Arzamas, Nizhny Novgorod Oblast, in the Moscow Military District, based on an unidentified rifle brigade. When completed it had the following order of battle:

- 830th Rifle Regiment
- 837th Rifle Regiment
- 843rd Rifle Regiment
- 693rd Artillery Regiment
- 74th Antitank Battalion
- 312th Reconnaissance Company
- 409th Sapper Battalion
- 616th Signal Battalion (later 616th, 382nd Signal Companies)
- 397th Medical/Sanitation Battalion
- 341st Chemical Defense (Anti-gas) Company
- 272nd Motor Transport Company
- 141st Field Bakery
- 47th Divisional Veterinary Hospital
- 1997th Field Postal Station
- 447th Field Office of the State Bank

The division came under command of Col. Gavriil Antonovich Kutalev on the day it began forming. This officer had previously led the 331st Rifle Division but had been shell-shocked in an attack in early March and had recently been released from hospital. By July 1 it had been assigned to 9th Reserve Army in the Reserve of the Supreme High Command. After less than two months in the reserves the division was assigned to the 43rd Army, which went to Kalinin Front in September. On October 3 the 238th entered the fighting front, and later in the month it was shifted to 41st Army. Colonel Kutalev left the division on October 29 due to a recurrence shell-shock, handing over to Col. Ilya Vasilevich Kaprov. This officer had previously led the 1075th/19th Guards Rifle Regiment of the 316th/8th Guards Rifle Division in the famous defense of the Volokolamsk Highway during the Battle of Moscow, which included the Panfilov's Twenty-Eight Guardsmen; he had more recently commanded the 31st Rifle Brigade. In November the 238th was reassigned to 22nd Army, still in Kalinin Front, in preparation for the next offensive against the Rzhev salient.

== Operation Mars ==
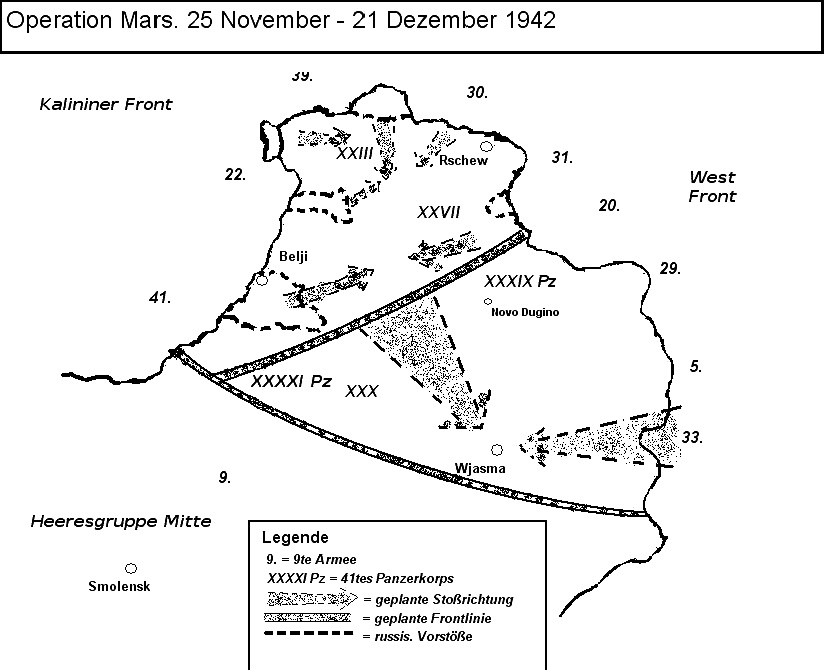
Operation Mars. Note position of 22nd Army and penetration into the Luchesa valley.

22nd Army was under command of Lt. Gen. V. A. Yushkevich and consisted of about 80,000 personnel, as well as 270 tanks due to the presence of the 3rd Mechanized Corps. The Army faced relatively weak defenses along the valley of the Luchesa River held by the 216th Grenadier Regiment of the 86th Infantry Division of XXXXI Panzer Corps and the 252nd Grenadier Regiment of the 110th Infantry Division of XXIII Army Corps. Yushkevich's characteristic plan was to attack at the boundary between the two divisions while also staging a demonstration attack with his 362nd Rifle Division. The Army carried out an extensive regrouping prior to the start of the offensive, moving up the 3rd Mechanized while Colonel Kaprov concentrated all three of his rifle regiments on the flank of the 185th Rifle Division, with just one rifle battalion remaining to cover his division's long right flank. The two divisions were to attack early in the morning of November 25, penetrate the German defenses, and clear a passage for the mechanized forces to advance up the valley.

The terrain facing the Army was formidable. The river was narrow and winding, flanked on both sides by heavy forests and frozen swamps. There was one improved track that followed the river and few tracks to follow through the forests. The nearest real road was that which linked Olenino to Bely, almost 20 km (12 mi) from the front. The artillery preparation began at 0730 hours and shortly before 0900 the men of the 238th went into the attack. While the artillery had been effective in many places, the scattered nature of the German strongpoint defense made it impossible to eliminate every position. Thus, while some forward battalions made good progress, others were held up by fire from undestroyed German bunkers. Moreover, the tank support provided by 3rd Mechanized, which amounted to a tank company for each assaulting rifle battalion, was uneven due to the terrain and uncleared minefields. Kaprov's two first echelon regiments penetrated German defenses in the forests west and south of Petrovka, but progress was slowed in the forests behind. 49th Tank Brigade was supposed to begin supporting the infantry at noon, but arrived late and was also slowed by the forest fighting. By day's end the combined force had reached the German defenses at Tolkachi, south of the Luchesa and just 2 km (1.2 mi) from the start line.

At dawn on the following day, after another artillery preparation, the assault was renewed. Kaprov launched repeated attacks against the German defenses and, finally, toward nightfall, captured the Tolkachi strongpoint. The casualty toll was high and the advance was delayed by the late arrival of the 1st Mechanized Brigade. Upon instructions from Yushkevich, Kaprov reconcentrated his division and planned a new attack for November 27. This would be made more difficult by the arrival of German reserves in the form of the 2nd Battalion of the Grenadier Regiment of Großdeutschland Motorized Division. Early in the day the 22nd Army finally began experiencing some success. The 238th pressed the German forces back into the village of Karskaya while 49th Tanks raced into the open country south of Starukhi until they were halted north of Goncharovo by fresh German infantry. Yushkevich believed that the penetration was finally occurring but by nightfall the advance had again ground to a halt against stiffening resistance.

Kalinin Front expected a decisive attack on November 28 that would clear the Luchesa valley and drive to the Olenino–Bely road, but the arrival of Großdeutschland turned the battle into a two-day vicious slugfest. An overnight regrouping was hindered by driving snow, and the planned attack was delayed until noon. Early on November 29 both sides attacked virtually simultaneously. The 49th Tanks and 10th Mechanized Brigade, together with the 238th, smashed the German defenses at Goncharovo and drove west through the forests in the face of the counterattacking 1st Battalion of Großdeutschland's Grenadiers. 50mm antitank gun fire made little impression on the T-34s and KV-1 tanks but the fire of 88mm antiaircraft guns destroyed 15 tanks and halted the attack just short of the village of Smolkovo, only 8 km (5.0 mi) from the Olenino road. Both sides were equally exhausted at this point and at nightfall Yushkevich would have preferred to halt, but Army Gen. G. K. Zhukov, in overall command of the offensive, insisted that the attack continue "at all costs." The German battalion in Smolkovo was encircled, but managed to make its way back to Gorovatka in heavy fighting. As of November 30 the 22nd Army had lost almost half of its initial tanks and infantry losses, including to the 238th, exceeded 50 percent.

Despite his misgivings, Yushkevich issued new orders in the early hours of December 1 to renew the attack at dawn in a staggered manner with all his forces following the strongest artillery preparation he could muster. By now the operation had clearly failed on other some other sectors and Zhukov was determined to persist with any and all successes achieved to date. As part of these orders the 238th was to attack with the 837th and 843rd Regiments in cooperation with the 49th Tanks and one battalion of the 10th Mechanized to clear German forces from the region south of the Luchesa and reach the Olenino road; the 830th Regiment swung westward to cover the south flank of the penetration. The fresh 39th Tank Regiment was also ordered forward to assist, but this movement was hampered by heavy new snowfall. In fighting whose intensity exceeded that of the day before, 22nd Army made steady but bloody progress. Bitter fighting raged along the approaches to Gorovatka and in the village itself, where, by nightfall, Soviet infantry and tanks had forced the defenders to retreat. The 49th Tanks was committed shortly before noon after elements of the 238th had seized Galitskina and then pushed the German forces eastward several kilometres to within 4 km (2.5 mi) of the Olenino road. Under heavy pressure the thin German defenses covering the road held, thanks to the timely arrival of a few reinforcing antitank guns.

Over the following two days Yushkevich barely altered his attack orders. On December 2 the Soviet forces south of the Luchesa reached to within 2 km (1.2 mi) of the highway and brought it under mortar fire. The next day he made a command change, moving Kaprov to take over the approaching 155th Rifle Division, which he judged needed more experienced leadership, and appointing Col. Tikhon Fyodorovich Egoshin to the 238th. Kaprov remained in command of this division until April 1944 when he was forced to join the training establishment due to ill health. Egoshin had been serving most recently as Yushkevich's head of intelligence. At nightfall Egoshin, along with the armor forces, was ordered to regroup the division in anticipation of new assaults within several days. In fact, the 22nd Army was completely burnt out by this time, having lost over 200 tanks and roughly 60 percent of its infantry.

Yushkevich planned to resume his attack at 0900 hours on December 7. However, before dawn on December 6 German motorized reinforcements began arriving along the highway. The counterattack that followed threw 22nd Army completely off balance and drove it back to 6 km (3.7 mi) distance from the highway; most of the Army's sparse reserves were consumed in efforts to regain lost positions. Nevertheless, he was ordered to carry out his planned attack the next morning, which predictably failed. The efforts continued until December 11 when Zhukov called a halt. Yushkevich was removed from command on December 15, replaced by Maj. Gen. D. M. Seleznev. The next day this officer noted the movement of German reserves northward from Bely as the Red Army forces in that sector had been defeated. During December 20-21 a German armored task force skirmished with forward elements of the 830th Rifle Regiment, which was still holding the south flank at Zabolote. Unable to restrain the pressure, at midday on December 21 the regiment withdrew northward through the heavy forests and took up stronger defenses at Malinovka, 4 km (2.5 mi) southeast of Karskaya, where other elements of the division had formed a strong antitank defense. Late that day the German forces attacked at Malinovka and, after a heavy two-day battle, captured it and advanced on Karskaya. With the help of the 155th Division Egoshin halted the German drive short of that place by December 23 and inflicted enough damage on the attackers that it could not be renewed.

As this fighting was going on, other German reserves were observed swinging in a wide arc eastward and then northward along the road to Emelianki. On December 24 the German forces began probing attacks toward Galitskina but these were halted by the 238th and 155th Divisions. At about this time General Seleznev was informed that Operation Mars was officially ended, but there was little solace in this because the Luchesa salient, the only major achievement remaining from the operation, now became a prime target for counterattacks. On December 30 the German forces struck again against the Army's positions north and south of the river but after three days of fighting had made gains of just 3–4 km (1.9–2.5 mi). On January 1, 1943, Gen. W. Model, commander of German 9th Army, called off further attempts to eliminate the salient.

== Operation Kutuzov ==
In a report dated January 4 the chief of staff of Kalinin Front listed "shortcomings in the organization of the defense" in which the division was specifically noted:

... 4. Primarily only people in the rear units and facilities have been provided with warm items, while at the same time the soldiers and officers of the combat units have not received winter uniforms (the 185th, 238th and others).
5. Weapons, as a consequence of the lack of care in the combat units, are rusty, filthy, rifles lack foresights; many of the automatic weapons no longer fire automatically because of defects, and heavy machine guns are not operable (185th, 362nd, 238th Rifle Divisions and others).
It is necessary to take urgent measures to eliminate the shortcomings noted above. Report regarding the measures you have taken by 7 January 1943. -- Antonov

Before the end of the month the division had left 22nd Army for the 4th Shock Army in the same Front. Colonel Egoshin left the division on February 22 to take over the 114th Rifle Brigade. He would go on to command the 332nd Rifle Division and be promoted to the rank of major general but would die of wounds after his position was struck by German artillery while leading his 1119th Rifle Regiment in a crossing of the Dubna River on August 1, 1944. Col. Ivan Danilovich Krasnoshtanov, who had previously led the 139th Rifle Division, took command of the 238th on February 23 and he would hold this post for the duration of the war, being promoted to major general on September 1, 1943. On March 11, in accordance with STAVKA Order No. 46075, the division returned to the Reserve of the Supreme High Command at Plavsk for extensive rebuilding.

In April the division moved to the reserves of Bryansk Front, where it joined the 185th and 362nd Divisions to form the 25th Rifle Corps, where it remained through the spring operational pause and the first stage of the Battle of Kursk. By the start of August the other divisions had left the Corps, and in a report that month it was noted that 70 percent of the division's personnel were of the year group 1924, indicating that the losses from Operation Mars had been largely replaced by a very young cadre. When it returned to the fighting front it was assigned to the 46th Rifle Corps of Bryansk Front's 11th Army.

In the initial planning for the counteroffensive against the Oryol salient, which became Operation Kutuzov, the 25th Corps was designated for developing any successes along the 3rd Army's sector, but the 362nd and 185th were committed before the 238th, and under other commands. By August 12 the 11th Army was closing in on the German stronghold of Karachev. At 0200 the reconnaissance battalions of the 25th and 46th Corps' divisions began their attack. The battalions broke through the forward screen and reached the forward edge of the defensive zone, and in places penetrated into the main zone of resistance. At noon the artillery opened up a powerful 30-minute bombardment, suppressing the German defense. Following this the main forces of the two Corps attacked against a stiff defense marked by heavy firepower and multiple counterattacks. By the end of August 14 the Soviet forces had completely broken through the defensive zone and reached the approaches to Karachev.

At 0300 hours on August 15 the immediate fighting for the town began. The Germans considered it significant as a road junction, supply base, and center of resistance and had concentrated units of the 78th and 34th Infantry Divisions, plus remnants of the 253rd and 293rd Infantry Divisions, 18th and 8th Panzer Divisions, and several other formations in its defense. The 238th and 369th Rifle Divisions outflanked the town from the northeast and north. At the same time two divisions of the 11th Guards Army struck from the east and southeast. The German grouping was unable to withstand the concentric attack; the Red Army force broke into Karachev at 0830 hours and completely occupied it. German casualties were assessed at 4,000 killed and wounded, and the remainder fell back to west, covered by rearguards. On the same day the division was awarded the name of the town as a battle honor.

== Into Western Russia and Belarus ==
Shortly after this victory the 46th Corps was moved to 50th Army, still in Bryansk Front. This Army was still under command of General Boldin. On October 10 the Front was disbanded and the Army came under command of Central Front, which was soon renamed Belorussian Front.

=== Novyi Bykhov-Propoisk Offensive ===
By the third week of November the left (south) flank of 50th Army had reached the confluence of the Sozh and Pronya Rivers east of the town of Propoisk, which is on the west bank of the Sozh. The Front commander, Army Gen. K. K. Rokossovsky, ordered his 3rd and 50th Armies to attack across the Sozh, with the 3rd beginning on November 22 and the 50th two days later in a supporting role. At this time the 46th Corps was defending along the Army's right wing, facing the German 9th Army's XXXXI Panzer Corps, and did not immediately take part in the attack. The 413th and 110th Rifle Divisions attacked in the Uzgorsk and Krasnaia Sloboda sector just north of Propoisk after a ten-minute artillery raid with the 108th Rifle Division in second echelon. These forces were able to cross the river and penetrate the German defense despite rasputitsa conditions and an almost complete absence of roads; in fact, the attack developed quite slowly until 10th Army to the north entered the offensive on November 28. By this time the 46th Corps had entered the penetration, led by the 369th Division, and the commander of 9th Army, General Model, convinced Hitler to allow him to withdraw to new defenses closer to the Dniepr. By November 30 the Army had advanced from 16 to 30 km (9.9 to 18.6 mi) on a 37 km (23 mi) front, with the 238th by now in the first echelon with four other divisions.

=== Bykhov-Chavusy Offensive ===
On January 4, 1944, a new offensive aimed at Bykhov and Chavusy was launched by elements of 3rd, 50th and 10th Armies. Under the plan for this offensive, 46th Corps was to be on call to exploit if it proved successful. While important gains were made, there was no breakthrough, in part due to the rifle divisions of all three armies numbering roughly 3,500 men each, and the 238th saw little action before the attack was suspended on January 8. During February the division left 46th Corps to join the 362nd Division in 19th Rifle Corps, still in 50th Army. In late March General Rokossovsky, whose command was now designated 1st Belorussian Front, produced a plan to eliminate the German bridgehead over the Dniepr, based on Mogilev. 50th Army formed a shock group based on 46th and 121st Rifle Corps, but the 238th was assigned a flank support role. In the event the attack, which began on March 25, collapsed after minimal gains and was called off on March 31, despite the division being committed to assist the 121st Corps in the last days.

=== Operation Bagration ===
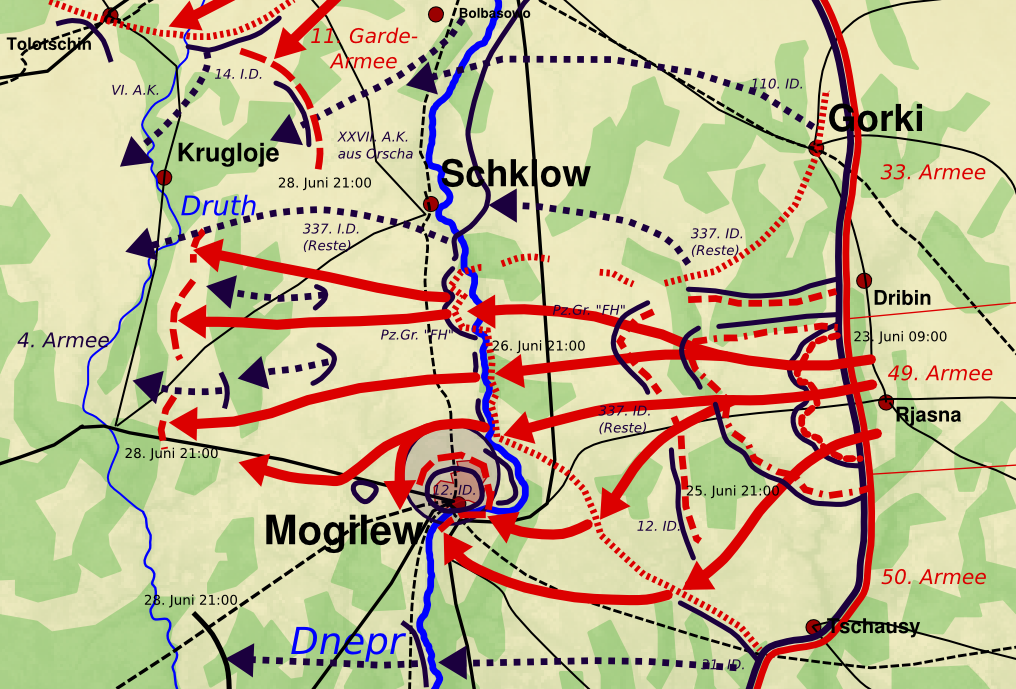
Mogilev Offensive. Note initial positions of 50th Army.

In April the 50th Army was reassigned to the newly created 2nd Belorussian Front; the 238th would remain in this Front for the duration. Just prior to the start of the Soviet summer offensive the division was moved to 121st Corps, joining the 380th Rifle Division. The Front's objective in the first phase was to break through the defenses of German 4th Army along the Pronya, force the Dniepr and liberate Mogilev, much the same as had been attempted in March. Following a 30-minute artillery preparation the operation began at 0400 hours on June 22 with a reconnaissance in force; on the 50th Army sector this was carried out by reinforced rifle battalions of the 380th and 385th Rifle Divisions, which gathered information on the German defensive system and took prisoners.

The main attack began the next day and, in general, 4th Army's defense held; however, the Army's commander was already seeking permission to withdraw his XXXIX Panzer Corps behind the Dniepr. On June 24, 121st Corps supported 49th Army's renewed attack on the 337th and Feldherrenhalle Divisions 30 km (19 mi) northeast of Mogilev. By noon a gap had been opened in the German Corps' defense and the 337th was breaking up, having lost most of its artillery. At 0600 hours on June 25 the Front's three attacking armies struck the German divisions and drove them back over the Basya River. Chavusy was taken by elements of 50th Army and by evening a column of 90 Soviet tanks and infantry in trucks was on the road to Mogilev. The order for the next day was to reach the Dniepr north and south of the city. On the XXXIX Panzer Corps sector to the south the 12th and 31st Infantry Divisions held prepared positions east of the Dniepr in the morning but were finally dislodged during the day by the 121st and 38th Rifle Corps' attacks. By 2200 hours the two corps were closing up to the east bank of the Dniepr.

On June 27 the 12th Infantry fell back to try to hold Mogilev itself. The next day the 49th and 50th Armies took the city after a stiff fight and heavy casualties. The two armies then began an all-out advance to the Drut River to the west. On July 1 on the Chervyen–Berezino road the composite Battle Group König (one regiment of the 31st Division and other remnants) was fighting the 38th and 19th Rifle Corps of 50th Army, which had crossed the Berezina River north of Brodets. Late in the morning Soviet tanks in Chervyen drove the German force farther west, at which point Boldin's army cut off 4th Army's remaining retreat route and headed for Minsk. On July 10 the 238th would be awarded the Order of the Red Banner for its role in the forcing of the Pronya and Dniepr and the liberation of the cities of Mogilev, Shklov and Bykhov. Unusually, all three of the division's rifle regiments also received the same decoration on the same date for their parts in this fighting.

As a result of the encirclement and destruction of 4th Army in the Minsk area there were no significant German forces in front of 3rd and 50th Armies as far as the Neman River. 50th Army (currently 121st and 70th Rifle Corps), advancing to the west behind the 3rd Army, forced the river on July 9 and was in the Shchors area. On the same day the Front commander, Col. Gen. G. F. Zakharov, assigned the two armies the task of continuing to vigorously pursue the scattered German groupings in the general direction of Białystok and by July 12 capture Grodno and reach the Svislach River. Later in the month the 121st Corps, along with the 238th, was transferred to 49th Army, and it would remain in this Army for the duration. From the end of July until mid-August it incorporated 1,800 replacements, mostly from the 58th and 185th Reserve Rifle Regiments. During the Osovets (Osowiec) Operation the 830th Rifle Regiment (Lt. Col. Smurygin, Georgii Efimovich) distinguished itself in the storming of the fortress and was awarded its name as a battle honor, while on September 1 the 837th and 843rd Regiments would each receive the Order of Alexander Nevsky for their roles in the same fighting. In a further distinction, on September 15 the division as a whole was given the Order of Suvorov, 2nd Degree, for its part in the liberation of the town and fortress of Łomża. In October the division was transferred to 70th Rifle Corps, where it remained until the war's end.

== Vistula-Oder Offensive ==
In the advance into Poland the 238th reached as far as the Narew River, where it would remain until the start of the Vistula-Oder Offensive. In the planning for this operation, 2nd Belorussian's Front's 3rd Army was to launch an attack along its left flank on a 6 km (3.7 mi) front, in the general direction of Janowo and Allenstein; 49th Army, while securely defending the Narew line from Novogrod to Chelsty with one corps would take advantage of 3rd Army's breakthrough to attack with its own main forces in the direction of Myszyniec. At this time the 70th Corps consisted of the 238th, 385th and 139th Rifle Divisions.

The offensive began on January 14, 1945, in conditions of poor visibility. 3rd Army crushed the resistance of the German units facing it, breaking through to a depth of 5 km (3.1 mi) on a 10 km (6.2 mi) front and creating the conditions for the 49th Army to follow. This advance began the next day, with 70th Corps in the Army's second echelon. On January 16 the 49th continued attacking along its left flank but ran into stubborn German resistance and gained only 2–3 km (1.2–1.9 mi) during the day. 70th Corps was deployed by the end of the day in an area 5–10 km (3.1–6.2 mi) northwest and northeast of Rozan. On January 18, the last day of the first phase of the offensive, the units of 49th Army continued to attack along the west bank of the Narew.

By February 10, 70th and 121st Corps relieved the forces of 70th Army on the left bank of the Vistula River along the line Kulm–Grodek–Sierosław–Lniano in preparation for the offensive into eastern Pomerania. On February 19 the 49th Army was ordered to continue its attack in the direction of Sominy and Bytów, with the task of capturing the line Sominy–Kloden–the Liaskasee by the end of February 24. This advance brought the Army's forces to the approaches to Gdańsk, and during the fourth stage of the offensive, from March 14 to 30, the 49th was one of the armies that cleared and occupied the city.

== Berlin Operation ==
At the start of the Berlin Strategic Offensive the rifle divisions of 2nd Belorussian Front varied in strength from 3,600 to 4,800 personnel each. 49th Army deployed on a 16 km (9.9 mi) front on the Oder River from Kranzfelde to Nipperwiese. The 238th was in the first echelon of 70th Corps with the 139th and 385th Divisions. During April 18–19 the Front launched intensive reconnaissance efforts in preparation for the crossings, including the elimination of German advance parties in the lowlands between the East and West Oder. The division's forces took part in this task and by the end of April 19 had reached the eastern bank of the West Oder. On April 23 the 49th Army tried to force the West Oder, but was hindered by German fire. In the Army's zone three ferry crossings, a 50-ton and a 16-ton bridge were in operation. During the day only a portion of 121st Corps' forces were able to cross. On April 25 the 49th Army exploited the greater success of the 65th and 70th Armies in their crossing operations and passed its remaining forces to the west bank along the Harz sector using the 70th Army's ferries. Attacking to the southwest and having beaten off five German counterattacks the Army advanced 5–6 km (3.1–3.7 mi) in the day's fighting, and by the evening part of the 70th Corps had reached a line between Gatow and Hohenfelde. Throughout April 29–30 49th Army attacked to the west, beginning in the Neustrelitz area, and on May 3 its forward detachments established contact with British Second Army advance units in the Grabow area.

On April 5 the 409th Sapper Battalion had been awarded the Order of the Red Star for its part in the fighting for the village of Chersk on the Bug River. On April 26 the 837th and 843rd Rifle Regiments each received the Order of Kutuzov, 3rd Degree, for their successes at Bytów and Kościerzyna on the march to Gdańsk, and on the same date the 693rd Artillery Regiment was given the Order of the Red Banner in recognition of its role in the fighting for Lauenburg and Kartuzy.

== Postwar ==
In a final award, on May 17 the division as a whole was granted the Order of Kutuzov, 2nd Degree, for its part in the liberation of Gdańsk. With this distinction the men and women of the division shared the full title of 238th Rifle, Karachev, Order of the Red Banner, Orders of Suvorov and Kutuzov Division. (Russian: 238-я стрелковая Карачевская Краснознамённая орденов Суворова и Кутузова дивизия.) Under the terms of STAVKA Order No. 11097 of May 29, 1945, part 6, 70th Corps was to be transferred to 1st Belorussian Front by June 3, and under Order No. 11095 of the same date the 238th is listed as one of the rifle divisions to be "disbanded in place". It was disbanded in accordance with the directive in July 1945.
