= Gennady Korotkov =

Soviet Military Commander

Gennady Petrovich Korotkov
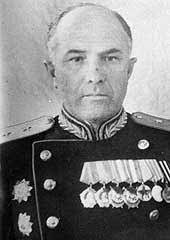
- Born: 18 August 1898; Gavrilov-Yam, Yaroslavl Governorate, Russian Empire
- Died: 23 November 1982 (aged 84) Voronezh, Soviet Union
- Allegiance: Russian Empire; Russian SFSR; Soviet Union
- Branch: Imperial Russian Army; Red Army (Soviet Army from 1946)
- Service years: 1916–1917; 1918–1958
- Rank: Lieutenant general
- Commands: 53rd Army; 22nd Army; 1st Shock Army; 25th Army
- Conflicts: World War I; Russian Civil War; World War II
- Awards: Order of Lenin (2)

Gennady Petrovich Korotkov (18 August 1898 – 23 November 1982) was a Soviet Army lieutenant general who held field army command during World War II.

== Early life and World War I ==
Gennady Petrovich Korotkov was born on 18 August 1898 in the city of Gavrilov-Yam, Yaroslavl Governorate. In December 1914 he began work as an errand boy at the weaving mill of Lokalov in Gavrilov-Yam, and from December 1915 was an unskilled laborer at the Maslennikov and Kuznetsov mill in Yaroslavl. He was conscripted into the Russian Imperial Army in August 1916 during World War I and enrolled in the 203rd Reserve Infantry Regiment at Oryol. That year he graduated from the regimental training detachment and then commanded a platoon of this regiment, reaching the rank of senior unter-ofitser.

== Russian Civil War ==
During the Russian Civil War, he joined the Mtsensk Red Guard detachment in October 1917 and was appointed a platoon commander in it. With the detachment, he took part in the disarmament of the junkers and cadets in Oryol. In February 1918 the detachment was reorganized into the 1st Red Guard Soviet Regiment of the Red Army. That month he was sent to instructor courses in Yaroslavl, and after graduation remained at the courses to retrain officers of the imperial army. With the courses, he took part in the suppression of the Yaroslavl rebellion from 6 to 21 July 1918, and in the fighting with the armed bands led by Sotnikov. After the disbandment of the courses in August 1918 he was sent to the 7th Yaroslavl Regiment. In December, he went to the Northwestern Front with the regiment, where he fought as a platoon and company commander. In April 1919 he was dispatched to the Novgorod Infantry Courses for Red Commanders. During training he twice left with the courses to the Petrograd front, where he took part in the battles with the Northwestern Army in the areas of Strelna, Ligovo, Gatchina, Pulkovo, and Yamburg. After graduating from the courses in October 1919 he went to the Southern Front with the 7th Yaroslavl Regiment, where he fought against the Army of Wrangel as commander of a platoon and company of cadets. In battle near Tokmak he was captured by the Whites. He spent 23 days in captivity before escaping. From July 1920 he fought as a company and battalion commander with the 337th Rifle Regiment of the 42nd Rifle Division. He took part in the battles against the Dashnaks in the Transcaucasus between September and November 1920, and against the Makhnovites in Ukraine. That year in battle near Andreyevka he was captured by the Makhnovites, escaping two days later.

From March 1921, Korotkov commanded a company of the 126th Regiment of the Reserve of Command Personnel in Mozdok. After the disbandment of the regiment he was sent to serve in the same position in the 21st Rifle Regiment of the 20th Rifle Division at Prokhladnaya.

== Interwar period ==
After the war, in November 1921, Korotkov was sent to study at the Kiev Combined Higher Military School. After graduating in August 1923, he continued serving at the 5th Kiev Infantry School as a platoon commander, assistant company commander, chief of the machine gun detachment and acting commander of a student company. In December 1926, having completed machine gun courses, he was appointed assistant battalion commander in the 21st Rifle Regiment of the 7th Chernigov Rifle Division of the Ukrainian Military District in Romny. In January 1929, he was sent to the Central Asian Military District as a battalion commander of the 7th Turkestan Mountain Rifle Regiment of the 3rd Turkestan Rifle Division in Chardzhou. In November 1931 he was transferred to Termez to become chief of the regimental school of the 15th Mountain Rifle Regiment. From December 1931 he served in the 3rd Mountain Rifle Regiment of the 1st Turkestan Mountain Rifle Division in Ashkhabad as chief of ammunition supply of the regiment, and from April 1933 as regimental chief of staff. From February to June 1936, he studied at the Vystrel courses. From July 1937 he served at the district headquarters as chief of the training section of the Reserve Command Personnel Improvement Courses of the district and assistant chief of the 2nd staff department. From October 1938 to May 1939 he completed Command Personnel Improvement Courses at the General Staff Academy. On graduation he was appointed commander of the 150th Mountain Rifle Regiment of the 83rd Mountain Rifle Division (the renamed 1st Turkestan) of the Central Asian Military District. From May 1940, then-Colonel Korotkov served as deputy commander of the 194th Rifle Division, and in March 1941 was appointed commander of the 238th Rifle Division.

== World War II ==
After the German invasion of the Soviet Union, Korotkov continued to command the division. At the end of August the division was relocated from Ashkhabad to the Tula area and as part of the 49th Army of the Western Front fought in defensive battles with superior German forces. In December during the counteroffensive near Moscow the division in conjunction with other units of the army advanced towards Kondrovo and Maloyaroslavets, advancing up to 60 km into the rear of the German defenses and liberating Aleksin. From May 1942 Korotkov served as chief of staff of the 49th Army, and from 10 June took command of the 5th Guards Rifle Corps. His units as part of the 16th Army of the Western Front fought sustained defensive battles on the Zhizdra river southwest of Sukhinichi. Exhausting the German troops and inflicting significant losses, the corps went over to the offensive, forced the Zhizdra river and captured a bridgehead on the west bank. Subsequently, Major General Korotkov directed the operations of the corps to hold the bridgehead until the approach of other army units.

From 14 October 1942 Korotkov commanded the 53rd Army, which as part of the Northwestern Front fought against the German 16th Army, holding the Demyansk bridgehead. From 30 January 1943 he took command of the 1st Shock Army and led it in the Demyansk offensive. On 26 February the army attacked and in conjunction with the 27th Army of the front by the end of 28 February reached the Lovat river, eliminating the Demyansk bridgehead. From 1 April 1944 he commanded the 22nd Army, which as part of the 2nd Baltic Front took part in the Leningrad-Novgorod, Madona, and Riga offensives. The units of the army successfully fulfilled the task to destroy the German troops and liberated a number of areas in the Baltic, including Dno on 24 February 1944, Idritsa on 12 July, Daugavpils on 27 July, Rezekne on 27 July and Riga on 30 October. From October 1944 to April 1945 under the command of Korotkov the army together with other forces blockaded the Courland Pocket.

== Postwar ==
After the end of the war, Korotkov continued to command the army in the Southern Group of Forces until its disbandment in September 1945, then was placed at the disposal of the Main Personnel Directorate. From November he commanded the 27th Guards Rifle Corps of the Central Group of Forces, and in January 1946 it was transferred to the Kiev Military District. From February 1947 he commanded the 25th Army of the Primorsky Military District in North Korea. In April 1948 he was sent to the Higher Academic Courses at the Voroshilov Higher Military Academy. After completing the courses in May 1949 he was appointed chief of staff and first deputy commander of the Voronezh Military District. From February 1955 he served as deputy head military advisor and senior advisor to the chief of the General Staff of the Czechoslovak People's Army. From July to November 1958 he was at the disposal of the commander-in-chief of the Ground Forces, and on 5 November 1958 retired. Korotkov died on 23 November 1982 in Voronezh.

== Decorations ==
Korotkov received the following decorations:

- Order of Lenin (2)
- Order of the Red Banner (3)
- Order of Kutuzov, 1st class (2)
- Medals
- Foreign orders and medals
