= Moscovia (region) =

Historical region in Central Russia

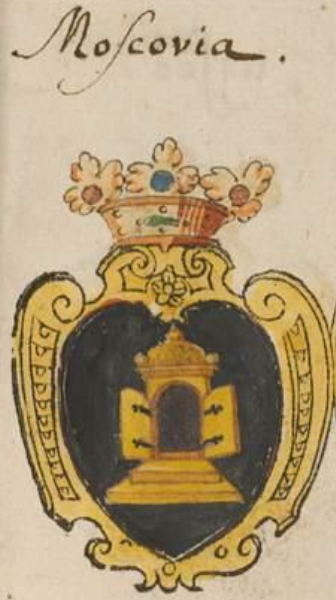
Coat of arms of Muscovy from the German book "Großes Wappenbuch, enthaltend die Wappen..." ("Big Book of Coat of Arms..."), 1583—1700

Moscovia or Muscovy (Russian: Моско́вия, romanized: Moskoviya) is a historical region in Central Russia. The name derived from Moscow and the Moskva river. It was known to its neighbors through the Moscovian state that emerged in the 13th century. Finno-Ugric tribes like the Meshchera people and Slavic tribes such as the Vyatichs lived in the Moscow area. The culture of Moscovia and surrounding lands arose from the Russian people, their lands and rivers such as the Tarusa and Ruza.

== Name ==
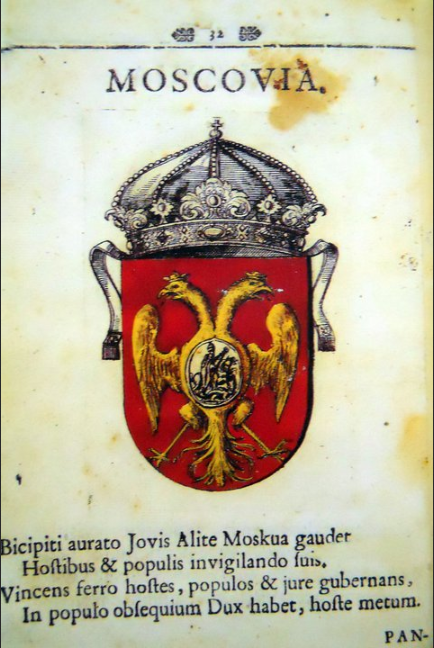
Coat of arms of Moscovia, "Stemmatografia", 1702

Moscovia was the political and geographical name of the Russian state and the Tsardom of Russia in some foreign sources, used with varying degrees of priority in parallel with the ethnographic name Russia (Russian: Руссия, romanized: Russiya) from the 15th to the beginning of the 18th century. Initially, it was the Latin name of Moscow (for comparison: Latin: Varsovia, Kiovia) and the Grand Duchy of Moscow. Later in Western and Central Europe it was transferred to the Tsardom of Russia, formed around Moscow under Ivan III. Various researchers believe that its use was facilitated by Polish–Lithuanian Commonwealth propaganda, which explicitly retained the terminology of feudal fragmentation, denying the legitimacy of the struggle of Ivan III and his successors for the reunification of the Rus' lands. The Latinate Moscovia was not used, entering the Russian language no earlier than the 18th century as an incompletely mastered borrowing.

== Cartography ==
Coexistence of the names Russia and Moscovia on geographical maps of the 16th–17th centuries

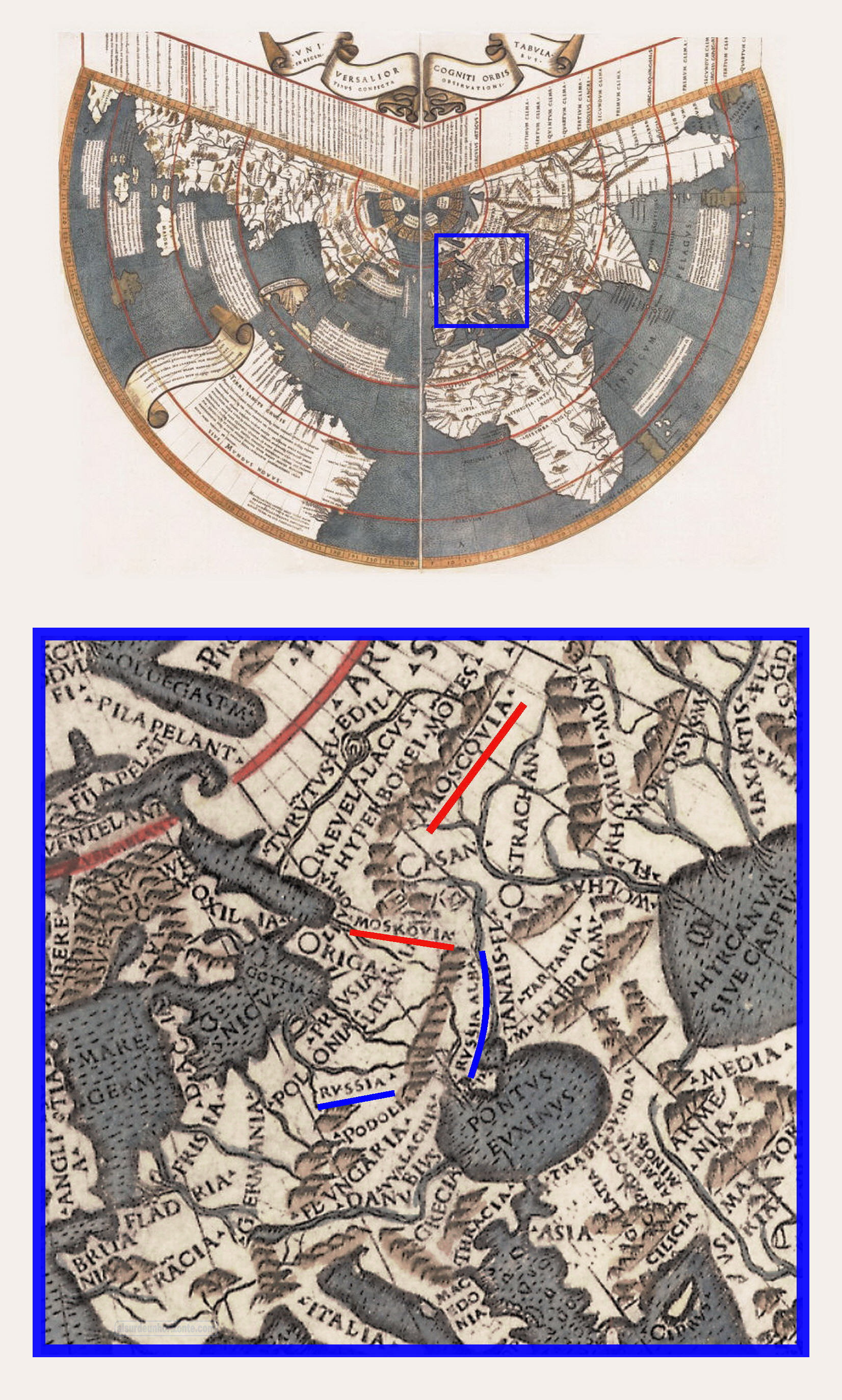
Russia and Moscovia 1507 Planisphere by Johannes Ruysch

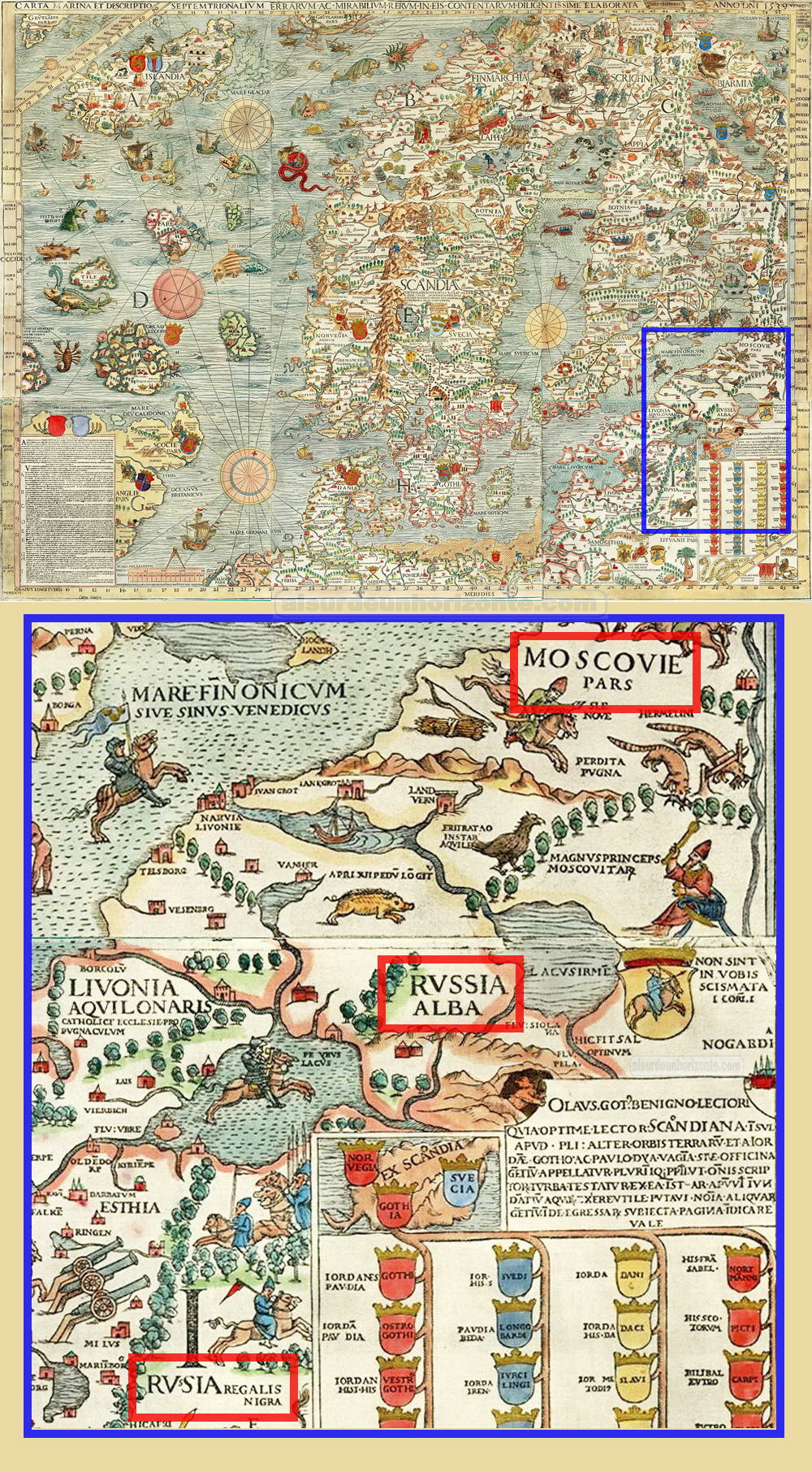
1539 Carta marina Olaus Magnus

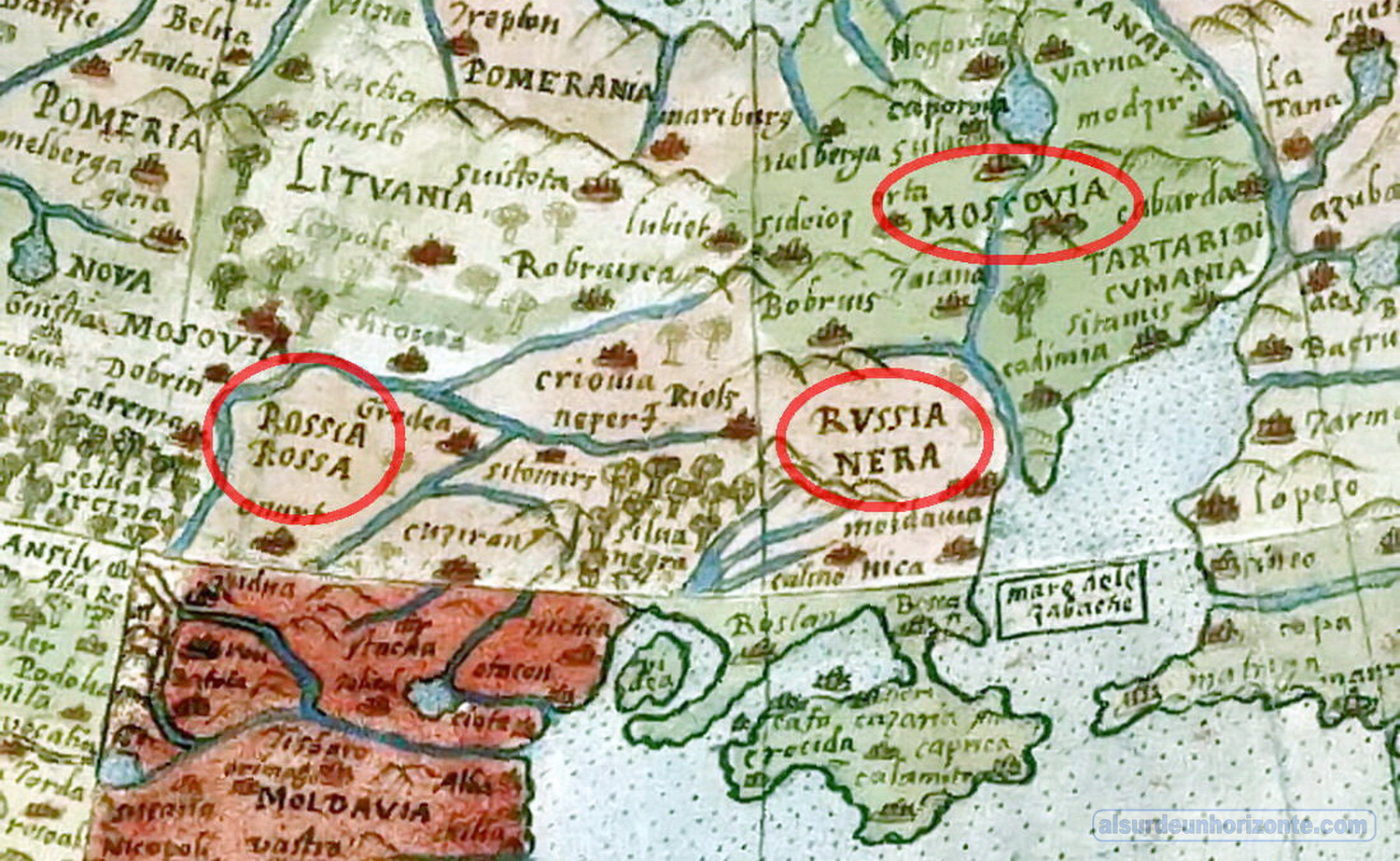
Moscovia, Russia on territory of modern-day Ukraine. 1587 Planisphere Urbano Monti

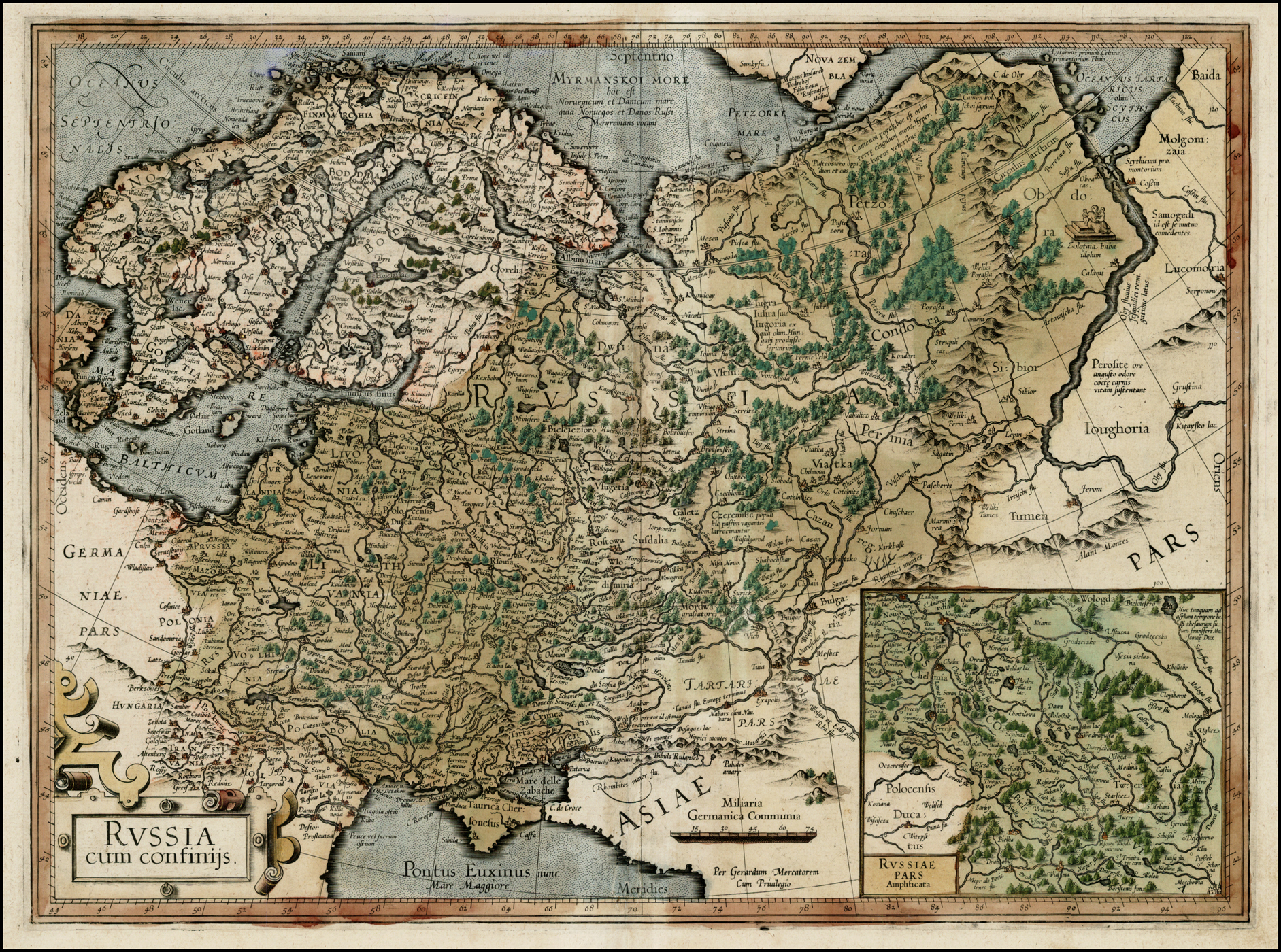
Usage example Russia, Gerardus Mercator, 1595. Moscovia is designated as one of its localities.

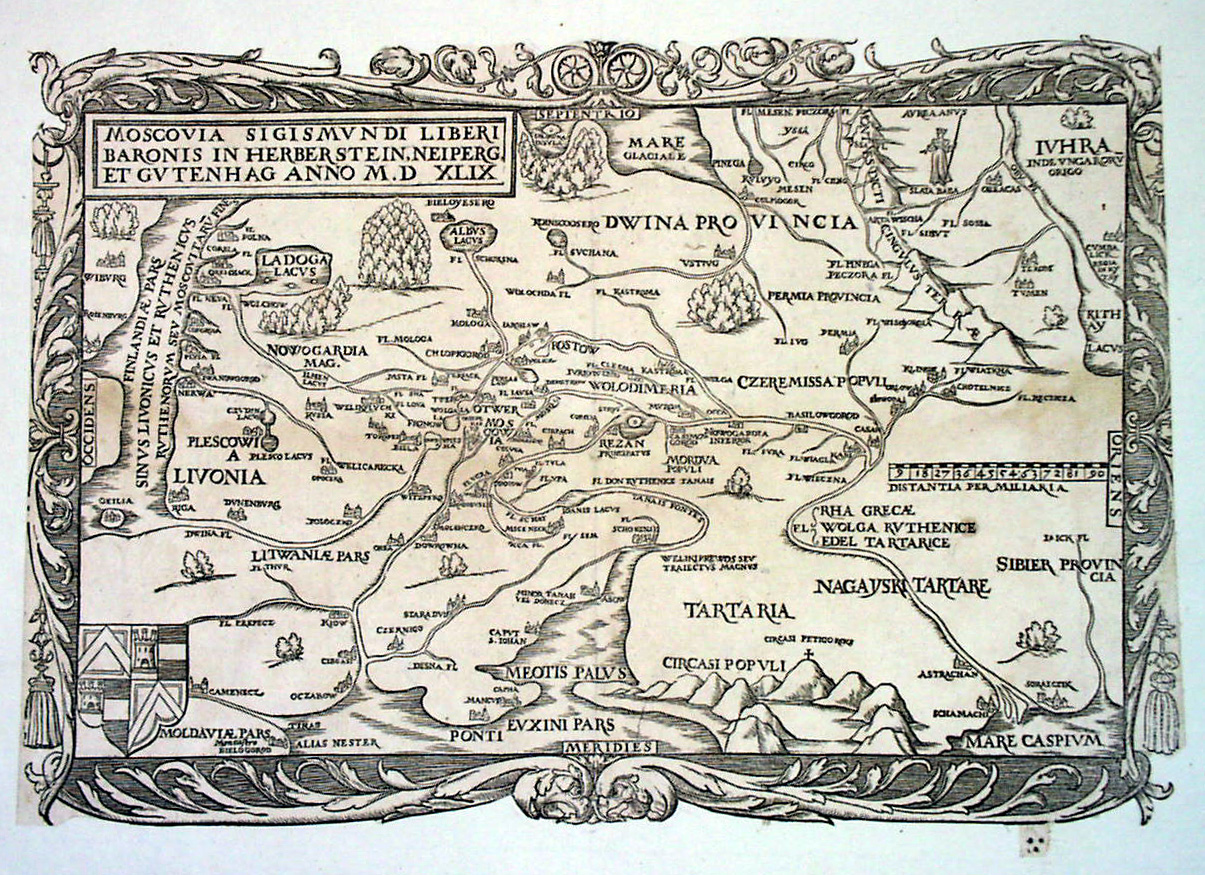
An example of using Moscovia, Sigismund von Herberstein, 1549. The coast of the Baltic Sea is called the Livonian-Ruthenian coast (Sinus livonicus et ruthenicus), as well as the edge of Ruthenians or Muscovites (Ruthenorum seu Moscovitarum fine).

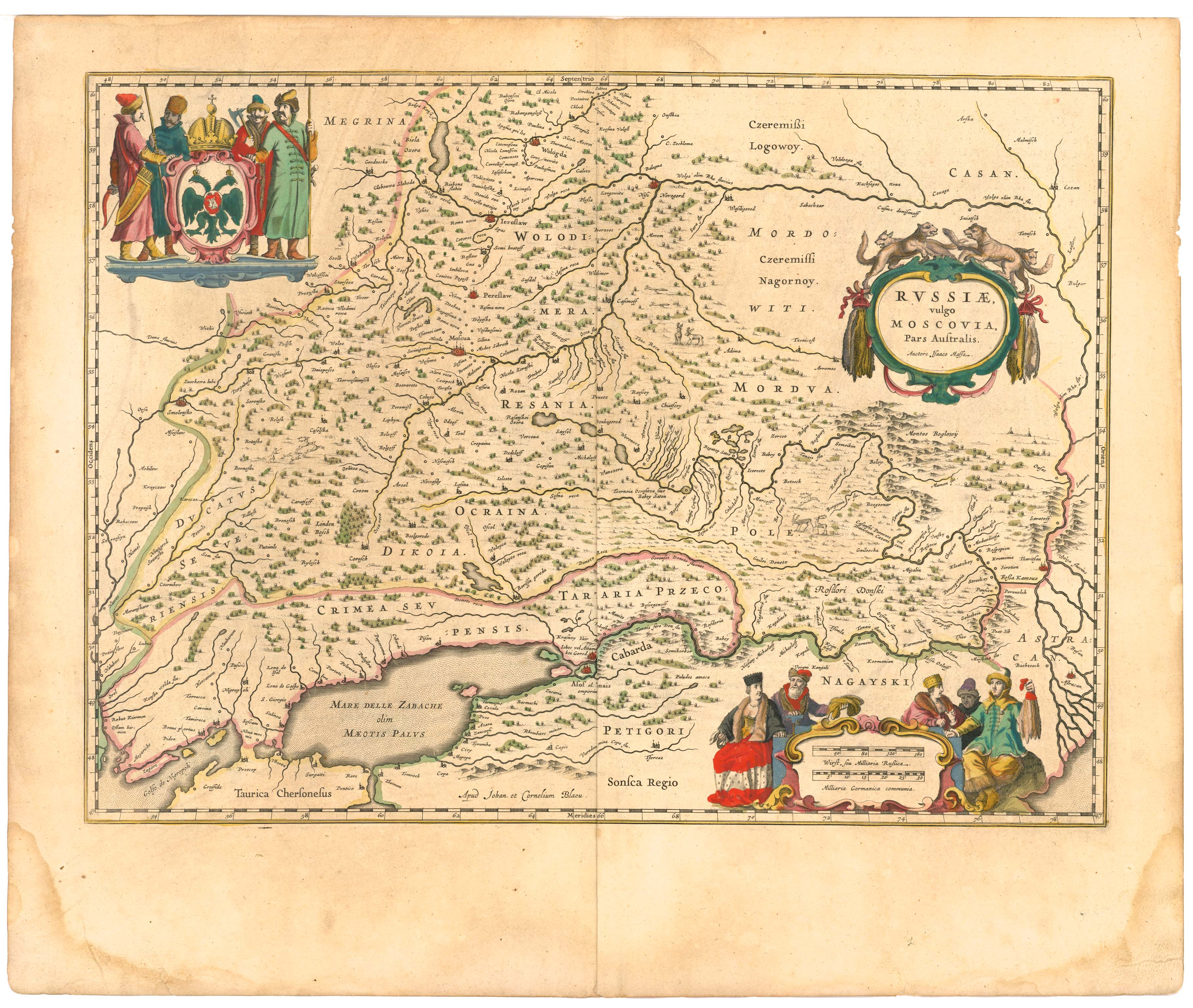
Shared usage example: Russia, colloquially Moscovia, Atlas Maior, Dutch Republic, 1645.

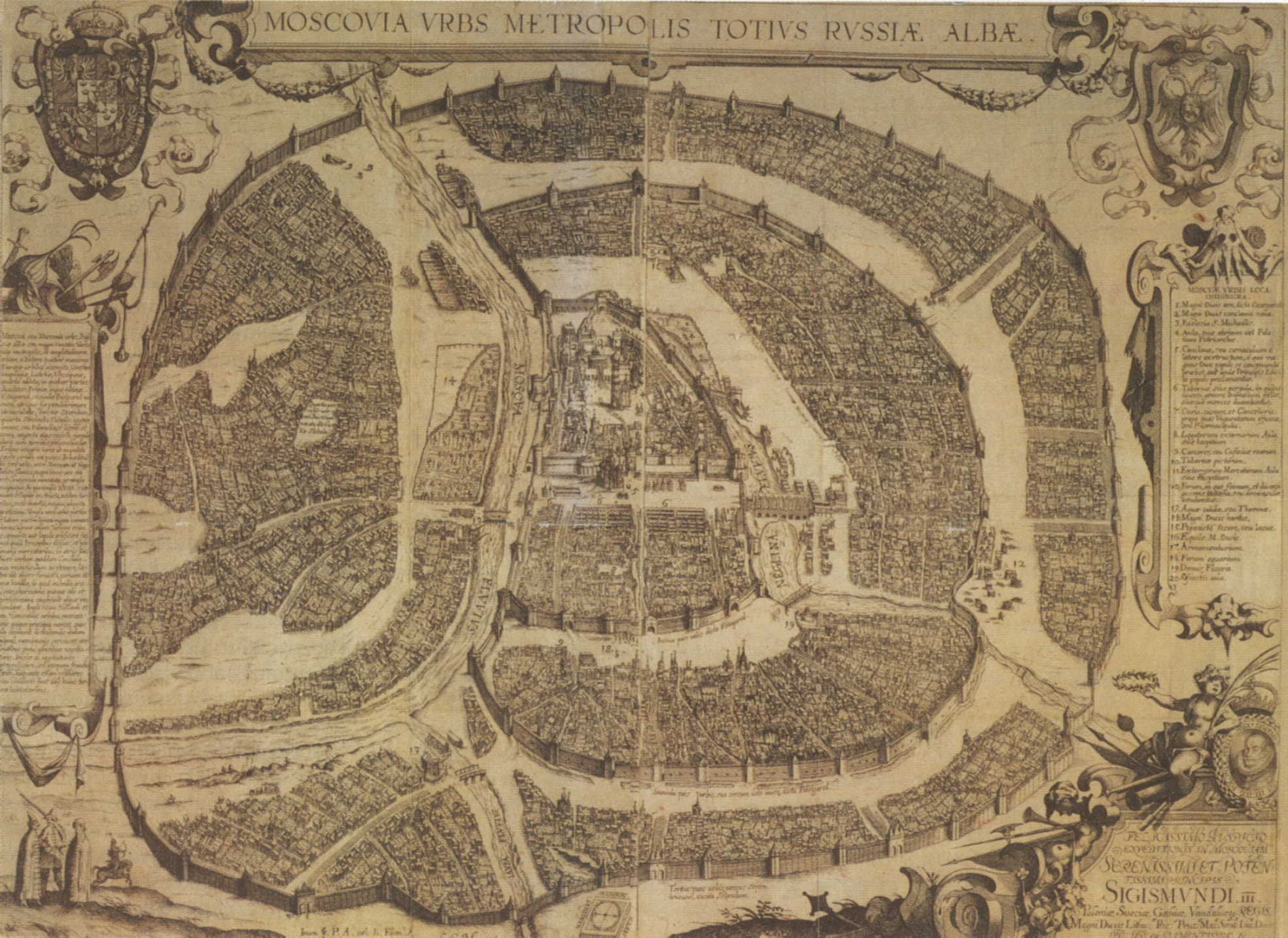
An example of using Moscovia as the name of a city – the capital of White Russia (Russia Alba). Sigismund's plan of Moscow, 1610.

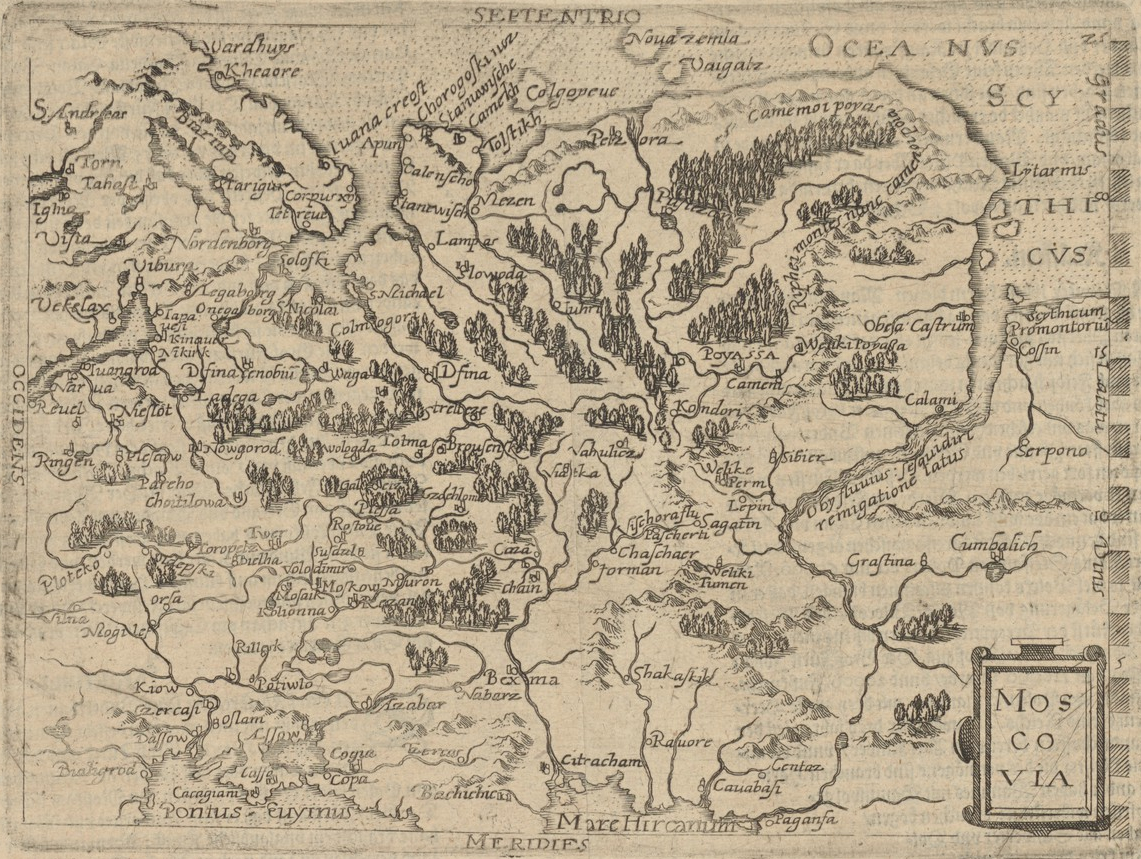
1596, Lambert Andrea, Moscovia

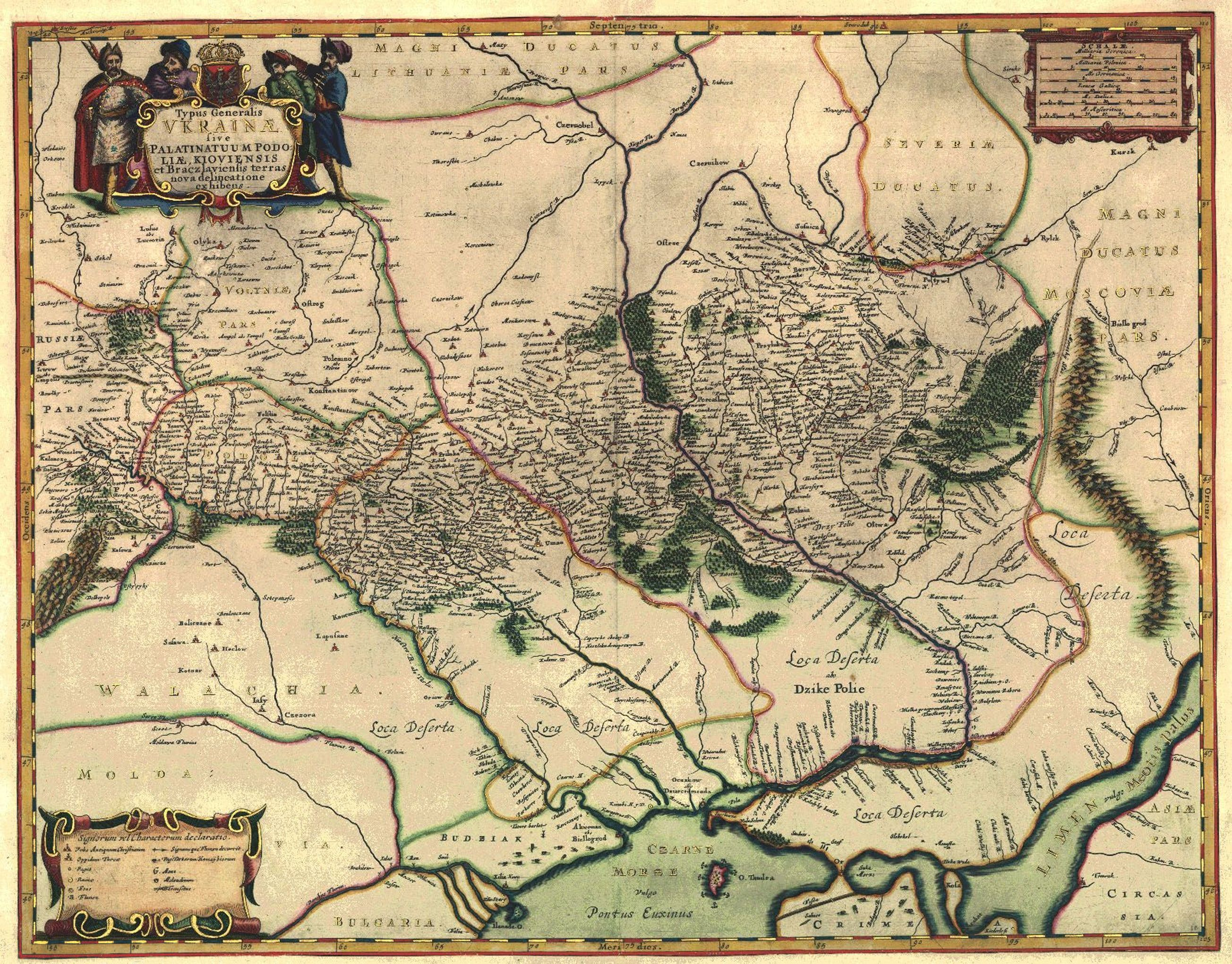
1648, Jan Janssonius, Typus Generalis Vkraine (General Description of Ukraine), in the east Moscovia Pars (Land of Moscovia).

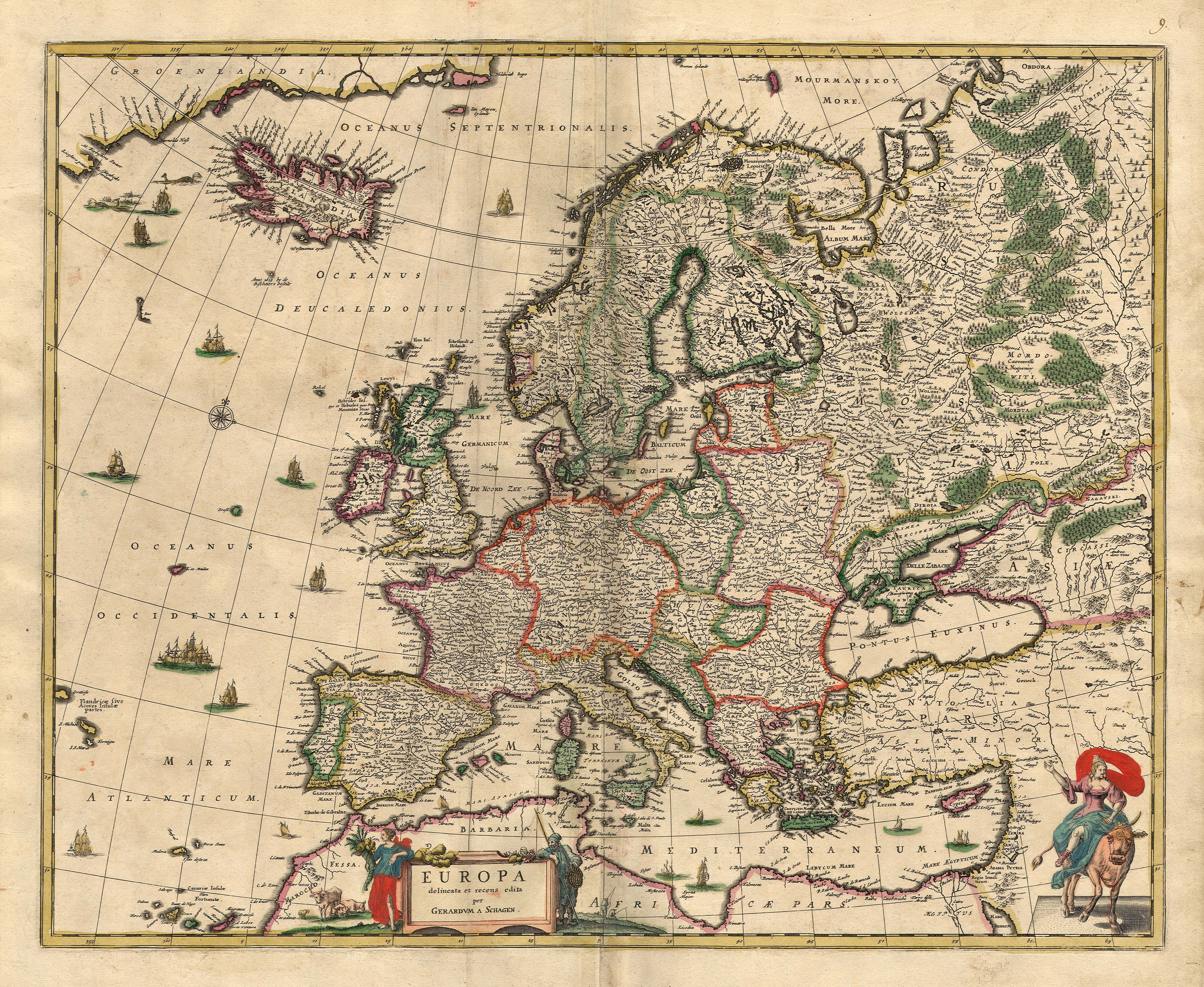
1689, Guillaume Sanson, Moscovia on the map of Europe after the betrayal by the Moscow leadership of the Pereiaslav Agreement signed by Bohdan Khmelnytsky.

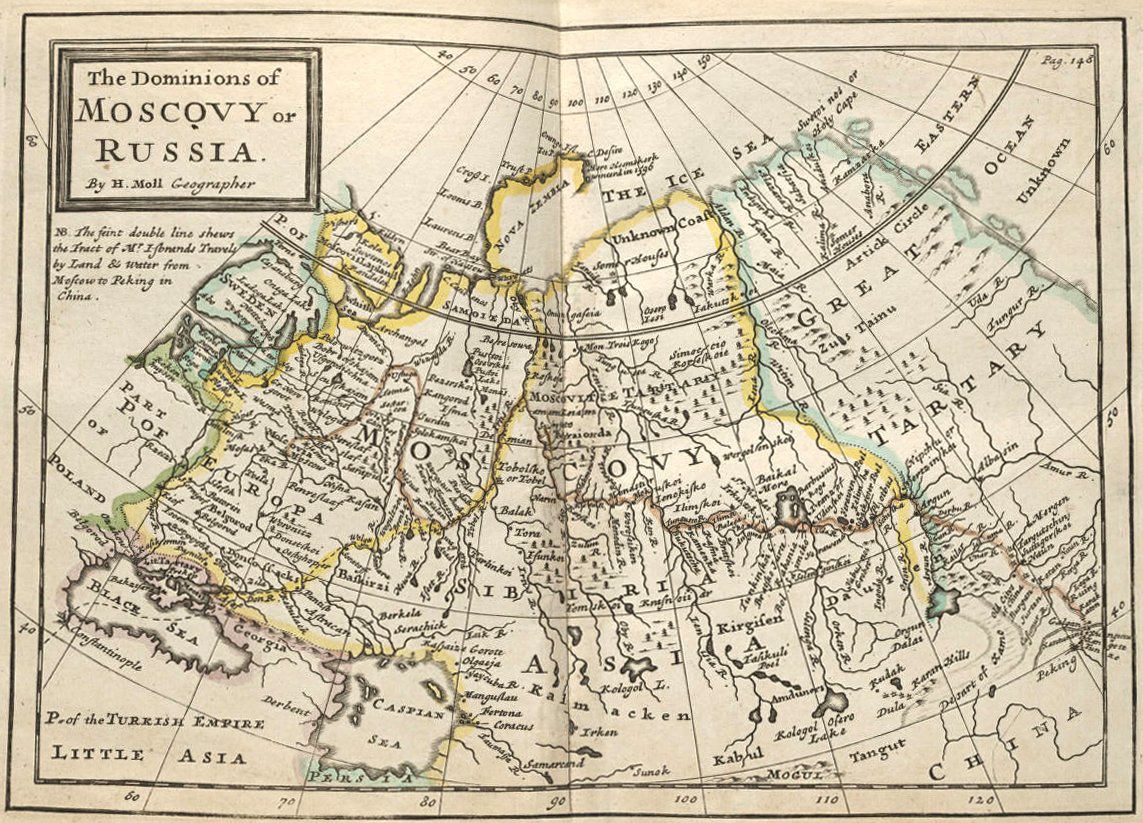
"The Possession of Moscovia or Russia." Map from Herman Moll's collection "Twenty four new and accurate maps of the several parts of Europe". London, 1715?

== See also ==
- Moskal
