= 53rd Army (Soviet Union) =

- 53-я армия
- Active: 1941–1945
- Country: Soviet Union
- Branch: Red Army
- Size: Field army
- Part of: Central Asian Military District Northwestern Front; Steppe Front; 2nd Ukrainian Front Transbaikal Front
- Engagements: Demyansk Pocket Battle of Kursk; Battle of Belgorod; Battle of the Dnieper; Battle of the Korsun-Cherkassy Pocket; Uman–Botoșani Offensive; Second Jassy–Kishinev Offensive; Battle of Debrecen; Budapest Offensive; Prague Offensive Soviet invasion of Manchuria

Commanders
- Notable commanders: See list

The 53rd Army (Russian: 53-я армия) was a field army of the Soviet Union's Red Army which was formed in August 1941, disbanded in December 1941, and reformed in May 1942. It fought throughout World War II before again being disbanded after the war in October 1945. The army was first formed for the Anglo-Soviet invasion of Iran and was disbanded there in December 1941. The army reformed in May 1942. It fought in the Demyansk Pocket, the Battle of Kursk, the Battle of Belgorod, the Battle of the Dnieper, the Battle of the Korsun–Cherkassy Pocket, the Uman–Botoșani Offensive, the Second Jassy–Kishinev Offensive, the Battle of Debrecen, the Budapest Offensive, and the Prague Offensive. At the end of the war in Europe it was moved to the Far East and fought in the Soviet invasion of Manchuria. The army was disbanded in October 1945.

== History ==
=== First formation ===
The 53rd Army was created by a Stavka directive on August 23, 1941. Its immediate task was to occupy Iran in conjunction with the British Army and other Commonwealth armed forces in August and September 1941. The purpose was to secure Iranian oil fields as well as safeguard the shipment of Lend-Lease war material from the US through Iran to the USSR. Units of the 53rd Army crossed the border on August 27, overcame resistance from Iranian border guards, and advanced towards Mashad.

As part of the Central Asian Military District, 53rd Army was described by the Combat composition of the Soviet Army as including 58th Rifle Corps (68th and 83rd Mountain Rifle Divisions, 389th Rifle Division), 4th Cavalry Corps (18th, 20th, 39th Cavalry Divisions), 44th Cavalry Division, and 72nd Independent Mountain Rifle Regiment (огсп) on 1 October 1941.

The 53rd Army was disbanded in December 1941.

=== Second formation ===
The 53rd Army was reformed on May 1, 1942 from divisions of the 34th Army with the mission of fighting on the Northwestern Front. Until March 1943 it fought the German 16th Army in the Demyansk Offensive and unsuccessfully attempted to cut the Ramushevo corridor. After the German breakout the 53rd Army was transferred to the Stavka reserve on March 22 and then to the Reserve Front on April 10. On April 15, it was transferred a third time, to the Steppe Front, where it received new units and fought in the Battle of Kursk. On July 16 its troops took defensive positions on a line from Podolhi to Poidjarug. It fought subsequently in the Battle of Belgorod, pushing back German troops from July 19 onwards.

In August and September 1943 the Army fought in the Belgorod-Kharkov Offensive and the capture of eastern Ukraine. Units of the 53rd Army advanced more than 200 km and in cooperation with other armies captured Kharkov on August 23 and Poltava a month later. On October 5 it reached the Dnieper. The 53rd Army forced the Dnieper, captured a bridgehead southeast of Kremenchug, and fought hard until mid-November to retain its foothold on the right bank.

The Army was transferred to the 2nd Ukrainian Front on October 20 and attacked along the Kirovohrad axis. By December 24 it had reached the line of Krasnosele and Znamianka, where it was stopped by German reserves. On January 5, 1944 the attack was resumed and the defending German units were destroyed. At the end of January the 53rd Army fought in the Korsun-Shevchenkovsky Offensive and attacked in the direction of Zlatopol. In the Uman–Botoșani Offensive it captured Balta on March 29, Kotovsk three days later and, at the end of the offensive, a bridgehead on the Dniester near Dubăsari.

Then it fought in the Second Jassy–Kishinev Offensive, attacking along the Focșani axis, and entered Bucharest on August 31. On 31 August 1944, the deposed Romanian autocrat Ion Antonescu, then a captive following the 1944 Romanian coup d'état, was taken to the headquarters of the 53rd Army.

At the end of September 1944, the 53rd was on the Hungarian border northeast of Arad. In October it fought in the Battle of Debrecen, during which Army commander German Tarasov was killed on 19 October. In cooperation with the 1st Guards Mechanized Cavalry Group, it broke through German defenses and advanced 100 kilometers to the Tisza near Polgár. Between November 7 and 10, 1944, the 53rd Army forced the Tisza during the Budapest Offensive north of Abádszalók. In conjunction with the 110th Guards Rifle Division and 3rd Guards Airborne Division of the 27th Army it captured Eger on November 30. The 53rd Army then attacked along the Lučenec axis, reached the Hron at the end of February 1945, and then went on the defensive.

During the Bratislava-Brno Operation the 53rd Army crossed the Hron on March 25 and captured Vráble on March 28, Nitra on March 30, Hlohovec on April 1, and Hodonín on April 13. Brno was captured on April 26 in cooperation with the 6th Guards Tank Army and 1st Guards Cavalry Mechanized Group. In the last days before the German surrender the 53rd Army fought in the Prague Offensive.

From June to July 1945 it was deployed in Mongolia near Choibalsan, and at the beginning of August the 53rd Army was transferred to the Transbaikal Front. It fought in the Manchurian Strategic Offensive Operation and was disbanded in October 1945.

== Composition ==
The 53rd Army was composed of the following units:

=== 1941 ===
- 68th Mountain Rifle Division
- 39th Cavalry Division
- 83rd Mountain Rifle Division
- 4th Cavalry Corps
  - 18th Mountain Cavalry Division
  - 20th Mountain Cavalry Division
- 238th Rifle Division
- 9th Rocket Mortar Battalion
- 72nd Separate Mountain Rifle Regiment

=== 1 May 1942 ===
- 22nd Guards Rifle Division
- 23rd Rifle Division
- 130th Rifle Division
- 166th Rifle Division
- 235th Rifle Division
- 241st Rifle Division
- 250th Rifle Division

=== 1 July 1943 ===
- 28th Guards Rifle Division
- 84th Rifle Division
- 116th Rifle Division
- 214th Rifle Division
- 233rd Rifle Division
- 252nd Rifle Division
- 299th Rifle Division

=== August 1945 ===
- 18th Guards Rifle Corps
- 49th Rifle Corps
- 57th Rifle Corps

== Commanders ==
The 53rd Army was commanded by the following officers:

- Major General Sergei Trofimenko (1941)
- Major General Alexander Ksenofontov (April–October 1942)
- Major General Gennady Korotkov (October 1942 – January 1943)
- Major General Yevgeny Zhuravlev (January–March 1943)
- Lieutenant General Ivan Managarov (March–December 1943)
- Major General German Tarasov (December 1943 – January 1944)
- Lieutenant General Ivan Galanin (January–March 1944)
- Lieutenant General (promoted to Colonel General) Ivan Managarov (March 1944 – 1945)
