= Belgorod–Bogodukhov offensive operation =

Belgorod-Bogodukhov offensive operation
- Part of the Eastern Front of World War II
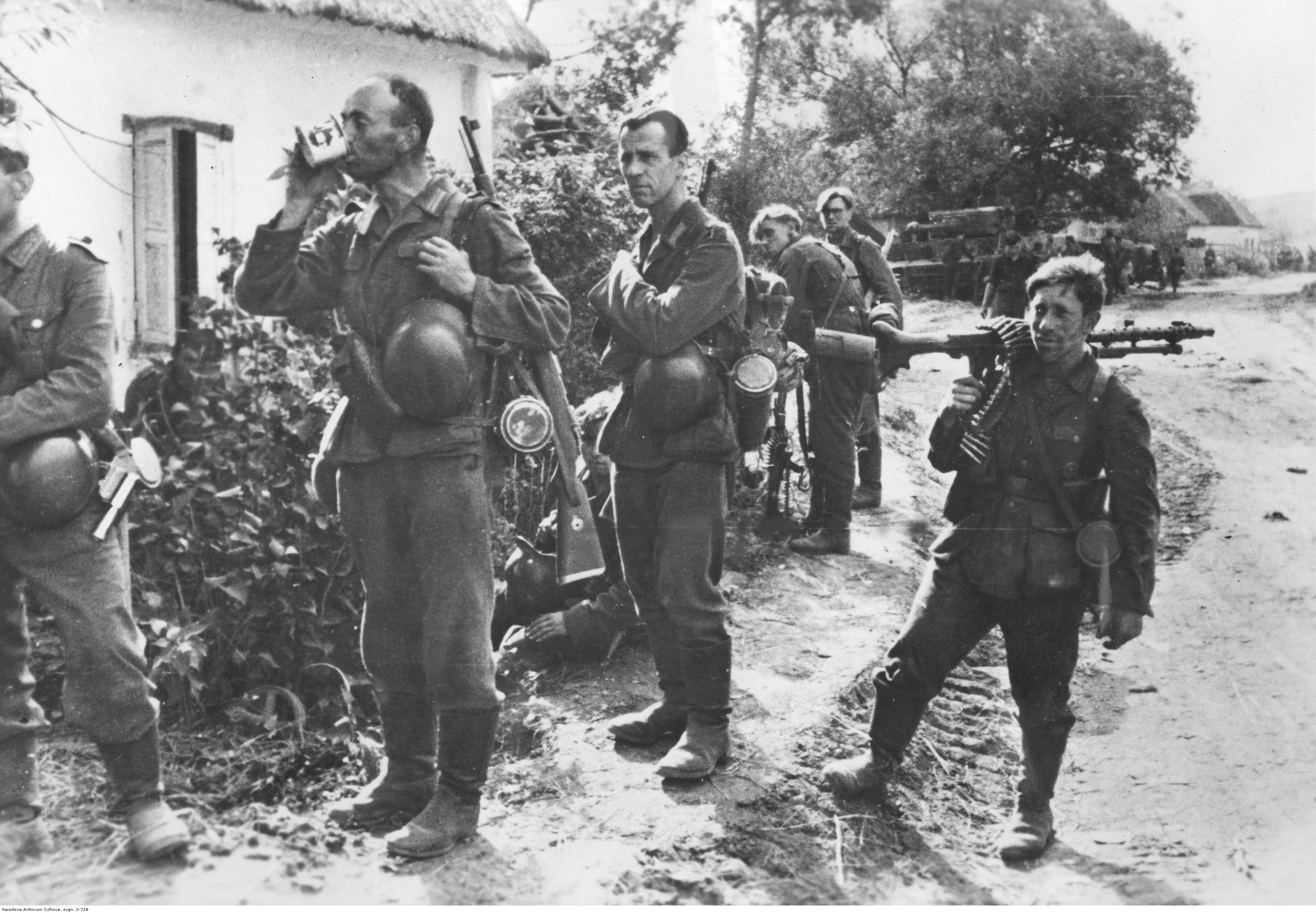
- German soldiers rest in a village near Belgorod, August 1943
Date	3 August 1943 – 23 August 1943
Location	Belgorod
Result	Soviet victory

Belligerents
Germany	Soviet Union

Commanders and leaders
Erich von Manstein	Nikolai Vatutin; Ivan Konev

Units involved
4th Panzer Army; Army Group "Kempf"; XLVIII Panzer Corps; III Panzer Corps; XI Army Corps; Großdeutschland Panzergrenadier Division	Voronezh Front; Steppe Front; 1st Guards Tank Army; 5th Guards Tank Army; 6th Guards Army; 5th Guards Army; 53rd Army; 69th Army; 7th Guards Army; 27th Army

Casualties and losses
Unknown	

The Belgorod–Bogodukhov offensive operation (3 August 1943 – 23 August 1943) was a combat operation executed as part of Operation Polkovodets Rumyantsev by the Red Army against the Wehrmacht forces. It was one of the operations that was launched in response to the German offensive Operation Citadel.

== Prelude ==
During the Battle of Kursk, German armored units south of the Kursk salient failed to penetrate the defences between the Voronezh and Steppe Fronts in the Belgorod sector. The Red Army's Operation Polkovodets Rumyantsev followed Operation Citadel and included as its objectives the immediate liberation of Belgorod, assigned to the Voronezh and Steppe Fronts. On July 23, German forces of the XI Army Corps returned to their old, well fortified positions on both sides of Belgorod. Their combat strength had been reduced by as much as 50% following the battle.^{a}

== Offensive operation ==
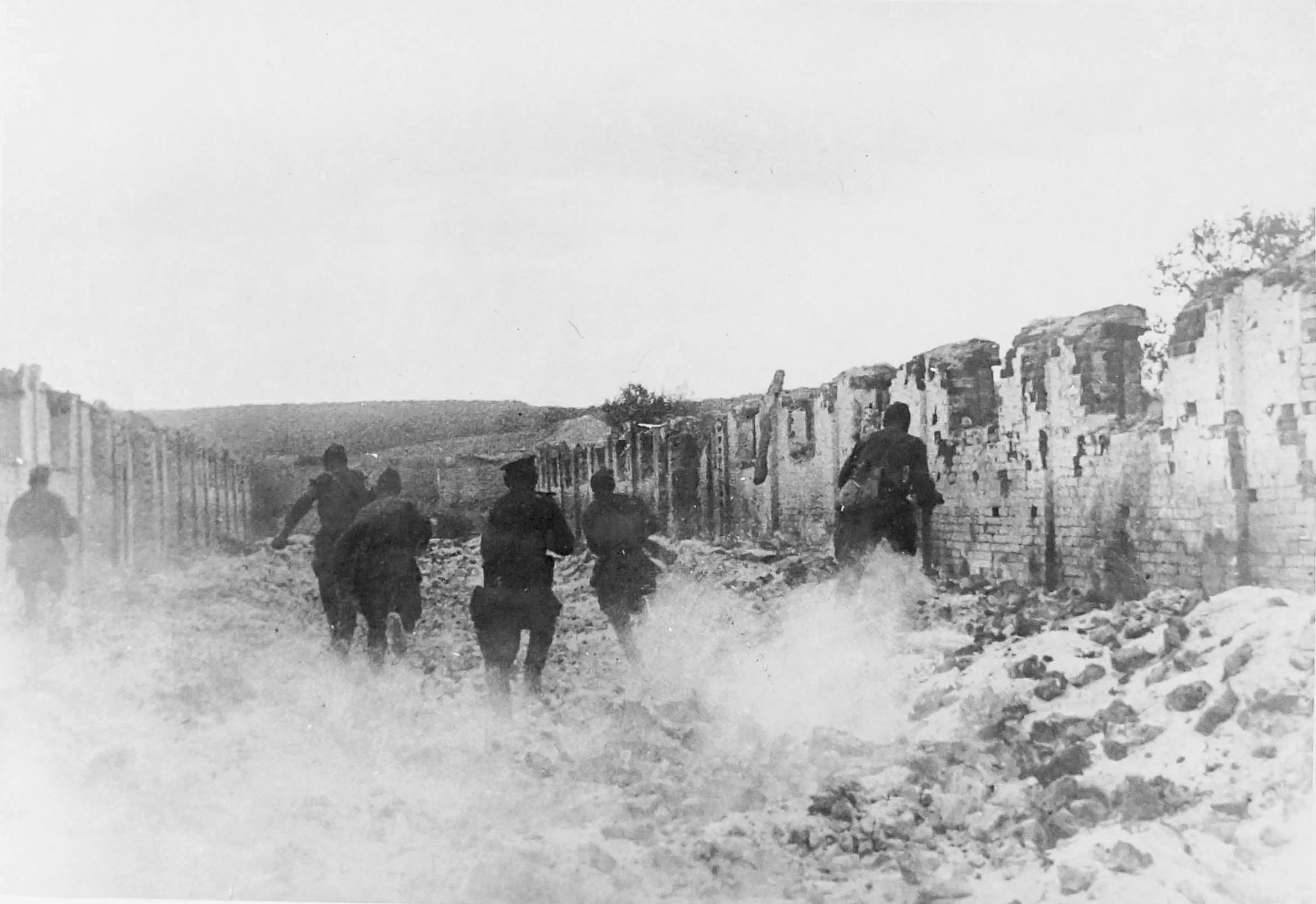
Soviet submachine gunners driving Germans out of a fortified settlement, Belgorod axis

Early on 3 August 1943, the forces of the Voronezh and Steppe Fronts,^{b} advancing on a wide front between Sumy and former Volchansk (175 km), crossed the Vorskla river and quickly penetrated the defences of the 332nd Infantry Division and 167th Infantry Division to a depth of 100 km between Tomarovka and Belgorod on the northern flank, and as far as Bogodukhov sweeping aside the weakened 19th Panzer Division. By 5 August, Belgorod which was defended by XI Armeekorps (Raus) was also being surrounded and isolated, requiring attempts by the German Armeeabteilung Kempf and 4th Panzerarmee Armies to relieve the garrison which was ordered by Hitler to defend the city. General Raus explains:

On 5 August after Soviet artillery had fired heavily for one hour, the enemy offensive began along the Belgorod–Kursk highway, with the aim of pushing through the salient around Belgorod where the boundary between the Fourth Panzer Army and Armeeabteilung Kempf was situated and thereby dislocate the entire defensive line. In this the Russians succeeded completely. Their heavy barrage hit the 167th Infantry Division, which had taken up positions in a former Soviet antitank ditch, located a few kilometres in front of the well-fortified line. Within a short time massed Red Army tanks had crossed this ditch; by noon they passed the corps command post and poured into the depth of the German positions, all the while firing on our fleeing trains. On the following morning [6 August], after a nighttime forced march, Russian spearheads had reached the surprised headquarters of the Fourth Panzer Army at Bogodukhov. Since Colonel General Hermann Hoth's army had no reserves available to close the ten-kilometre gap in his front between Tomarovka and Belgorod, or even to stop the flood of enemy tanks that had already broken through to a depth of 100 kilometres, Russian spearheads reached the area northeast of Poltava and Akhtyrka on 7 August. [These and other events illustrate] the dangerous situation into which this development thrust XI Corps which had been fighting with its front to the east.

On the very first day of the Soviet offensive, XI Corps had been attacked in the rear by enemy tank forces situated thirty kilometres in the depth of our positions. These tank forces simultaneously exerted crushing pressure on our unprotected left flank. At this critical moment, XI Corps had not only been left to its own devices but also had been handicapped by a direct Fuehrer Order, which had arrived at the last minute and insisted that Belgorod was to be held under all circumstances.

The corps front now formed a deep salient into enemy territory, which might have disintegrated with complete encirclement as its final destiny. This would have meant a widening of the existing Belgorod–Tomarovka gap from twenty-fve to eighty kilometres and the immediate loss of several divisions...

With these considerations I decided—Hitler's order notwithstanding—to fight a delaying action in successive positions until the withdrawal reached Kharkov and then hold the city.

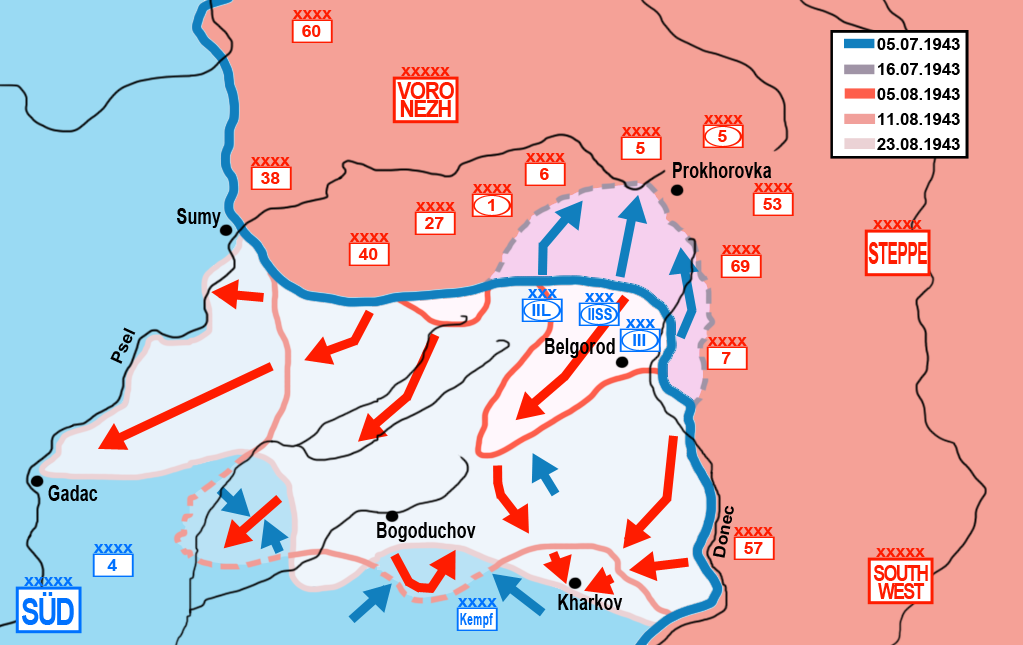
Location of Belgorod

While the German intention was to "pinch off" the Red Army's offensive thrust at the base of the penetration between Borisovka and Grayvoron south of Vorskla river, the rapid tempo of the Steppe and Voronezh Fronts offensive meant that by the time the counter-attacks were executed the city had been evacuated on 6 August, and German forces were now defending Kharkov. The Wehrmacht's Mobile Forces were heading into an encounter with the main thrust of the Soviet Front tank armies. The German counter-attacks were carried out by the III Panzercorps of the Armeeabteilung "Kempf" in the Olshany area, and the XLVIII Panzercorps of the 4th Panzerarmee in the two-pincer manoeuvre of the Krasnokutsk and Akhtyrka areas. In the fighting that took place on both sides of the Merla and Merchik rivers, the superiority of the German Panzer Divisions was clearly evident, in spite of being involved in combat operations continuously since 5 July. Whilst 5th SS Panzer Division 'Wiking' and 3rd Panzer Division conducted primarily defensive operations, 2nd SS Panzer Division 'Das Reich', 3rd SS Panzer Division 'Totenkopf' repeatedly blunted attacks of Soviet elements south of the rivers and Bogodukhov. As at Prokhorovka, the Russians enjoyed tremendous numerical superiority in tanks. Both 1st Tank Army and 5th Guards Tank Army began the operations with over 500 tanks each, while the SS divisions never had more than about 30-50 tanks each at any time during August. In spite of this, all Soviet attempts to penetrate to the railroad line were repulsed with bloody losses in men and tremendous loss in tanks. Katukov's 1st Tank Army thrusts south of the Merchik were repeatedly cut off and destroyed by III Panzercorps. The attempts by Rotmistrov's 5th Guards Tank Army to penetrate to the rail line from east of Bogodukhov were frustrated by 3rd Panzer Division and 'Wiking', with key defensive fighting by elements of 'Das Reich'. 'Totenkopf' executed a masterful attack that cut off elements of infantry and armour from the 27th Army and 6th Guards Army south of Krasnokutsk and then rolled down the line of supply toward Kolomak, south of Konstantinovka. Subsequent attacks encircled disorganized elements of several Russian Divisions and destroyed major portions of them after brief fighting. Subsequently, 'Totenkopf' drove to the Merla and forced a crossing of that river and linked up with 4th Panzerarmee spearheads at Parchomovka. However, Großdeutschland was forced to withdraw from that town by Soviet pressure on its Northern flank, and this success could not be followed up.

== Aftermath ==
After Belgorod was retaken on 6 August 1943 by the 69th and 7th Guards Armies of the Steppe Front^{c} the way was clear to concentrate forces for the Soviet offensive on Kharkov.

== Footnotes ==
- ^a XI. Armeekorps suffered the following casualties during the Battle of Kursk. 106th Infantry Division - 3,244 (forty-six officers), 320th Infantry Division - 2,839 (thirty officers) and 168th Infantry Division - 2,671 (127 officers) a total of 8,754 combat effective soldiers.
- ^b Consisting of the 1st Guards Tank Army, 5th Guards Tank Army, 6th Guards Army, 5th Guards Army, 40th Army, 69th Army, 7th Guards Army, 27th Army
- ^c by the German 168th Infantry Division
