= Vasily Yushkevich =

Soviet colonel general (1897–1951)

Vasily Alexandrovich Yushkevich
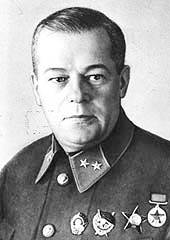
- Yushkevich in 1942
- Born: 28 February [O.S. 16 February] 1897; Vilna, Russian Empire
- Died: 15 March 1951 (aged 54) Moscow, Soviet Union
- Buried: Novodevichy Cemetery
- Allegiance: Russian Empire; Russian SFSR; Soviet Union
- Branch: Imperial Russian Army; Red Army (later Soviet Army)
- Service years: 1915–1917; 1919–1938; 1939–1950
- Rank: Colonel general
- Commands: 100th Rifle Division; 13th Rifle Corps; 44th Rifle Corps; 22nd Army; 31st Army; 3rd Shock Army; Odessa Military District; Volga Military District
- Conflicts: World War I; Russian Civil War; Spanish Civil War; World War II
- Awards: Order of Lenin (2); Order of the Red Banner (4); Order of Suvorov, 1st class; Order of Kutuzov, 1st class; Order of the Red Star; Order of Saint Stanislaus, 3rd class

Vasily Alexandrovich Yushkevich (Russian: Василий Александрович Юшкевич; 28 February [O.S. 16 February] 1897 – 15 March 1951) was a Soviet Army colonel general.

Conscripted into the Imperial Russian Army during World War I, Yushkevich rose from private to second lieutenant during the war. Drafted into the Red Army during the Russian Civil War, he served as a battalion and regimental commander. Yushkevich held regimental commands in the 1920s and division and corps commands in the 1930s before a stint as an advisor in the Spanish Civil War. He was arrested after returning from Spain due to the Great Purge, but reinstated in 1939. At the outbreak of Operation Barbarossa he commanded the 44th Rifle Corps in Belarus. Yushkevich subsequently commanded the 22nd and 31st Armies in the Battle of Moscow and the Battles of Rzhev, and the 3rd Shock Army in the Baltic Offensive. He was relieved of command in August 1944 due to illness and became commander of the rear-area Odessa Military District. Postwar, he commanded the Volga Military District before retiring in 1950.

== Early life, World War I, and the Russian Civil War ==
Yushkevich was born on 28 February 1897 in Vilna, the son of a postman. After graduating from a six-grade commercial school, he was drafted into the Imperial Russian Army during World War I in March 1915 and became a junker at the Vilna Military School. At the school, he was promoted to unter-ofitser in July and in September graduated from an accelerated 4-month first level training course with the rank of praporshchik. Yushkevich was sent to the Southwestern Front, where he served as a junior officer and then temporary company commander of the 7th Marching Reserve Battalion of the 3rd Marching Reserve Brigade.

In March, 1916 he was placed at the disposal of the chief of staff of the 7th Army Corps of the 11th Army and seconded to the headquarters of the 34th Infantry Division until July, before being appointed a junior officer in a company of the 133rd Simferopol Infantry Regiment, serving as a platoon leader. Between July and August, he fought in battles on the Seret River and was wounded, but remained at the front. For distinguishing himself, Yushkevich was promoted to podporuchik in September and in October was awarded the Order of Saint Stanislaus, 3rd class with swords and knot. He became a company commander of the regiment in August 1917.

Yushkevich was drafted into the Red Army in February 1919 during the Russian Civil War. He fought against the Armed Forces of South Russia and the forces of Nykyfor Hryhoriv. In April 1920, he was appointed commander of the 2nd Separate Guard Battalion in Katerynoslav, and in June became head of a special purpose detachment. From September 1920, Yushkevich served with the 3rd Rifle Division as acting commander of the 25th Rifle Regiment, commander of the divisional separate reserve battalion, and commander of the 25th Rifle Regiment. He led the regiment in fighting against the Army of Wrangel on the Southern Front. From May 1921, he was head of the flying expeditionary detachment of the division, fighting against the remnants of the Revolutionary Insurgent Army of Ukraine.

== Interwar period ==
After the end of the war, Yushkevich continued to serve with the 3rd Rifle Division as assistant commander of the 8th Brigade and later commander of the 21st Rifle Regiment of the 7th Brigade. He commanded the 9th Rifle Regiment from December 1921. After completing the Higher Commanders' Improvement Courses (KUVNAS) at the Frunze Military Academy in June 1926, Yushkevich was appointed commander of the 113th Rifle Regiment of the 45th Rifle Division of the Ukrainian Military District. He transferred to become assistant commander of the 7th Rifle Division of the same district and graduated from KUVNAS at the Frunze Academy again later that year. Yushkevich taught at the N.G. Tolmachev Military-Political Academy from October 1929.

Serving as commander and commissar of the 100th Rifle Division from November 1930, Yushkevich was given the rank of komdiv in 1935 when the Red Army introduced personal military ranks. After becoming commander and commissar of the 13th Rifle Corps in November 1936, he was sent to serve as an advisor to the Spanish Republican Army during the Spanish Civil War, participating in operations on the Jarama and in Zaragoza, Huesca, and near Madrid. He was awarded the Order of Lenin for his actions, but upon his return from Spain was arrested by the NKVD on 8 August 1938 and imprisoned during the Great Purge. Yushkevich was reinstated in the Red Army on 29 November 1939 and placed at the disposal of the Red Army Personnel Directorate. Appointed inspector of the 1st Department of the Directorate of the Chief of Infantry of the Red Army in June 1940, he became head of the 1st Department of the Combat Training Directorate of the Red Army in August. Yushkevich became commander of the 44th Rifle Corps of the Western Special Military District in March 1941.

== World War II ==
After the beginning of Operation Barbarossa, the German invasion of the Soviet Union, Yushkevich led the corps in defensive battles as part of the 13th Army of the Western Front, utilizing the fortifications of the Minsk Fortified Region during the Battle of Białystok–Minsk. In July, the corps fought in the Battle of Smolensk as part of the 19th Army, temporarily recapturing Yartsevo, for which Yushkevich was given the rank of major general on 7 August. From August, he commanded the 22nd Army of the front, fighting in defensive battles in the Toropets sector. In October, he was appointed commander of the 31st Army of the Kalinin Front, which fought in the defense of Kalinin and the Kalinin Offensive during the Battle of Moscow. In the Kalinin Offensive, the army and the 29th Army recaptured Kalinin. Yushkevich led the army in the Rzhev–Vyazma Offensive, between January and March 1942, and returned to command of the 22nd Army in April 1942, participating in the advance of the front troops in the direction of Rzhev and Vyazma. He was promoted to lieutenant general on 21 March 1942.

Yushkevich led the army in the Rzhev–Vyazma Offensive in March 1943 and from April in defensive battles along the eastern bank of the Lovat River in the sectors of Kholm and Velikiye Luki as part of the Northwestern Front (then the Baltic from 13 October and 2nd Baltic from 20 October). The army fought in the Leningrad–Novgorod Offensive during January and February 1944, advancing towards Idritsa. Yushkevich was transferred to command the 3rd Shock Army of the front in April, participating in the Rezhitsa–Dvinsk Offensive, Madona Offensive, and Riga Offensive. In August, due to illness, he was dismissed from command and soon appointed commander of the Odessa Military District.

== Postwar ==
After the end of the war, Yushkevich, promoted to colonel general on 11 July 1945, continued in command of the Odessa Military District until July 1946, when he transferred to command the Volga Military District. In April 1950, he was relieved of his post and placed at the disposal of the Soviet Minister of Defense, being retired later that year. He died on 15 March 1951 and was buried at the Novodevichy Cemetery.

== Awards and honors ==
Yushkevich received the following decorations:

- Order of Lenin (2)
- Order of the Red Banner (4)
- Order of Suvorov, 1st class
- Order of Kutuzov, 1st class
- Order of the Red Star
- Order of Saint Stanislaus, 3rd class (not worn after 1917)
