= 68th Mountain Rifle Division =

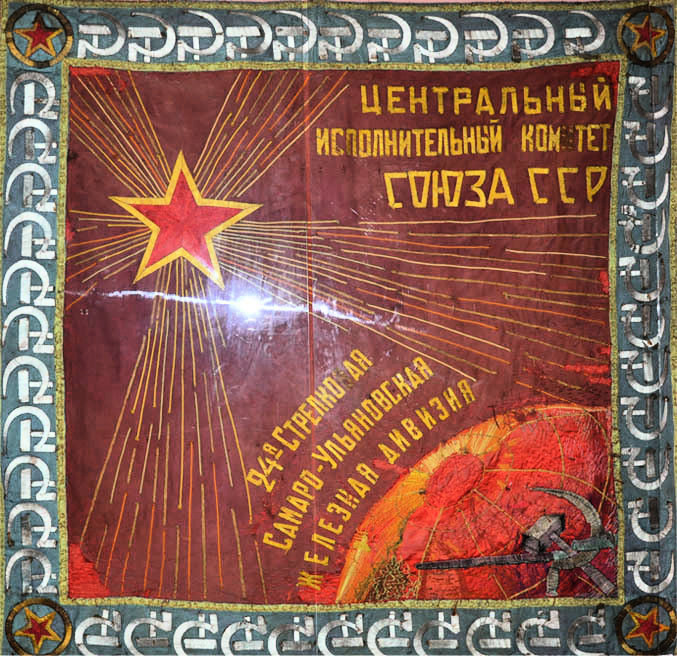
- Late 1920s battle flag of the type issued to the division with unit designation to the left of the globe
- Active: 1919–1946 (68th Mountain Rifle Division from 1936)
- Country: Russian SFSR; Soviet Union
- Branch: Red Army
- Type: Mountain infantry (from 1929), previously infantry
- Engagements: Russian Civil War; Basmachi revolt; Anglo-Soviet invasion of Iran
- Decorations: Honorary Revolutionary Red Banner
- Honorifics: named for the Central Executive Committee of the Tajik ASSR (removed)

The 68th Mountain Rifle Division (Russian: 68-я горнострелковая дивизия) was a mountain infantry division of the Red Army before and during World War II.

Formed in late 1919 during the Russian Civil War as the 3rd Turkestan Rifle Division, it served with the Turkestan Front in the defeat of White Cossack forces for the next several months. The division began participating in the suppression of the Basmachi movement in late 1920, and was briefly renumbered as the 2nd Turkestan Rifle Division between 1921 and 1922. The division was stationed in the Dushanbe area from 1923 and eliminated the last remnants of the Basmachi in that area within a year. It was awarded the Honorary Revolutionary Red Banner in 1928 and converted to a mountain division a year later before being redesignated as the 3rd Turkestan Mountain Rifle Division.

It became the 68th Mountain Rifle Division in 1936. The division fought in the Anglo-Soviet invasion of Iran in August and September 1941 and remained in Iran for the rest of World War II as part of the Soviet occupation force in the northern part of the country. It was disbanded postwar in 1946 when Soviet troops withdrew from northern Iran.

== History ==
=== Russian Civil War ===
The division began its existence during the Russian Civil War when all Red Army forces operating on the Semirechye Front were consolidated into the Separate Semirechye Detachment by an order of the Turkestan Front on 22 November 1919. The detachment was reorganized into the 3rd Turkestan Rifle Division at Verniy by an order of 20 December. Ivan Belov commanded the division from mid-January. As part of the 1st Army of the Turkestan Front, the division fought in Semirechye Oblast against White Cossack forces led by Ataman Alexander Dutov (the Orenburg Independent Army) and remnants of the Siberian Army between January and March 1920. In April it fought against the Semirechye Cossacks led by Ataman Boris Annenkov in the battles for Lepsinsk, capturing Semirechye from the Whites. The military council of the division was established on 29 May with the status of an army-level command. In mid-June elements of the division participated in the brief revolt of the Verny garrison, although at this point most of the division was on the Semirechye front. Belov and division commissar Dmitry Furmanov stalled for time by granting the demands of the rebels before the arrival of loyal troops, which ended the revolt. Belov was promoted to higher command and replaced by Iosif Blazhevich on 7 July. After the defeat of the White Cossacks, the headquarters of the 59th Rifle Division, which served as the headquarters for the Semipalatinsk Group of Forces of the 5th Army, was merged into the headquarters of the 3rd Turkestan Rifle Division on 28 July. The three brigades of the group, one from the 35th Rifle Division and two from the 59th Rifle Division, joined the division.

From December the 3rd Turkestan Rifle Division fought to suppress the Basmachi movement in Fergana Oblast, after being transferred to the Fergana Army Group of the front in October. When Blazhevich was promoted to army command, Vasily Klementyev became division commander on 22 November, but only commanded it for little more than a month. D. E. Konovalov commanded the division for the first four months of 1921, and was replaced by Georgy Zinoviev. With its transfer from Semirechye to Fergana, the division headquarters served as the headquarters for the Fergana Army Group until the latter was abolished in September 1921. During this period, as a result of a reorganization of Soviet troops in Turkestan, the headquarters of the division was renumbered as the headquarters of the 2nd Turkestan Rifle Division on 4 May 1921, and its troops were used to rebuild the latter. On 18 September, the headquarters of the Fergana Group was redesignated the staff of troops in Fergana Oblast, the command of the troops was assigned to the commander of the 2nd Division, and he was subordinated to the local Soviet authorities. The 3rd Turkestan Rifle Division was reformed from the 2nd on 12 July 1922, and was assigned to the 13th Rifle Corps when the latter was formed in October of that year. The division moved to the Dushanbe area to suppress Basmachi there between 1923 and 1924, as the movement was eliminated.

=== Interwar period ===
With its corps, the 3rd Turkestan became part of the Central Asian Military District in June 1926 when the latter replaced the Turkestan Front following the elimination of the Basmachi. The division was named in honor of the Central Executive Committee of the Tajik Autonomous Soviet Socialist Republic on 29 April 1927, and in 1928 was awarded the Honorary Revolutionary Red Banner. The division was reorganized as a mountain rifle division on 1 October 1929 and its redesignation as the 3rd Turkestan Mountain Rifle Division followed on 13 February 1930. The division participated in the suppression of a renewed outbreak of the Basmachi movement in Tajikistan and Uzbekistan between April and June 1931.

By 1935, the division and its 14th Turkestan Mountain Rifle Regiment were headquartered at Termez, Uzbekistan, while the 9th and 13th Regiments were at Chardzhou and Kerki in Turkmenistan, respectively. When the Red Army standardized its numbering system, the division was redesignated as the 68th Central Executive Committee of the Tajik Autonomous Soviet Socialist Republic Turkestan Red Banner Mountain Rifle Division on 21 May 1936. At the end of March 1940 the division, still headquartered at Termez, became part of the 58th Rifle Corps when the corps headquarters transferred to the Central Asian Military District. The naming in honor of the Central Executive Committee of the Tajik ASSR was removed from its designation on 16 July of that year and the division became simply the 68th Turkestan Red Banner Mountain Rifle Division.

=== World War II and postwar ===
For the Anglo-Soviet invasion of Iran the 68th and its corps were assigned to the 53rd Army, formed to control the Central Asian Military District units participating in the operation; the 39th Mountain Cavalry Division of the corps also participated in the invasion. After crossing the Iranian border on 26 August, the division occupied Gorgan, Sari, Shahi, and Babol. By the end of the invasion the headquarters and divisional troops of the 68th were at Sari, the 230th Mountain Rifle Regiment at Babol, the 430th Mountain Rifle Regiment at Gorgan, and the 182nd and 313th Mountain Rifle Regiments and 139th Artillery Regiment in Tehran. The three regiments in Tehran were withdrawn to Shahi in November, although the first echelon of the 182nd returned to Tehran in the second half of 1942.

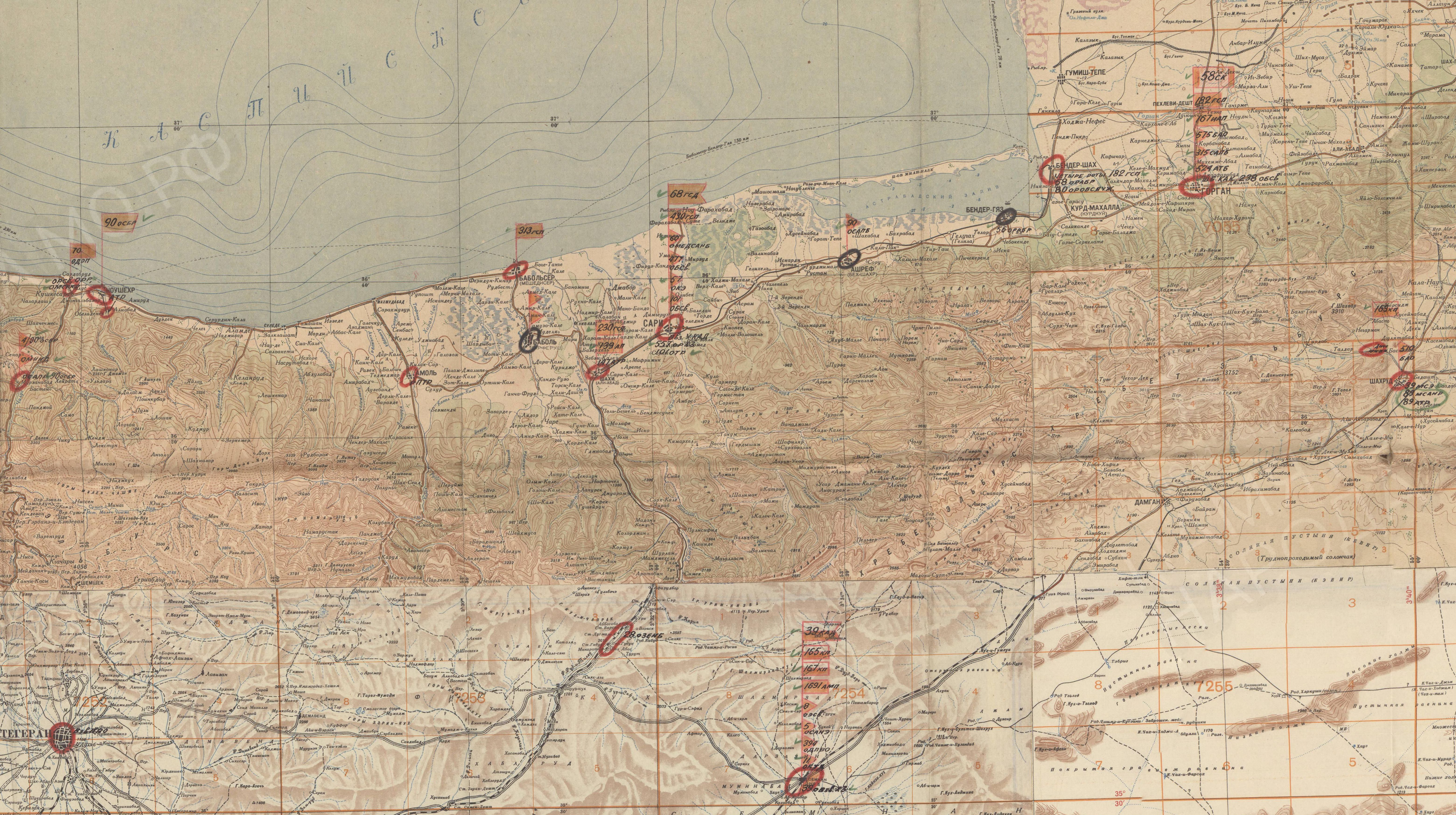
Positions of the division on 15 March 1944

The division remained with the 58th Rifle Corps as part of the Soviet occupation force in northern Iran. Colonel Taras Korneyev became division commander in October 1943 and was promoted to major general a month later; he commanded the division until July 1945. With the corps, the 68th became part of the 4th Army when the latter was formed in January 1944 to provide a higher headquarters for Soviet troops in Iran. In March of that year the 28th Separate Light Anti-Aircraft Artillery Battery at Qazvin joined the division. The elements of the division were based near Tehran, Shahi, Sari, and Gorgan, guarding the Trans-Iranian Railway (part of the Persian Corridor) and cargo at its terminus, Bandar Shah on the southern coast of the Caspian Sea. The division was withdrawn to Makhachkala in Dagestan with the corps between March and May 1946 as Soviet forces pulled out of Iran. It was progressively disbanded along with the corps between May and July 1946; the process concluded by August.
