= 22nd Army (Soviet Union) =

WW2 Red Army formation

- 22-я армия
- Active: 1941–1945
- Country: Soviet Union
- Type: Combined arms
- Size: Field army
- HQ: Velikiye Luki
- Wars: World War 2: Eastern Front

Commanders
- Notable commanders: Filipp Yershakov; Vasily Yushkevich; Gennady Korotkov

The 22nd Army (Russian: 22-я армия) was a field army of the Red Army during World War II.

The 22nd Army was formed in June 1941 after the German invasion of the Soviet Union and served through World War II until its disbandment in 1945.

== World War II ==
Originally, it was formed in June 1941 within the Red Army and it comprised 51st Rifle Corps (98th, 112th, and 153rd Rifle Divisions) and 62nd Rifle Corps (170th, 174th, and 186th Rifle Divisions), and several separate regiments, including the 336th and 545th Corps Artillery Regiments. Headquarters was at Velikiye Luki by 22 June 1941, and General Lieutenant Filipp Yershakov took command (who would direct the army until August 1941). Lenski notes that it was then made part of the 'Group of armies of the Reserve of the Main Command'.

During the Battle of Smolensk (1941), six rifle divisions of the army fought fiercely against what victory.mil.ru describes as sixteen Wehrmacht divisions, including three tank and three motorized, and under their assault 22nd Army was forced to retreat. On July 16, 1941, the Germans managed to surround the 51st Rifle Corps, and on July 20, to seize Velikiye Luki. 48th Tank Division joined the Army by August 1, 1941.

As part of the Soviet Western Front, since October 17th the Kalinin Front, the Army conducted defensive operations on the Idritsa–Drissa–Vitebsk frontier, participated in the Battle of Smolensk, the Kalinin defensive operation, and the Battles of Rzhev - Operation Mars in 1942. General Major V. A. Yushkevich again took command in April 1942, after previously commanding the army in August–October 1941. 3rd Mechanised Corps under General Major M. Ye. Katukov joined the Army in September 1942 when it was formed, though it was later reassigned. 83rd Corps Artillery Regiment had joined the Army by 1 November 1942.

The Army's task as part of Operation Mars was as part of what in Soviet parlance was the 'Bely Offensive Operation in conjunction with the 39th Army. Spearheaded by the 3rd Mechanised Corps, the army was tasked to: 'advance eastward up the Luchesa River valley, pierce the German defenses, assist in the capture of Bely, and encircle German forces around Olenino in conjunction with the 39th Army.' 'Early on 25 November, 22nd Army, with over 50,000 men and 270 tanks of the 3rd Mechanised Corps, assaulted eastward up the Luchesa River valley. Attacking along a narrow corridor flanked by forests and frozen swamps, Soviet forces tore a gaping hole through German defences and drove German forces eastward up the valley. General Yushkevich's attack was spearheaded by Colonel I. V. Karpov's 238th Rifle Division and two regiments of Colonel M. F. Andryushenko's 185th Rifle Division, supported by a tank brigade of General Katukov's mechanised corps. The combined force routed a regiment of the German 86th Infantry Division and punctured the German front.'

In 1943, the Army fought as part of the North-Western Front since April 21, then from October 13 as part of the Baltic Front, which became 2nd Baltic Front on October 20, 1943. 22nd Army defended the river Lovat, and participated in operations at Kholm, Velikiye Luki, Leningrad-Novgorod, Staraya Russa–Novorzhev, and Rezhitsa–Dvina. It then took part in the Riga Offensive Operation, part of the Baltic Offensive. Since October 1944, together with the other armies of the Front it carried out the blockade of the German Army Group Courland in the Courland Pocket. One of the Army's rifle corps was the Latvian 130th Rifle Corps, which included two rifle divisions in which served a large number of Latvians in their ranks who would soon be facing their opposites in the Latvian 19th Waffen Grenadier Division of the SS.

== Postwar ==
Immediately after the war ended, its headquarters, along with the 109th Rifle Division, arrived in the South Ukraine in May 1945. In the Northern summer of 1945, together with the headquarters of the Separate Coastal Army, located in the Crimea, it was reorganised as the new but short-lived Tavria Military District.

It arrived in the Odessa/Tavria area with the 83rd Rifle Corps (47th, 119th, and 168th Rifle Divisions); the 100th Rifle Corps (28th, 37th, and 219th Rifle Divisions); and the 110th Rifle Corps (256th, 268th, and 394th Rifle Divisions; the latter was soon redesignated as the 48th Rifle Division). Seemingly all these forces, except the 48th Rifle Division, were disestablished rather quickly in 1945-46.

== Commanders ==
- Lieutenant general Filipp Yershakov (June–August 1941)
- General-Major (since March 1943 General-lieutenant) V. A. Yushkevich (August–October, 19th 1941, April–December 1942, March 1943 – April 1944; Yushkevich went on to command 31st Army, and after the war, the Odessa Military District briefly)
- Major general Vladimir Ivanovich Vostrukhov (on October, 20 1941 – March 1942)
- Major general Dmitry Seleznev (December 1942 – March 1943)
- Lieutenant general Gennady Korotkov (April 1944 – May 1945)
