= KUVNAS =

Red Army training course

The Courses of Improvement for Higher Officers of the Red Army (Russian: Курсы усовершенствования высшего начальствующего состава РККА), also translated as the Course for Perfecting Red Army Command Cadre and commonly known by their Russian acronym KUVNAS, were a training course for senior officers of the Red Army during the interwar period, located at the Frunze Military Academy. The course provided formal military education to senior officers who had not previously received it.

== History ==
The predecessor to KUVNAS was the Military-Academic Course for Higher Command Personnel, established at the Military Academy of the Red Army (later renamed the Frunze Military Academy) in accordance with an order of the Revolutionary Military Council of 8 August 1921. The course, which had a nine-month training period, was disbanded by an order of 6 June 1924, which mentioned a need to develop a new academic course for senior officers. This was necessary because the origins of the Red Army in the Russian Revolution resulted in a large number of senior officers who had no formal military education or only junior officer training in the Imperial Russian Army. This group included all senior commanders except for those military specialists who had graduated from the Imperial General Staff Academy.

The formation of the Course for the Improvement of Higher Command Personnel (KUVK) at the Military Academy of the Red Army, significantly expanded from its predecessor, was announced by an order of 12 August. The KUVK was merged with the Military-Political Academic Course (VPAK) on 11 May 1925 to become KUVNAS, which included military and political departments. A series of rapid changes followed as on 27 March 1926 the political department was split off and the course renamed the Course for the Improvement of Higher Command Personnel, but on 1 September 1928 the political course was merged again and the combined course became KUVNAS. The course was generally taught by graduates of the Imperial General Staff Academy. By 1928, 4.6% of Red Army officers had been educated at either KUVNAS or an academy.

Economic and military mobilization departments were established in 1930. The course was disbanded in 1936 as a result of the creation of the Military Academy of the General Staff, which took over its role. In addition, the course had become redundant as the younger generals had already received military education through military schools and advanced courses. A KUVNAS with a seven-month training period was later established at the Military Academy of the General Staff in late 1940.
