= Tarusa (river) =

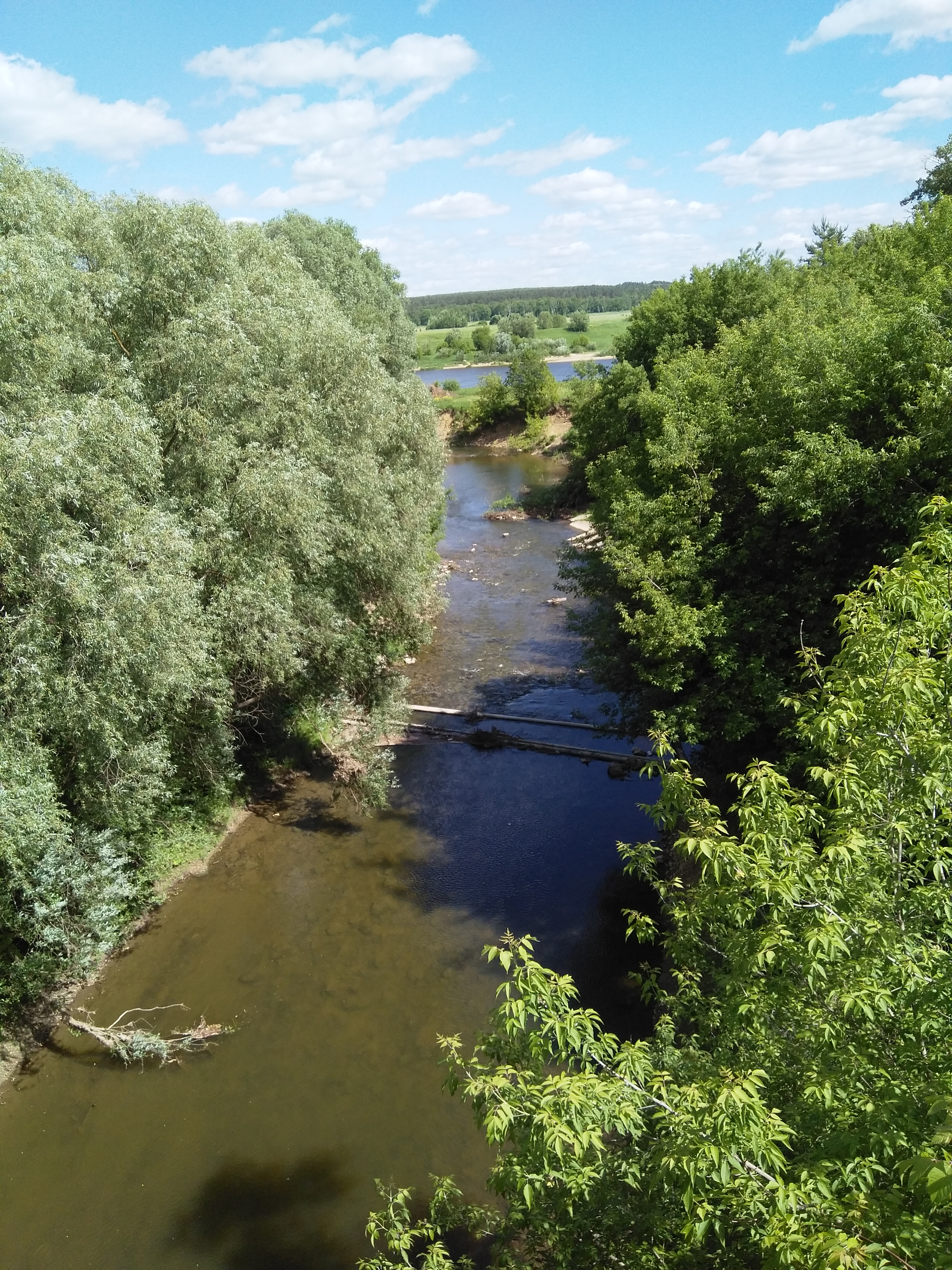
- Tarusa river
- Native name: Тару́сa (Russian)

Location
- Country: Russia

Physical characteristics
- Mouth: Oka
  - coordinates: 54°43′57″N 37°10′56″E
- Length: 88 km (55 mi)

The Tarusa (Russian: Таруса) is a river in Kaluga Oblast, western Russia.
