= Vasily Shatilov =

Soviet Army colonel general (1902–1995)

- Born: 17 February 1902; Kalmek, Voronezh Governorate, Russian Empire
- Died: 16 February 1995 (aged 92); Moscow, Russia
- Burial place: Kuntsevo Cemetery
- Military career
- Allegiance: Soviet Union (1924–1964)
- Service years: 1924–1964
- Rank: Colonel General
- Commands: 150th Rifle Division
- Conflicts: World War II
- Awards: Hero of the Soviet Union; Order of Lenin (2); Order of the Red Banner (3); Order of Kutuzov, 2nd Class (2); Order of the Patriotic War, 1st Class; Order of the October Revolution; Order of the Red Star

Vasily Mitrofanovich Shatilov (Russian: Васи́лий Митрофа́нович Шати́лов; 17 February 1902 – 16 February 1995) was a Soviet Army colonel general who commanded the 150th Rifle Division, credited with the capture of the Reichstag during the Battle of Berlin.

== Early life ==
Vasily Mitrofanovich Shatilov was born on 17 February 1902 to a peasant family in the village of Kalmyk, Voronezh Governorate. Conscripted into the Red Army in May 1924, he was sent to the 8th Caucasian Rifle Regiment of the 3rd Caucasian Rifle Division at Leninakan as a Red Army man. Shatilov rose to assistant platoon commander in November of that year and became a cadet at the Tiflis Infantry School in September 1925. Upon his graduation from the school in September 1928, he was posted to the 56th Rifle Regiment of the 19th Rifle Division (Soviet Union) at Bobrov, with which he served for the next seven years. Initially a rifle platoon commander, Shatilov successively became a regimental school platoon commander, company commander and political officer, and assistant battalion chief of staff.

Shatilov was sent to receive advanced training at the Frunze Military Academy in April 1935, and following his graduation from its motorization and mechanization department in September 1938 was appointed assistant chief of staff of the 10th Tank Brigade of the Belorussian Special Military District at Borisov. Serving as chief of staff of the new 46th Light Tank Brigade from 19 August 1939, he participated with it in the Soviet invasion of Poland. Shatilov transferred to become chief of staff of the 27th Separate Light Tank Brigade at Riga, commanded by Colonel Ivan Chernyakhovsky, in April 1940 and then held the same position with the 196th Rifle Division of the Odessa Military District from March 1941.

== Soviet-German War ==
After Operation Barbarossa began, Shatilov and his division fought in the border battles and in the Battle of Kiev. The 196th was encircled on 23 September and destroyed. When division commander Konstantin Kulikov was ambushed and taken prisoner, Shatilov replaced him. Shatilov reached Soviet lines with a group of eight others on 3 October in the area of Shishaki north of Khorol, still armed and in possession of his documents.

Appointed chief of staff of the 200th Rifle Division, forming and training in the South Ural Military District at Buzuluk, in January 1942, Shatilov was sent with the unit to the Northwestern Front in March and April. After joining the 11th Army of the front, the division fought in the Demyansk Offensive, then defended positions on the Lovat. By now a colonel, he was appointed commander of the 182nd Rifle Division on 30 August 1942. The division defended positions northeast of Staraya Russa as part of the 27th Army until late 1942 and in February 1943 fought in the second Demyansk Offensive, breaking through to the Porusye River and capturing Goroshkovo. Withdrawn to the 34th Army reserve in May, the 182nd returned to action on 18 February with the 1st Shock Army of the 2nd Baltic Front during the Leningrad–Novgorod Offensive and fought in the attack on Dretino. Pursuing the retreating German troops, Shatilov's division reached Dno on 23 February and recaptured the city, for which it received the name of the city as an honorific.

Shatilov took command of the 150th Rifle Division, which he led for the rest of the war, on 30 April 1944. As part of the 79th Rifle Corps of the 3rd Shock Army of the front, the division fought in the Rezhitsa–Dvinsk Offensive and the Madona Offensive, in which it captured Sebezh and Idritsa. The 150th received the name of the latter as an honorific and in late 1944 with the corps and army fought in the Baltic Offensive and the Riga Offensive. With its corps and army, the 150th was transferred to the 1st Belorussian Front in late December for the Vistula–Oder Offensive. After the end of the latter, the division participated in the East Pomeranian Offensive in early 1945, in which it was decorated for its role in the capture of Stargard.

=== Battle of Berlin ===
On 16 April 1945, the division crossed the Oder in the vicinity of Wriezen, reaching Berlin on 21 April. It was tasked with hoisting the Victory Banner on the Reichstag. On the morning of 30 April, after days of heavy fighting in the streets of the German capital, the Division stormed the building. Soldiers of the division hoisted several Soviet flags atop the structure, one of which – placed by Meliton Kantaria, Mikhail Yegorov and Alexei Berest – was eventually proclaimed the official Victory Banner (Though the first flag was probably hoisted by the division's soldier Mikhail Minin). Shatilov was awarded the title Hero of the Soviet Union and the Order of Lenin on 29 May for his leadership of the division.

== Postwar ==
He continued to command the 150th as part of the Group of Soviet Occupation Forces in Germany until it was disbanded in December 1946, transferring to command the 15th Mechanized Division. After commanding the 207th Rifle Division from April 1948, Shatilov completed the Higher Academic Course at the Voroshilov Military Academy between 15 June 1948 and 3 May 1949. Appointed commander of the 36th Rifle Division of the Transbaikal Military District, Shatilov advanced to command the 18th Guards Rifle Corps in July 1952 and the 39th Guards Airborne Corps in January 1955. Placed at the disposal of the Main Personnel Directorate in December of that year, he was appointed first deputy commander of the Volga Military District in February 1956. Shatilov ended his career as first deputy commander of the Far Eastern Military District in December 1957, being promoted to colonel general in 1963 before his retirement in March 1964. Shatilov lived in Moscow and died on 16 February 1995. He was buried at Kuntsevo Cemetery.

== Awards and honors ==
Shatilov was a recipient of the following decorations:

Soviet Union and Russia

Hero of the Soviet Union (29 May 1945)
Order of Lenin, twice (29 May 1945, 15 November 1950)
Order of the October Revolution
Order of the Red Banner, thrice (27 July 1943, 4 November 1944, 5 November 1954)
Order of Kutuzov, 2nd class, twice (29 July 1944, 6 April 1945)
Order of the Patriotic War, 1st class (11 March 1985)
Order of the Red Star (14 February 1943)
Medal "For the Liberation of Warsaw" (1945)
Medal "For the Capture of Berlin" (1945)
Medal "For the Victory over Germany in the Great Patriotic War 1941–1945" (1945)
Jubilee Medal "Twenty Years of Victory in the Great Patriotic War 1941-1945" (1965)
Jubilee Medal "Thirty Years of Victory in the Great Patriotic War 1941–1945" (1975)
Jubilee Medal "Forty Years of Victory in the Great Patriotic War 1941–1945" (1985)
Jubilee Medal "50 Years of Victory in the Great Patriotic War 1941–1945" (1993)
Jubilee Medal "In Commemoration of the 100th Anniversary of the Birth of Vladimir Ilyich Lenin" (1969)
Jubilee Medal "30 Years of the Soviet Army and Navy" (1948)
Jubilee Medal "40 Years of the Armed Forces of the USSR" (1958)
Jubilee Medal "50 Years of the Armed Forces of the USSR" (1968)
Jubilee Medal "60 Years of the Armed Forces of the USSR" (1978)
Jubilee Medal "70 Years of the Armed Forces of the USSR" (1988)
Medal "Veteran of the Armed Forces of the USSR" (1976)

Poland

Cross of Valour
Order of the Cross of Grunwald, 3rd class
Medal "For Oder, Neisse and the Baltic"
Medal "For Warsaw 1939-1945"
