= Semyon Perevyortkin =

- Семён Перевёрткин

First Deputy Minister of Internal Affairs
- In office 8 July 1953 – 13 January 1960

Personal details
- Born: 21 July 1905
- Died: 17 May 1961 (aged 55)
- Resting place: Novodevichy Cemetery, Moscow

Military service
- Allegiance: Soviet Union
- Branch/service: Soviet Ground Forces
- Rank: Colonel-general
- Commands: 79th Rifle Corps; 207th Rifle Division

Semyon Nikiforovich Perevyortkin (Russian: Семён Никифорович Перевёрткин; July 21, 1905 – May 17, 1961) was a Soviet military leader, Colonel General (February 18, 1958), and Hero of the Soviet Union (May 29, 1945). He commanded the 79th Rifle Corps (May 1944 – May 1946) of the 3rd Shock Army, whose soldiers stormed the Reichstag and raised the Victory Banner on it on May 1, 1945.

== Biography ==
He hoined the Red Army in April 1921. He served in the Communist Special Purpose Battalion in Voronezh and was sent for training in September. Graduated from the 17th Vladikavkaz Infantry School of Command Staff in 1924. Was a rifle platoon commander and platoon commander of the regimental school of the 56th Rifle Regiment of the 19th Rifle Division of the Moscow Military District (Voronezh). From 1926, he became a platoon commander, course commander, and commander for assignments to the head of the All-Russian Central Executive Committee Joint Military School in Moscow. From June 1930, he served as secretary to the Chief of Armaments of the Red Army, Mikhail Tukhachevsky. From February 1931, he became a battalion commander of the 47th Rifle Regiment of the Leningrad Military District. In June of that year, he was appointed to serve on special assignments in the Directorate of the Chief of Armaments of the Red Army. He held this rank until September 1934, when he was sent to study at the academy. When military ranks were introduced in the Red Army in 1935, Perevyortkin was awarded the rank of captain.

He graduated from the Frunze Military Academy of the Red Army in 1937. He was not reassigned for about a year after graduation. From June 1938, he was assistant chief of staff of the 53rd Rifle Division of the Volga Military District (division headquarters – Saratov).

He participated in the Soviet-Finnish War (1939–1940) from January 1940. At the front, he commanded the 39th and 110th separate Saratov ski battalions of the 173rd Rifle Division. After the end of hostilities in April, he returned to Saratov to his previous position, and in June of that same year, 1940, he was appointed instructor in the General Tactics Department at the Frunze Military Academy of the Red Army. In March 1941, he was appointed chief of staff of the 220th Motorized Division in the Oryol Military District.

=== World War II ===
Perevyortkin served on the fronts of the Great Patriotic War from June 1941. At the end of June, the division departed for the Western Front, was incorporated into the 19th Army, and participated in the Battle of Smolensk. In August, it was reformed as the 220th Rifle Division and transferred to the 49th Army of the same front. In late September, Perevyortkin was recalled to Moscow and sent to study at the Voroshilov Academy of the General Staff of the Red Army. However, he only had 12 days of training. After the German general offensive on Moscow began in October 1941, he was urgently sent back to the front and appointed deputy chief of the operations department of the 5th Army headquarters on the Western Front. In February 1942, he became chief of the operations department of the 5th Army headquarters. Participant in the Battle of Moscow and the Rzhev-Vyazma Offensive Operation of 1942. Colonel (February 19, 1942). He was wounded in an accident on May 9, 1943.

After being discharged from the hospital in July 1943, he was appointed commander of the 207th Rifle Division in the 5th Army of the Western Front. In this army, the division distinguished itself in the Smolensk operation and participated in the liberation of Smolensk. In September, it was transferred to the 2nd Baltic Front and participated in local offensive operations in the Vitebsk-Polotsk area. In January 1944, the division was transferred to the 3rd Shock Army and participated in the Staraya Russa-Novorzhev Offensive Operation.

From May 1944 until Victory Day, he commanded the 79th Rifle Corps of the 3rd Shock Army on the 2nd Baltic Front, and from December 1944, on the 1st Belorussian Front. He led the corps in the Rezhitsa-Dvina, Madona, Baltic Strategic (Riga Front), Vistula-Oder, and East Pomeranian Offensive Operations. He was promoted to Major General (July 29, 1944) and Lieutenant General (July 11, 1945).

Major General Perevyortkin, commander of the 79th Rifle Corps (3rd Shock Army, 1st Belorussian Front), distinguished himself in the Battle of Berlin from April 16 to May 8, 1945. He skillfully led the corps' units during the breakthrough of enemy defenses, the advance to Berlin, and street fighting within the city. The corps' rifle divisions—the 150th under Major General Vasily Shatilov, the 171st under Colonel Aleksey Negoda, and the 207th under Colonel Vasily Asafov—were the first to break into central Berlin, disperse the enemy group, and storm the Reichstag. Counterintelligence officers from his corps, under the command of Lieutenant Colonel Ivan Klimenko, discovered the bodies of Hitler and Goebbels near a bunker in the courtyard of the Reich Chancellery.

By decree of the Presidium of the Supreme Soviet of the USSR on May 29, 1945, for his skillful leadership of the corps' troops, exemplary performance of combat missions, and courage and heroism in battles against the Nazi invaders, Perevyortkin was awarded the title Hero of the Soviet Union and the Order of Lenin and the Gold Star Medal (No. 6734) of the Hero of the Soviet Union.

Two of the general's brothers also fought at the front. Perevyortkin (chief of the technical service of the 22nd Cavalry Regiment) went missing in action in September 1941. Guards Major Perevyortkin ended the war as chief of the topographic department of the 2nd Guards Army headquarters. During the war, he was awarded four military orders. After the war, he was discharged into the reserve with the rank of colonel.

=== Post-war ===
After Germany's surrender, he continued to command the same corps, which was incorporated into the Group of Soviet Forces in Germany. In May 1946, he was appointed Chief of the 1st Department and Deputy Chief of the Directorate for Combat Training Planning of the Soviet Ground Forces. In May 1948, his position was reorganized, and Perevyortkin became Deputy Chief of the Directorate for Combat Training of the Ground Forces for Planning. From May 1950, he became Deputy Chief of the Main Directorate for Combat and Physical Training of the Ground Forces, and from January 1953, he served as Acting Chief of this Main Directorate.

Following the arrest of Lavrenty Beria and the dismissal of his former subordinates, he was sent to work in the Soviet Ministry of Internal Affairs. From July 8, 1953 to March 15, 1956, he was Deputy Minister of Internal Affairs of the USSR for Troops; from March 15, 1956 to January 13, 1960, he was First Deputy Minister of Internal Affairs of the Soviet Union and a member of the Collegium of the USSR Ministry of Internal Affairs. In 1958, he led the Ministry of Internal Affairs operational group during the suppression of mass riots in Grozny. From 1953 to 1960, he simultaneously served as Chairman of the Central Council of the All-Union Voluntary Sports Society "Dynamo".

On February 18, 1958, he was awarded the military rank of "Colonel General".

From April 1960, he became Chief of the Directorate of Military Educational Institutions of the Ground Forces of the Soviet Ministry of Defense; from January 1961, he became Chief of the Directorate of Higher Education Institutions and Extra-Military Training of the Ground Forces.

=== Death ===
He died on May 17, 1961, near the village of Nadezhdovka (110 km southwest of Odessa) while on duty in an aviation accident (an Mi-4 helicopter crash) along with Hero of the Soviet Union, General of the Army Vladimir Kolpakchi. The circumstances of the generals' deaths were long hushed up. He is buried in Novodevichy Cemetery in Moscow (section 8).

Due to his untimely death, he did not have time to write his memoirs, writing only a short essay about his corps' participation in the assault on Berlin, "The Decisive Strike" (published in the Leninets newspaper of the Annensky District on May 9, 1985).

== Awards ==
- Gold Star Medal of the Hero of the Soviet Union (No. 6734, May 29, 1945);
- Two Order of Lenin (May 29, 1945, May 6, 1946);
- Three Order of the Red Banner (August 31, 1941, November 3, 1944, November 19, 1951);
- Order of Suvorov, 2nd Class (April 6, 1945);
- Order of Kutuzov, 2nd Class (September 28, 1943);
- Order of Bogdan Khmelnitsky, 2nd Class (July 30, 1944);
- Order of the Red Star (May 4, 1942);
- Medals;
- Order of the Cross of Grunwald, 1st Class (Polish People's Republic);
