= 326th Rifle Division =

- Active: 1941–1946
- Country: Soviet Union
- Branch: Red Army
- Type: Infantry
- Size: Division
- Engagements: Battle of Moscow; Battles of Rzhev; Operation Kutuzov; Battle of Smolensk (1943); Baltic Offensive; Vistula-Oder Offensive; East Pomeranian Offensive; Berlin Strategic Offensive Operation
- Decorations: Order of the Red Banner
- Battle honours: Roslavl

Commanders
- Notable commanders: Col. Vladimir Semyonovich Andreev; Col. Georgii Petrovich Karamyshev; Maj. Gen. Vasily Grigorovich Terentev; Col. Ivan Ivanovich Oborin; Col. Nikolai Nikolaievich Lozhkin; Maj. Gen. Grigory Semyonovich Kolchanov

The 326th Rifle Division was formed as a standard Red Army rifle division late in the summer of 1941, as part of the massive buildup of new Soviet fighting formations in response to the German invasion. Like several other divisions in the 320-330 series, it was not fully trained and equipped when thrown into the Soviet winter counteroffensive, and after taking heavy losses mostly served on relatively quiet sectors into 1943, apart from several weeks of costly and futile fighting during Operation Mars. As the offensive into German-occupied western Russia developed during the autumn of that year the soldiers of the division distinguished themselves in the liberation of Roslavl in September. During 1944 the unit continued its combat path through the Baltic states, and in the following year helped liberate Poland and drive into Germany, ending the war near the Baltic coast in western Pomerania.

== Formation ==
The 326th Rifle Division began forming in August 1941, at Saransk in the Moscow Military District. When it was formed it was noted as having an ethnic makeup of about 60 percent Russians and 40 percent Tatars (Mordvins). Its basic order of battle was as follows:

- 1097th Rifle Regiment
- 1099th Rifle Regiment
- 1101st Rifle Regiment
- 888th Artillery Regiment

The division received its first commander, Col. Vladimir Semyonovich Andreev, on September 6, and was assigned to the 10th (Reserve) Army in the Volga Military District in October. This army was deployed in the last week of November west of the Oka River, downstream from Kashira, to defend both Kolomna and Ryazan from the German 2nd Panzer Army. The 326th was ordered into the attack in 10th Army in early December, during the counteroffensive in front of Moscow, while it was still short of weapons, equipment and training. It remained in this Army, in Western Front, until August 1942.

=== Battle of Moscow ===
In late November the division was located at Penza, but by the 29th had redeployed westward to Shilovo, along with the Army staff and communications units. The 326th was noted as having insufficient weaponry, including antitank guns, mortars and machine guns, and also lacking communications equipment and transport.

As the counteroffensive began on December 6 the division reached a line from Durnoe to Semyonovskoe. The Army as a whole was facing the main forces of 29th and 10th Motorized Divisions, with units of 18th Panzer Division and 112th Infantry Division farther south. As the advance unfolded the Army's left-flank divisions, including the 326th, tended to lag, forcing Western Front headquarters to demand that the pace be increased. On the morning of December 11, Army commander Lt. Gen. Filipp Golikov issued orders that the leading divisions, including the 326th, reach the line Uzlovaya station - Bogoroditsk - Kuzovka over the next 24 hours. On December 13 the division overcame the resistance of several small enemy groups, and reached a line from Kamenka to Klinovoe by the end of the next day. By the end of December 17 it had advanced past Sukhoi Ruchei. Colonel Andreev was wounded in action on December 19, and was replaced by Col. G. P. Nemudrov for the next month. As 10th Army began its Belyov-Kozelsk Operation on December 20, the 326th was concentrated in the area of Plavsk. By December 24 the division was moving up the Ryazantsevo - Astapovo road in the wake of the 330th Rifle Division. Three days later, as the fight for Belyov began, the 326th was in 10th Army's second echelon, about 15 km east of that town; over the preceding 20 days it had advanced about 220 km.

By December 29 the 326th was advancing along the route Moshchena - Skrylevo - Slagovishchi and by the next day had reached as far as 10 km southwest of Kozelsk. By January 2, 1942, it had made a fighting advance to the line Muzalevka - Berezovka - Slobodka as German reserves began to enter the picture. The division soon received orders to reach the area of Bordykino - Naumovo - Shlipovo by noon on January 5. The next day it had to overcome the resistance of the German 206th Infantry Division as it attacked along the Sukhinichi - Spas-Demensk railroad with the task of capturing the area of Dabuzha Station - Sobolevka - Shibaevka by the end of the day, but was unable to advance farther. On January 19 the German forces began a counter-attack along that rail line, and the 326th was forced over to the defensive. The next day Colonel Nemudrov handed command over to Col. Georgii Petrovich Karamyshev, who would hold this post for nearly all the rest of the year.

== Battles of Rzhev ==
The division was next assigned to the 16th Army of the same Front in August, then was transferred to 20th Army in October. While in this Army it took part in Operation Mars, beginning on November 25. The 326th was stationed on the far right flank of 20th Army, facing the defenses of the 195th Infantry Regiment of the German 102nd Infantry Division in the village strongpoint of Vaselki. According to the division's orders, it was to pin the Germans in Vaselki on the first day while other divisions to the south forced crossings of the Vazuza River and penetrated the second defensive line by the second day, crossing the Rzhev-Sychyovka railroad. At this point the 326th was to seize Vaselki, then wheel northwest along with the 42nd Guards and 251st Rifle Divisions to roll up the German defenses. In the event, the attack was a costly failure. The defenders were able to reoccupy their forward positions after the Soviet bombardment lifted, just in time to greet the advancing men of the 326th with withering machine gun and small arms fire. The first echelon regiments suffered heavy casualties for no gains; commitment of the second echelon the following day fared no better. For the balance of the operation the division held its positions, gradually wedging into the eastern part of Vaselki, but was in no condition for any sustained fighting; between November 25 and December 18 it was noted as having lost 1,248 dead, 3,156 wounded, and 81 missing-in-action, for a total of 4,485 casualties, the second highest among the rifle divisions of 20th Army. Colonel Karamyshev handed his command to Lt. Col. I. I. Yaremenko on December 13; this officer would be promoted to colonel on February 14, 1943, but would leave the division soon after. In January 1943, it was withdrawn into Front reserves for rebuilding.

=== Into Western Russia ===
In February the division was back in 16th Army. Maj. Gen. Vasilii Grigorovich Terentev took command on February 26. Following the Soviet victory at Stalingrad in early 1943, the STAVKA made every effort to make the local success more general, and 16th Army was ordered to attack the German defenses north of Zhizdra on February 22, 1943, in conjunction with other attacks by 61st and 3rd Armies, attempting to capture the salient around Oryol held by 2nd Panzer Army. The 326th, alongside the 324th Rifle Division on the far left, was one of six rifle divisions of its Army that made up a shock group backed by three tank brigades, with 9th Tank Corps in reserve. In the event, rain, mud-clogged roads and skillful German resistance brought the advance to a halt after gains of 7 km at most, and the tank corps was never committed.

When 16th Army became the 11th Guards Army on April 19, the 326th, like the 324th, was reassigned to 50th Army, where it remained until August. As of July 1, the division was in 38th Rifle Corps. During Operation Kutuzov, 50th Army took a secondary role, acting as a flank guard for 11th Guards, but still made substantial gains during July. On July 30, General Terentev was moved to command of the 70th Rifle Corps, and was replaced over the next two months by two colonels in succession. In August, 38th Corps was transferred to 10th Army for an offensive towards Roslavl. That city was liberated on September 25, and the 326th was one of four rifle divisions of its Army to be granted the name of the city as an honorific:

"ROSLAVL" - 326th Rifle Division (Colonel Gusev, Vladimir Aleksandrovich)... The troops who participated in the battles of Smolensk and Roslavl, by the order of the Supreme High Command of September 25, 1943, and a commendation in Moscow, are given a salute of 20 artillery salvoes from 224 guns.

Two days after this triumph, Colonel Gusev handed his command over to Col. Ivan Ivanovich Oborin. A few days later the combat path of the division took an unexpected turn, as it was removed to the Reserve of the Supreme High Command and moved north. In October it was reassigned to 79th Rifle Corps in the 3rd Shock Army of 2nd Baltic Front.

=== Baltic Campaign ===
Within a month the 326th was moved to 93rd Rifle Corps, in the same Army. On November 11, Col. Nikolai Nikolaievich Lozhkin took command from Colonel Oborin. In January 1944, 93rd Corps was transferred to Leningrad Front, and in February the division was transferred once again, now to 98th Rifle Corps in 42nd Army in the same Front. During this month it took part in the fighting at Nevel, then was shifted with its Corps to 67th Army, in the same Front, in March. In April, 67th Army became part of the new 3rd Baltic Front, and the 326th joined the 119th Rifle Corps, where it would remain for the summer. On June 18, Maj. Gen. Grigorii Semyonovich Kolchanov took command from Colonel Lozhkin, and would remain in this post for the duration of the war.

When the Baltic Offensive began in late June, the division found itself in the reserves of its Army, garrisoning the city of Porkhov. By two weeks later it had advanced towards the Panther Line, east of Pskov, as the offensive to break this German position began. Pskov was liberated by 67th Army on July 23, and by early August was advancing towards the Estonian border. Later that month the 326th was detached from 67th Army, and was serving in 118th Rifle Corps in the Group of Forces of the Northern Combat Sector; by mid-September it had advanced to the town of Elva. On September 7 the division was recognized for its efforts in the liberation of Tartu with the award of the Order of the Red Banner.

== Into Germany ==
In late September the 326th was withdrawn once again to the Reserve of the Supreme High Command for a brief period, then was assigned to the 116th Rifle Corps in the 2nd Shock Army, where it finally found a home for the duration. 2nd Shock was assigned to 2nd Belorussian Front at the end of October. With the rest of its Front, the 326th participated in the Vistula-Oder Offensive. When the Front's attack began on January 14, 1945, 2nd Shock Army was tasked to break out of the Rozan bridgehead across the Narew River, with the immediate goal of taking the town of Ciechanow and then, in conjunction with 65th Army, to eliminate the enemy in the Pultusk area. The 326th, along with its corps, was in reserve, and did not see action on that first day, nor the following. On the 17th, 2nd Shock liberated Ciechanow, but 116th Corps remained in second echelon.

By February 20, when the offensive was about to enter its second stage, the 326th was fighting, along with its Corps and Army, on the line of the Nogat and Vistula Rivers. As the operation entered its third stage on March 6, units of the 116th Corps, with the support of 8th Guards Tank Corps, broke through the German defenses and began fighting street-by-street for the town of Preußisch Stargard. Following this fighting in East Prussia the division was redeployed to take part in the East Pomeranian Offensive, and then the Berlin Strategic Offensive Operation, ending the war near Stralsund on the Baltic coast.

== Postwar ==
The soldiers of the 326th ended the war with the official title of 326th Rifle, Roslavl, Order of the Red Banner Division. (Russian: 326-я стрелковая Рославльская Краснознамённая дивизия.) It served in the Group of Soviet Forces in Germany, still in the same Corps and Army, into 1946. In February and March 1946, it was transferred to Dnipropetrovsk, becoming part of the 14th Guards Rifle Corps. On May 3 it was downsized into the 42nd Rifle Brigade, which was disbanded in March 1947, as part of the 52nd Rifle Corps after relocating to Haivoron.
