= 207th Rifle Division =

207th Rifle Division (4 March – 1 June 1941) 207th Rifle Division (April – 2 December 1942) 207th Rifle Division (6 June 1943 – 1946)
- Active: 1941–1946
- Country: Soviet Union
- Branch: Red Army
- Type: Infantry
- Size: Division
- Engagements: World War II; Operation Blue; Battle of Stalingrad; Battle of Smolensk; Šiauliai Offensive; Riga Offensive; Vistula-Oder Offensive; Battle of Berlin

The 207th Rifle Division began its combat path under unusual circumstances. It was partly formed for the first time as a standard Red Army rifle division in the spring of 1941, before the German invasion, but was never completed. A second formation began in April 1942 and was completed on June 1, after which it was sent to the Stalingrad Front. Heavily depleted in counterattacks against the north flank of German Sixth Army, by November the survivors were reassigned and the division disbanded. The 207th was formed for a third time in June 1943, and fought its way through the central part of the Soviet-German front, ending the war in the heart of Berlin in the battle for the Reichstag. The division saw postwar service in the Group of Soviet Forces in Germany.

== 1st Formation ==
The 207th Rifle Division began forming on March 4, 1941. Very little is known about this formation:

"[T]his division was officially disbanded on 1 June 1941, before the war started. The personnel were probably needed to fill up the new airborne brigades and antitank brigades being formed."

== 2nd Formation ==
The second 207th Rifle Division began forming in April 1942, to begin with in the North Caucasus Military District, based on a cadre from the 52nd Rifle Brigade. It did not have a commander assigned until after it moved to Ivanovo in the Moscow Military District in June. The division's primary order of battle was as follows:

- 594th Rifle Regiment
- 597th Rifle Regiment
- 598th Rifle Regiment
- 780th Artillery Regiment

The division was first assigned to the 10th Reserve Army in the Reserve of the Supreme High Command. In August it returned to the south, assigned to 24th Army in Stalingrad Front. During the following two months the 24th, along with the 66th and 1st Guards Armies, were thrown into a series of desperate and costly counterattacks against the north flank of the German "corridor" that led their positions in Stalingrad. In November the 207th was so worn down that its survivors were reassigned to help rebuild the 387th Rifle Division, and the division was officially disbanded in the Don Front on December 2.

== 3rd Formation ==
A new 207th Rifle Division was formed on June 6, 1943, in the 5th Army in Western Front, based on a cadre from the 40th Separate Red Banner Rifle Brigade and the 2nd formation of the 153rd Rifle Brigade. Its order of battle remained the same as the 2nd (and probably the 1st) formation. It inherited the Order of the Red Banner unit award that had been won by the 40th. The 40th Separate Rifle Brigade had been formed in accordance with an order dated 18 October 1941. The brigade was awarded the Order of the Red Banner on 13 December 1942, but the division did not officially inherit the award until November 1943. It included the following units:

- Headquarters
- 594th Rifle Regiment
- 597th Rifle Regiment
- 598th Rifle Regiment
- 780th Artillery Regiment
- 420th Separate Destroyer Anti-Tank Battalion
- 338th Separate Sapper Battalion
- 255th Separate Medical-Sanitary Battalion
- 249th Separate Reconnaissance Company
- 400th Separate Communications Company
- 186th Separate Chemical Defense Company

The division remained in 5th Army in Western Front until October, fighting towards Smolensk, until it was transferred to 10th Guards Army in the same Front. At the end of the year 10th Guards went to the 2nd Baltic Front, and in January 1944, the 207th joined the 79th Rifle Corps in 3rd Shock Army in the same Front. The division would remain in that army until postwar, and in that corps as well, apart from a temporary reassignment to 93rd Rifle Corps from Apr. - June 1944.

In December, following the Šiauliai Offensive and the Riga Offensive, 3rd Shock Army was transferred to the 1st Belorussian Front. In this Front it took part in the Vistula-Oder Offensive through Poland and eastern Germany, and the 207th distinguished itself in the conquest of eastern Pomerania, receiving the name of that German state as an honorific. During the Battle of Berlin in late April 1945, 3rd Shock helped outflank the north side of the city and 79th Corps opened long-range artillery fire on it on April 20. The next day, elements of the army, and several others, reached the suburbs and entered difficult urban combat. On April 29, against fanatic resistance, 79th Corps began the symbolic struggle for the Reichstag. The 207th supported its comrades of the 150th Rifle Division as they fought through the building and hoisted the Red Banner over it on the 30th.

=== Cold War ===
The soldiers of the 207th Rifle Division ended the war with the official title of 207th Rifle, Pomerania, Order of the Red Banner, Order of Suvorov Division. (Russian: 207-я стрелковая Померанская Краснознамённая ордена Суворова дивизия.) The division was awarded the Order of Suvorov, 2nd class on 28 May 1945. It went on to serve postwar with its army and its corps in the Group of Soviet Forces in Germany. Between 15 and 30 June 1945, receiving reinforcements from the disbanded 238th Rifle Division, the division expanded its rifle regiments to three battalions, forming a training battalion, training artillery battalion and the headquarters of its 415th Artillery Brigade, which included the 780th Gun Artillery Regiment, 693rd Howitzer Artillery Regiment, and the 601st Mortar Regiment. On 1 August 1945 the division included:

- Headquarters
- 594th, 597th, 598th Rifle Regiments
- Headquarters 415th Artillery Brigade
- 780th Gun Artillery, 693rd Howitzer Artillery Regiments, 601st Mortar Battalion
- 420th Separate Destroyer Anti-Tank Battalion
- 912th Separate Communications Battalion
- 338th Separate Sapper Battalion
- 255th Separate Medical-Sanitary Battalion
- 249th Separate Motorized Reconnaissance Company

In addition, the 546th Separate Self-Propelled Artillery Battalion (SU-76, formed from a reorganized self-propelled artillery regiment of the front) and the 953rd Separate Anti-Aircraft Artillery Battalion became part of the division. The 186th Chemical Defense Company was disbanded.

The division received personnel and equipment from the disbanded units of the 3rd Shock Army (the 150th, 33rd, and 23rd Guards Rifle Divisions and the 16th Mechanized Division) between November and December 1946. It was reorganized along a new table of organization and equipment in accordance with a directive of 25 February 1947, resulting in the following structure:

- Headquarters
- 594th, 597th, 598th Rifle Regiments
- 780th Gun Artillery, 693rd Howitzer Artillery Regiments
- 420th Separate Destroyer Anti-Tank Battalion, 953rd Separate Anti-Aircraft Artillery Battalion
- 338th Separate Motorized Sapper Battalion
- 912th Separate Communications Battalion, 255th Separate Medical-Sanitary Battalion

In addition, the 16th Guards Rechitsa Red Banner Orders of Suvorov and Bogdan Khmelnitsky Tank Self-Propelled Gun Regiment, reorganized in 1945 from the 16th Guards Tank Brigade, joined the division from the disbanded 15th Mechanized Division. It became the 155th Separate Motorcycle Battalion in March 1947. In the 1947 reorganization the 415th Artillery Brigade headquarters, 610th Mortar Regiment, 546th Separate Anti-Aircraft Artillery Battalion, 249th Motorized Separate Reconnaissance Company, and the separate training battalion were disbanded.

In accordance with a directive of 6 May 1954 the 953rd Separate Anti-Aircraft Artillery Battalion was expanded into the 2072nd Anti-Aircraft Artillery Regiment, the 115th Separate Motorcycle Battalion reorganized as the 115th Separate Reconnaissance Battalion (in July), and the 693rd Howitzer Artillery Regiment and 780th Gun Artillery Regiment reorganized as the 693rd and 780th Artillery Regiments, respectively. The division was renumbered as the 32nd Rifle Division on 16 May 1955. Accordingly, its elements also received new numbers:

- 594th Rifle Regiment became 33rd Berlin Rifle Regiment
- 597th Rifle Regiment became 40th Berlin Rifle Regiment
- 598th Rifle Regiment became 41st Berlin Rifle Regiment
- 2072nd Anti-Aircraft Artillery Regiment became 933rd Anti-Aircraft Artillery Regiment
- 420th Separate Destroyer Anti-Tank Battalion became 34th Separate Destroyer Anti-Tank Battalion

The 32nd Rifle Division was reorganized as the 32nd Motor Rifle Division on 29 April 1957. The rifle regiments were reorganized as motor rifle units while retaining their previous designations. The 780th Artillery Regiment and 34th Separate Destroyer Anti-Tank Battalion were disbanded. The following reorganizations also occurred:

- 115th Separate Reconnaissance Battalion to 131st Separate Reconnaissance Company
- 540th Separate Auto Transport Company to 110th Separate Auto Transport Battalion
- 16th Guards Tank Self-Propelled Regiment to 16th Guards Tank Regiment

In 1958 the 40th Motor Rifle Regiment was transferred to the 26th Guards Tank Division. The 245th Guards Motor Rifle Regiment became part of the division in exchange. A directive dated 29 September 1960 formed the 32nd Separate Tank Battalion in the division. On 31 December 1963 the 245th Guards were transferred to the 26th Guards Tank Division, and the 200th Guards Motor Rifle Regiment at Olympisches Dorf. The division was renumbered as the 207th Motor Rifle Division on 30 January 1965, restoring its wartime number. After being stationed at Stendal from 1957 to 1991, it was briefly moved to Yarmolintsy, Khmelnitskiy Oblast, before being disbanded in 1992.

=== Commanders ===
The following officers commanded the division:

- Colonel Semyon Perevyortkin (6 June 1943–25 May 1944)
- Colonel Ivan Mikulya (26 May–30 July 1944)
- Colonel Aleksandr Porkhachev (1 August 1944–8 January 1945)
- Colonel Semyon Sobolev (8 January–19 February 1945)
- Colonel Vasily Asafov (22 February 1945–24 June 1947)
- Major General Vasily Shatilov (24 June 1947–15 June 1948)
- Major General Savva Fomichenko (15 June 1948–11 January 1951)
- Major General Ivan Kuzmich Shcherbina (11 January 1951–30 March 1954)
- Colonel Anatoly Demidovich Andrushchenko (30 June 1954–26 September 1958, major general 8 August 1955)
- Colonel Vasily Mikhailovich Gorshkov (29 November 1958–25 January 1963, major general 7 May 1960)
- Colonel Yevgeny Fyodorovich Teodorovich (25 October 1963–15 May 1968, major general 16 June 1965)
- Colonel Vladimir Nikolayevich Veryovkin-Rakhalsky (15 May 1968–31 July 1970)
- Major General Nikolay Aleksandrovich Stolyarov (31 July 1970–1973)
- Colonel Valentin Matveyevich Pankratov (major general 25 April 1975)
