= Vasily Kuznetsov (general) =

Soviet general (1894–1964)

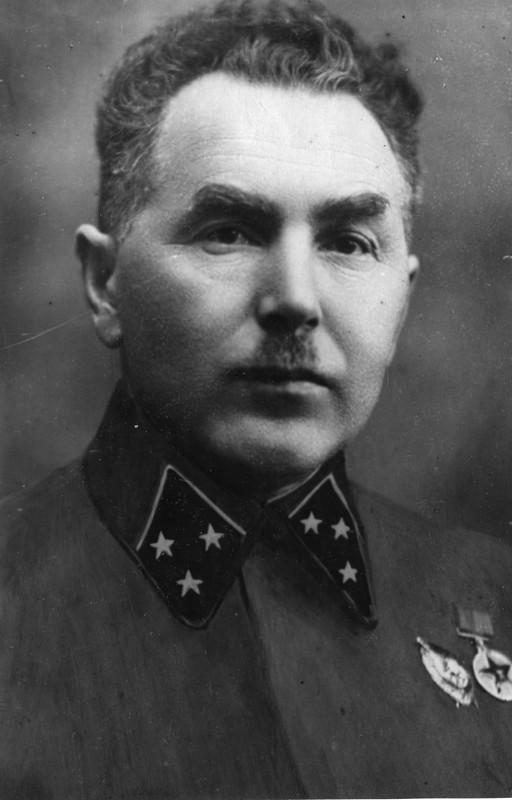
- Kuznetsov in 1942
- Born: 15 January 1894; Ust-Osolka, Perm Governorate, Russian Empire
- Died: 20 June 1964 (aged 70); Moscow, Russian SFSR, Soviet Union
- Burial place: Novodevichy Cemetery
- Military career
- Allegiance: Russia (1915–1917); Russian SFSR (1917–1922); Soviet Union (1922–1960)
- Branch: Imperial Russian Army; Red Army
- Service years: 1915–1960
- Rank: Colonel General
- Commands: 3rd Army; 21st Army; 58th Army; 19th Army; 1st Shock Army; 63rd Army; 1st Guards Army; 3rd Shock Army; Volga Military District
- Conflicts: World War I; Russian Civil War; World War II
- Awards: Hero of the Soviet Union

Vasily Ivanovich Kuznetsov (Russian: Васи́лий Ива́нович Кузнецо́в; 15 January [O.S. 3 January] 1894 – 20 June 1964) was a Soviet general. He received the title of Hero of the Soviet Union.

== Life and career ==
Kuznetsov was born to a working-class family of Russian ethnicity in Ust-Usolka, Solikamsky Uyezd, Perm Governorate. In April 1915, he was drafted into the Imperial Russian Army, taking part in World War I. In March 1916 he completed officer training in Kazan, attaining the rank of Podporuchik in July.

In August 1918, after the October Revolution, he joined the Red Army, serving in the Russian Civil War first as a company commander and later as a deputy regimental commander. In October 1923, he was appointed commander of 89th Rifle Regiment.

He joined the Communist Party in 1928. During 1929, he undertook advanced officers' training, and he graduated from the Frunze Academy in 1936. In October 1936, he became the 99th Rifle Division's commander. In July 1937, he was transferred to head the 16th Rifle Corps.

During September 1939, Komkor Kuznetsov participated in the Invasion of Poland as chief of the Vitebsk and Polotsk Army Groups. On 4 June 1940, with the introduction of new ranks, he became a lieutenant general.

=== World War 2 ===
On 22 June 1941, Kuznetsov's 3rd Army was stationed in Belarus, as part of the Western Front. It was overwhelmed and surrounded by German forces. In July, he and the remains of his formation broke out and returned to the Soviet lines. This feat earned him praise from Stalin when he issued Order No. 270. In late August, he was sent to command the Southwestern Front's 21st Army, but his force suffered crushing defeat once more in the Battle of Kiev. In October, he was appointed to command the Kharkov Military District but reassigned to head the 1st Shock Army on 23 November, with which he took part in the Battle of Moscow. His units liberated Klin and Solnechnogorsk.

In February 1942, the Army relocated to the north, taking part in the Demyansk operation. In July, Kuznetsov was given command of the 63rd Army, positioned near Stalingrad. The formation was renamed 1st Guards Army in November. For his conduct in the campaign, Kuznetsov was awarded the Order of Suvorov 1st Class. On 25 March 1943, he was promoted to the rank of Colonel General. The 1st Guards later took part in the battles for the Donbass region and in the Dniepr crossing. On 15 December, Kuznetsov was appointed Bagramyan's deputy in the 1st Baltic Front. In this capacity he participated in the campaigns for Belarus, the Baltics, and East Prussia. The Front was disbanded in late February 1945, and Kuznetsov assumed command over the 3rd Shock Army of the 1st Belorussian's on 16 March. The Army was involved in the urban fighting inside Berlin; on 30 April, one of its formations, the 150th Rifle Division, stormed the Reichstag. Its soldiers hoisted the Victory Banner atop the building.

=== Post-war career ===
On 29 May 1945, Kuznetsov was awarded the title Hero of the Soviet Union (Medal No. 6460) for his performance. After the war, he remained the 3rd Army's commander in Germany for a while, then attended the Voroshilov Academy, graduating in 1948. He served as chairman of the Voluntary Society for Cooperation with the Army and later of DOSAAF. From 1953 to 1957, he headed the Volga Military District. Until his retirement in 1960, he served in the Ministry of Defense. Kuznetsov was a deputy in the 2nd and 4th Convocations of the Supreme Soviet. He died in Moscow in 1964.

== Honours and awards ==
Soviet Union

Hero of the Soviet Union (29 May 1945)
Order of Lenin, twice (21 February 1945, 29 May 1945)
Order of the Red Banner, five times (22 February 1928, 22 February 1941, 2 January 1942, 3 November 1944, 20 June 1949)
Order of Suvorov, 1st class (28 January 1943)
Order of Suvorov, 2nd class (26 October 1943)
Medal "For the Defence of Stalingrad" (22 December 1942)
Medal "For the Defence of Moscow" (1 May 1944)
Medal "For the Liberation of Warsaw" (9 June 1945)
Medal "For the Capture of Berlin" (9 June 1945)
Medal "For the Victory over Germany in the Great Patriotic War 1941–1945" (9 May 1945)
Jubilee Medal "XX Years of the Workers' and Peasants' Red Army" (1938)
Jubilee Medal "30 Years of the Soviet Army and Navy" (1948)
Jubilee Medal "40 Years of the Armed Forces of the USSR" (1958)

Foreign Awards

Commander of the Legion of Honour (France)
Knight's Cross of the Virtuti Militari (Poland)
Order of the Cross of Grunwald, 3rd class (Poland)
