= 2nd Baltic Front =

- Active: 20 October 1943 - 1 April 1945
- Country: Soviet Union
- Branch: Red Army
- Type: Army Group Command
- Size: Several Armies
- Engagements: World War II; Polotsk–Vitebsk Offensive; Leningrad–Novgorod Offensive; Staraya Russa-Novorzhev Offensive; Rezhitsa–Dvinsk Offensive; Madona Offensive; Riga Offensive (1944)

Commanders
- Notable commanders: Markian Popov; Andrey Yeryomenko; Leonid Govorov

The 2nd Baltic Front (Russian: 2-й Прибалтийский фронт) was a major formation of the Red Army during the Second World War.

== History ==
The 2nd Baltic Front was formed on October 20, 1943 as a result of the renaming of the Baltic Front, itself a successor of the Bryansk Front 10 days earlier.

From 1 to 21 November 1943, the left wing of the Front took part in the Polotsk–Vitebsk Offensive.
In January-February, the front participated in the Leningrad–Novgorod Offensive of 1944. During the Staraya Russa-Novorzhev Offensive, the Front troops reached Ostrov, Pushkinskiye Gory and Idritsa. In July 1944, the Rezhitsa–Dvinsk Offensive was carried out and the Front advanced 200 km to the west. In August it conducted the Madona Offensive, during which it advanced another 60-70 km along the northern shore of the Daugava River and captured the city of Madona, a major junction of railways and highway roads.

In September-October 1944, during the Baltic Offensive, the front troops took part in the Riga Operation and by October 22 reached the Baltic Sea near the Memel river, blocking together with the troops of the 1st Baltic Front, the German Army Group North in the Courland Pocket. Subsequently, until April 1945, they continued the blockade and fought to destroy Army Group Courland.

On April 1, 1945, the front was abolished and its troops were transferred to the Leningrad Front.

== Composition ==
On 1 October 1944 the 2nd Baltic Front consisted of:

- 3rd Shock Army
  - 79th Rifle Corps
    - 150th Rifle Division
    - 171st Rifle Division
    - 207th Rifle Division
  - 100th Rifle Corps
    - 21st Guards Rifle Division
    - 28th Rifle Division
    - 200th Rifle Division
- 10th Guards Army
  - 7th Guards Rifle Corps
    - 7th Rifle Division
    - 8th Rifle Division
    - 119th Guards Rifle Division
  - 15th Guards Rifle Corps (29th, 30, 85th Guards Rifle Divisions)
  - 19th Guards Rifle Corps (22, 56, 65GRD)
  - 78th Tank Brigade
- 22nd Army
  - 93rd Rifle Corps (219, 379, 391 Rifle Divisions)
  - 130th Rifle Corps (43rd Guards Rifle Division, 308th Rifle Division)
  - 37th Rifle Division, 155FR, 118TB
- 42nd Army
  - 110th Rifle Corps (2, 168, 268RD)
  - 124th Rifle Corps (48th, 123rd, 256th Rifle Divisions)
  - 118FR, 29GTB
- 15th Air Army
  - 14th Fighter Aviation Corps (4, 148, 293 Fighter Aviation Regiments),
  - 188th Bomber Aviation Division,
  - 214th Assault Aviation Division
  - 225 Assault AvD
  - 284th Fighter-Bomber Aviation Division
  - 313th Fighter-Bomber Aviation Division
- Front Reserve
  - 5th Tank Corps (24, 41, 70TB, 5MotRB)

== Commanders ==
- Colonel-General Markian Popov (10.43 to 04.1944),
- Army General Andrey Yeryomenko (04.1944 to 02.1945),
- Marshal Leonid Govorov (02.1945 to 03.1945).
