= 364th Rifle Division =

364th Rifle Division (August 10, 1941 – 1945) 15th Mechanized Division (1945–1947)
- Active: 1941–1947
- Country: Soviet Union
- Branch: Red Army
- Type: Division
- Role: Infantry
- Engagements: Demyansk Pocket; Operation Iskra; Operation Pole Star; Leningrad-Novgorod Offensive; Pskov-Ostrov Offensive; Baltic Offensive; Vistula-Oder Offensive; Battle of Berlin
- Decorations: Order of the Red Banner
- Battle honours: Tosno

Commanders
- Notable commanders: Maj. Gen. Filipp Yakovlevich Solovyov; Col. Viktor Antonovich Vershbitsky; Col. Ivan Andreevich Vorobev

The 364th Rifle Division was an infantry division of the Red Army during World War II.

It began forming on August 10, 1941, as a standard Red Army rifle division at Omsk. It did not reach the front until March 1942, assigned to the 1st Shock Army in Northwestern Front. It served under these commands until September, then was pulled out of the line for rebuilding before being moved north to 8th Army of Volkhov Front. The division remained in Volkhov Front until the Front was disbanded in February 1944, fighting in Operation Iskra, which partly broke the siege of Leningrad, and then in the Leningrad-Novgorod Offensive, which completed the task, and won a battle honor. During the spring-summer 1944 it advanced through the Baltic States, being so worn down in the process that in September it was again moved to the reserves to be returned to a viable strength. In October it was reassigned to the 3rd Shock Army, and would advance with that Army through Poland and into Germany in 1945. The 364th ended the war in the Battle of Berlin with 1st Belorussian Front, and went on to serve postwar in the Group of Soviet Occupation Forces in Germany.

It was converted into the 15th Mechanized Division in late 1945; the latter was disbanded in the Moscow Military District in early 1947.

== Formation ==
The division began forming on August 10, 1941, at Omsk in the Siberian Military District. It shared much of its early history with the 362nd Rifle Division. Its partial order of battle was as follows:

- 1212th Rifle Regiment
- 1214th Rifle Regiment
- 1216th Rifle Regiment
- 937th Artillery Regiment

The division's first commander, Maj. Gen. Filipp Yakovlevich Solovyov, (an NKVD officer) was assigned on September 27. The division was not rushed to the front; in early November it was assigned to the 58th (Reserve) Army, which was also forming in the Siberian District, in the Reserve of the Supreme High Command. In February 1942, it was finally assigned to the 1st Shock Army in Northwestern Front, where it fought in the battles around Demyansk. In September the division went back to the Reserve of the Supreme High Command for rebuilding. In December it returned to the front, now in the 8th Army of Volkhov Front.

== Battles for Leningrad ==
The 364th was part of the reinforcements allocated to Volkhov Front in the buildup to Operation Iskra. This offensive began early on January 12, 1943, and by the morning of the 18th elements of the Volkhov and Leningrad Fronts had linked up, establishing a land corridor to the besieged city. 8th Army played strictly a supporting role in Iskra and the division saw little action.

This victory prompted the newly-promoted Marshal Georgy Zhukov to begin planning a larger operation, dubbed "Pole Star", to cut off and defeat most of the German forces still in the Leningrad region. As part of the regrouping for this offensive the 364th was transferred to 2nd Shock Army in late January. Volkhov Front's forces were ordered to attack on February 8 and capture Siniavino and the Gorodok No. 1 and No. 2 regions, directly south of the Iskra corridor. In the event the attack did not begin until the 12th. 2nd Shock's assault on Siniavino and its adjacent heights faltered immediately with heavy losses.

In early March, the division returned to the 8th Army, remaining until January 1944. On March 12, General Solovyov became the deputy commanding officer of that Army, and he was replaced in command of the 364th by Col. Viktor Antonovich Vershbitsky. On the 19th, 8th Army launched a new offensive to liberate the town of Mga jointly with the 55th Army attacking from the northwest; the division was in the Army's second echelon. Through three days of intense fighting the first-echelon divisions penetrated 3 to 4 km on a 7 km-wide front. A mobile group based on one regiment of the 64th Guards Rifle Division drove deep into the German positions but was soon barely contained. The fighting continued until April 3, when the spring thaw forced a halt.

A fifth attempt to liberate Siniavino began in July. 8th Army was to attack from a 13.6 km sector in the Voronovo region, penetrate the enemy defenses and exploit to link up near Mga with the 55th and 67th Armies. The attacking forces were divided into two shock groups, with the 364th, reinforced with a tank regiment, in the first echelon of the southern group. This group faced the remnants of 5th Mountain Division and the left flank regiment of the 69th Infantry Division. The attack began at 0635 hours on July 22, but had been preceded by six days of artillery preparation attempting to destroy as much of the German fixed defenses as possible. The assault troops gained the first enemy trenches, but then encountered stiff resistance and heavy airstrikes; many of the tanks bogged down in the marshy terrain. In late July the second echelon divisions were committed to the battle, but made little difference. On August 9 units of the southern group found what they thought was a weak point in the positions held by 5th Mountain. The group was reinforced with two more rifle divisions and two tank regiments and attacked again on August 11. This effort was successful in taking the strongpoint at Poreche, but was again halted when the German 132nd Infantry Division arrived as reinforcements. The offensive collapsed in sheer exhaustion and ended on the 14th. The 364th was also involved in the sixth Siniavino offensive which finally seized the objective on September 15.

When the Leningrad-Novgorod Offensive began on January 14, 1944, the division was still in 8th Army. As Volkhov Front began its advance in the direction of Luga it began to encounter stiffer German resistance along the Rollbahn Line. As a result, on January 25 the 364th was assigned to the recently formed 119th Rifle Corps, and that Corps was reassigned to the 54th Army. On the following day the division distinguished itself in the liberation of the town of Tosno, and was given its name as an honorific:

"TOSNO... 364th Rifle Division (Colonel Vershbitsky, Viktor Antonovich)... By order of the Supreme High Command of January 28, 1944, and a commendation in Moscow, the troops who took part in the battles for the towns of Tosno and Lyuban are given a salute of 12 artillery volleys from 124 guns.

As of February 1 it was back to being a separate division in the reserves of Volkhov Front.

== Baltic Campaign ==
Volkhov Front was disbanded later in February, at which time the 364th was back in 54th Army, which was now in Leningrad Front. By the end of April it was in the 123rd Rifle Corps of 67th Army in the 3rd Baltic Front, and it continued to serve in that Front through the summer. On May 29, Colonel Vershbitskii was replaced in command by Col. Fyodor Aristarovich Makulkin, who was in turn replaced by Col. Ivan Andreevich Vorobev on July 9. Vorobev would continue in command for the duration of the war. By this time the division was down to 5,000 men; on July 24 it was reorganized with 4,202 total personnel, and just 60 men in each rifle company, after fighting southeast of Ostrov since the end of March. By August 1 the division was back in 1st Shock Army, having just helped to liberate Ostrov. However, its strength was minimal at this point. The 1212th Rifle Regiment had just 693 men in two small rifle battalions, and the 1216th Rifle Regiment had 718 men total, organized into five rifle companies and one reconnaissance platoon. In September the division was finally pulled back into the reserve of the 3rd Baltic Front. When that Front was disbanded in October, the division was reassigned to the 3rd Shock Army.

== Into Germany ==
3rd Shock was assigned to the 1st Belorussian Front on November 29, 1944, and the 364th was noted as being in that Army's 7th Rifle Corps at that time. It would remain under these commands for the duration of the war. During the Vistula-Oder Offensive the Army was mostly in the second echelon of the Front, operating with minimal forces in a mopping-up role. On March 24, then-Jr. Lt. Yuri Mikhailovich Arkhipov was awarded the Gold Star of a Hero of the Soviet Union (Medal No. 8031) in recognition of his courage and leadership while serving as a senior sergeant squad leader of the 1216th Rifle Regiment on March 31, 1944, in the forced crossing of the Velikaya River near Ostrov.

In late March, 3rd Shock was positioned on the Oder River, and was being massively reinforced with supporting arms for the battle for Berlin. As of April 15 it was deployed in the Küstrin bridgehead on an 11 km front from Ortwig to Letschin. The main attack would be made on the left flank on a 6 km front from Amt Keinitz to Letschin. The 364th at this time, like the rest of the Front's rifle divisions, had a strength of somewhere between 5,000 and 6,000 personnel. 7th Corps was in the second echelon, behind the 79th Rifle and 12th Guards Rifle Corps. The main offensive began on April 16, and during the next day the Corps crossed the Oder before concentrating north of Letschin. During the fighting on April 18, 3rd Shock completed the breakthrough of the German's second defensive zone, while 7th Corps remained in reserve.

The Corps was finally committed to the battle on the morning of April 22 from behind 3rd Shock Army's left front, advancing 2 km, and by the end of the day was fighting in the western outskirts of Hohenschönhausen, within Berlin itself. On April 23, Senior Sergeant Semyon Vasilievich Gretsov was uniquely awarded his sixth Medal "For Courage". Gretsov was a medical technician of the 1214th Rifle Regiment who was credited with evacuating 130 of his wounded comrades from the battlefield from July 1943 to April 1945, being wounded himself twice in the process. By the end of April 25 the city was encircled. 7th Corps and 12th Guards Corps broke through the urban defensive line southwest and south of Weissensee and began fighting in the city's core. Throughout the next five days the 7th Corps was engaged in stubborn fighting to take the city blocks next to the Friedrichshain Park and other positions north of the Spree River and made painfully slow gains, even as the 79th Corps was planting the victory banner on the Reichstag and linking up with 8th Guards Army in the city's center.

== Postwar ==
When the war ended, the division held the official name of 364th Rifle, Tosno Division (in Russian: 364-я стрелковая Тосненская дивизия). According to STAVKA Order No. 11095 of May 29, 1945, part 2, the 364th is listed as one of the rifle divisions to be retained as part of the Group of Soviet Forces in Germany, in the 7th Rifle Corps of 3rd Shock Army. On June 11 the division was recognized for its service in the Berlin Operation with the award of the Order of the Red Banner.

In late 1945 the division was converted into the 15th Mechanized Division. The 1212th Regiment became the 45th Mechanized Regiment, the 1214th the 46th, and the 1216th the 48th. The 116th and 120th Guards Tank Regiments were added to the division, formed from the 375th Guards Heavy and 1826th Self-Propelled Artillery Regiments and the 400th Guards Self-Propelled Artillery Regiment, respectively. On 6 June 1946 it was relocated to the Moscow Military District with the corps. It was disbanded there on 20 March 1947 with its mechanized regiments. The 116th Guards Tank Regiment was transferred to the 45th Rifle Division, while the 120th Guards went to the 261st Rifle Division.
