= 79th Rifle Corps =

- Active: July 1943–March 1955
- Country: Soviet Union
- Branch: Red Army (Soviet Army from 1946)
- Type: Infantry (Rifle corps)
- Engagements: World War II

Commanders
- Notable commanders: Yakov Cherevichenko; Vladimir Janjgava

The 79th Rifle Corps (Russian: 79-й стрелковый корпус) was a rifle corps of the Red Army in World War II that became part of the Soviet Army during the Cold War.

== World War II ==
The corps was formed in July 1943 as a headquarters with no troops assigned, and subordinated to the Ural Military District. The headquarters was subsequently transferred to the 21st Army of the Western Front in August, and the 20th Army of the Reserve of the Supreme High Command in September. The 79th joined the 3rd Shock Army of the 2nd Baltic Front in October, with which it remained for the rest of the war, and was assigned the 146th and 326th Rifle Divisions under the command of Major General Fyodor Zuyev from 15 October. The 146th and 326th were replaced by the 28th, 171st, and 219th Rifle Divisions in November.

A 1945 Victory Banner of the 150th Rifle Division, identifying it as a unit of the 79th Rifle Corps, 3rd Shock Army, 1st Belorussian Front

On May 1, 1945, the 79th Rifle Corps was the superior headquarters for the 150th, 171st, and 207th Rifle Divisions. The 150th Rifle Division was among those units that stormed the Reichstag.

In recognition of its actions, the corps received the Berlin honorific shortly after the end of the war.

== Postwar ==
Postwar, it remained part of the 3rd Shock Army (redesignated as the 3rd Army in 1954) in the Group of Soviet Occupation Forces in Germany (renamed the Group of Soviet Forces in Germany in 1954), stationed at Stendal. The 171st Rifle Division was converted into the 16th Mechanized Division by the end of 1945, but was withdrawn to the Moscow Military District and disbanded there in 1946. The 150th Rifle Division was disbanded in Germany later that year, and was replaced by the 19th Guards Mechanized Division, transferred from the 8th Guards Army; the corps consisted of the 207th and the 19th Guards for the rest of its existence. In accordance with a General Staff directive of 4 March 1955 and a Ministry of Defense order of 13 June, the corps was renumbered as the 23rd Rifle Corps. The headquarters of the latter was disbanded on 4 July 1956, with its divisions directly subordinated to the army headquarters.

== Commanders ==
The following officers commanded the corps during its existence:

- Major General Fyodor Zuyev (15 October 1943–23 May 1944)
- Colonel Semyon Perevyortkin (promoted to Major General 29 July 1944 and Lieutenant General 11 July 1945; 24 May 1944–May 1946)
- Colonel General Yakov Cherevichenko (6 June 1946–June 1948)
- Lieutenant General Nikolay Nikitin (June 1948–March 1951)
- Lieutenant General Boris Shulgin (March 1951–24 November 1953)
- Lieutenant General Vladimir Janjgava (25 November 1953–4 July 1956)
