= Victory Banner =

Banner raised by Red Army soldiers in Berlin

"Banner of Victory #5" was raised just below a statue on the roof of the Reichstag building

The Symbol of Victory Banner (1996–2007) was an alternative to using the historic Victory Banner, until pressure from Red Army veterans caused the original flag to be used again.

The Victory Banner or Banner of Victory (Russian: Знамя Победы, romanized: Znamya Pobedy) was the banner raised by Red Army soldiers on the Reichstag building in Berlin on 1 May 1945, the day after Adolf Hitler committed suicide. This particular banner was raised by three Soviet soldiers: Alexei Berest, Mikhail Yegorov, and Meliton Kantaria, but it was not the only one Soviet banner on the Reichstag at that time, see Raising a Flag over the Reichstag for details.

The Victory Banner, made under battlefield conditions, is the official symbol of the victory of the Soviet Union over Nazi Germany during the Second World War. It is also one of the national treasures of Russia. The Cyrillic inscription reads:

150 стр. ордена Кутузова II ст. идрицк. див. 79 С. К. 3 У. А. 1 Б. Ф.

Translated and with abbreviations changed to their referents, the flag's writing means:

150th Rifle Order of Kutuzov 2nd class Idritsa Division 79th Rifle Corps 3rd Shock Army 1st Belorussian Front

Although this flag was not the only one to be hoisted on the Reichstag, it was the only survivor of all the "official" flags specially prepared to be raised there.

According to the Law of the Russian Federation, the Banner of Victory is to be stored forever in a place which provides its safety and public availability.

== Origin ==
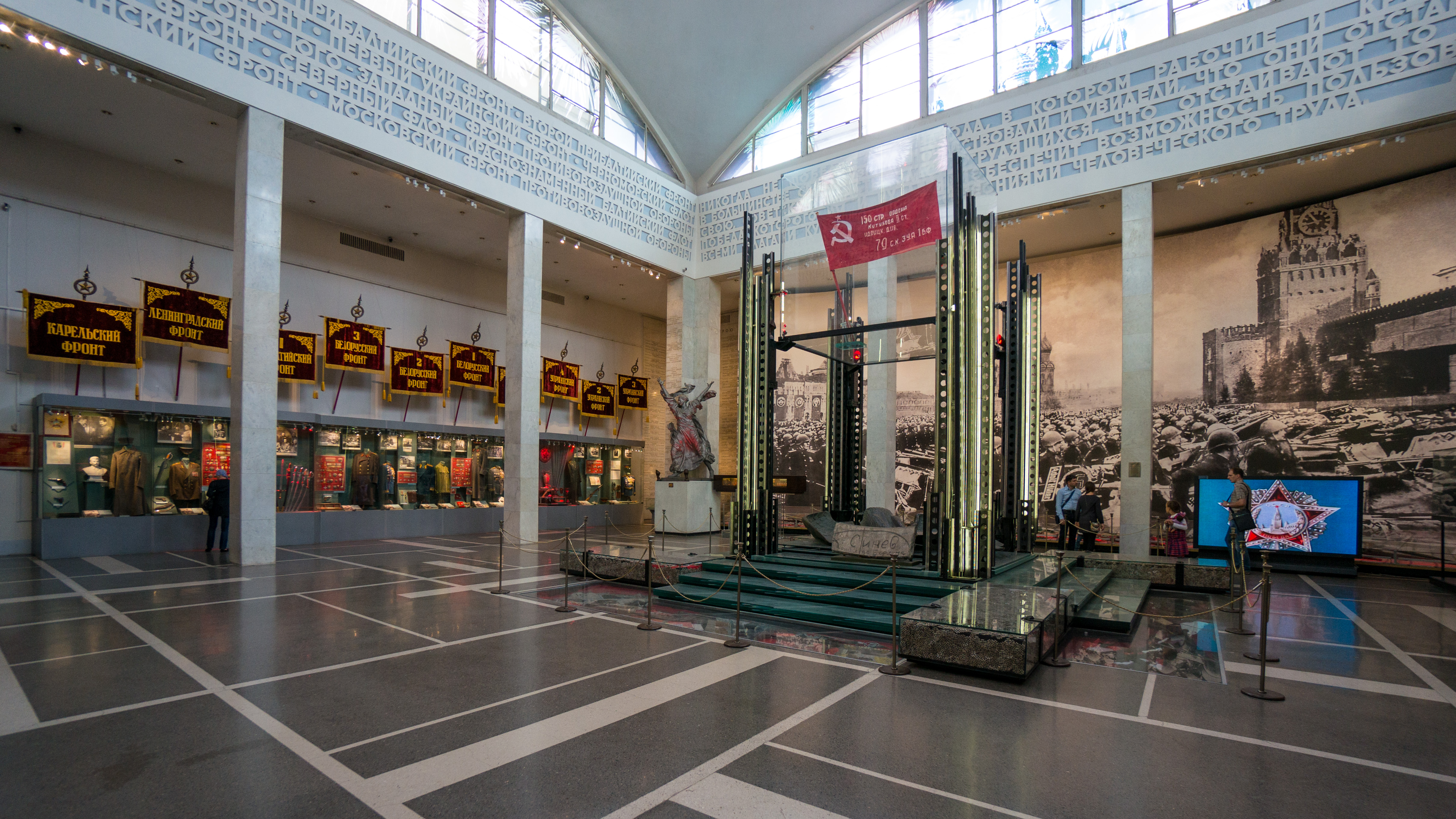
The original Victory Banner is saved in the Central Museum of the Armed Forces, Moscow

The origin of the banner comes from the report of the commander of the 3rd assault army to the head of political administration of The Red Army about the fight for Reichstag and placing the Victory Banner on it, dated 2 July 1945:

The Commander of the 1st Byelorussian Front Marshal of Soviet Union comrade Zhukov ordered the troops of the 3rd Shock Army to headily enter Berlin, to secure the downtown and Reichstag and to place the Victory Banner on it. <...>

Having defeated the last enemy strongholds the troops of the army entered Berlin at 6:00 o'clock in the evening on the 21st of April 1945. <...>

After seizing the downtown the troops of the 3rd assault army penetrated the neighborhood of the Reichstag at the end of 29 of April 1945..

On the 30th of April with the sunrise they started the massive assault on the Reichstag. <...>

On the 30th of April 1945 at 14:25 (2:25 pm) the soldiers of Lieutenant Sorokin's group fought their way to the roof and reached the dome. The courageous warriors - ordinary soldier Grigorij Bulatov, Komsomol party organizer Viktor Pravotorov and partyless Senior Sergeant Ivan Lysenko, Stepan Oreshko have erected a banner, the proud flag of the Soviet Union over the German parliamentary building, a symbol of our Great Victory.

The banner hoisted over the Reichstag, burned and shot through with bullets, flew victoriously over a defeated Berlin. <...>

— Vasily Kuznetsov and Andrei Litvinov, "Chapter III. «Banner above Reichtag»". Russian archive: Second World War: B. 15 (4-5). Fight for Berlin (Red Army in the defeated Germany). Moscow: Terra. 1995.

== Status in certain countries ==
=== Belarus ===
By decree of President Alexander Lukashenko on 6 May 1995, a duplicate of the Victory Banner was issued for duties on 9 May, 23 February and 3 July. The Flag of the USSR also holds an equivalent status. In 2011, Russia presented Belarus with one of the official copies of the Victory Banner, being kept at the Belarusian Great Patriotic War Museum.

=== Donetsk and Luhansk People's Republics ===
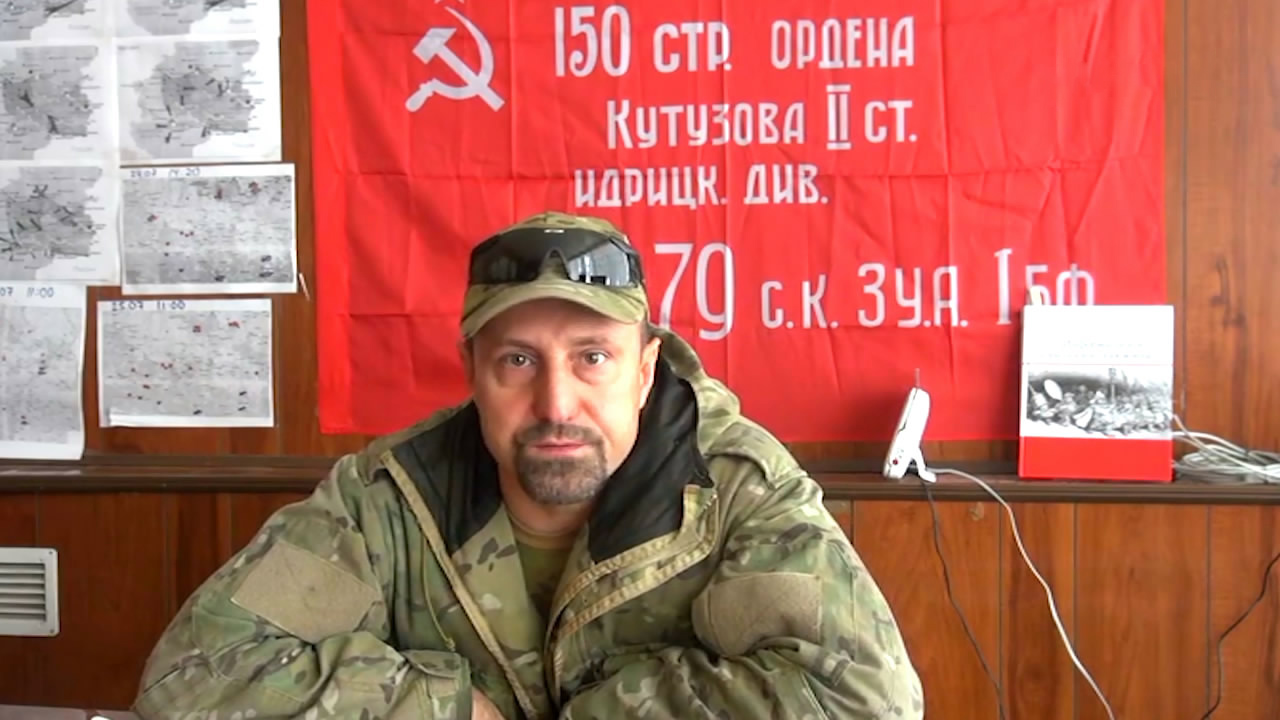
Alexander Khodakovsky holding a press conference in front of the Victory Banner

In the self-proclaimed separatist Donetsk People's Republic and Luhansk People's Republic on Victory Day, the Banner of Victory is utilized during military parades. In 2018, the parliaments of the DPR and LPR adopted laws "On the Banner of Victory", which established the status and legal basis for the use of copies of the Banner of Victory in the republics.

=== Kazakhstan ===
On 21 April 2010, in the Hall of Fame of the Central Museum of the Great Patriotic War in Moscow, a ceremony where a copy of the Victory Banner was handed over to the Chief of Staff of the Administrative Department of the President of Kazakhstan. This copy is kept in the Museum of Nursultan Nazarbayev. The welcoming of the banner took place on 1 May in the Park of 28 Panfilov Guardsmen in Almaty. On 6 May 2015, accompanied by a guard of honor, an exact copy of the Victory Banner, made by Russian craftsmen, was transferred to the National Archives of Kazakhstan. Later on 12 June 2015, Russia handed over another copy to the Ministry of Defense of Kazakhstan. The banner was transferred for storage to the newly opened Museum of Arms and Military Equipment of the Armed Forces of Kazakhstan in Astana. On 23 December 2015, prior to the meeting of the Council of Ministers of Defense of the CIS, Russian Defense Minister Sergei Shoigu handed over another copy of the Victory Banner to the Kazakh Minister of Defense Imangali Tasmagambetov.

=== Transnistria ===
On 21 October 2009, the self-proclaimed separatist Supreme Council of Transnistria adopted a law on equating the Victory Banner with the Transnistrian Flag. In 2014, at the Memorial of Glory in Tiraspol, an official copy of the Victory Banner was handed over to Transnistria from Russia.

=== Ukraine ===
On 21 April 2011, the Verkhovna Rada of Ukraine adopted a law which was signed by President Viktor Yanukovych that established a procedure for the official use of the Victory Banner, specifically at the Tomb of the Unknown Soldier and the Monument to the Unknown Sailor. In June of that year, the Constitutional Court of Ukraine found this law unconstitutional. On 9 April 2015, the Verkhovna Rada adopted a new law which removed all mention of the Victory Banner.

After the 2022 Russian invasion of Ukraine, Russian forces displayed the flag in numerous occupied locations, including government buildings. This was linked to both the upcoming Soviet-Russian Victory Day holiday on 9 May, as well as other forms of Soviet imagery used by Russian troops during the war as part of renewed Soviet nationalism under president Putin.

== Events with the banner ==
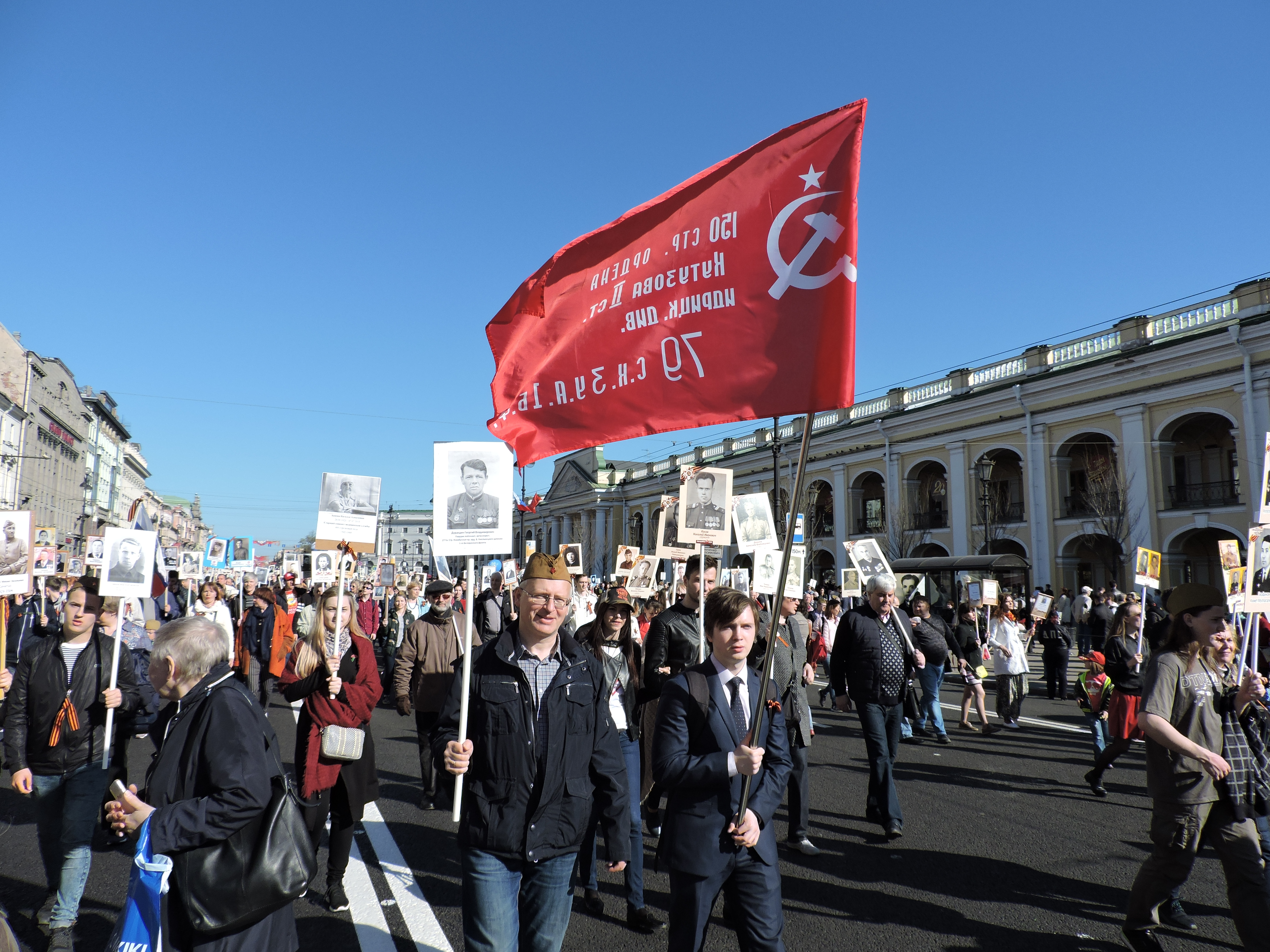
2018 Immortal Regiment participants march with a Soviet Victory Banner in Saint Petersburg

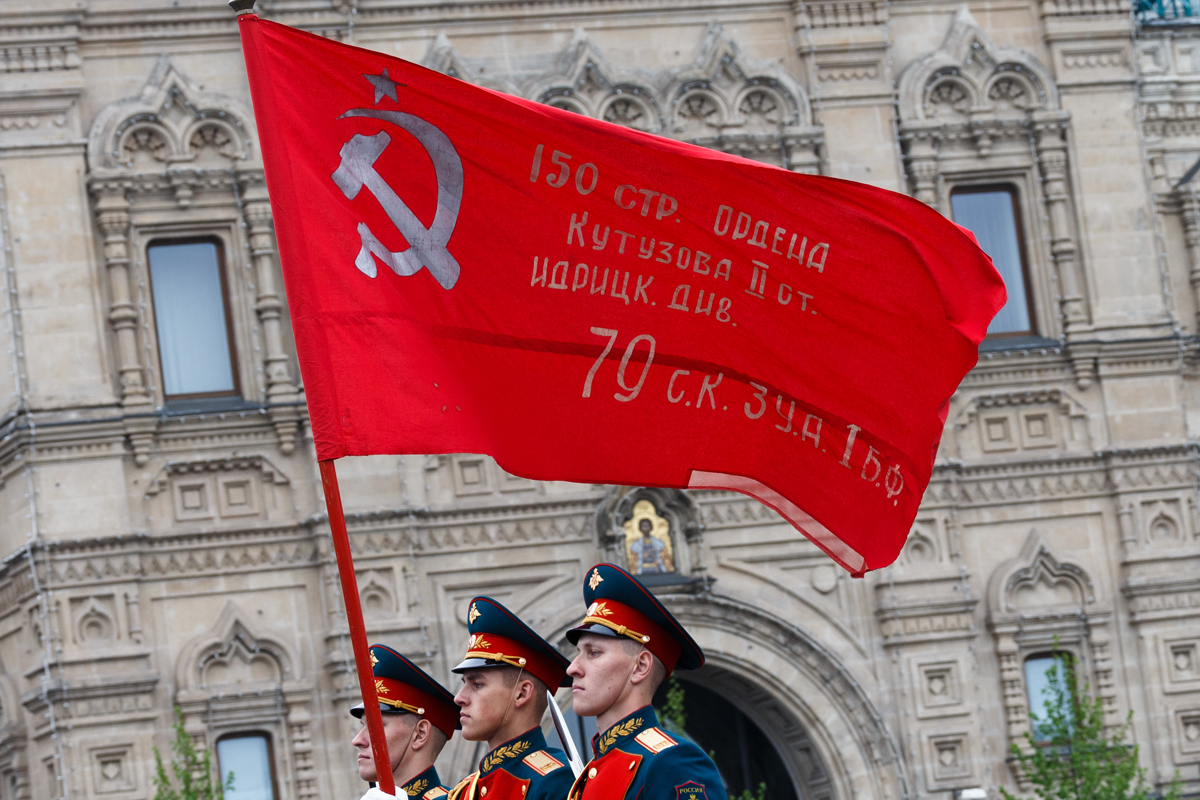
During the 2019 Moscow Victory Day Parade

Video of a waving Victory Banner on Sparrow Hills, Moscow

=== Military parades ===
A planned part of the Moscow Victory Parade of 1945 was supposed to be the march of the Victory Banner, which was delivered to Moscow from Berlin on 20 June and was supposed to begin the procession of troops on 24 June. Despite this, the weak drill training of Yegorov, Kantaria and Stepan Neustroev forced Marshal Georgy Zhukov to not go ahead with this portion of the parade. On May 9, during Victory Day parade in Moscow, a copy of Victory Banner #5 is carried immediately behind the Russian flag by members of the Moscow Commandant's Regiment Honor and Colors Guards. (In 2015 the order was reversed.) During the Independence Day Parade and the Victory Parade in Minsk, the color guard consisting of the Flag of Belarus, the Victory Banner and the Flag of the USSR are the first to march in the parade. The Victory Banner was brought to Kyiv from Moscow in October 2004 to take part in the parade in honor of the 60th Anniversary of the Liberation of Ukraine. This is the first instance of Russia sending the banner to a former Soviet Republic. In 2015, the banner was brought to Astana (the capital of Kazakhstan) to be trooped through Kazakh Eli Square by personnel of the Aibyn Presidential Regiment in the Defender of the Fatherland Day parade on 7 May. In 2020, during the first Victory Parade held in Ashgabat, the Banner was brought from Russia to be trooped on the square near the Halk Hakydasy Memorial Complex.

=== Other uses ===
On 9 May 2017, the largest copy of the Victory Banner measuring 60 by 25 meters was deployed on Great National Assembly Square in the Moldovan capital of Chișinău. The banner was sewn at a local factory over a period of two weeks. In 2020, sailors of the Russian Northern Fleet raised the banner over distant parts of the Russian Arctic.

== In philately ==
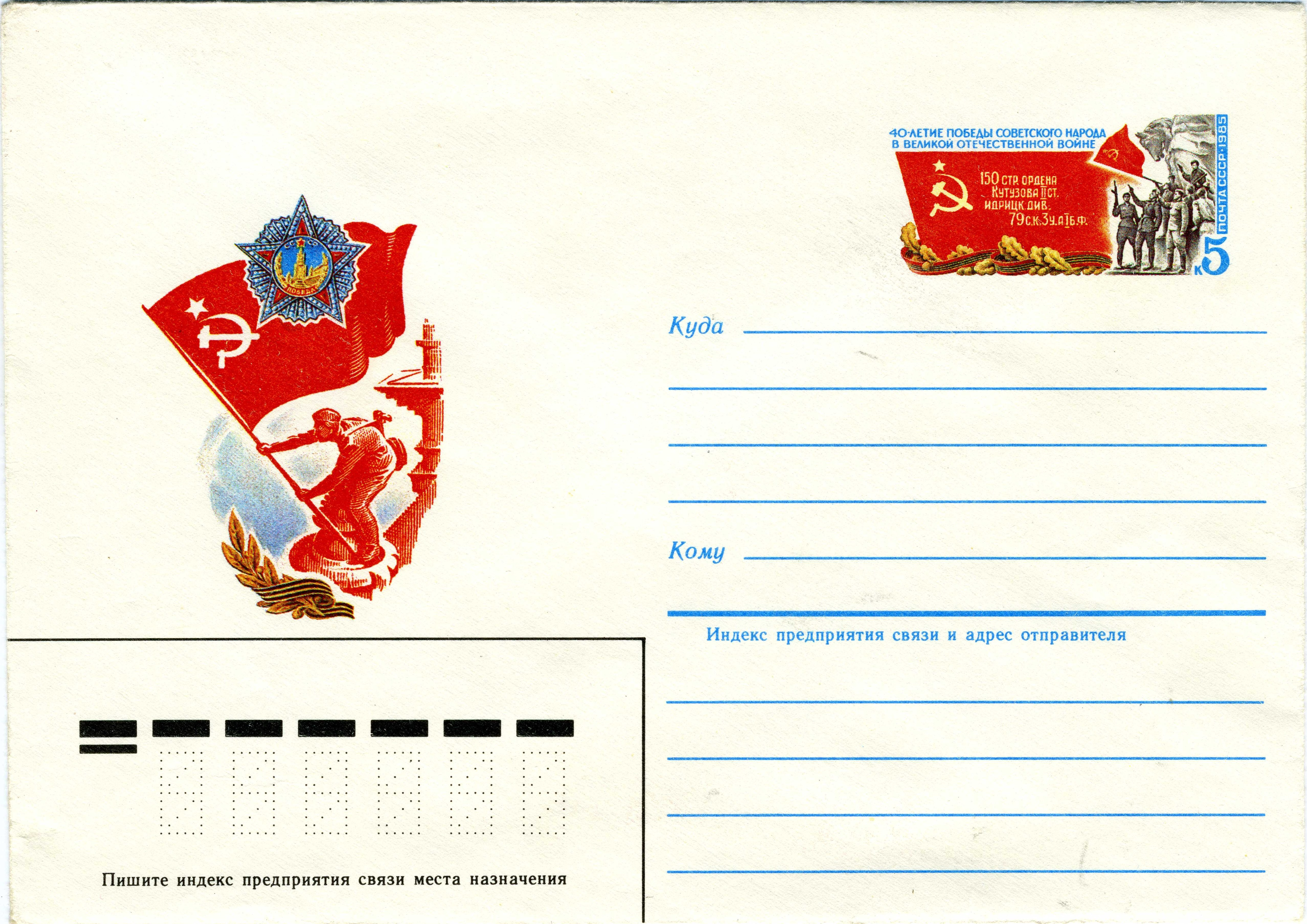
Soviet postcard, 1985

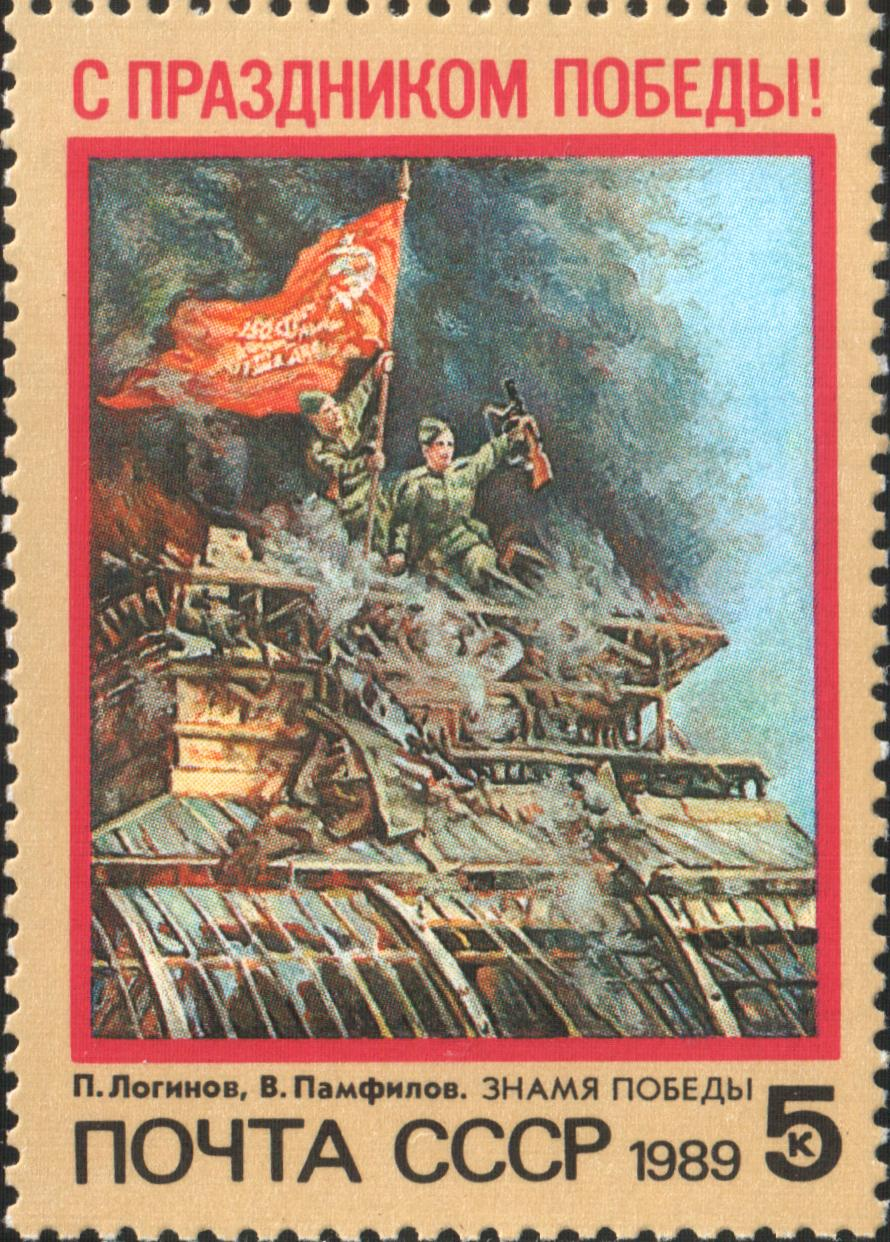
Soviet stamp, 1989

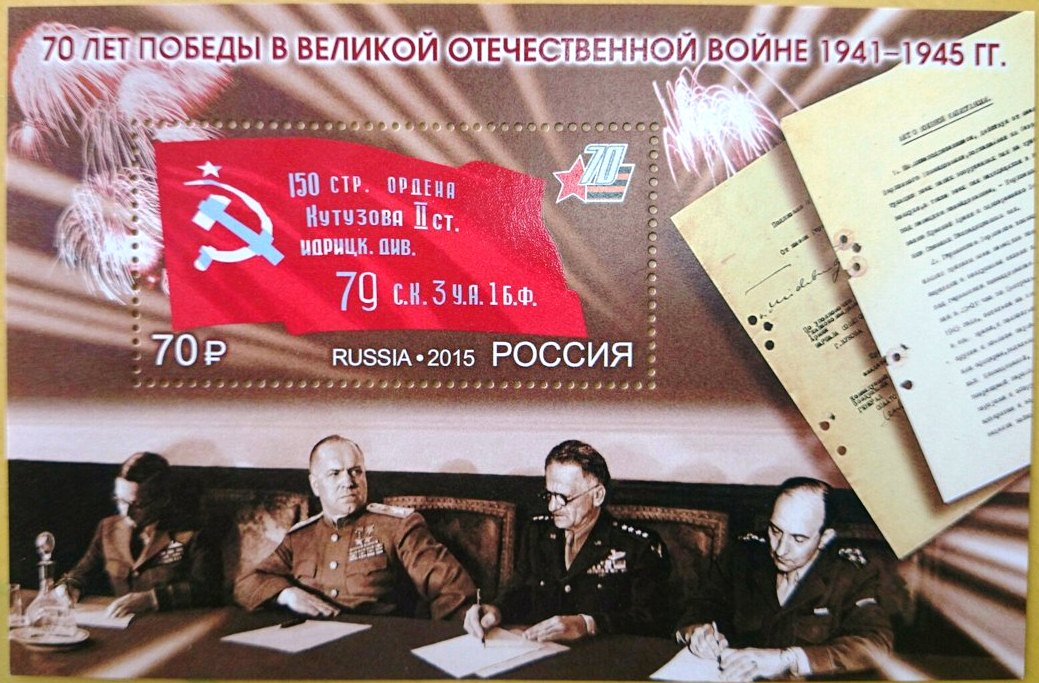
Russian stamp, 2015

== See also ==
- Order of Victory
- Victory Day
- Raising a Flag over the Reichstag
