= 150th Guards Motor Rifle Division =

Russian Ground Forces formation

- 150-я гвардейская мотострелковая Идрицко-Берлинская ордена Кутузова дивизия
- Great emblem of the 150th Motor Rifle Division
- Active: September 1939 – December 1946; December 2016 – present
- Country: Soviet Union (1939–1946); Russia (2016–)
- Branch: Red Army; Russian Ground Forces
- Type: Division
- Role: Mechanized infantry
- Part of: Southern Military District; 8th Guards Combined Arms Army
- Garrison/HQ: Novocherkassk
- Nickname: Berlin-Idritskaya
- Engagements: World War II; Battle of Taipale; Second Battle of Kharkov; Battle of Stalingrad; Battle of Berlin; Battle in Berlin; Russo-Ukrainian War; Invasion of Ukraine; Siege of Mariupol; Battle of Marinka; Pokrovsk offensive; Battle of Kurakhove; Battle of Toretsk
- Decorations: Order of Kutuzov, 2nd Class
- Battle honours: Guards

Commanders
- Current commander: Major General Vitaly Terekhin

Insignia
- Division SSI

The 150th Guards Motor Rifle Berlin-Idritsa Order of Kutuzov Division (Russian: 150-я гвардейская мотострелковая Идрицко-Берлинская ордена Кутузова дивизия) of the Russian Ground Forces is a motorized rifle division that was re-instituted in 2016. It is part of the 8th Guards Combined Arms Army, which was reformed in 2017, in the Southern Military District.

Its Red Army predecessor fought on the Eastern Front of World War II from 1941 to 1945. It gained fame when its soldiers raised the Soviet flag over the Reichstag on May 2, 1945. The nickname ‘Idritskaya’ was given to the Soviet division on July 23, 1944, by the order № 207 for its heroic battle in the town of Idritsa. The division fought at Schneidemühl and Berlin.

== History ==
The division was formed three times, being initially established at Vyazma in September 1939. As part of the 3rd Army's 3rd Rifle Corps, the division took part in the Soviet Invasion of Poland.

Force Composition

- 469th Rifle Regiment
- 674th Rifle Regiment
- 756th Rifle Regiment
- 328th Light Artillery Regiment
- 418th Howitzer Regiment

Operating as part of the 9th Army on 22 June 1941, then, after the Second Battle of Kharkov, was wiped out at Izyum in May 1942.

=== 2nd Formation ===
The division was reformed at Turga in the Siberian Military District on July 23, 1942, based on the 1st Siberian Volunteer Division. The unit was made up of over 10,000 men from Siberian factories and the Kuzbass coal fields and had a cadre of 1,460 combat veterans. By September 1 it had enlisted 13,754 personnel, 43.8 percent of whom were Communist Party members or Komsomols. Within two weeks it was assigned to the 6th "Siberian Volunteer" Rifle Corps and began moving by rail to camps near Moscow where it received the last of its support troops and transport. On September 30, the 150th set out on a 170km road march to join the 22nd Army near Belyi, part of the Kalinin Front.

During the Second Rzhev-Sychevka Offensive (Operation Mars) the 150th Division and the 6th Rifle Corps were referred to as "Stalin" units and were regarded as an elite force. On January 6, 1943, the division was pulled from the line and moved by rail to the Velikiye Luki area, where it served in the 5th Guards Rifle Corps during the last few days of the battle for that city, then on the 25th staged an assault crossing of the Lovat and Loknya Rivers. By the middle of February it was back in 6th Corps in 22nd Army. Over the next two months it fought in the Kholm area, pinning down the German forces evacuating from the Demyansk Pocket. On April 16 the Supreme High Command recognized the service of the 6th "Siberian Volunteer" Rifle Corps by re-designating it as the 19th Guards Rifle Corps, and three days later the 150th became the second formation of the 22nd Guards Rifle Division.

=== 3rd Formation ===
"Victory Banner #5" was raised just below a statue on the roof of the Reichstag building. The flag reads, "150th Rifle, Order of Kutuzov 2nd class, 'Idritskaya' Division, 79th Rifle Corps, 3rd Shock Army, 1st Belorussian Front."

It was then re-created for the third time in September 1943. When formed for the third time, it was composed of the 127th, 144th, and 151st brigades. Initially, this division fell under the command of the 34th Army. But during some time in early 1944, it was transferred to the 6th Guards Army, and then finally it was assigned to the 79th Rifle Corps of the 3rd Shock Army, of the 1st Belorussian Front, under which it would stay on the offensive all the way from Nevel, Pskov Oblast to Berlin.

On April 22, 1945, when victory for the Soviet Army was near, an order from the Military Council of the 3rd Shock Army designated the 150th Division to be one of 9 divisions to receive a special banner solely for the purpose of raising it over the Reichstag as a sign of the Soviet victory. After crossing the Moltke Bridge on the River Spree on April 29, the 756th and 674th Rifle Regiments of the 150th Division captured the Interior Ministry Building, stormed the barriers in the Königsplatz and on the 30th, breached the Reichstag. The victory banner was hoisted on the roof at 10:30 in the evening, but there was no chance to take a picture. By 2 May, the Germans defending the building were defeated and the Charlottenburger Chaussee to the south became the border between elements of the 3rd Shock Army and 8th Guards Army. Red Army photographer Yevgeny Khaldei then photographed soldiers of the 756th Rifle Regiment hoisting the national flag of the Soviet Union on the roof of the Reichstag, becoming one of the most iconic images of the war.

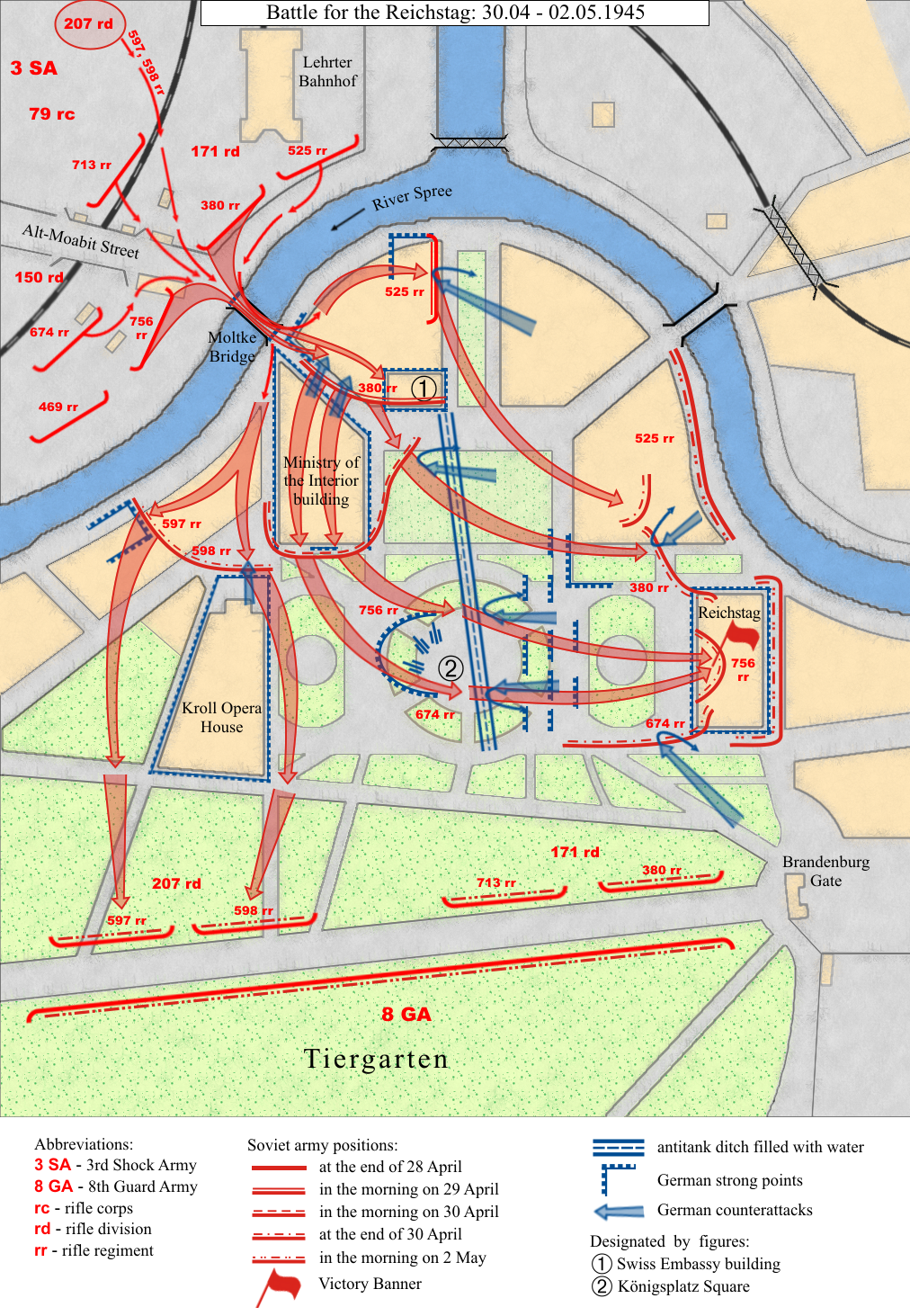
Movements of the 150th, 171st and 207th Rifle Divisions through central Berlin, April 28 to May 2

On April 26, 1945, for its earlier heroic overnight victory at lake Woświn east of Stargard, 150th Rifle Division was awarded the Order of Kutuzov, second degree.

In December 1946 the division was disbanded in the Group of Soviet Forces in Germany.

15 personnel were awarded the Gold Star Medal as Heroes of the Soviet Union, while a veteran of the unit was given the Gold Star Medal as a Hero of Ukraine in 2005.

== Reactivation (2016) ==
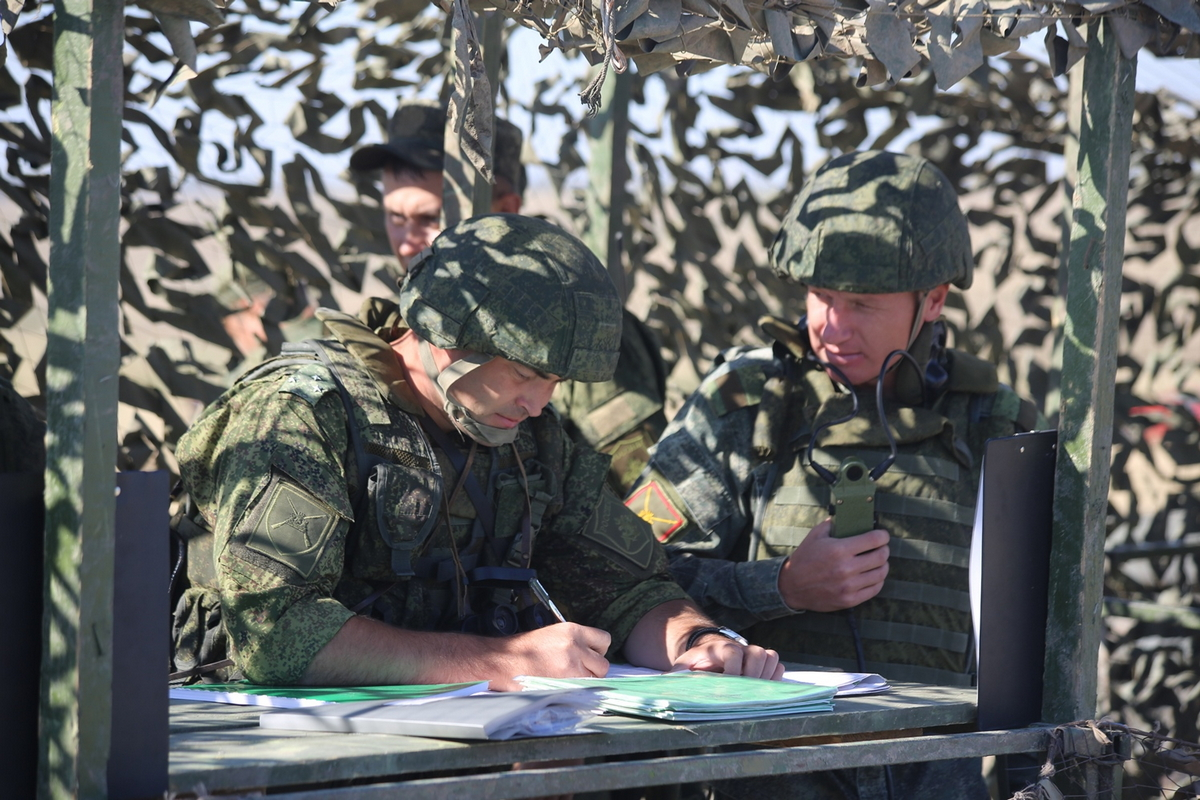
Command staff exercise of the 150th Rifle Division, August 2019

The unit was re-established in December 2016 in Rostov Oblast as a full motor rifle division with its division HQ scheduled to open in Novocherkassk and was meant to become part of the 8th Combined Arms Army, as part of the broader structural reform of the Russian armed forces.

The division was equipped with T-90A MBTs, BMP-3 IFVs and BTR-80 APCs, and contains as-yet undisclosed infantry, armour, artillery and SAM regiments, as well as communications, logistics and intelligence units. The division's re-formation was completed by 2017. In 2018, Russian president Putin signed decrees naming some of the division's units after localities in Belarus, Poland, and Ukraine.

On the eve of Victory Day in 2019, the commander of the Southern Military District, Colonel General Aleksandr Dvornikov, presented a copy of the Victory Banner to the commander of the 150th Rifle Division. On 1 December 2019, the 103rd motorized rifle regiment was formed as part of the division. On 18 January 2020, the regiment was presented its renewed Colour of the 2008/2010 pattern. Creation of the new unit completed the formation of the 150th motorized rifle division.

The division has been heavily engaged in the invasion of Ukraine with its commander, Major General Oleg Mityaev, reportedly killed in action around March 18, 2022.

On August 5, 2024, by Decree of the President of the Russian Federation, the division was granted the honorary title "Guards" for the massive heroism and bravery, fortitude and courage shown by the personnel of the division in combat operations to protect the Fatherland and state interests in armed conflicts at home and abroad over the past 85 years.

== Organization (2020) ==
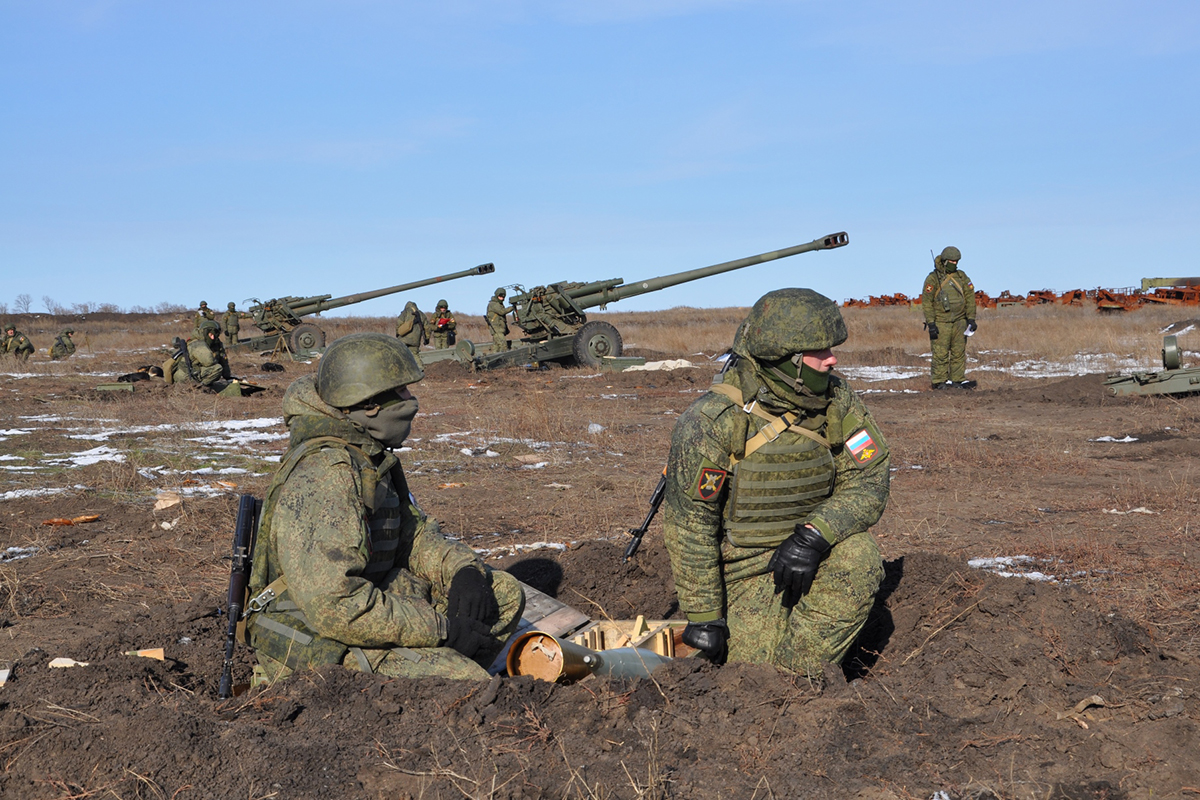
381st Guards Warsaw Artillery Regiment in 2018.

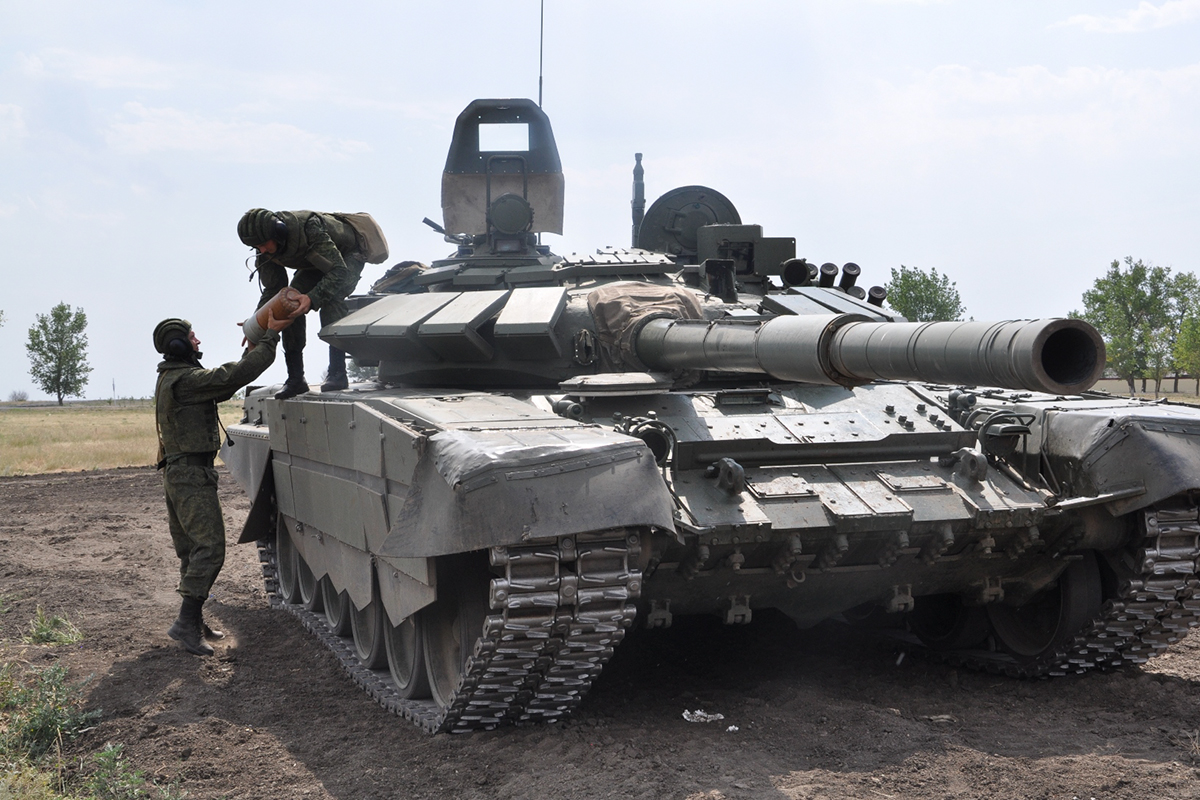
T-72B3 mod. 2016 of the 68th Guards Tank Regiment in 2018.

- Division HQ
  - 174th Reconnaissance Battalion
  - 258th Signal Battalion
  - 293rd Materiel Battalion
  - 539th Engineers Battalion
  - Anti-Tank Artillery Battalion
  - Medical Battalion
  - Electronic Warfare Company
  - UAV Company
  - NBC protection company
- 102nd Slonim-Pomeranian Guards Motorized Rifle Regiment
- 103rd Motorized Rifle Regiment
- 68th Guards Zhytomyr-Berlin Tank Regiment
- 163rd Guards Nizhyn Tank Regiment
- 381st Guards Warsaw Artillery Regiment
- 933rd Upper Dnipro Anti-Aircraft Missile Regiment
- "Afipsa" Storm Battalion

== Commanders ==
- Major-general Sergei Alekseyevich Kniazkov (1939–1940)
- Major-general Alexander Ivanovich Pastrevich (1940–1941)
- Major-general Daniil Grigorevich Egorov (1941–1942)
- Colonel Leonid Vasilyevich Yakovlev (September 1943 – April 1944)
- Major-general Vasily Shatilov (May 1944 – December 1946)
- Major-general Pyotr Bolgarev (2016–2018)
- Major-general Ruslan Musaevich Dzeitov (2018–2019)
- Major-general Vladimir Khazretovich Elkanov (2019–2020)
- Major-general Oleg Mityaev (2020–2023)
- Guards Major General Vitaly Valerievich Teryokhin (2023–present)

== See also ==
- List of Soviet Union divisions 1917–1945
- Victory Banner

== Sources ==
- Tsapayev, D.A.; et al. (2014). Великая Отечественная: Комдивы. Военный биографический словарь [The Great Patriotic War: Division Commanders. Military Biographical Dictionary] (in Russian). Vol. 5. Moscow: Kuchkovo Pole. ISBN 978-5-9950-0457-8.
- Шатилов В.М. Знамя над рейхстагом. 3-е изд. М.: Воениздат, 1975;
- Наша газета
- http://samsv.narod.ru/Div/Sd/sd150/default.html
- https://informnapalm.org/en/myths-and-reality-behind-the-150th-division-russian-state-of-art-21st-century-armed-forces/
