= 3rd Shock Army =

Formation of the Soviet Red Army (1941–1954)

3rd Shock Army (1941–1954) 3rd Combined Arms Army (1954–1974) 3rd 'Red Banner' Combined Arms Army (1974–1992)
- Active: 25 December 1941–1992
- Country: Soviet Union
- Branch: Soviet Army
- Type: Shock troops
- Size: Varied over time
- Part of: Military District
- Engagements: World War II; Great Patriotic War; Toropets–Kholm Offensive; Velikiye Luki Offensive Operation; Battle of Nevel; Baltic Offensive; Vistula–Oder Offensive; East Pomeranian Offensive; Battle of Berlin; Battle of Seelow Heights

The 3rd Shock Army (Russian: Третья ударная армия) was a field army of the Red Army formed during the Second World War. The "Shock" armies were created with the specific structure to engage and destroy significant enemy forces, and were reinforced with more armoured and artillery assets than other combined arms armies. Where necessary the Shock armies were reinforced with mechanised, tank, and cavalry units. During the Second World War, some Shock armies included armoured trains and air–sled equipped units.

== Campaign history ==
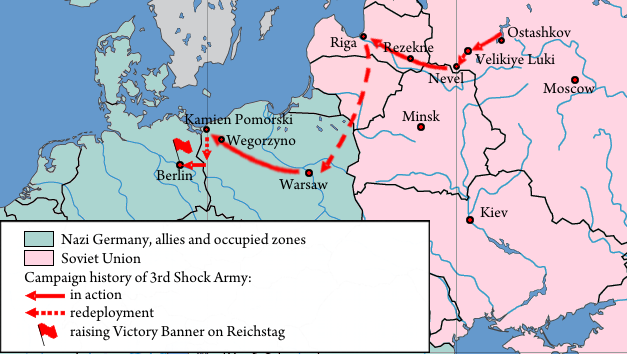
Campaign history

The Army was created from the headquarters of 60th Army (1st formation), which had been formed in the Moscow Military District in November 1941. Initially, the 60th Army comprised the 334th, 336th, 358th, and 360th Rifle Divisions and the 11th Cavalry Division, and was tasked with fortifying the left bank of the Volga River from Unza to Kosmodemiansk. The rifle divisions were reallocated to the 4th Shock Army, which was forming up at the same time nearby.

The headquarters of 60th Army was converted into the headquarters of 3rd Shock Army on 25 December 1941, under the command of General Lieutenant Maksim Purkayev. On 1 January 1942, the Army was composed of the 23rd, 33rd and 257th Rifle Divisions, 20th, 27th, 31st, 42nd, 45th and 54th Separate Rifle Brigades, and a number of artillery and other units. The Shock Army was also singled out by having its own aviation units attached because of its intended use. These units included the 163rd Fighter Aviation Regiment (Yak–1), 728th Fighter Aviation Regiment (Polikarpov I–16), 128th Short–range Bombing Regiment (Pe–2), 621st Aviation Regiment (R–5) and 663rd Aviation Regiment (Po–2). However, by the beginning of April, this was reduced to one light–bombing regiment (12 Po–2 aircraft) and three fighter regiments with 12 Polikarpov I–16s in total.

It was initially a part of the Moscow Defense Zone in the Reserve of the Supreme High Command (RVGK). However, 3rd Shock was soon allocated to join the North–Western Front on 27 December 1941 as part of the Moscow counteroffensive. Matters were not improved by the lack of supplies, aggravated by horrible communications; the assault troops did not get a full meal before the offensive due to food shortages.

However, after a few days the offensive – the Toropets–Kholm operation – began to roll forward, with 3rd Shock approaching Kholm, but it was getting dangerously separated from its neighbour, 4th Shock Army. By mid January, 3rd Shock had surrounded Kholm and its forward units had cut the road between Kholm and Toropets. Kholm itself was surrounded on 22 January, though it was never taken and was relieved on 5 May. With some success in view, Stalin widened the operation's goals, and with a Stavka directive on 19 January directed 3rd Shock, as part of the wider operation, to head for Velikie Luki, and then to Vitebsk, Orsha, and Smolensk. Two days later, 3rd Shock was shifted from the North–Western Front to the Kalinin Front. However, the forces available were becoming dangerously thin for the enormous tasks that Stalin was setting them. The Army got no further than Velikie Luki, and was unable to take the town in the face of stiffening German resistance and shortages of food, fuel, and ammunition. Velikie Luki was finally taken by the Kalinin Front on 17 January 1943.

The Army's next major effort was as part of the Nevel–Gorodok offensive operation in October–November 1943. Nevel was taken at the start of the offensive on 6 October 1943. The Kalinin Front had been renamed Baltic Front on 13 October 1943, and under Yeremenko, used two armies on the left flank, the 43rd and 49th, to distract the Germans' attention from his main blow, from the 3rd and 4th Shock Armies against Third Panzer Army in the Nevel area. This would see the Soviets astride the routes leading to the rear of Army Group North and cut vital rail links.

Following the Starorussa–Novorzhev offensive operation (February 1944), the Army's next attack was as part of 2nd Baltic Front's July 1944 offensive: the Rezhitsa–Dvina offensive operation. Beginning on 10 July, 3rd Shock Army had reached the Velikaya River by 12 July, captured the bridges despite the demolition charges laid on them, and moved on to surround Idritsa, which was captured that same day. Five days later the Army liberated Sebezh after a deep outflanking movement. Rezhitsa (now Rēzekne, Latvia) was taken on 26 July 1944, with the help of the 10th Guards Army. The 2nd Baltic Front was now facing central Latvia, and on 2 August 1944 the armies were on the march again, with 3rd Shock tasked to move south of Lake Lubań and on to the south of Madon, but after the Soviet forces seized Krustpils, some heavy fighting followed with only limited success. 3rd Shock forced a passage over a tributary of the Dvina River, the Oger, on 19 August, but then had to fend off a strong German attack mounted by three divisions with air support. The Soviets slowly moved toward Riga, but the emphasis was shifted south, and the 2nd Baltic Front found itself playing a supporting role from early October as Bagramyan's First Baltic Front raced for the Baltic coastline itself to sever the remaining connection between the German forces in East Prussia and those in Latvia and Estonia. Riga fell on 13 October and the remaining German forces in the area were bottled up in the Courland area.

3rd Shock then took part in the blockade of the Courland pocket, and the first Soviet attacks started on 16 October. However, by the end of October, it was seen that despite some advances, there was little hope for full success, and the Army was shifted south. 3rd Shock became part of the 1st Belorussian Front from 31 December 1944. The Army was placed in the second echelon for the Warsaw–Poznań strategic offensive operation, attacking in the direction of Poznań under Zhukov's 1st Belorussian Front. It then took part in the Vistula–Oder Offensive between 12.1.1945 – 3.2.1945.

As the Army moved quickly across Poland in March 1945 during the Eastern–Pomeranian strategic offensive operation, it liberated a number of cities, including Vangerin and Labes on 3 March, and Frayenvalde and Regenvalde on 4 March 1945. The same day, in conjunction with the Polish 1st Army and the 1st Guards Tank Army, 3rd Shock entered Dramburg. A day later, 3rd Shock entered Gyultsov, and on 6 March the unit entered Kammin. On 7 March, 3rd Shock entered Shtepenitts, and liberated Gollnov together with troops of the 2nd Guards Tank Army.

The Army was in the second echelon of the 1st Belorussian Front in the Battle of Berlin.

In April 1945, the 3rd Shock Army (HQ Stendal) as part of the 1st Belorussian Front had the following major component formations and units:

- 7th Rifle Corps (146th, 265th, 364th Rifle Divisions)
- 9th Tank Corps (23rd, 95th, and 108th Tank Brigades and 8th Motor Rifle Brigade) (attached from front headquarters)
- 12th Guards Rifle Corps (23rd Guards, 52nd Guards, 33rd Rifle Divisions)
- 79th Rifle Corps (150th, 171st, 207th Rifle Divisions)
- 1203rd, 1728th and 1729th Separate self–propelled assault artillery regiments
- 136th Gun–Artillery Brigade
- 45th Antitank Brigade
- 25th Sapper Brigade
- 5th and 13th Pontoon Bridging Brigades

The Army took Pankow, a suburb of Berlin, on 23 April 1945. A week later, two regiments of the 150th Rifle Division, 79th Rifle Corps were responsible for erecting flags over the Reichstag on 30 April 1945, one of which was known as the Victory Banner. A future commander of the Army, V.I. Varennikov, would also command the honour guard of the Victory Banner. The Army's active service ended when fighting ceased in Berlin on 8 May 1945.

== World War II service ==
=== Campaigns and operations participation ===
- Winter Campaign of 1941–42 (Russian: Зимняя кампания 1941/42 г.) (5 December 1941 – 30 April 1942)
- Toropets–Kholm Offensive (9 January 1942 – 6 February 1942)
- Summer–Autumn Campaign (Russian: Летне–осенняя кампания 1942 г.) (1 May – 18 November 1942)
- Winter Campaign of 1942–43 (Russian: Зимняя кампания 1942–1943 гг.) (19 November 1942 – 3 March 1943)
- Velikie Luki offensive (November 1942 – January 1943)
- Summer–Autumn Campaign of 1943 (Russian: Летне–осенняя кампания 1943 г.) (1 July – 31 December 1943)
- Nevel'–Gorodok offensive operation (October– November 1943)
- Winter–Spring Campaign (Russian: Зимне–весенняя кампания 1944 г.) (1 January – 31 May 1944)
- Staraya Russa–Novorzhev Offensive (February 1944)
- Summer–Autumn Campaign of 1944 (Russian: Летне–осенняя кампания 1944 г.) (1 June – 31 December 1944)
- Rezhitsa–Dvinsk Offensive (10 July 1944 – 27 July 1944)
- Madona Offensive (1 August 1944 – 28 August 1944)
- Riga Offensive (1944) (14 September 1944 – 24 October 1944)
- Courland peninsula blockade (from October 1944 – 31 December 1944)
- Vistula–Oder Offensive (12 January – 2 February 1945)
- Berlin Offensive (16 April – 8 May 1945)
- Campaign in Europe during 1945 (Russian: Кампания в Европе 1945 г.) (1 January – 9 May 1945)

=== Notable service personnel ===
- Mikhail Budenkov: 3rd highest ranking sniper, Guards senior sergeant, sniper of 59th Guards Rifle Regiment (21st Guards Rifle Division, 3rd Shock Army, 2nd Baltic Front) (437 confirmed).
- Abukhadzhi Idrisov: 11th highest ranking sniper, senior sergeant, 1232nd Rifle Regiment (370th Rifle Division, 3rd Shock Army, 2nd Baltic Front) (349 confirmed).

=== Command staff ===
==== Commanders ====
- General Lieutenant M.A. Purkaev (December 1941 – August 1942)
- General Lieutenant Kuzma Galitsky (September 1942 – November 1943)
- General Colonel N.E. Chibisov (November 1943 – April 1944)
- General Lieutenant V.A. Yushkevich (April – August 1944)
- General Lieutenant M.N. Gerasimov (August – October 1944)
- General Lieutenant Nikolai Simoniak (October 1944 – March 1945)
- General Colonel V.I. Kuznetsov (March 1945 – end of the war)

==== Leaders of the Military Council ====
- Brigade Commissioner A.P. Riazanov (December 1941 – February 1943)
- General Lieutenant P.K. Ponomarenko (February – March 1943)
- General Major A.I. Litvinov (March 1943 – end of the war)

==== Chiefs of staff ====
- General Major A.P. Pokrovskiy (December 1941 – February 1942)
- General Major Mikhail Sharokhin (February – August 1942)
- General Major I.O. Yudintsev (August 1942 – March 1943)
- General Major M.M. Busarov (March May 1943)
- General Major F.A. Zuev (May October 1943)
- General Major Veniamin Beylin (October 1943 – August 1944)
- General Major from July 1945. General Lieutenant M.F. Bukshtynovich (August 1944 – end of the war).

== Service in Germany ==
The 3rd Shock Army stayed in Germany after the end of the war, becoming part of the Group of Soviet Forces in Germany. During the 1960s and early 1970s, the Army's divisions were equipped with T–62 and T–55 tanks.

The army kept the descriptive title "shock" until 1954, when it became the 3rd "Red Banner" Combined Arms Army (Russian: 3-я краснознаменная общевойсковая армия). Army headquarters was located in Magdeburg from January 1946.

There was an army reorganisation in June 1964 and a number of divisions were switched into and out of the army. It was awarded the Order of the Red Banner in 1974.

During the late 1970s, the divisions received T–64As, T–64Bs (one third of each battalion), and eventually T–64BVs with dynamic armour. In 1984, a decision was made to re–equip the formations with T–80BV variants (10th Guards Tank Division), replacing the T–64s, BMP–1/2 and variants, and various BTR variants.

In 1980 the army comprised three divisions: the 10th Guards Tank Division (Krampnitz, East Germany), the 47th Guards Tank Division (Hillersleben, East Germany), and the 207th Motor Rifle Division (Stendal, East Germany), plus a large number of supporting brigades, regiments, and battalions. In May 1983 it was reorganised, and the 207th Motor Rifle Division was transferred to the 2nd Guards Tank Army, and the 12th Guards Tank Division was attached in its place. To bring the army's total to four divisions, the 7th Guards Tank Division was attached from the 1st Guards Tank Army.

Thus the army had four divisions in 1988:

- 7th Guards Tank Division (Rosslau, East Germany)
- 10th Guards Tank Division (Altengrabow, East Germany)
- 12th Guards Tank Division (Neuruppin, East Germany)
- 47th Guards Tank Division (Hillersleben, East Germany)

During 1989–91, a past commanding officer of the Army (1969) V.I. Varennikov was the Commander in Chief of the Soviet Ground Forces. The Army was relocated from Germany during 1990–1991. Army headquarters was briefly sent to the Far East Military District, but then disbanded. The "out of Germany transfer" directive was issued 15 April 1991, but the Army did not leave until November 1991. The Army headquarters arrived in Khabarovsk in January 1992, but was disbanded in early March 1992.

=== 1988 order of battle ===
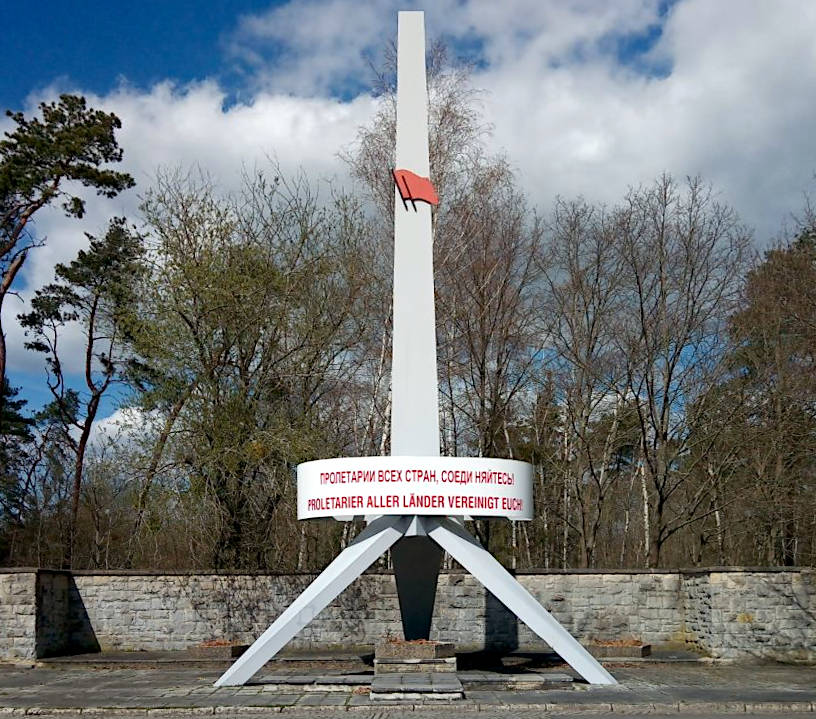
Monument in Roßlau

- 7th Guards Kiev–Berlin Tank Division (Roßlau) (disbanded 1990)
  - 55th Guards Vasilkovskiy Tank Regiment (Lutherstadt–Wittenberg)
  - 56th Guards Vasilkov Shepetovsk Tank Regiment (Zerbst)
  - 79th Guards Bobruiskiy Tank Regiment (Roßlau)
  - 40th Motor Rifle Regiment (Bernburg)
  - 670th Guards Motorised Artillery Regiment (Cochstedt)
  - 287th Guards Antiaircraft–missile Regiment (Roßlau)
  - 4th Separate Guards Reconnaissance Battalion (Quedlinburg–Quarmbeck)
  - 146th Separate Guards Communications Battalion (Roßlau)
  - 121st Separate Engineer Battalion (Roßlau)
  - 165th Separate Chemical Defence Battalion (Roßlau)
  - 183rd Separate Material Supply Battalion (Roßlau)
  - 58th Separate Equipment Maintenance and Recovery Battalion (Roßlau)
  - 186th Separate Medical Battalion (Dessau)
- 10th Guards Tank Ural Volunteer Division in the name of Marshal of Soviet Union R. A. Malinovsky (Altengrabow) (now at Boguchar in the Moscow Military District)
  - 61st Guards Sverdlovsk Tank Regiment (Altengrabow)
  - 62nd Guards Permian–Keletskiy Tank Regiment (Altengrabow)
  - 63rd Guards Chelyabinsk–Petrokovskiy Tank Regiment (Altengrabow)
  - 248th Guards Unechskiy Motor Rifle regiment (Schönebeck)
  - 744th Guards Ternopil Artillery Regiment (Altengrabow)
  - 359th Guards Lvov Anti–Aircraft Artillery Regiment (Altengrabow)
  - 7th Separate Guards Reconnaissance Battalion (Khalershtadt) later Altengrabow
  - 152nd Separate Communications Battalion (Altengrabow)
  - 131st Separate Guards Engineer Battalion (Magdeburg)
  - 127 Separate Chemical Defence Battalion (Altengrabow)
  - 1072nd Separate Material Supply Battalion (Altengrabow)
  - 60th Separate Equipment Maintenance and Recovery Battalion (Altengrabow)
  - 188th Separate Medical Battalion (Altengrabow)
- 12th Guards Prikarpattiya Berlin Tank Division (Neuruppin) (disbanded 1991)
  - 48th Guards Vapnyarsko–Varshavsky Tank Regiment (Neuruppin)
  - 332nd Guards Warsaw Red Banner Order of Alexander Nevsky Tank Regiment (Neuruppin)
  - 353rd Guards Vapnyarsko–Berlin Tank Regiment (Neuruppin)
  - 200th Guards Fastov Motor Rifle Regiment (Burg)
  - 117th Artillery Regiment (Mahlwinkel)
  - 933rd Upper Dnieper Anti–Aircraft Missile Regiment (Burg)
  - 18th Separate Guards Demblin Reconnaissance Battalion (Mahlwinkel)
  - 490th Separate Guards Communications Battalion (Neuruppin)
  - 136th Separate Guards Demblin Engineer Battalion (Neuruppin)
  - 129th Separate Chemical Defence Company (Neuruppin)
  - 1074th Separate Material Supply Battalion (Wulkow)
  - 64th Separate Equipment Maintenance and Recovery Battalion (Neuruppin)
  - 208th Separate Medical Battalion (Wulkow)
- 47th Guards Lower Dnieper Tank Division (Hillersleben)(withdrawn to Moscow Military District, amalgamated in the mid-1990s with the 31st Tank Division as the 3rd Motor Rifle Division)
  - 26th Feodosiya Tank Regiment (Hillersleben)
  - 153rd Smolensk Red Banner Order of Kutuzov Tank Regiment (Hillersleben)
  - 197th Guards Vapynar–Warsaw Tank Regiment (Halberstadt)
  - 245th Guards Gneznensky Red Banner Order of Suvorov Motor Rifle Regiment (Magdeburg)
  - 99th Guards Pomeranian Artillery Regiment (Magdeburg)
  - 1069th Order of the Red Star Anti–Aircraft Missile Regiment (Hillersleben)
  - 112th Separate Reconnaissance Battalion (Hillersleben)
  - 73rd Separate Guards Communications Battalion (Hillersleben)
  - 52nd Separate Guards Engineer Battalion (Hillersleben)
  - 1077th Separate Material Supply Battalion (Hillersleben)
  - 332nd Separate Chemical Defence Company (Hillersleben)
  - 65th Separate Equipment Maintenance and Recovery Battalion (Hillersleben)
  - 63rd Separate Medical Battalion (Hillersleben)

Formations and units subordinate to Army

- 792nd Separate Special Purpose Company (Spetsnaz) (Cochstedt)
- 115th Separate Tank Regiment (Quedlinburg)
- 899th Separate Air Assault Battalion (Burg)
- 232nd Separate Protection and Security Battalion (Magdeburg)
- 178th Separate Helicopter Regiment (Borstel)
- 440th Separate Helicopter Regiment (Borstel)
- 296th Separate Helicopter Squadron (Mahlwinkel)
- 36th Missile Brigade (Altengrabow)
- 448th Missile Brigade (Born)
- 49th Guards Anti–Aircraft Missile Brigade (Planken)
- 385th Guards Artillery Brigade (Planken)
- 451st Separate Anti–Tank Artillery Battalion (Magdeburg)
- 254th Separate Radio Engineering Regiment (Cochstedt)
- 15th Separate Radio Engineering Battalion (Magdeburg)
- 10th Separate Electronic Warfare Battalion (Stahnsdorf)
- 105th Separate Communications Regiment (Magdeburg)
- 457th Separate Radio Relay Cable Battalion (Magdeurg)
- 323rd Separate Engineer Battalion (Magdeburg)
- 36th Łódź Pontoon Bridge Regiment (Magdeburg)
- 2nd Separate Chemical Defence Battalion (Burg)
- 42nd Material Supply Brigade (Magdeburg)
- 298th Separate Equipment Maintenance and Recovery battalion (Schönebeck)
- 302nd Separate Equipment Maintenance and Recovery battalion (Schönebeck)
- 1408th Military Hospital (Magdeburg)
- 989th Military Hospital (Altengrabow)
- 20th Sanitary and Epidemiological Detachmend (Magdeburg)

=== Postwar Commanders ===
- Colonel General Vasily Kuznetsov (May 1945 – 5 October 1948)
- Colonel General Alexander Luchinsky (5 October 1948 – 11 April 1949)
- Lieutenant General Aleksandr Ryzhov (11 April 1949 – 4 December 1950)
- Lieutenant General Andrey Matveyevich Andreyev (4 December 1950 – 6 January 1954)
- Lieutenant General (Colonel General 8 August 1955) Dmitry Alexeyev (6 January 1954 – 29 June 1956)
- Major General (Lieutenant General 26 November 1956) Leonid Baukov (29 June 1956 – 11 December 1959)
- Lieutenant General Mikhail Frolenkov (11 December 1959 – 11 August 1962)
- Major General (Lieutenant General 13 April 1964) Alexander Klyukanov (11 August 1962 – 7 July 1965)
- Lieutenant General Semyon Kurkotkin (7 July 1965 – 18 August 1966)
- Lieutenant General Vasily Gorban (18 August 1966 – 29 August 1969)
- Major General (Lieutenant General 29 April 1970) Valentin Varennikov (29 August 1969 – 11 June 1971)
- Major General (Lieutenant General 8 November 1971) Yevgeny Touzakov (11 June 1971 – 24 January 1973)
- Major General (Lieutenant General 4 November 1973) Leonid Kuznetsov (24 January 1973 – 15 November 1974)
- Major General (Lieutenant General 13 February 1976) Pyotr Makarchuk (15 November 1974 – 21 July 1977)
- Lieutenant General Mikhail Sotskov (21 July 1977 – July 1979)
- Lieutenant General Viktor Skokov (July 1979 – December 1982)
- Lieutenant General Boris Pyankov (December 1982 – July 1985)
- Lieutenant General Viktor Chechevatov (July 1985 – 1987)
- Lieutenant General Alexey Mityukhin (1987–October 1991)
