= Idritsa =

Idritsa Идрица
- Work settlement
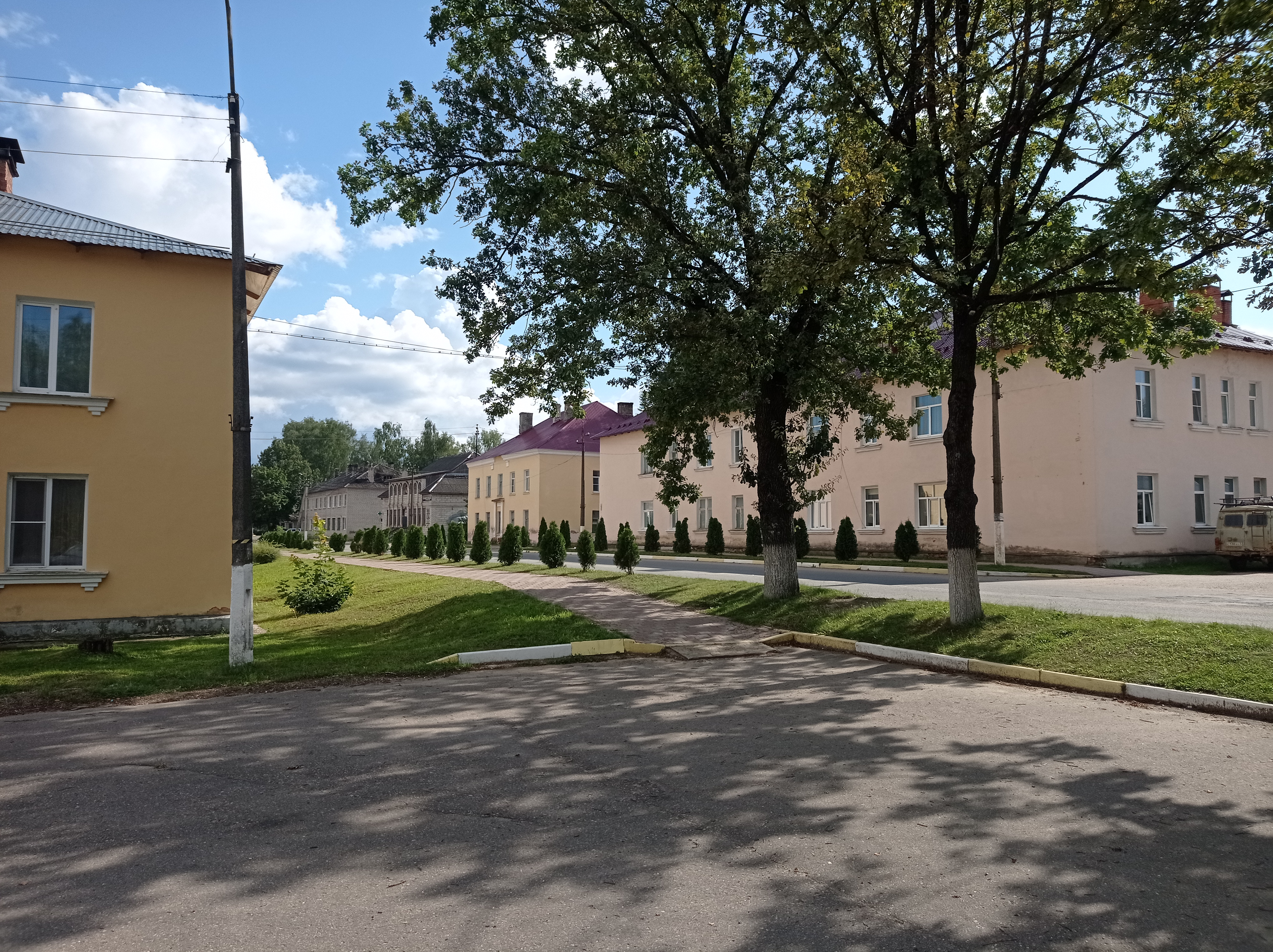
- Interactive map of Idritsa
- Location of Idritsa Idritsa (Pskov Oblast)
- Coordinates: 56°19′40″N 28°53′40″E
- Country: Russia
- Federal subject: Pskov Oblast
- Administrative district: Sebezhsky District
- Urban-type settlement status since: 1938

Population (2010 Census)
  - Total: 4,988
  - Estimate (2021): 3,992 (−20%)

Municipal status
  - Municipal district: Sebezhsky Municipal District
  - Urban settlement: Idritsa Urban Settlement
  - Capital of: Idritsa Urban Settlement
- Time zone: UTC+3 (MSK)
- Postal code: 182296
- OKTMO ID: 58654153051

Idritsa (Russian: Идрица) is an urban locality (a work settlement) in Sebezhsky District of Pskov Oblast, Russia, located on the Idritsa River, a left tributary of the Velikaya River. Municipally, it is incorporated as Idritsa Urban Settlement, one of the three urban settlements in the district. Population: 4,988 (2010 census); 5,784 (2002 census); 5,485 (1989 Soviet census).

== History ==
Idritsa was founded in the end of the 19th century as a settlement serving a railway station of Moscow-Vindava Railway. It belonged to Sebezhsky Uyezd of Pskov Governorate (before 1924 - of Vitebsk Governorate).

On August 1, 1927, the uyezds were abolished and Idritsky District was established, with the administrative center in Idritsa. It included parts of former Sebezhsky Uyezd. The governorates were abolished as well, and the district became a part of Velikiye Luki Okrug of Leningrad Oblast. On June 17, 1929, the district was transferred to Western Oblast. On July 23, 1930, the okrugs were also abolished, and the districts were directly subordinated to the oblast. On January 1, 1932 Idritsky District was abolished and split between Sebezhsky and Pustoshkinsky Districts. On June 1, 1936 it was re-established as a part of Velikiye Luki Okrug of Kalinin Oblast, one of the okrugs abutting the state boundaries of the Soviet Union. On May 4, 1938 the district was transferred to Opochka Okrug. In 1938, Idritsa was granted urban-type settlement status.

On February 5, 1941, Opochka Okrug was abolished. Between July 15, 1941 and July 12, 1944, Idritsa was occupied by German troops. In July 1944, the Soviet Army recaptured Idritsa after heavy fighting. On August 22, 1944, the district was transferred to newly established Velikiye Luki Oblast. On October 2, 1957 Velikiye Luki Oblast was abolished, and Idritsky District was transferred to Pskov Oblast. On October 3, 1959, Idritsky District was abolished and merged into Sebezhsky District.

== Economy ==
=== Industry ===
Idritsa has a flax production factory and a works producing electrotechnical equipment.

=== Transportation ===
The M9 highway which connects Moscow and Riga passes immediately north of Idritsa. There are also local roads.

Idritsa has a railway station on the railway connecting Moscow and Riga.

== Culture and recreation ==
Idritsa contains three cultural heritage monuments of local significance. All of them are monuments to soldiers fallen in World War II. The main square of Idritsa is named after the Victory Banner (Russian: Площадь Знамени Победы), because Idritsa was recaptured by 150th Rifle Division, which was named Idritsa after that, and the banner of which was raised on the Reichstag building.
