= XXXXI Corps =

41 Corps, 41st Corps, Forty First Corps, XLI Corps, or XXXXI Corps may refer to:

- 41st Army Corps (France)
- XXXXI Reserve Corps, German Empire
- XXXXI Panzer Corps, Wehrmacht, Germany
- 41st Army Corps (Russian Empire)
- 41st Guards Rifle Corps, Soviet Union
- 41st Yorkshire West Riding Rifle Volunteer Corps, United Kingdom

== See also ==
- List of military corps by number
- 41st Army (disambiguation)
- 41st Battalion (disambiguation)
- 41st Brigade (disambiguation)
- 41st Division (disambiguation)
- 41st Regiment (disambiguation)
- 41st Squadron (disambiguation)
- 41st (disambiguation)
