= 41st Cavalry =

41st Cavalry may refer to:

- 41st Cavalry Division, Soviet Union
- 41st Cavalry Regiment, British India
- 41st Virginia Cavalry Battalion, Confederate States Army
- 41st (Hampshire) Company, Imperial Yeomanry
- 20th Arkansas Infantry Regiment, officially redesignated the 41st Arkansas Infantry (Mounted), or colloquially the 41st Arkansas Cavalry

== See also ==
- 41st Division (disambiguation)
- 41st Brigade (disambiguation)
- 41st Regiment (disambiguation)
- 41st (disambiguation)
