= 41st =

41st is the ordinal form of the number 41. 41st or Forty-first may also refer to:

- A fraction, 1/41, equal to one of 41 equal parts

== Geography ==
- 41st meridian east, a line of longitude
- 41st meridian west, a line of longitude
- 41st parallel north, a circle of latitude
- 41st parallel south, a circle of latitude
- 41st Street (disambiguation)

== Military ==
- 41st Army (disambiguation)
- 41st Battalion (disambiguation)
- 41st Brigade (disambiguation)
- 41st Division (disambiguation)
- 41st Regiment (disambiguation)
- 41st Squadron (disambiguation)

== Other ==
- 41st century
- 41st century BC

== See also ==
- 41 (disambiguation)
- The Forty-First (disambiguation)
