= 41st Army =

41st Army may refer to:

- 41st Army (People's Republic of China), a former name of the 75th Group Army
- Forty-First Army (Japan) (1944–1945), a part of the Imperial Japanese Army
- 41st Guards Combined Arms Army, a field army of the Russian Ground Forces

== See also ==
- List of armies by number
- XLI Corps (disambiguation)
- 41st Division (disambiguation)
- 41st Brigade (disambiguation)
- 41st Regiment (disambiguation)
- 41st Battalion (disambiguation)
- 41st Squadron (disambiguation)
- 41st (disambiguation)
