= 119th Guards Rifle Division =

- Active: 1943–1946
- Country: Soviet Union
- Branch: Red Army (1943-46)
- Type: Division
- Role: Infantry
- Engagements: Battle of Nevel (1943); Pustoshka-Idritsa Offensive; Pskov-Ostrov Offensive; Baltic Offensive; Riga Offensive (1944); Memel Offensive Operation; Courland Pocket
- Decorations: Order of the Red Banner
- Battle honours: Rezhitsa

Commanders
- Notable commanders: Col. Sergei Ivanovich Aksyonov; Maj. Gen. Pavel Mendelevich Shafarenko; Maj. Gen. Ivan Vladimirovich Gribov; Col. Andrian Maksimovich Ilyin; Col. Anatolii Ivanovich Kolobutin

The 119th Guards Rifle Division was formed as an elite infantry division of the Red Army in September 1943, based on the 11th Guards Naval Rifle Brigade and the 15th Guards Naval Rifle Brigade and was one of a small series of Guards divisions formed on a similar basis. Although the two brigades had distinguished themselves in the fighting south of Stalingrad as part of 64th Army they were moved to Northwestern Front in the spring of 1943 before being reorganized. After serving briefly in 22nd Army the division was moved to reinforce the 3rd Shock Army within the large salient that Army had created behind German lines after a breakthrough at Nevel in October. In the following months it fought both to expand the salient and defend it against German counterattacks in a highly complex situation. In January 1944 it was transferred to the 7th Guards Rifle Corps of 10th Guards Army, still in the Nevel region, after which it advanced toward the Panther Line south of Lake Peipus. During operations in the Baltic states that summer and autumn the 119th Guards was awarded both a battle honor and the Order of the Red Banner for its operations in Latvia. In March 1945 it joined the Kurland Group of Forces of Leningrad Front on the Baltic coast containing the German forces encircled in northwest Latvia. Following the German surrender it was moved to Estonia where it was disbanded in 1946.

== Formation ==
By mid-1943 most of the Red Army's remaining rifle brigades were being amalgamated into rifle divisions as experience had shown this was a more efficient use of manpower.

=== 66th Naval Rifle Brigade ===
This brigade was formed from October to November 1941 in the Volga Military District, with a cadre from the Pacific Fleet and the Amur Military Flotilla. In December it was assigned to the reserves of Karelian Front and later to the 32nd Army of that Front. In June 1942 it was moved to the Reserve of the Supreme High Command and joined 1st Reserve Army which soon was redesignated as 64th Army west of Stalingrad.

In this Army it joined the 154th Naval Rifle Brigade (below) and the two served closely through most of the battle of Stalingrad. The 66th NRB was originally positioned west of the Don River south of its junction with the Chir near Nizhne-Chirskaia but was forced to retreat to the east bank by July 27 after suffering up to 50 percent losses. In the face of the advance of 4th Panzer Army south of the city in early August the 64th Army took up a defense along a line from Logovskii on the Don to Tinguta Station on August 12 with the 66th along the Myshkova River. This proved ineffective when the offensive was renewed on August 20. On the night of August 30 the brigade withdrew to the Erik River with the 157th Rifle Division but by September 2 the two units were fighting in encirclement. Orders arrived from Stalingrad Front authorizing a further withdrawal to the Peschanka line.

The battle for the city itself had begun in the third week of August but 64th Army was still attempting to guard the southern approaches. After Elkhi was lost on September 4 the 66th NRB was designated for a counterattack, but this did not succeed. The fighting on the approaches reached its climax on September 12; at this time it was holding the Army's left flank with the 154th NRB and the 36th Guards Rifle Division to the boundary with 57th Army and refitting. Its combat strength on September 10 is given as 1,134 men. By the beginning of October the brigade was in the Beketovka bridgehead south of Stalingrad and went over to the attack at 0430 hours on October 2 with five rifle divisions on an 8km-wide sector in an effort to break through to the isolated 62nd Army but made no significant gains and the effort was called off on October 4.

=== 154th Naval Rifle Brigade ===
The 154th Naval was formed in early December 1941 at Moscow in the Moscow Military District, based on recruits from the Moscow Naval School and originally designated as 1st Moscow Separate Naval Group. By the beginning of January 1942 it was assigned to the Moscow Defense Zone and on February 5 was reassigned to Northwestern Front. It marched some 250km through heavy snow to reach the Demyansk area where it took part in the fighting that cut off the German II Army Corps in a pocket. In June the brigade was pulled out of Front reserves and moved to the Reserve of the Supreme High Command.

The 154th was first sent to North Caucasus Front where it was under direct command of the Front as of July 7. Two weeks later it was in 64th Army and positioned west of the Don. When 4th Panzer Army began its advance toward Abganerovo on July 31 the brigade was sent southward to the Nizhne-Yablochnyi region (25km north of Kotelnikovo) to help block the German advance. Within days it was forced to fall back to the Aksay River near Novoaksaysky from where it had to withdraw another 5-10km on August 4. By August 12 it was in the Army's second echelon behind the Myshkova–Tinguta line and as fighting continued on August 20 the Army commander, Maj. Gen. M. S. Shumilov, withdrew the brigade, along with the 138th Rifle Division, to new defensive positions about 5km to the rear. An Army report of September 1 stated that the 154th NRB was by now down to a strength between 500 and 1,000 personnel and the next day was reported as located in the Elkhi region.

On September 4 the brigade was forced to abandon Elkhi although Shumilov reported that he was organizing a counterattack with his reserve 66th NRB. By September 12 the two brigades were defending in tandem on the Army's left flank while refitting in what was to become known as the Beketovka bridgehead on the west bank of the Volga south of the encircled 62nd Army. The brigade had 876 men on strength on September 10.

==== Operation Uranus and Operation Ring ====
Stalingrad Front launched its part in the encirclement of German 6th Army and 4th Panzer Army on November 20. The 66th and 154th NRBs were still in 64th Army in the Beketovka bridgehead and had been partly rebuilt over the preceding weeks. On the first two days General Shumilov held them in reserve with orders to reinforce the Army's shock group's successes. At 2000 hours on November 22 the German IV Army Corps was ordered to fall back to a new defensive line anchored at Tsybenko and continuing east along the Karavatka Balka to Elkhi which was held by units of the 297th Infantry Division. This line would remain in German hands for many weeks. The next day the two brigades closed up to the line and for the rest of the month limited their activities to raiding and reconnaissance.

By the beginning of January 1943 the 64th Army had been transferred to Don Front which was responsible for the final liquidation of the encircled German forces, beginning on January 10. Shumilov organized his main attack on a 6km-wide sector from south of Hill 111.6 east to Elkhi while holding the 29th Rifle Division and the 154th NRB in second echelon. 66th NRB was one of the formations deployed in defensive positions from Elkhi northeastward to the Volga. In the initial attack Tsybenko was encircled and Hill 111.6 captured but the advance seemed to stall, prompting Shumilov to commit the 154th west of Tsybenko as of the morning of the 12th, temporarily under control of 57th Army. During the day it captured the meat canning factory east of Kravtsov. On January 13 the brigade returned to 64th Army control and repulsed a weak counterattack by IV Army Corps reserves near Hill 119.7. At this point the combined assault by 64th and 57th Armies had gained up to 7km northward. But German resistance at Elkhi prevented major gains the following day, prompting the decision to commit the 66th NRB to the general advance scheduled for January 15. On January 27, as Don Front closed in on the German remnants still holding out in Stalingrad, both brigades were ordered to be withdrawn into the Reserve of the Supreme High Command for redeployment to other strategic axes. They were moved by rail to the reserves of Kalinin Front where, during February and March the 66th was converted to the 11th Guards Naval Rifle Brigade while the 154th became the 15th Guards Naval Rifle Brigade. They were soon assigned to 22nd Army and helped form the 44th Rifle Corps, remaining under that command through the summer.

On September 30, 1943 the combined brigades officially became the 119th Guards in the Northwestern Front; as they were already Guards formations there was no presentation of a Guards banner. Once the division completed its reorganization its order of battle was as follows:

- 341st Guards Rifle Regiment
- 343rd Guards Rifle Regiment
- 344th Guards Rifle Regiment
- 325th Guards Artillery Regiment
- 113th Guards Antitank Battalion
- 108th Guards Reconnaissance Company
- 123rd Guards Sapper Battalion
- 119th Guards Signal Battalion (later 126th Guards Signal Company)
- 109th Guards Medical/Sanitation Battalion
- 111th Guards Chemical Defense (Anti-gas) Company
- 110th Guards Motor Transport Company
- 106th Guards Field Bakery
- 107th Guards Divisional Veterinary Hospital
- 1799th Field Postal Station
- 1756th Field Office of the State Bank

The division was placed under the command of Col. Sergei Ivanovich Aksyonov, who had previously commanded both the 170th and 171st Rifle Divisions in the Staraya Russa area. 44th Rifle Corps also contained the 32nd and 46th Rifle Brigades and 22nd Army was positioned south of Kholm, facing the II Army Corps of German 16th Army.

== Into Western Russia ==
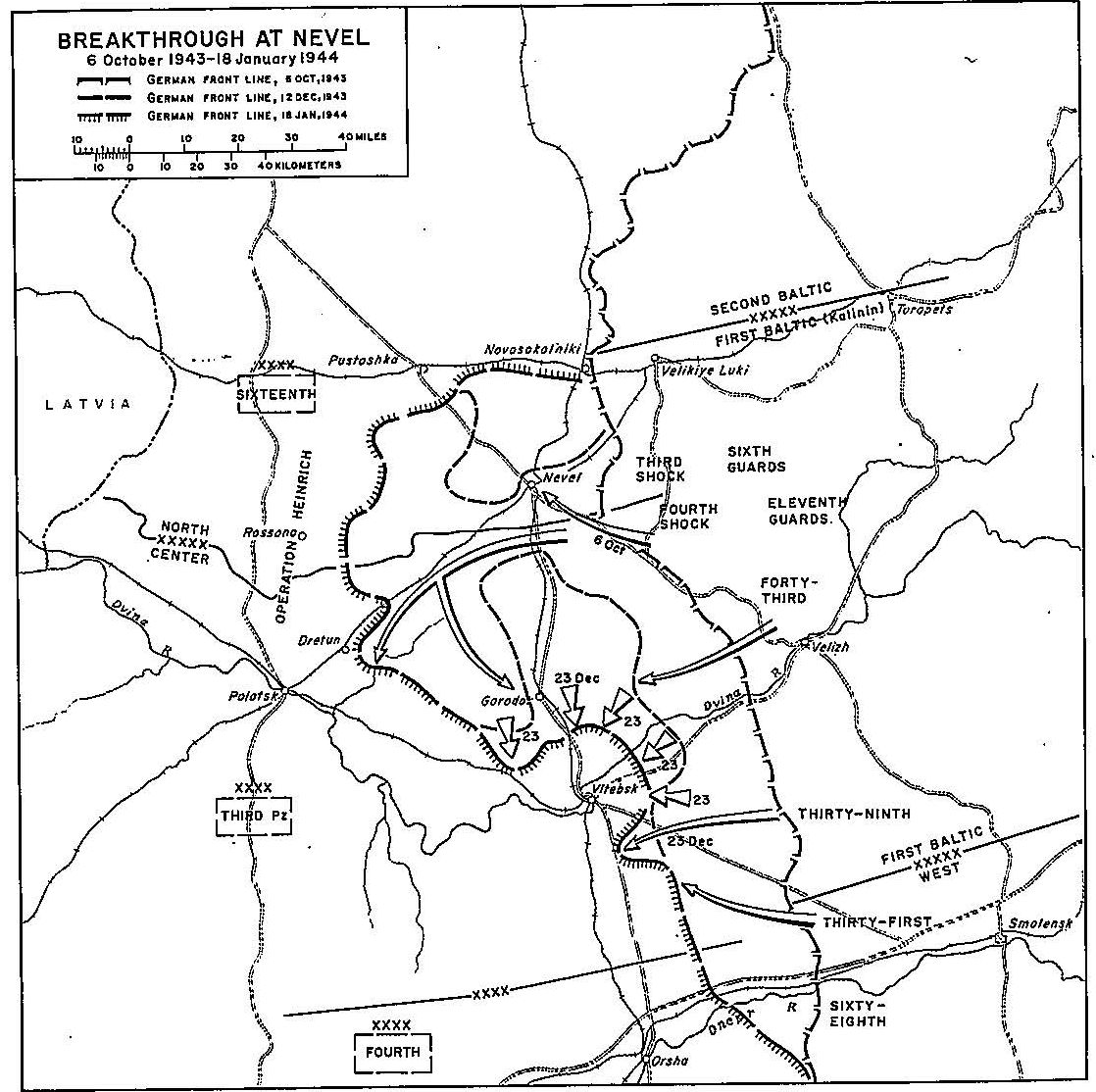
Battle of Nevel and subsequent operations

On October 20 Northwestern Front was redesignated as 2nd Baltic Front and by November 1 the 119th Guards had left 44th Corps and was serving as a separate division in 22nd Army. On the same date Colonel Aksyonov was transferred to command of the 185th Rifle Division and was replaced by Maj. Gen. Pavel Mendelevich Shafarenko, who had previously commanded the 25th Guards Rifle Division. The 3rd and 4th Shock Armies of Kalinin Front had achieved a surprise breakthrough of the German front on October 6 and liberated the town of Nevel before expanding into the rear of 16th and 3rd Panzer Armies over the following days, creating a deep salient. The offensive was renewed from within the salient on November 2; in an early morning fog 3rd and 4th Shock Armies penetrated the defenses of the left flank of 3rd Panzer Army southwest of Nevel. After the breakthrough, which opened a 16km-wide gap, 3rd Shock turned to the north behind the flank of 16th Army while 4th Shock moved southwest behind 3rd Panzer Army. As the offensive continued the Front commander, Army Gen. M. M. Popov, fed in reserves in an effort to encircle and destroy the German forces holding the deep salient running south from Novosokolniki to the initial gap that had been forced on October 6. In mid-November the 119th Guards was assigned to 3rd Shock Army. Supported by 118th Tank Brigade and flanked on the left by 146th Rifle Division it liberated the village of Podberezye and directly threatened to sever the Novosokolniki–Pustoshka rail line:

It seemed as if yet another effort – the mission assigned to us by the front commander – had been fulfilled. The army's forces had created a bridgehead for a deep flank attack on the Idritsa-Novosokolniki enemy grouping from the south in the direction of Idritsa and Sebezh, which would allow us to sever the withdrawal routes of a considerable force of Hitlerites.

The Soviet advance was aided by warm and dry weather and local partisan detachments. The situation so concerned the German command that six infantry battalions were brought in from 18th Army to reinforce the approaches to Pustoshka, which effectively halted the push toward that city as torrential rains began on November 15. Popov ordered his forces over to the defense on November 21.

When December began the 119th Guards was under the command of 3rd Shock Army's 93rd Rifle Corps. It was holding along the east side of the Soviet salient toward Pustoshka in conjunction with the 326th Rifle Division; 93rd Corps was facing the 23rd and 290th Infantry Divisions of the I Army Corps. On December 9 the STAVKA ordered Popov to pierce the defenses at Pustoshka, capture Idritsa, and destroy the German forces in the salient between Novosokolniki and Nevel using 3rd Shock and 6th Guards Armies. This attack began on December 16 but made little progress. The 119th Guards and 326th were joined by the 21st Guards and 20th Rifle Divisions plus the 118th Tank Brigade and dented but failed to penetrate the positions of the 290th Infantry, which was reinforced by the 122nd Infantry Division. The effort was halted after several days.

=== Novosokolniki Pursuit ===
After this failure the division was transferred to the 100th Rifle Corps, still in 3rd Shock Army, where it joined the 21st and 46th Guards Rifle Divisions. On December 16 Hitler had finally conceded the impossibility of closing the gap at Nevel and cutting off the Soviet forces inside the salient, rendering his own salient south of Novosokolniki useless. About a week earlier the STAVKA had ordered Western Front to transfer 10th Guards Army to 2nd Baltic Front to take part in a further attempt to wipe out the German salient. This redeployment took time both due to the seasonal conditions and the need to replenish 10th Guards' formations. In the event the Soviet plans were preempted when Army Group North began to withdraw northward on December 29. This took General Popov by surprise and he hastily organized a pursuit which included the 100th Corps pressing in from the west and following up the withdrawal of the 290th Infantry in cooperation with two divisions of 93rd Corps and three tank brigades. By January 6, 1944 a new German line had been established from Idritsa to south of Pustoshka to Novosokolniki and northward to Lake Ilmen. While this strengthened the German position it turned out to be temporary as the Red Army's offensive at Leningrad and Novgorod later that month would force 16th Army to wheel its defenses back to Pskov.

== Baltic Offensives ==
Later in January the 119th Guards was transferred to the 10th Guards Army, still in 2nd Baltic Front, joining the 7th Guards and 21st Guards Rifle Divisions in 7th Guards Rifle Corps. The division would remain under these commands for the duration of the war. Over the following months the 10th Guards Army closed up to the Panther Line east of Pskov and Ostrov. On May 10 General Shafarenko exchanged commands with Maj. Gen. Ivan Vladimirovich Gribov when he took over Gribov's 33rd Rifle Division; Shafarenko would go on to command the 23rd Guards Rifle Division and in the postwar period the 48th Guards Rifle Division before being promoted to the rank of lieutenant general in 1962.

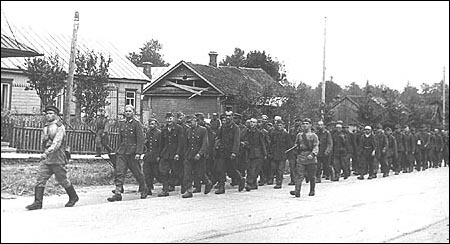
German POWs march through Rezekne, 1944

Near the end of June, as the destruction of Army Group Center was going on in Belarus, the 119th Guards was northeast of Novorzhev on the Sorot River, moving south from Porkhov. During July it took part in the fighting that breached the Panther Line and later that month crossed the border into the Baltic states. Shortly thereafter the division was awarded a battle honor for its part in the liberation of Rezekne, Latvia:

REZEKNE... 119th Guards Rifle Division (Major General Gribov, Ivan Vladimirovich)... The troops who participated in the liberation of Daugavpils and Rezekne, by the order of the Supreme High Command of 27 July 1944, and a commendation in Moscow, are given a salute of 20 artillery salvoes from 224 guns.

By the beginning of August, 10th Guards Army was redeployed somewhat northwards to the area of Kārsava, from where it advanced westward into Latvia over the next six weeks, reaching Lubāna by mid-August. The lowlands of the Aiviekste River and Lake Lubāns define the terrain in the Lubāna region and the division had to cross many waterways during its advance toward Madona, which was liberated on August 13.

During the course of this advance three men of the 341st Guards Rifle Regiment distinguished themselves sufficiently to become Heroes of the Soviet Union. The 1st Battalion was commanded by Maj. Andrei Yegorovich Chernikov and was the first to break through the German rearguards and reach the Aiviekste near Barkava on the night of August 3/4. Using captured rafts and boats Chernikov led his men in establishing and expanding a bridgehead, in the course of which over 100 German soldiers were killed or wounded while 18 artillery pieces and 28 machine guns were captured. Sen. Sgt. Akram Iskandarovich Valiev was a squad leader in Chernikov's battalion who led his men across by swimming. As his squad held off counterattacks he captured three boats and proceeded to make six crossings, ferrying more men into the tenuous bridgehead under mortar and machine gun fire. Sen. Sgt. Osip Andreevich Denisov captured a boat after killing a sentry. Taking advantage of confusion in the German ranks he led 25 of his men to the west bank in it, after which he personally killed or wounded 14 German soldiers while helping to expand the bridgehead. All three men were decreed as Heroes on March 24, 1945 and all survived the war. Chernikov remained in the army and rose to the rank of lieutenant colonel before his death in Moscow in 1950. Valiev reached the rank of lieutenant before being moved to the reserve in 1946 when he returned to his home village in Tatarstan, dying there in 1975. Denisov was demobilized in November 1945 and moved to Ulan-Ude where he lived until his death in 1957.

By the start of October the 119th Guards was on the approaches to Riga, north of the Daugava River, and distinguished itself in the fighting for this city from October 13-15; in recognition, on November 3 it was awarded the Order of the Red Banner. General Gribov became the deputy commander of 10th Guards Army on October 15; he would later command both the 19th and 15th Guards Rifle Corps and would reach the rank of lieutenant general before his retirement in 1957. He was replaced by Col. Andrian Maksimovich Ilyin who had previously served as deputy commander of the 7th Guards Rifle Division.

== Postwar ==
The 10th Guards Army moved to the Kurland Group of Forces in Leningrad Front in March 1945, where it remained for the duration. On March 7 Col. Anatolii Ivanovich Kolobutin took over from Colonel Ilyin; the former had been serving as deputy commander of 7th Guards Rifle Corps. Following the German surrender the division carried the full title: 119th Guards Rifle, Rezekne, Order of the Red Banner Division. (Russian: 119-я гвардейская стрелковая Режицкая Краснознаменная дивизия.) Maj. Gen. Mikhail Grigorevich Makarov took over command in September and led the division for the rest of its existence. It was stationed at Pärnu still with 7th Guards Corps of 10th Guards Army before being disbanded in 1946.
