= 411th =

411th may refer to:

- 411th Bombardment Group, inactive United States Air Force unit
- 411th Bombardment Squadron, part of the 6th Air Mobility Wing at MacDill Air Force Base, Florida
- 411th Civil Affairs Battalion (United States) (Tactical), civil affairs (CA) unit of the United States Army
- 411th Engineer Brigade (United States), combat engineer brigade of the United States Army headquartered in New Windsor, New York
- 411th Fighter Squadron or 196th Reconnaissance Squadron, unit of the California Air National Guard
- 411th Flight Test Squadron (411 FLTS), part of the 412th Test Wing based at Edwards Air Force Base, California
- 411th Support Brigade (United States), support brigade of the United States Army

== See also ==
- 411 (number)
- 411 (disambiguation), including the year 411 (CDXI) of the Julian calendar
- 411 BC
