= 411 =

411 may refer to:

- The year AD 411, the four hundred and eleventh year of the Gregorian calendar
- 411 BC
- 4-1-1, a telephone directory assistance number in the United States and Canada
  - By extension, a slang term for "information"
- 411.com, a Reverse telephone directory web property of Whitepages (company)
- What's the 411?, debut album by Mary J. Blige released in 1992
- The 411, British R&B group
- 4:1:1 chroma subsampling
- Volkswagen 411, a car from the late 1960s
- Bristol 411, a high-performance hand-built luxury car from the 1970s
- 411 (anthology), a three issue anthology, published by Marvel Comics, consisting of short-stories concerning terrorism
- 411, a nickname for Kambo, Norway
- .411, a file extension storing thumbnail-sized versions of pictures taken by early models of SONY's Mavica cameras.
- 411 Video Magazine, a skateboarding video series
- November 2016 Jakarta protests, also known as the 411 Action

== See also ==
- 411th (disambiguation)
- 41 (disambiguation)
