= The Forty-First =

The Forty-first, (Russian: Сорок первый, romanized: Sorok pervyy) may refer to

- The Forty-First (novel), a 1926 novel by Boris Lavrenyov
- The Forty-First (1927 film), a film adaptation of the novel by Yakov Protazanov
- The Forty-First (1956 film), a film adaptation of the novel by Grigori Chukhrai

== See also ==
- 41st (disambiguation)
