= 75th Cavalry Division =

- Active: 10 August 1941 – 26 March 1942
- Country: Soviet Union
- Allegiance: Red Army
- Branch: Cavalry
- Size: Division

The 75th Cavalry Division was a cavalry formation of the Red Army which fought during World War II.

== History ==
It was formed in September and October 1941 in Novosibirsk, Siberian Military District. The compound was formed as part of the ruling NKO USSR № 459ss on 11 August 1941. The redeployment of the division of the Soviet-German front was launched in November 1941. In accordance with the Stavka Directive № 4299 from 2 November 1941 it was relocated from Novosibirsk to Glotovku; on 24 November 1941 it was relocated from Kolyshleya station to the area of Solodcha. The division was part of the 'operational army' (part of the front-line fighting force) from 5 December 1941.

During the war the division was always acted on the Western front and took part in the offensive phase of the Battle of Moscow. As part of the 10th Army participated in the Tula offensive (6–17 December 1941). It was subordinated to the 10th Army from 6 December 1941 to 19 December 1941. The division along with the 41st and 57th Cavalry Divisions to Mishulin's Cavalry Group as the mobile group for the 10th Army. The group minus the 41st Cavalry Division was assigned to attack the flank of the German 2nd Panzer Army south of Tula. Before the group was fully committed the group was assigned to the 1st Guards Cavalry Corps.

It was then transferred to the 1st Guards Cavalry Corps of the Western Front, where it stayed from January 1942 to 21 March 1942. Then the division participated in one of the greatest cavalry raids of the war. On the night of 26–27 January 1942 the Corps slipped across the lines into the German 4th Army's rear areas and began what would be a six-month operation against the German supply lines.

The division was dissolved on 26 March 1942, and portions were used to replenish the 2nd Guards Cavalry Division.

== Composition ==
- 230th Cavalry Regiment
- 234th Cavalry Regiment
- 237th Cavalry Regiment
- 72nd Horse artillery battalion
- 72nd Artillery Park
- 55th separate polueskadron connection
- 47th medico-sanitary squad
- 75th separate squadron of chemical defense
- 56th second food transport
- 270th Divisional veterinary hospital
- 258 Field Postal Station
- 1003rd Field ticket office of the State Bank

== Commanders ==
- Vasily A. Konin, Colonel - 20 August -8 December 1941
- Moskalik Michael Emmanuilovich, Colonel - 8 December 1941 - 26 March 1942

== See also ==
- Cavalry Divisions of the Soviet Union 1917-1945
