= 41 =

41 may refer to:

- 41 (number), the natural number following 40 and preceding 42
- One of the years:
  - 41 BC
  - AD 41
  - 1941
  - 2041

== Arts and entertainment ==
- 41 (film), a 2007 documentary on Nicholas O'Neill, victim of The Station nightclub fire
- 41, a 2012 science-fiction film by Glenn Triggs
- 41, a 2012 documentary on George H. W. Bush
- "#41" (song), 1996, by the Dave Matthews Band
- Survivor 41, a season of CBS reality TV show Survivor
- "Forty One", by Karma to Burn on 2010 album Appalachian Incantation

== People ==
- George H. W. Bush, or "Bush 41" (to distinguish him from his son, George W. Bush), 41st president of the United States
- Nick "41" MacLaren, member of the New Zealand hip hop duo Frontline
- 41 (group), a Brooklyn drill trio

== Other uses ==
- HP-41C, a Hewlett-Packard calculator
- 41 Daphne, a main-belt asteroid
- 41, a variation on the 6-7 meme
- 41%, an Internet slang term for “kill yourself” in reference to the transgender suicide rate.

== See also ==
- 41st (disambiguation)
