= 10th Army (Soviet Union) =

- 10-я армия
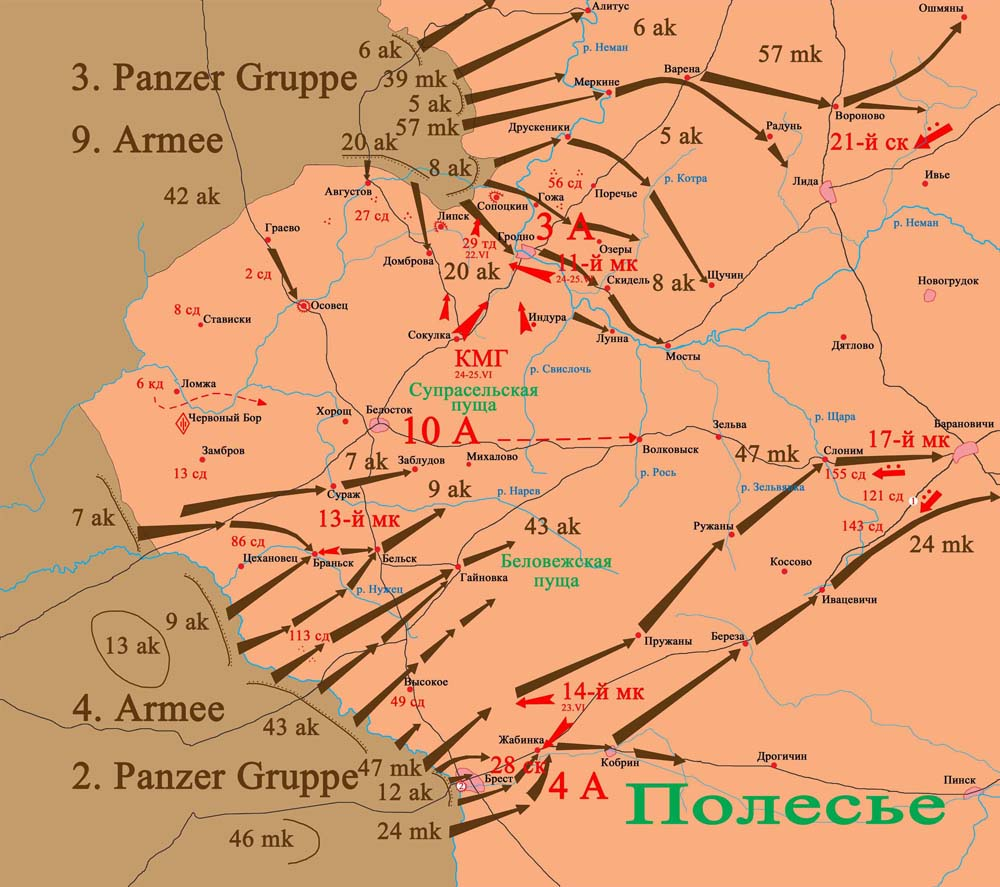
- The initial offensive of the German Army Group "Center" in Belarus, 22–25 June 1941
- Active: 1939–1944
- Country: Soviet Union
- Branch: Red Army
- Type: Combined arms
- Size: Field army
- Engagements: Second World War: Eastern Front

Commanders
- Notable commanders: Filipp Golikov

The 10th Army (Russian: 10-я армия) of the Soviet Union's Red Army was a field army active from 1939 to 1944.

== History ==
The Army was formed in September 1939, in the Moscow Military District, and then deployed to the Western Special Military District. During the Soviet invasion of Poland it consisted, according to Steven Zaloga, of the 11th Rifle Corps (6th, 33rd, and 121st RD); the 16th Rifle Corps (8th, 52nd, and 55th Rifle Divisions); and the 3rd Rifle Corps (in reserve) (33 and 113 RDs), under General Ivan Zakharkin.

On 22 June 1941, at the onset of Operation Barbarossa, the Army was part of the Soviet Western Front. It consisted of the 1st Rifle Corps (2nd and 8th Rifle Divisions); 5th Rifle Corps (including 13th, 86th, and 113th Rifle Divisions); 6th Cavalry Corps (6th and 36th Cavalry Divisions) and 6th and 13th Mechanised Corps, under General K.D. Golubev. It was encircled by German forces in June 1941 and largely destroyed.

By late June, the German Army Group Centre surrounded the 3rd, 4th and the 10th Armies in the Battle of Białystok–Minsk. In the end, all the formations and units of the 10th Army were defeated. On 30 June, while trying to cross the highway Minsk-Baranovichi, the army headquarters was destroyed, coming out of the remnants of the environment were addressed by fitting of the 4th Army. The headquarters was officially disbanded on 5 July 1941. The commander of the 10th Army, Major General KD Golubev, and the army artillery commander, Major General M. Barsukov, escaping from the encirclement in a consolidated group with the August 86th Border Detachment of the NKVD, in late July Golubev was appointed commander of 13th Army, which participated in the Battle of Smolensk.

It was formed three times in 1941, next in October in the Southern Front, but its formation 'was halted due to severe battle conditions'.

It was then reformed in November 1941 in the Volga region, with nine divisions, seven of which were new formations. Soviet official websites give the nine divisions as the 322nd, 323rd, 324th, 325th, 326th, 328th and 330th Rifle, and 57th & 75th Cavalry, thus including two cavalry divisions. Nine of these divisions had been formed in the space of three weeks from the reserve of the Moscow Military District and been trained for 12 hours a day. General Lieutenant Filipp Golikov took command. Golikov's 1967 book describes how the army finished its concentration in the Penza area on 8 November 1941, after which 15 days were devoted to combat training and 5 days to construction of living quarters and other facilities. There were shortages of everything including warm winter clothing. The majority of the troops were between 30 and 40 years of age and, in some cases, up to 65% of the men had no military training. Initially part of the Reserve of the Supreme High Command (Stavka Reserve), it was reassigned to the Western Front for the Battle of Moscow, after moving up to Ryazan attacking on the morning of 6 December 1941. In 1942, it continued its defensive operations on the central axis, and in 1943 took part in the second Battle of Smolensk.

The 10th Army headquarters with associated units was withdrawn from the Western Front to the Stavka Reserve in early April (General Staff's directive of 7.04.44). From 10 April, it was moved to Roslavl, where it was to take control of the 81st and 103rd Rifle Corps (total 5 divisions). That same month, the army was disbanded and its headquarters formed the basis of Headquarters 2nd Belorussian Front while its formations were reassigned to the 49th Army.

== Commanders ==
- Lieutenant-General Ivan Zakharkin (08.1939 – 10.1939)
- Major-General Aleksandr Chernikov (10.1939 – 26.07.1940),
- Lieutenant-General Vladimir Zakharovich Romanovsky (07.1940 – 03.1941)
- Major-General Konstantin Golubev (03.1941 – 5.07.1941), army disbanded
- Lieutenant-General Mikhail Yefremov (01.10.1941 – 17.10.1941), army disbanded
- Lieutenant-General Filipp Golikov (01.11.1941 – 01.02.1942),
- Lieutenant-General Vasily Popov (02.02.1942 – 04.1944),
- Lieutenant-General Vasily Kryuchenkin (04.1944 – 23.04.1944), army disbanded.
