= 41st Iowa Infantry Battalion =

- Iowa state flag
- Active: November 6, 1861, to April, 1863
- Country: United States
- Allegiance: Union
- Branch: Infantry
- Engagements: Siege of Vicksburg

The 41st Iowa Infantry Battalion was an infantry battalion that served in the Union Army during the American Civil War.

== Service ==
The 41st Iowa Infantry was organized as Companies A, B, and C of the 14th Iowa Volunteer Infantry Regiment at Davenport, Iowa and mustered in for three years of Federal service on November 6, 1861. These three companies were immediately detached and sent to Fort Randall, Dakota Territory, arriving there on December 5, 1861. One of the companies was later posted north to Fort Pierre. The Battalion was permanently detached from the 14th Iowa on September 18, 1862 for service in the Department of the Northwest, where they remained until May 1863. The battalion was transferred to the 7th Iowa Volunteer Cavalry Regiment in April 1863. The state of Iowa considered using the companies as the nucleus for a 41st Iowa Regiment, but that plan was abandoned.

== Total strength and casualties ==
A total of 293 men served in the 41st Iowa Battalion at one time or another during its existence. It suffered 2 enlisted men who died of disease, for a total of 2 fatalities.

== Commanders ==
- Major John Pattee

== See also ==
- List of Iowa Civil War Units
- Iowa in the American Civil War
