= 57th Cavalry Division =

- Active: 1 August 1941 – 3 February 1942
- Country: Soviet Union
- Branch: Red Army
- Type: Cavalry
- Size: Division

The 57th Cavalry Division (Russian: 57-я кавалерийская дивизия) was a cavalry division of the Red Army during World War II.

== History ==
It was formed between 1 August and October 1941 at Ferghana in the Central Asian Military District, with the 212th, 218th, and 225th Cavalry Regiments. The division was part of the second wave of cavalry division formed during the war. The division spent almost three months in the rear before being deployed to the front. In October, the division moved to the Volga Military District to join the 10th Army.

The division, along with the 41st and 75th Cavalry Divisions, was assigned to Mishulin's Cavalry Group, the mobile group for the 10th Army. The group minus the 41st Cavalry Division was assigned to attack the flank of the German 2nd Panzer Army south of Tula. Before it was fully committed, the group was assigned to the 1st Guards Cavalry Corps.

It was then transferred to the 1st Guards Cavalry Corps of the Western Front – January 1942 to 21 March 1942. Then the division participated in one of the greatest cavalry raids of the war. On the night of 26–27 January 1942, the corps slipped across the lines into the German 4th Army's rear areas and began what would be a six-month operation against the German supply lines.

The division was dissolved on 3 February 1942, and portions were used to replenish the 1st Guards Cavalry Division.

== Composition ==
- 212th Cavalry Regiment
- 218th Cavalry Regiment
- 225th Cavalry Regiment

== Commanders ==
The following officer commanded the division during its existence:

- Colonel Ivan Murov (1 August 1941 – 3 February 1942)
