= Novoaksaysky =

Novoaksaysky Новоаксайский
- Khutor
- Location within Volgograd Oblast Location within Russia
- Coordinates: 48°00′N 43°15′E
- Country: Russia
- Region: Volgograd Oblast
- District: Oktyabrsky District
- Time zone: UTC+4:00

Novoaksaysky (Russian: Новоаксайский) is a rural locality (a khutor) and the administrative center of Novoaksayskoye Rural Settlement, Oktyabrsky District, Volgograd Oblast, Russia. The population was 742 as of 2010. There are 9 streets.

== Geography ==
Novoaksaysky is located in steppe, on Yergeni, on the right bank of the Aksay River, 35 km west of Oktyabrsky (the district's administrative centre) by road. Generalovsky is the nearest rural locality.
