= Vysokovsk =

Town in Moscow Oblast, Russia

Vysokovsk Высоковск
- Town
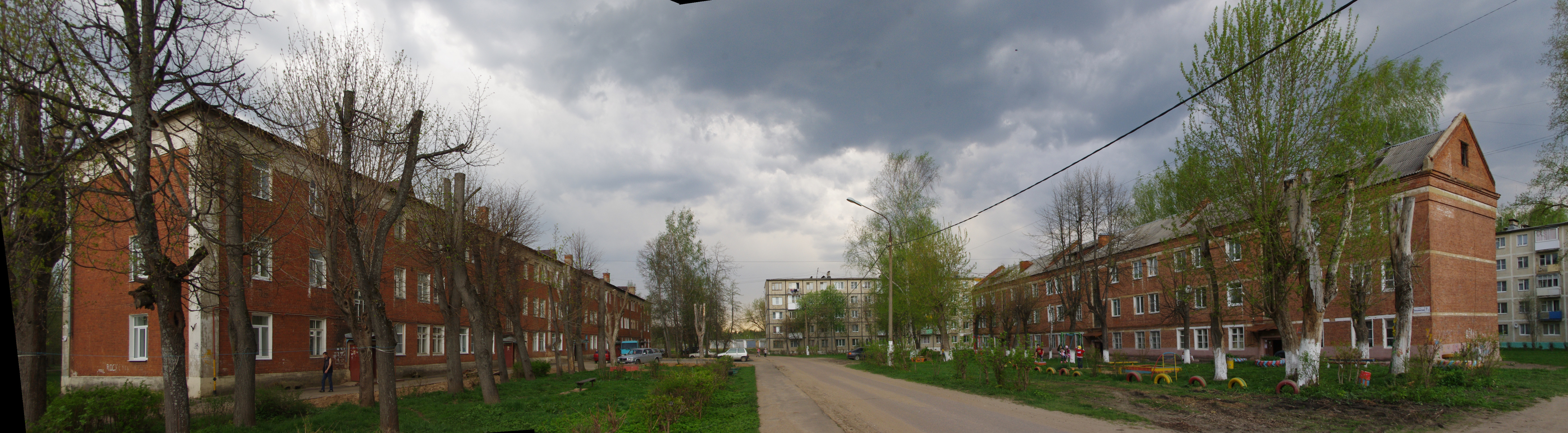
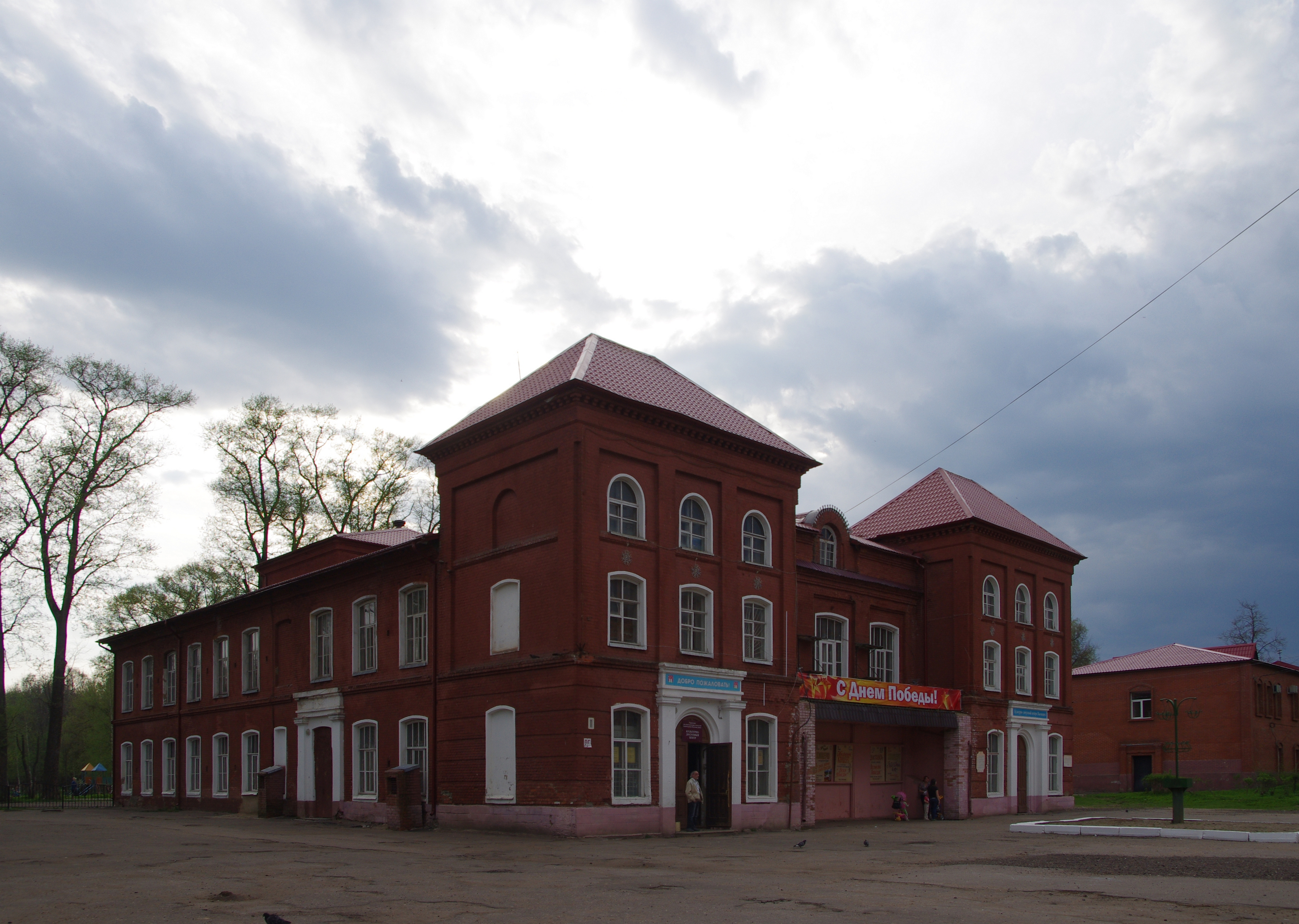
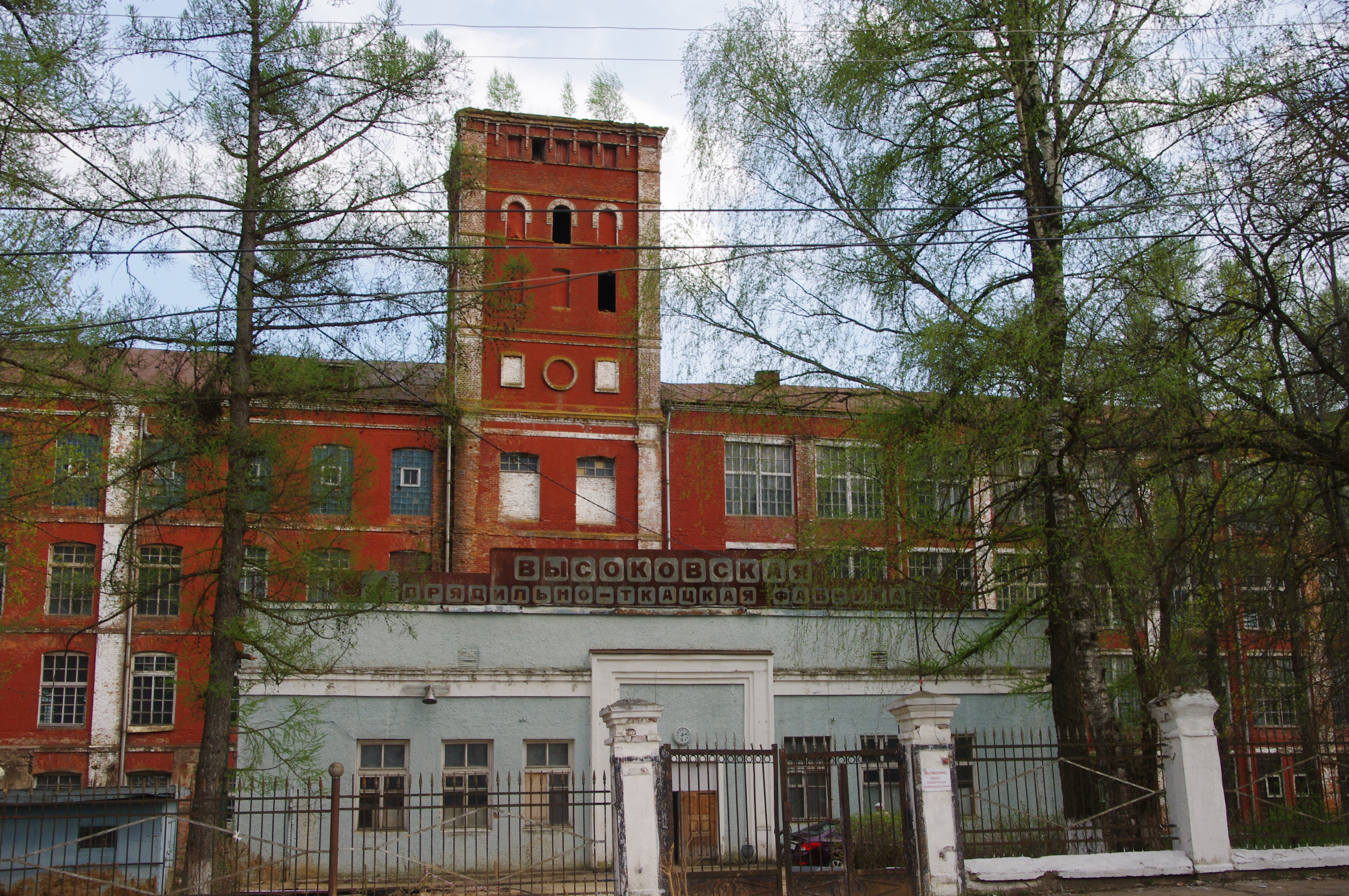
- Top-down, left-to-right: apartment buildings, town hall, Vysokovsk cotton mill

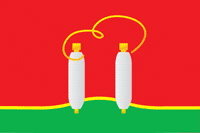
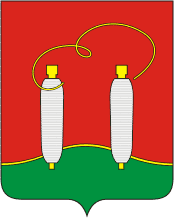
- Flag Coat of arms
- Interactive map of Vysokovsk
- Location of Vysokovsk Vysokovsk (Moscow Oblast)
- Coordinates: 56°19′N 36°33′E
- Country: Russia
- Federal subject: Moscow Oblast
- Administrative district: Klinsky District
- TownSelsoviet: Vysokovsk
- Founded: 1879
- Town status since: 1940
- Elevation: 160 m (520 ft)

Population (2010 Census)
  - Total: 10,635
  - Estimate (2025): 12,965 (+21.9%)

Administrative status
  - Capital of: Town of Vysokovsk

Municipal status
  - Municipal district: Klinsky Municipal District
  - Urban settlement: Vysokovsk Urban Settlement
  - Capital of: Vysokovsk Urban Settlement
- Time zone: UTC+3 (MSK)
- Postal code: 141650
- OKTMO ID: 46737000006

Vysokovsk (Russian: Высоко́вск) is a town in Klinsky District of Moscow Oblast, Russia, located 99 kilometers (62 mi) northwest of Moscow. Population: 10,635 (2010 census); 10,950 (2002 census); 11,611 (1989 Soviet census).

== History ==
It was founded in 1879 due to the construction of a textile factory by the Vysokovskaya Manufactory Company. Two minor settlements servicing the factory—Vysokoye (Высо́кое) and Novy Bazar (Но́вый База́р)—grew into one, named Vysokovsky (Высоко́вский), in 1928. It was granted town status in 1940 and renamed Vysokovsk.

== Demographics ==
Historical population
| Year | Pop. | ±% |
|---|---|---|
| 1897 | 3,700 | — |
| 1926 | 8,100 | +118.9% |
| 1931 | 9,000 | +11.1% |
| 1939 | 11,485 | +27.6% |
| 1959 | 11,057 | −3.7% |
| 1970 | 12,230 | +10.6% |
| 1979 | 11,377 | −7.0% |
| 1989 | 11,611 | +2.1% |
| 1992 | 11,500 | −1.0% |
| 1996 | 11,400 | −0.9% |
| 1998 | 11,900 | +4.4% |
| 2001 | 11,800 | −0.8% |
| 2002 | 10,950 | −7.2% |
| 2003 | 11,000 | +0.5% |
| 2005 | 10,800 | −1.8% |
| 2006 | 10,700 | −0.9% |
| 2007 | 10,700 | +0.0% |
| 2009 | 10,673 | −0.3% |
| 2010 | 10,635 | −0.4% |
| 2011 | 10,600 | −0.3% |
| 2012 | 10,561 | −0.4% |
| 2013 | 10,535 | −0.2% |
| 2014 | 10,659 | +1.2% |
| 2015 | 10,676 | +0.2% |
| 2016 | 10,690 | +0.1% |
| 2017 | 10,671 | −0.2% |
| 2018 | 10,586 | −0.8% |
| 2019 | 10,394 | −1.8% |
| 2020 | 10,362 | −0.3% |

== Geography ==
=== Climate ===
Climate data for Vysokovsk
| Month | Jan | Feb | Mar | Apr | May | Jun | Jul | Aug | Sep | Oct | Nov | Dec | Year |
|---|---|---|---|---|---|---|---|---|---|---|---|---|---|
| Mean daily maximum °C (°F) | −4 (25) | −4 (25) | 0 (32) | 9 (48) | 17 (63) | 20 (68) | 23 (73) | 21 (70) | 16 (61) | 9 (48) | 1 (34) | −3 (27) | 9 (48) |
| Mean daily minimum °C (°F) | −11 (12) | −11 (12) | −6 (21) | 1 (34) | 6 (43) | 10 (50) | 13 (55) | 11 (52) | 7 (45) | 2 (36) | −3 (27) | −9 (16) | 1 (34) |
| Average precipitation mm (inches) | 35 (1.4) | 34 (1.3) | 33 (1.3) | 40 (1.6) | 66 (2.6) | 80 (3.1) | 69 (2.7) | 64 (2.5) | 60 (2.4) | 53 (2.1) | 44 (1.7) | 39 (1.5) | 617 (24.2) |
Source: www.meteoblue.com,

== Education ==
=== Primary and secondary education ===
There are two secondary schools in Vysokovsk.

== Administrative and municipal status ==
Within the framework of administrative divisions, it is, together with seventeen rural localities, incorporated within Klinsky District as the Town of Vysokovsk. As a municipal division, the Town of Vysokovsk is incorporated within Klinsky Municipal District as Vysokovsk Urban Settlement.
