= 41st Division (Yugoslav Partisans) =

Yugoslav Partisan military division formed in 1944

41st Macedonia Division
- Четириесет и прва македонска дивизија
- Flag of Democratic Federal Yugoslavia (used by the Partisans)
- Active: 25 August 1944–May 1945
- Country: Yugolslavia
- Allegiance: Yugoslav Partisans
- Branch: Yugoslav Partisan Army
- Type: Infantry
- Size: ~2,700 (upon formation)
- Engagements: World War II: World War II in Yugoslavia

Commanders
- Notable commanders: Tihomir Miloševski(August 1944 - September 1944); Naum Veslievski (September 1944 - December 1944); Metodija Popovski (December 1944 - May 1945)

The 41st Macedonia Division (Macedonian: Четириесет и прва македонска дивизија) was formed on 25 August 1944 in the village of Šeškovo near Kavadarci. It was formed from the 2nd, 4th and 10th Macedonia Brigades which had a total strength of 2,700 soldiers. It mostly fought in Yugoslav Macedonia and Kosovo. During its existence the division had 3 different commanders and 4 different political commissars.
