= 41st Division =

41st Division or 41st Infantry Division may refer to:

== Infantry divisions ==
- 41st Infantry Division (France)
- 41st Division (German Empire)
- 41st Infantry Division (Wehrmacht), Germany
- 41st Tharallah Division, Iran
- 41st Infantry Division "Firenze", Kingdom of Italy
- 41st Division (Imperial Japanese Army)
- 41st Division (Philippines)
- 41st Infantry Division (Poland)
- 41st Infantry Division (Russian Empire)
- 41st Guards Rifle Division, Soviet Union
- 41st Rifle Division, Soviet Union
- 41st Division (Spain)
- 41st Division (United Kingdom)
- 41st Infantry Division (United States)
- 41st Division (Yugoslav Partisans)

== Other divisions ==
- 41st Cavalry Division, Soviet Union
- 41st Guards Rocket Division, Soviet and Russian Strategic Rocket Forces
- 41st Air Division, United States Air Force

== See also ==
- List of military divisions by number
- 41st Army (disambiguation)
- XLI Corps (disambiguation)
- 41st Brigade (disambiguation)
- 41st Regiment (disambiguation)
- 41st Battalion (disambiguation)
- 41st Squadron (disambiguation)
