= Peschanka, Sredneakhtubinsky District, Volgograd Oblast =

Peschanka Песчанка
- Settlement
- Location within Volgograd Oblast Location within Russia
- Coordinates: 48°40′N 44°35′E
- Country: Russia
- Region: Volgograd Oblast
- District: Sredneakhtubinsky District
- Time zone: UTC+4:00

Peschanka (Russian: Песчанка) is a rural locality (a settlement) in Krasnoslobodsk, Sredneakhtubinsky District, Volgograd Oblast, Russia. The population was 542 as of 2010.

== Geography ==
The village is located on the left bank of the Sudomoyka Erik, 19 km WSW from Srednyaya Akhtuba.
