= 411th Support Brigade (United States) =

411th Contracting Support Brigade
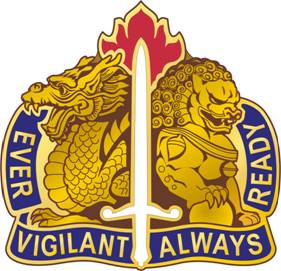
- Active: February 6, 2008 - present
- Country: United States
- Branch: United States Army
- Type: Support
- Size: Brigade
- Part of: Army Contracting Command
- Garrison/HQ: Camp Humphreys, Korea
- Motto: Ever Vigilant Always Ready

Commanders
- Current commander: COL Tony Rogers

Insignia
- Current SSI United States Army Materiel Command

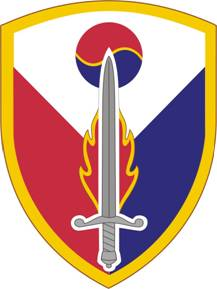
- Former Unit SSI 2008-2010

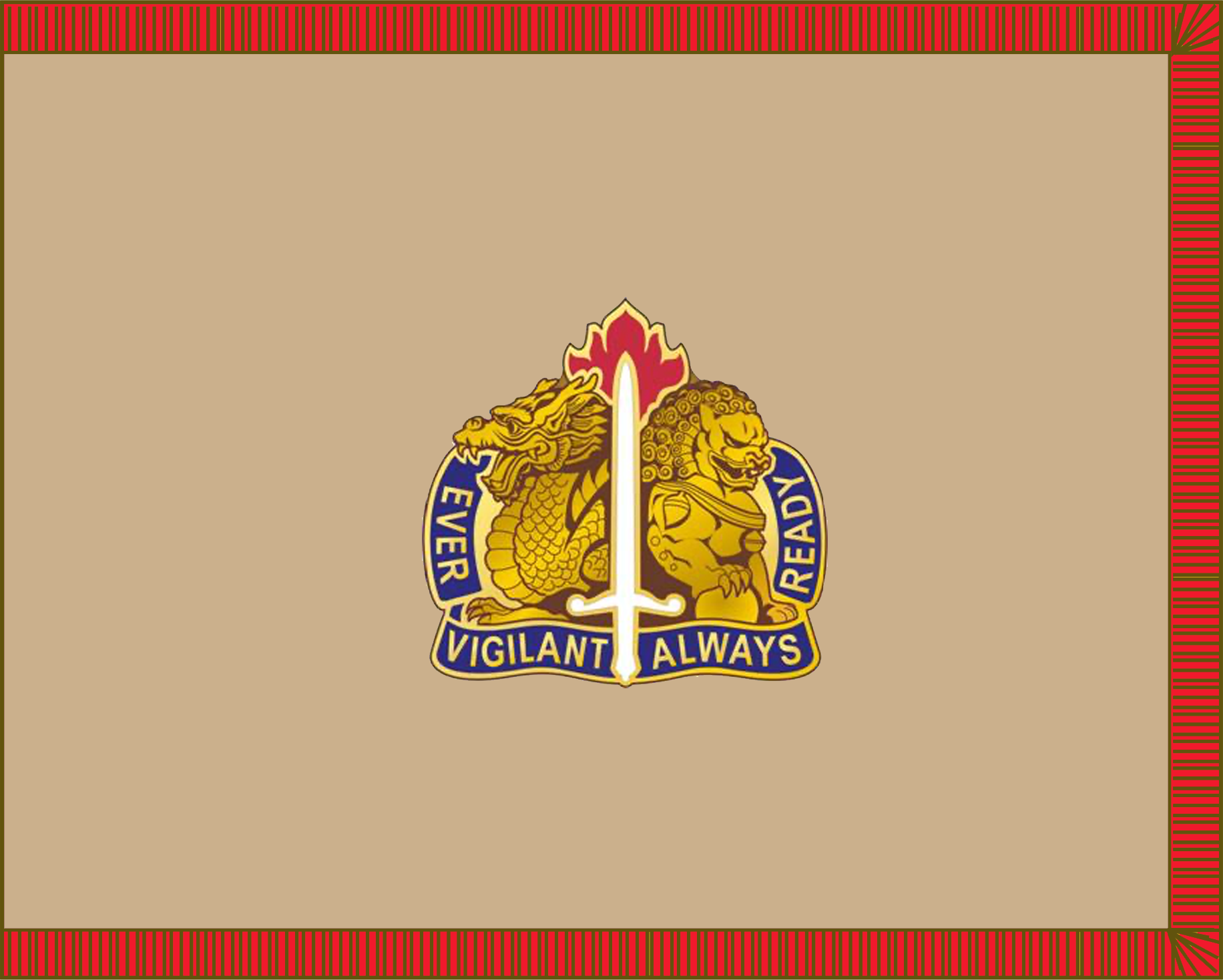
- 411th Support Brigade Flag

The 411th Support Brigade is a support brigade of the United States Army. The Brigade was activated February 6, 2008 at US Army Garrison - Yongsan, South Korea. The brigade was then stationed at Camp Coiner.

The brigade provided "Services such as vehicle and weapon maintenance, installation food services, health care, minor construction and IT support may not be the stuff of movie scripts, but they are an integral part of what makes our Army strong," said Maj. Gen. Robert M. Radin commander of the Army Sustainment Command.

As of 2023, Col. Tony Rogers is the commander of the brigade.

== Insignia ==
The Distinctive Unit Insignia is a gold metal pin In the center are a gold Asian dragon facing left and a gold Asian lion facing right. Between them is a white sword with flames at the top of the blade. A blue scroll contains the motto "Ever Vigilant, Always Ready."
