= 41st Street =

41st Street may refer to:

- 41st Street (Baltimore)
- 41st Street (Manhattan)

== See also ==
- Oakridge–41st Avenue station in Vancouver, British Columbia, Canada
