= Glenn Triggs =

Australian filmmaker

Glenn Triggs (born 1 April 1983) is an Australian screenwriter, director, producer, editor, and music composer. He has directed such films as The Comet Kids (2017), 41 (2012), Apocalyptic (2014), and Dreams of Paper & Ink (2022).

Triggs grew up in the eastern suburbs of Melbourne. In his final year of high school, Triggs's first attempt at a feature film, No One, was selected for the Top Arts awards.

Triggs studied film and television at the Victorian College of the Arts in 2003 at the age of 19. He has since gone on to write, produce, and direct more than forty short films and six features independently, including Cinnamon Rain (2001), The Babyslitter (2003), and Lunar (2005).

== Filmography ==
- Father Jacob Trilogy (1998; 3 shorts, each 5 minutes long).
- The War (1999; 6 minutes)
- The Fisherman (2000; 5 minutes)
- Trepidation (2000; 7 minutes)
- The Next Night (2000; 14 minutes)
- No One (2000; 53 minutes)
- Cinnamon Rain (2001; 60 minutes)
- How to Make a Horror Movie (2001; 8 minutes)
- The Babyslitter (2002; 10 minutes)
- Tickets (2002; 8 minutes)
- The Follow (2004; 65 minutes)
- Lunar (2005; 23 minutes –- 16mm)
- Cinemaphobia (2010; 82 minutes)
- 41 (2012; 86 minutes)
- Apocalyptic (2013; 83 minutes)
- Sonnigsburg TV series - (Director/Editor -- 1 episode)
- The Comet Kids (2017; 92 minutes)
- Dreams of Paper and Ink (2022; 77 minutes)
- Bakhtak: The Sleep Demon -- in development
- Bad Movie -- in development
- The Dark Epic -- in development
- Ancestry Road -- in development
- Video Galaxy -- in development

== Awards / Festivals ==
=== No-One ===
- Top Arts (Australia) Finalist (2001)

=== Lunar ===
- Los Angeles Short Film Festival (USA) Finalist (2005)

=== Cinemaphobia ===
- Melbourne Underground Film Festival (Australia) Official Selection (2010)

=== 41 ===
- Las Vegas Film Festival (USA) Golden Ace Award (2012)
- Made in Melbourne Film Festival (Australia)
- Maverick Movie Awards (New York, USA)
  - Winner: Best Original Score
  - Nominated: Best Actor
  - Nominated: Best Supporting Actress
  - Nominated: Best Director
  - Nominated: Best Screenplay
- Rhode Island International Film Festival (USA)
  - Winner: Best Film

=== Apocalyptic ===
- MonsterFest (Australia) Official Selection (2013)
- Mauvis Genre (France) Official Selection (2013)
- British Horror Film Festival (UK) Official Selection (2014)
- Winner: Best Film
- Melbourne Underground Film Festival (Australia) Official Selection (2014)
- British Horror Film Festival (UK) Winner - Best Feature (2014)
- BUT Film Festival (NL) - Official Selection (2014)

=== The Comet Kids ===
- Vision Splendid Outback Film Festival - Official Selection (2019)

=== Dreams of Paper & Ink ===
- Vision Splendid Outback Film Festival - Official Selection (2021)

== Sources ==
- http://digital-retribution.com/features/10/ID100302.php
- http://www.cultprojections.com/interviews/qa-with-glenn-triggs http://www.ukhorrorscene.com/apocalyptic-2014-dvd-review/
- http://cinemaaustralia.com.au/2014/03/11/trailer-apocalyptic/
- https://web.archive.org/web/20140828170625/http://darkepic.net/press.html https://web.archive.org/web/20140904060655/http://filmink.com.au/news/movies-amp-magic-tricks/
- http://thecrat.com/movie-reviews/adam-says-41-is-the-greatest-film-of-all-time/
- http://screen-space.squarespace.com/features/2012/4/25/glenn-triggs-hotel-rooms-and-time-travel.html
- http://www.innersense.com.au/mif/triggs.html
