= 41st Cavalry Division =

- Active: 20 July 1941 – 5 January 1942
- Disbanded: 5 January 1942
- Country: Soviet Union
- Branch: Red Army
- Type: Cavalry
- Size: Division
- Engagements: World War II

The 41st Cavalry Division was a cavalry formation of the Red Army during the Great Patriotic War.

It was formed on 20 July 1941 in the Northwestern Front using any elements the headquarters could find. In August 1941 the division was moved back to the Moscow Military District to complete its organization. Assigned to the STAVKA Reserves in September when the German offensive started against Moscow. By late October the division was assigned to the 50th Army on the Southern flank of the Western Front. The division covered the gap between the 50th Army and the Southwestern Fronts 3rd Army.

When the Soviet Offensive started in December the division was assigned to the Mishulin's Cavalry Group along with the 57th and 75th Cavalry Divisions. Assigned to the group from 19 December 1941 the division having been burned out the fighting in November was officially disbanded on 5 January 1942.

== Composition ==
- 168th Cavalry Regiment
- 170th Cavalry Regiment
- 172nd Cavalry Regiment

== See also ==
- Cavalry Divisions of the Soviet Union 1917-1945
