= 41st Battalion =

41st Battalion or 41st Infantry Battalion may refer to:

- 41st Battalion (French Canadian), CEF, an infantry unit of the Canadian Expeditionary Force during World War I
- 41st Battalion, Royal New South Wales Regiment, a unit of the Australian Army
- 41 Commando, a unit of the United Kingdom Royal Marine Corps
- 41st Battalion Iowa Volunteer Infantry, a unit of the Union (Northern) Army during the American Civil War

== See also ==
- 41st Division (disambiguation)
- 41st Brigade (disambiguation)
- 41st Regiment (disambiguation)
- 41st Squadron (disambiguation)
