= 41st Brigade =

41st Brigade or 41st Infantry Brigade may refer to:

== Canada ==
- 41 Canadian Brigade Group, a unit of the Canadian Army

== Germany ==
- 41st Panzergrenadier Brigade (Bundeswehr)

== India ==
- 41st Indian Brigade of the British Indian Army in the First World War

== Iran ==
- 41st Tharallah Brigade

== Ukraine ==
- 41st Mechanized Brigade (Ukraine), a unit of the Ukrainian Ground Forces

== United Kingdom ==
- 41st Brigade (United Kingdom)
- 41st (London) Anti-Aircraft Brigade
- 41st Brigade Royal Field Artillery

== United States ==
- 41st Field Artillery Brigade (United States)
- 41st Infantry Brigade Combat Team (United States)

== See also ==
- 41st Army (disambiguation)
- XLI Corps (disambiguation)
- 41st Division (disambiguation)
- 41st Regiment (disambiguation)
- 41st Battalion (disambiguation)
- 41st Squadron (disambiguation)
