= 41 Squadron =

41 Squadron or 41st Squadron may refer to:

- No. 41 Squadron RAF, a unit of the United Kingdom Royal Air Force
- No. 41 Squadron RAAF, a unit of the Royal Australian Air Force
- No. 41 Squadron RNZAF, a unit of the Royal New Zealand Air Force
- 41 Squadron SAAF, a unit of the South African Air Force
- No. 41 Squadron (Finland), a unit of the Finnish Air Force
- 41st Airlift Squadron, a unit of the United States Air Force
- Strike Fighter Squadron 41 (VFA-41), a unit of the United States Navy
- Marine Aviation Logistics Squadron 41, a unit of the United States Marine Corps

== See also ==
- 41st Battalion (disambiguation)
- 41st Regiment (disambiguation)
- 41st Brigade (disambiguation)
- 41st Division (disambiguation)
