= 41st Regiment =

41st Regiment, 41st Infantry Regiment or 41st Armoured Regiment may refer to:

== Infantry regiments ==
- 41st Dogras, an infantry regiment of the British Indian army
- 41st Infantry Regiment (Greece)
- 41st Infantry Regiment (Philippine Commonwealth), a unit of the Philippine Commonwealth Army
- 41st (Welsh) Regiment of Foot (United Kingdom), a unit of the British Army
- 41st Infantry Regiment (United States), a unit of the United States Army

== Artillery regiments ==
- 41 Field Regiment (India), a unit of the Indian Army

== Armoured regiments ==
- 41 Armoured Regiment (India), a unit of the Indian Army
- 41st (Oldham) Royal Tank Regiment (United Kingdom), a unit of the British Army
- 40th/41st Royal Tank Regiment (United Kingdom), a unit of the British Army

== Bomber regiments ==
- 41st Bomber Aviation Regiment, an aviation unit of the Yugoslav Air Force

== Engineer regiments ==
- 41 Combat Engineer Regiment, a unit of the Canadian Army

== American Civil War regiments ==
- 41st Illinois Volunteer Infantry Regiment, a unit of the Union (North) Army during the American Civil War
- 41st Indiana Infantry Regiment, a unit of the Union (North) Army during the American Civil War
- 41st Regiment Massachusetts Volunteer Infantry, a unit of the Union (North) Army during the American Civil War
- 41st Wisconsin Volunteer Infantry Regiment, a unit of the Union (North) Army during the American Civil War
- 41st New York Volunteer Infantry Regiment, a unit of the Union (North) Army during the American Civil War
- 41st Virginia Infantry, a unit of the Confederate (Southern) Army during the American Civil War

== See also ==
- 41st Division (disambiguation)
- 41st Brigade (disambiguation)
- 41st Squadron (disambiguation)
- 41st Battalion (disambiguation)
