= Abdulkhakim Ismailov =

Soviet soldier during World War II (1916–2010)

Abdulkhakim Isakovich Ismailov
- Абдулгьаким Исакъны уланы Исмайиланы
- Born: 1 July 1916; Aksay, (Note: A village in present-day Dagestan that was reportedly claimed by Ismailov as his place of birth.) Terek Oblast, Russian Empire (now Russia)
- Died: 17 February 2010 (aged 93); Chagarotar, Dagestan, Russia
- Military career
- Allegiance: Soviet Union
- Branch: Red Army
- Service years: 1939–1945
- Rank: Sergeant
- Known for: Raising a Flag over the Reichstag
- Engagements: World War II; Winter War; Eastern Front
- Awards: Hero of the Russian Federation (1996)

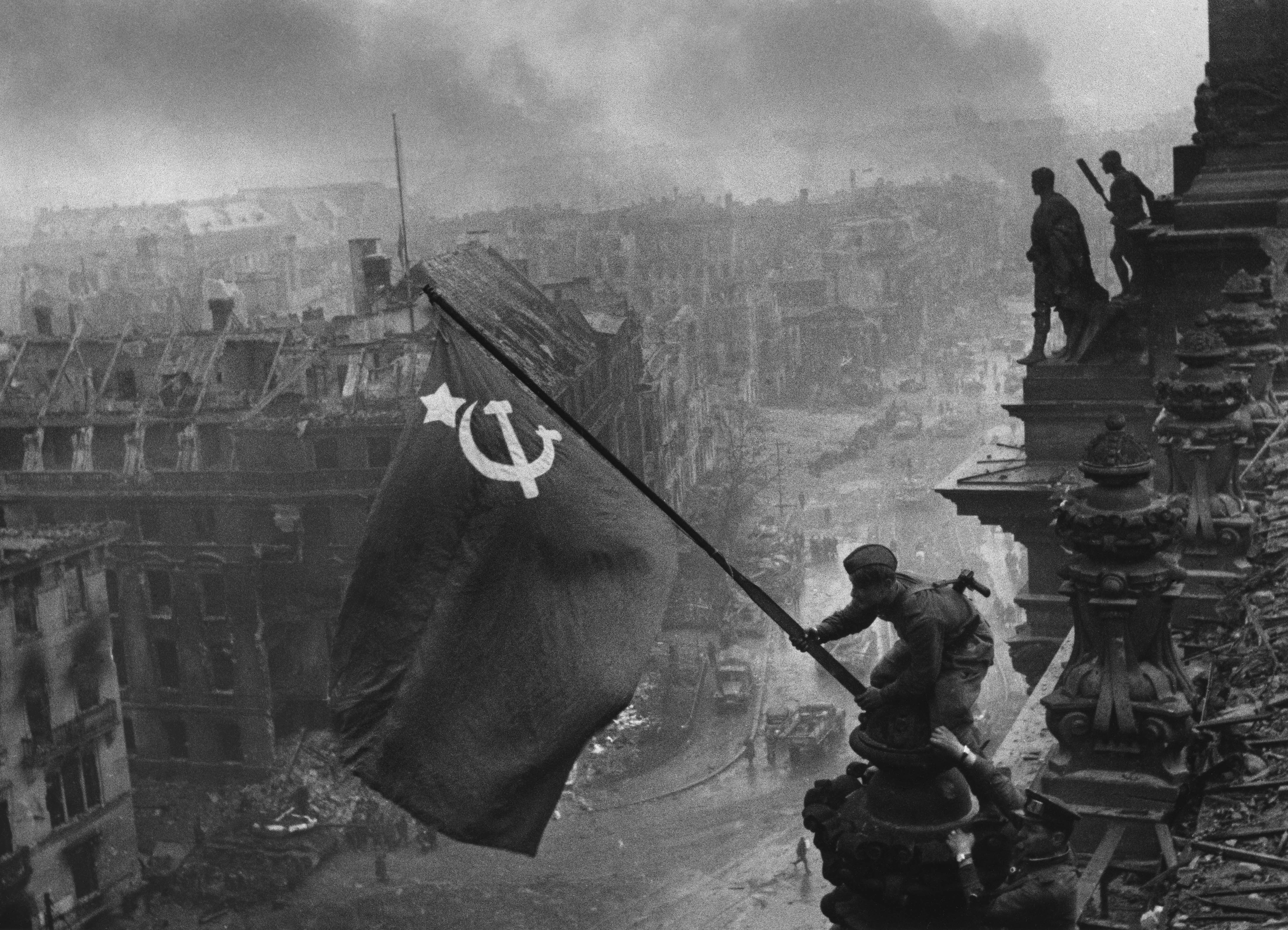
Ismailov holding the flag-bearer, Aleksey Kovalev, in the Raising a Flag over the Reichstag photograph taken on 2 May 1945.

Abdulkhakim Isakovich Ismailov (Note: Transliteration of Russian: Абдулхаким Исакович Исмаилов. Kumyk: Абдулгьаким Исакъны уланы Исмайиланы, Abdulhakim İsaqnı ulanı İsmayilanı) (1 July 1916 – 17 February 2010) was a Soviet soldier who was identified as one of the two men in the 1945 photograph Raising a Flag over the Reichstag, which was taken by Soviet war photographer Yevgeny Khaldei during the Battle in Berlin and which subsequently grew in prominence to symbolize the Soviet Union's victory over Nazi Germany. Following Germany's invasion of the Soviet Union in June 1941, he took part in the Battle of Stalingrad and continued to fight on the Eastern Front until the end of World War II in Europe in May 1945. Despite sustaining severe injuries multiple times during the conflict, he regularly returned to active service and was highly decorated by the Soviet Union and later by the Russian Federation for his achievements.

== Early and later life ==
Ismailov was a Kumyk (a Turkic ethnicity) who hailed from present-day Dagestan. According to his own words, he was born in Aksay and not in his officially recorded birthplace of Chagarotar. He died in Chagarotar at the age of 93 on 17 February 2010.

== Military career ==
He was severely wounded five times during World War II, including the Battle of Stalingrad, but constantly returned to the frontlines.

The iconic photograph Raising a Flag over the Reichstag has been compared to the picture of American Marines raising the US flag on Iwo Jima in the Pacific theater. Photographer Yevgeny Khaldei recruited three Soviet soldiers for the picture – Aleksei Kovalyev, a teenager, held the flag over the Reichstag, while Ismailov and Aleksei Goryachev also appeared hoisting the flag in the photograph. Ismailov's role in the photograph remained unknown until Kovalyev identified Ismailov in a 1995 television documentary. Ismailov was honored as a Hero of Russia in 1996.

In the image, Ismailov appears to be wearing two watches, which some speculate that this implies he looted at least one of them. As a result, the photo was edited.

=== Awards and decorations ===
Hero of the Russian Federation (19 February 1996)
Order of the Red Banner, twice (18 May 1945)
Order of the Patriotic War, 1st class (11 March 1985)
Order of Glory, 3rd class (8 March 1945)
Medal "For Courage" (12 March 1944)
Medal of Zhukov
Medal "For the Liberation of Warsaw" (1945)
Medal "For the Capture of Berlin" (1945)
Medal "For the Victory over Germany in the Great Patriotic War 1941–1945" (1945)
Jubilee Medal "Twenty Years of Victory in the Great Patriotic War 1941-1945" (1965)
Jubilee Medal "Thirty Years of Victory in the Great Patriotic War 1941–1945" (1975)
Jubilee Medal "Forty Years of Victory in the Great Patriotic War 1941–1945" (1985)
Jubilee Medal "50 Years of Victory in the Great Patriotic War 1941–1945" (1993)
Jubilee Medal "60 Years of Victory in the Great Patriotic War 1941–1945" (2004)
Jubilee Medal "In Commemoration of the 100th Anniversary of the Birth of Vladimir Ilyich Lenin" (1969)
Jubilee Medal "50 Years of the Armed Forces of the USSR" (1968)
Jubilee Medal "60 Years of the Armed Forces of the USSR" (1978)
Jubilee Medal "70 Years of the Armed Forces of the USSR" (1988)

== See also ==
- List of Heroes of the Russian Federation (I)
- Yevgeny Khaldei, a Soviet Ukrainian soldier who took the photograph featuring Ismailov
  - Aleksei Leontievich Kovalev, a Soviet Russian soldier who allegedly assisted with taking Khaldei's photograph
- Raqymjan Qoshqarbaev, a Soviet Kazakh soldier who was among the first to plant a Soviet flag atop the Reichstag building
  - Mikhail Petrovich Minin, a Soviet Russian soldier who was with Qoshqarbaev at the Reichstag building
- Meliton Varlamis Kantaria, a Soviet Georgian soldier who is credited with planting a Soviet flag atop the Reichstag building
  - Alexei Prokopievich Berest, a Soviet Ukrainian soldier who is credited with planting a Soviet flag atop the Reichstag building with Kantaria
  - Mikhail Alekseyevich Yegorov, A Soviet Russian soldier who is credited with planting a Soviet flag atop the Reichstag building with Kantaria and Berest
