= Anatoli Ivanov =

Anatoli Ivanov may refer to:

- Anatoly Blatov (born Ivanov, 1914–1988), Soviet diplomat and Communist Party official
- Anatoli Ivanov (writer) (1928–1999), Soviet writer
- Anatoli Viktorovich Ivanov (born 1972), Russian footballer with FC Pskov-747
- Anatoli Ivanov (footballer, born 1940), Russian football player and coach
- Anatoly Ivanov (rower) (born 1950), Soviet Olympic rower
- Anatoli Ivanov (musician) (1934–2012), Russian solo-timpanist and percussionist with the Saint Petersburg Philharmonic Orchestra
- Anatoly Ivanov (politician, born 1950), Russian politician and former chairman of the State Council of the Republic of Adygea
- Anatoly Ivanov (politician, born 1960), Russian member of the State Duma
- Anatoli Ivanov (1936-2000), Soviet actor in Amphibian Man and The Secret of the Iron Door
- Anatoli Aleksandrovich Ivanov (1942–2000), Soviet test pilot, Hero of the Russian Federation
- Anatoli Ivanov (born 1980), French / Russian director of Kvadrat documentary feature film
