= Raising a Flag over the Reichstag =

1945 photograph by Yevgeny Khaldei

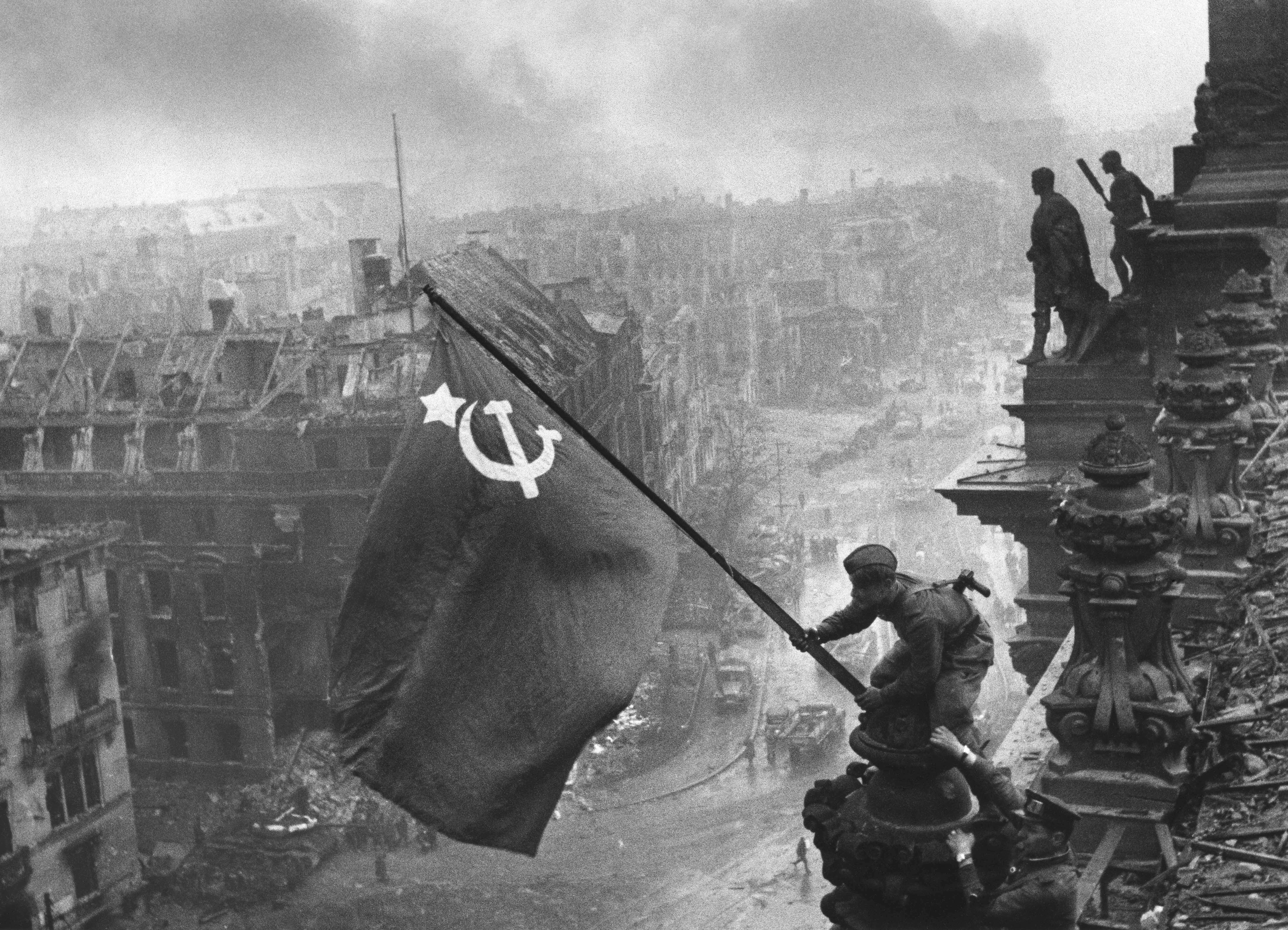
Raising a Flag over the Reichstag, by Yevgeny Khaldei (2 May 1945).

Raising a Flag over the Reichstag (Russian: Знамя Победы над Рейхстагом, romanized: Znamya Pobedy nad Reykhstagom) is a World War II photograph that symbolizes the Soviet Union's victory over Nazi Germany during the Battle in Berlin. Taken on 2 May 1945, it shows two Soviet soldiers planting a Soviet flag atop the Reichstag building, which was home to the Nazi pseudo-parliament. It was reprinted in thousands of publications and came to be regarded around the world as one of the most significant and recognizable images of World War II. Owing to the secrecy of Soviet media, the identities of the men in the photograph were often disputed, as was that of the photographer Yevgeny Khaldei.

== Background ==
The Battle of Berlin was the final major offensive of the European theatre of World War II and was designated the Berlin Strategic Offensive Operation by the Soviet Union. (Note: The last offensive of the European war was actually the Prague Offensive on 6–11 May 1945, when the Red Army, with the help of Polish, Romanian, and Czechoslovak forces defeated the parts of Army Group Center which continued to resist in Czechoslovakia. There were a number of minor battles and skirmishes involving small bodies of men, but no other large scale fighting that resulted in the death of thousands of people. (See The end of World War II in Europe for details on these final days of the war.)) Starting on 16 April 1945, the Red Army breached the German front as a result of the Vistula–Oder offensive and rapidly advanced westward through Germany, as fast as 30–40 kilometres a day. The offensive culminated in the battle in Berlin, which lasted from late 20 April 1945 until 2 May and was one of the bloodiest battles in history.

Erected in 1894, the Reichstag building, the historic seat of the German national legislature, was among the most recognizable buildings in Germany, with architecture considered magnificent for its time. The building contributed much to German history and was considered by the Red Army to be the symbol of their fascist enemy. To the Nazis, however, the Reichstag was instead a symbol of the weaknesses of democracy and representative government. It was severely damaged in the Reichstag fire of 1933, and by 1945 had been closed for 12 years, essentially the entirety of the Nazi reign; all subsequent meetings of the Reichstag legislature (which grew increasingly infrequent in the years following the fire as Nazi decision-making was centralized with Hitler and his cabinet) had been convened at the nearby Kroll Opera House instead. After fierce combat within its walls, the Soviets finally captured the Reichstag on 2 May 1945.

== Events ==
=== Initial attempts to symbolize victory ===
Despite the fact that the Reichstag was not used by the Nazis for the vast majority of their rule, the Soviet Union saw the building as symbolic of, and at the heart of, Nazi Germany. For them, it was arguably the most symbolic target in Berlin. The events surrounding the flag-raising are mired in controversy due to the confusion of the fight at the building. Initially, two planes dropped several large red banners on the roof that appeared to have caught on the bombed-out dome. Additionally, a number of reports had reached headquarters that two parties, M. M. Bondar from the 380th Rifle Regiment and Captain V. N. Makov of the 756th, might have been able to hoist a flag during the day of 30 April. These reports were received by Marshal G. K. Zhukov, who issued an announcement stating that his troops had captured the Reichstag and hoisted a flag. However, when correspondents arrived, they found no Soviets in the building, rather they were pinned down outside by German fire. There were several documented accounts of who was the first to put a flag on the Reichstag. Rakhimzhan Qoshqarbaev and Grigory Bulatov reportedly mounted the flag at 14:25. However, the flag was allegedly placed earlier in the window of the second floor by Bulatov and Viktor Provotorov, but it was decided it was too low, so Qoshqarbaev and Bulatov moved it higher. Another group, M. Minin, G. Zagitov, A. Lisimenko, and A. Bobrov, climbed to the rooftop and mounted the flag on the sculpture "Goddess of Victory" located on the western pediment of the Reichstag at about 22:30. Soon two more groups placed flags: one at the "Goddess of Victory," another at the sculpture group "Germania." The most famous flag from the photo was raised at about 3 am. It was the only one to survive the subsequent shelling of the Reichstag.

=== Taking of the photograph on 2 May 1945 ===
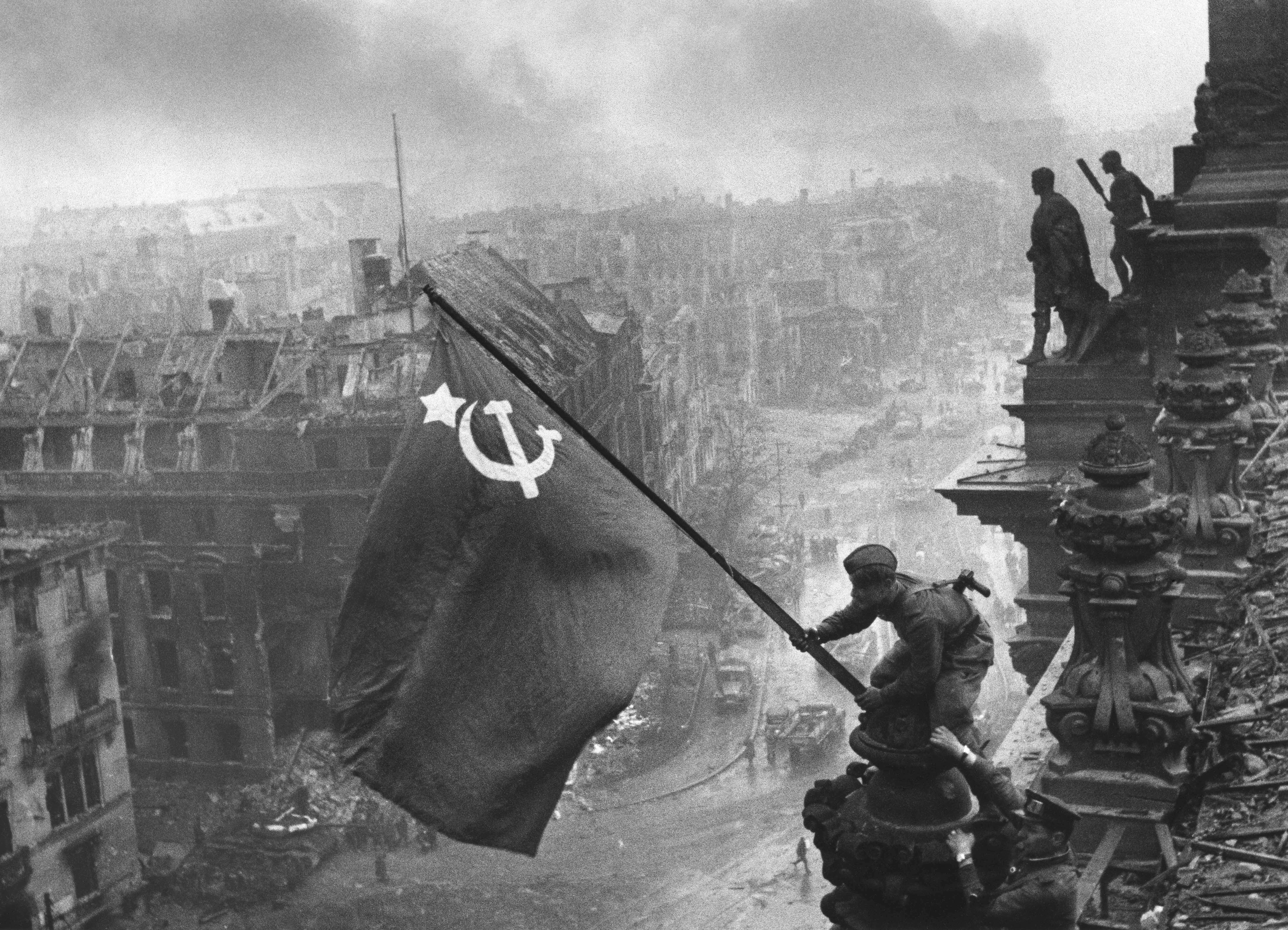

The original photo (top) was altered (bottom) by editing the watch on Ismailov's right wrist.

The Red Army gained control of the entire building on 2 May. On 2 May 1945, Khaldei scaled the now pacified Reichstag to take his picture. He was carrying with him a large flag, sewn from three tablecloths for this very purpose by his uncle. The official story would later be told that two hand-picked soldiers, the Georgian Meliton Kantaria (Note: Alternately spelled: Kantariya, M. V. Kantaria, Meliton Kantaria) and the Russian Mikhail Yegorov, (Note: Alternately spelled: M. V. Yegorov, M. A. Yegorov, Mikhail Iegorev) were the first to raise the official Soviet flag known as the Victory Banner over the Reichstag, and this photograph was used as depicting the event. Some authors state that for political reasons the subjects of the photograph were changed and the actual man to hoist the flag was Aleksei Kovalev. However, according to Khaldei himself, when he arrived at the Reichstag, he simply asked the soldiers who happened to be passing by to help with the staging of the photoshoot; the one who was attaching the flag was 18-year-old Private Kovalev from Burlin, Kazakh Soviet Socialist Republic and the two others were Abdulkhakim Ismailov from the Dagestan Autonomous Soviet Socialist Republic and Leonid Gorychev (also mentioned as Aleksei Goryachev) from Minsk. The photograph was taken with a Leica III rangefinder camera with a 35mm f3.5 lens.

== Aftermath ==
The photo was published 13 May 1945 in the Ogonyok magazine. While many photographers before Khaldei took pictures of flags on the roof, it was Khaldei's image that stuck.

=== Editing controversy ===
Raising a flag over the Reichstag by Yevgeny Khaldei, but with smoke added.

After taking the symbolic photo, Khaldei quickly returned to Moscow. He further edited the image at the request of the editor-in-chief of the Ogonyok, who noticed that Senior Sergeant Abdulkhakim Ismailov, who is supporting the flag-bearer, was wearing two watches, which could imply he had looted one of them. Using a needle, Khaldei removed the watch from the right wrist. Later, it was claimed that the extra watch was actually an Adrianov compass and that Khaldei, in order to avoid controversy, doctored the photo to remove the watch from Ismailov's right wrist. He also increased contrast in the overall print, and added smoke in the background, montaging it from another negative from the entire roll of film he shot, to make the scene more dramatic, and with the result that the image, with extra sky added, becomes more square in format.

=== Copyright status ===
Because Khaldei took the photo as part of his work for TASS, the copyright of the photo belongs to TASS, not Khaldei. According to Russian copyright law, works created by legal entities have a copyright term of 70 years after publication (or creation, if the work was not published before 3 August 1993). Since Raising a Flag over the Reichstag was published in 1945, its Russian copyright expired on 1 January 2016. This was confirmed in 2015 in the court session between the heiress of the photographer, his daughter Anna Khaldei, and the publishing house Veche about the use of the photograph in the book За порогом Победы (Behind the Threshold of the Victory) by Arsen Benikovich Martirosyan, where ITAR-TASS was included as a third party without a separate interest.

== Gallery ==
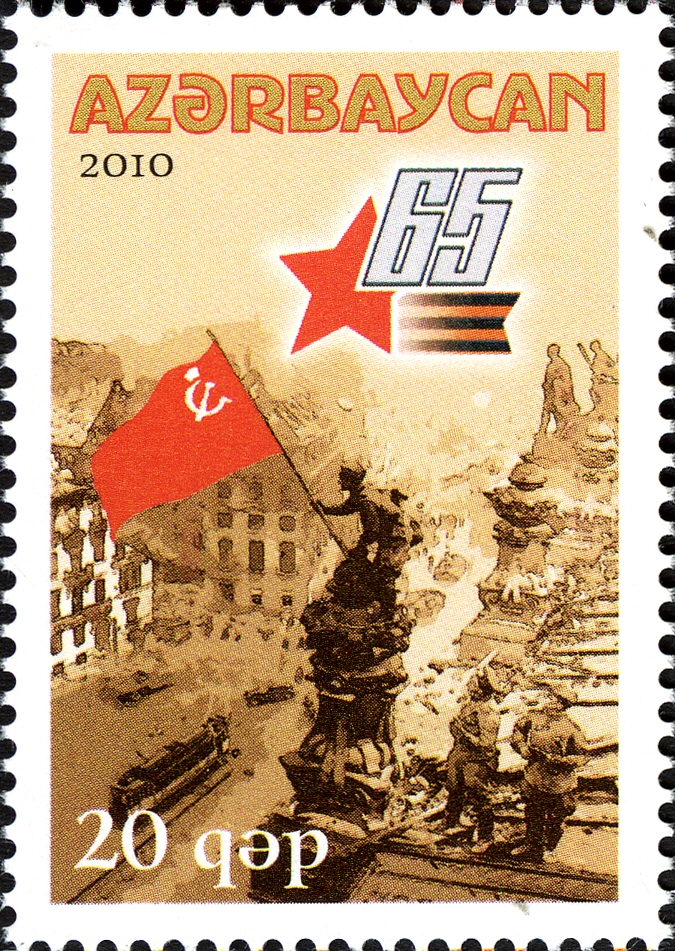
An Azerbaijani stamp commemorating the 65th anniversary of victory in the Great Patriotic War

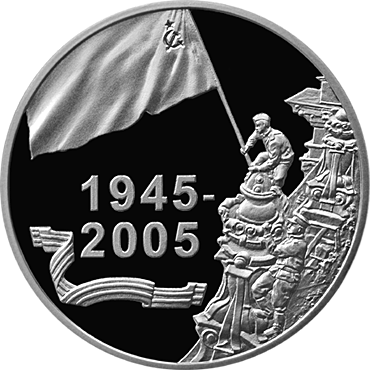
Commemorative Silver coin from Belarus depicting iconic imagery

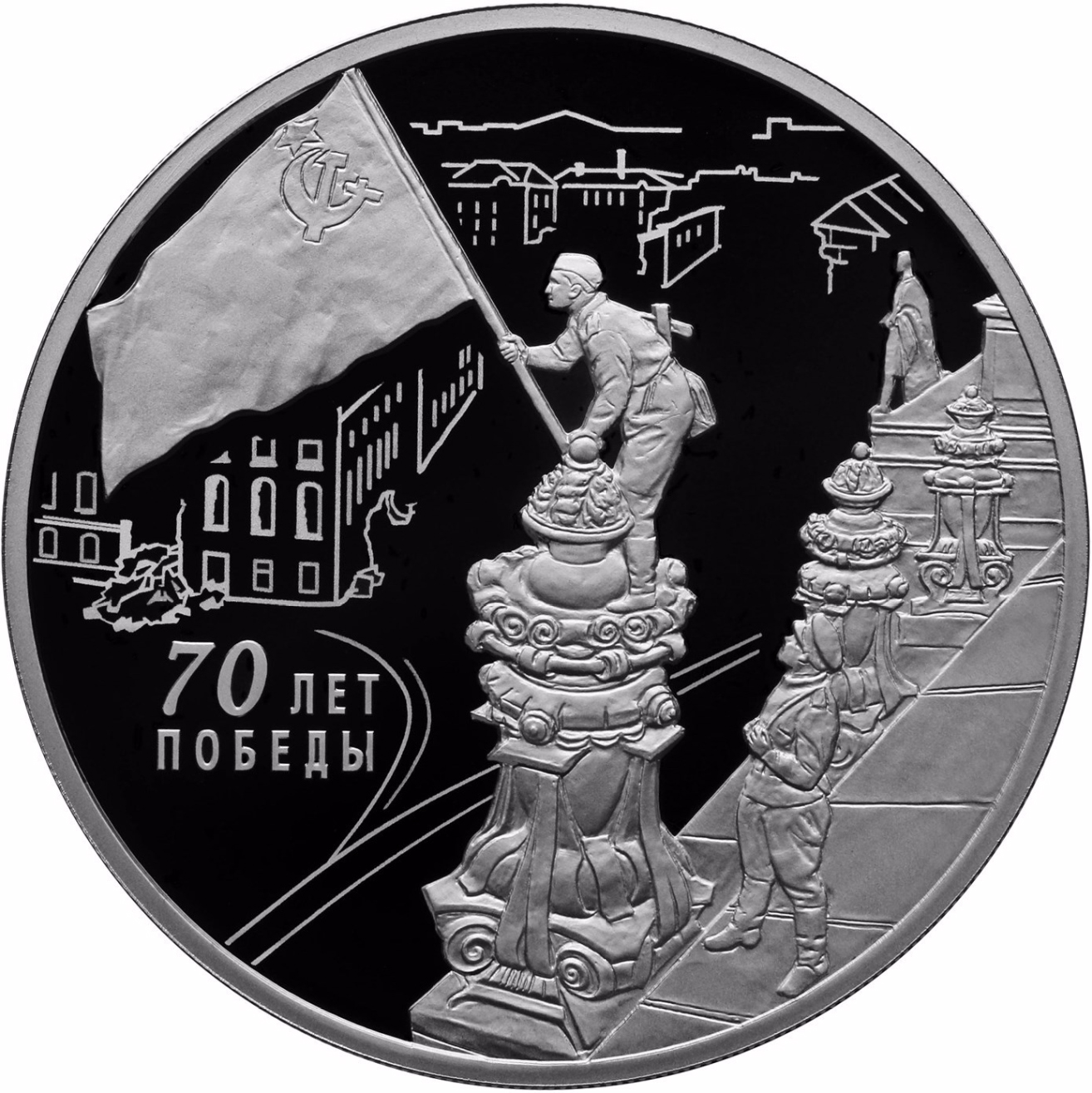
Commemorative coin issued by the Bank of Russia for the 70th anniversary of Victory Day

Computer recreation of the Soviet flag depicted in the photo

== See also ==
- Victory Banner of the Soviet Union
- List of photographs considered the most important
  - Raising the Flag at Fort Sumter (14 April 1865, United States)
  - Raising the Flag on Iwo Jima (23 February 1945, United States)
  - Raising the Flag on the Three-Country Cairn (27 April 1945, Finland)
  - Raising of the Ink Flag (10 March 1949, Israel)
  - Raising the Flag at Ground Zero (11 September 2001, United States)

== Bibliography ==
Notes

References

- Adams, Simon (2008). The Eastern Front (2008 ed.). The Rosen Publishing Group. ISBN 978-1-4042-1862-8. – Total pages: 48
- Antill, Peter; Dennis, Peter (2005). Berlin 1945: End of the Thousand Year Reich (when ed.). Osprey Publishing. ISBN 1-84176-915-0. – Total pages: 96
- Baumann, Von Doc (3 January 2010). "Dramatische Rauchwolcken" (in German). Der Spiegel. Archived from the original on 12 January 2012.
- Beevor, Antony (2003). Berlin: The Downfall 1945. London: Penguin Books. ISBN 978-0-14-028696-0.
- Broekmeyer, M. J. (2004). Stalin, the Russians, and their war: 1941-1945 (2004 ed.). University of Wisconsin Press. ISBN 0-299-19594-5. – Total pages: 315
- Conquest, Robert (1991). The Great Terror: A Reassessment (1991 ed.). Oxford University Press US. ISBN 0-19-507132-8. – Total pages: 584
- Dallas, Gregor (2006). 1945: The War That Never Ended (2006 ed.). Yale University Press. ISBN 0-300-11988-7. – Total pages: 792
- Lenin, Vladimir I. (1929). Collected Works of V.I. Lenin. Vol. XX. New York: International Publishers.
- Lindemann, Albert S. (2000). Esau's Tears: Modern anti-semitism and the rise of the Jews (2000 ed.). Cambridge University Press. ISBN 0-521-79538-9. – Total pages: 568
- Lucas, Dean (28 February 2010). "Flag on the Reichstag". FamousPictures.org. Archived from the original on 7 July 2013.
- Sontheimer, Michael (5 July 2008). "The Art of Soviet Propaganda: Iconic Red Army Reichstag Photo Faked". Der Spiegel. Archived from the original on 11 May 2012.
- Tissier, Tony Le (1999). Race for the Reichstag: the 1945 Battle for Berlin (1999 ed.). Routledge. ISBN 0-7146-4929-5. – Total pages: 265
- Walkowitz, Daniel J.; Knauer, Lisa Maya (2004). Memory and the impact of political transformation in public space Radical perspectives (when ed.). Duke University Press. ISBN 0-8223-3364-3. – Total pages: 326
- "За него Геринг получил по шее" ["Göring received a neckslap because of that man". Interview with Anna Haldey]. Interview (in Russian). Nizhny Novgorod: Moskovskij Komsomolets. 12 May 2010.
- "Iconic WWII photo honored at Berlin exhibit". USA Today. Associated Press. 15 June 2008.
- "Iconic WWII photo staged". USA Today. Associated Press. 16 June 2008.
- "The Art of Soviet Propaganda Iconic Red Army Reichstag Photo Faked - SPIEGEL ONLINE". Spiegel. 7 May 2008. Archived from the original on 11 May 2012.
- "Muere el último sobreviviente de la foto más famosa del fin de la II Guerra" (in Spanish). La Tercera. 18 February 2010. Archived from the original on 4 March 2016.
- "Soviet soldier pictured in iconic 1945 Reichstag photo dies". The Guardian. Associated Press. 17 February 2010.
