= Alexei Berest =

Red Army soldier who Raised the Victory Banner in Berlin

Alexei Berest HOU OGS
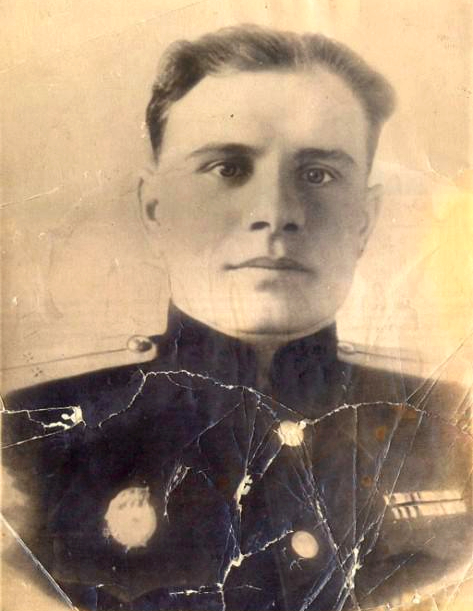
- Berest c. 1945
- Born: 9 March 1921; Horiaistivka, Lebedinsky Uyezd, Kharkov Governorate, Ukrainian SSR
- Died: 4 November 1970 (aged 49); Rostov-on-Don, Russian SFSR, Soviet Union
- Burial place: Alexander Cemetery, Rostov-on-Don
- Military career
- Allegiance: Soviet Union (1939–1948)
- Service years: 1939–1948
- Rank: Lieutenant
- Conflicts: Winter War; World War II
- Awards: Order of the Red Banner; Order of the Patriotic War 1st class Order of the Red Star; Medal "For the Victory over Germany in the Great Patriotic War 1941–1945"; Hero of Ukraine (posthumous); Hero of the Russian Federation (posthumous)

Alexei Prokopievich Berest (Russian: Алексей Прокопьевич Берест; Ukrainian: Олексій Прокопович Берест, romanized: Oleksii Prokopovych Berest; 9 March 1921 – 4 November 1970) was a Soviet political officer and one of the three Red Army soldiers credited with having hoisted the Victory Banner over the Reichstag.

== Biography ==
=== Early life ===
Born to an impoverished Ukrainian family, seven of Berest's fifteen siblings died prematurely. He was orphaned when eleven years old, and raised by his older sisters. From the age of sixteen, he worked as a tractor driver. Berest volunteered into the Red Army in October 1939 and took part in the Soviet-Finnish War as a signaller. When Germany invaded the Soviet Union, he was sent to the front once more. In March 1943, while stationed in the Volkhov Front, Corporal Berest joined the Communist Party. In December, he was sent to the Leningrad Military-Political School (Which at the time was located at Shuya, after being evacuated) and trained as a commissar. After graduation in September 1944, Lieutenant Berest was assigned as Captain Stepan Neustroev's deputy for political affairs (Zampolit) in the 1st Battalion of the 150th Rifle Division's 756th Regiment.

=== Battle of Berlin ===
On 30 April 1945, after long days of street combat in Berlin, the 150th Division attacked the Reichstag. On 1 May, at about 03:00, Berest and two scouts – Meliton Kantaria and Mikhail Yegorov – hoisted one of nine Soviet flags given to the division's commanders on the building's dome, fastening it to Wilhelm I's statue. Although not the first to be placed, the flag was eventually proclaimed as the Victory Banner. Later, posing as a Colonel, he negotiated with the German garrison of the Reichstag on the terms of their surrender. He received the Order of the Red Banner for his actions.

=== Post-war years ===
In May 1945, Neustroev, Kantaria and many others who were involved in the Reichstag assault were awarded the title Hero of the Soviet Union. For unknown reasons, (Note: The various sources cited in this article alternatively asserted that this was due to Berest's Ukrainian heritage, Marshal Georgy Zhukov's dislike for political officers or a confrontation with a Smersh officer several days before the battle. No conclusive data could be found on the subject.) Berest did not attain the award and his part in the operation was silenced. In 1948, he was discharged from the army and began working in the regional cinema department of Rostov-on-Don. In 1953, he was convicted of embezzlement and sent to ten years in prison, of which he served five. After being released, he was employed in the local Rostselmash factory as a common laborer. On 3 November 1970, Berest was run over by a train as he saved a child who strayed on the railway. He died of his injuries in the early hours of the following day.

== Legacy ==
He was posthumously granted the title of Hero of Ukraine on 6 May 2005.

On 17 July 2025, Russian president Vladimir Putin awarded him with the posthumous title of Hero of the Russian Federation.

== Honours and awards ==
- Medal "For the Victory over Germany in the Great Patriotic War 1941–1945"
- Order of the Red Banner
- Order of the Patriotic War, 1st class
- Order of the Red Star
- Order of the "Gold Star" Hero of Ukraine – for military valour in the Great Patriotic War of 1941–1945, the personal courage and heroism displayed in the Berlin operation and installation of the Victory Banner over the Reichstag (6 May 2005, posthumously)
- Hero of the Russian Federation (17 July 2025, posthumously)
