= Adrianov =

Adrianov (Russian: Адриа́нов; masculine) or Adrianova (Адриа́нова; feminine) is a Russian last name. Variants of this last name include Andriankin/Andriankina (Андриа́нкин/Андриа́нкина), Andrianov/Andrianova (Андриа́нов/Андриа́нова), Andrin/Andrina (А́ндрин/А́ндрина), Andreyash (Андрея́ш), Andriyashev/Andriyasheva (Андрия́шев/Андрия́шева), and Andriyashin/Andriyashina (Андрия́шин/Андрия́шина).

All these last name derive from various forms of the male first name Adrian, which comes from Latin Adrianus, meaning an inhabitant of Adria (cf. Adriatic Sea). The forms starting with "An-" have likely formed by analogy with the names like Andrey and Andron.

People with the last name

- Alexander Adrianov, Governor-General of Moscow, Russia in 1908–1915
- Dmitry Adrianov, leader of the Balakovo branch of the Federation of Jewish Communities of the CIS
- Irene Adrianova, 2004 darts World Master
- Samuil Adrianov, ballet dancer; first husband of Elizaveta Gerdt
- Vladimir Adrianov, designer of the Adrianov compass used by the Russian Imperial Army
- Yevdokia Adrianova, a peasant Russian woman involved with the re-appearance of Our Lady Derzhavnaya, an 18th-century Russian icon
