= Alexander Cemetery =

Alexander Cemetery may refer to:

- Alexander Cemetery (Rostov-on-Don), a cemetery in Rostov-on-Don, Russia
- Alexander Cemetery (Hebbardsville, Ohio), United States
- Alexander Cemetery (Madera, Pennsylvania), United States
- Alexander Cemetery (Carterville, Missouri), United States
- Alexander Cemetery (Bow Junction, New Hampshire), United States
- Alexander Cemetery (Walnut, Mississippi), United States
- Alexander Cemetery in Manifest, Louisiana, United States
