= 1965 Moscow Victory Day Parade =

Russian military parade

The 1965 Moscow Victory Day Parade (Russian: Парад Победы, romanized: Parad Pobedy) was held on 9 May 1965 to commemorate the 20th anniversary of the capitulation of Nazi Germany in 1945. The parade marks the Soviet Union's victory in the Great Patriotic War.

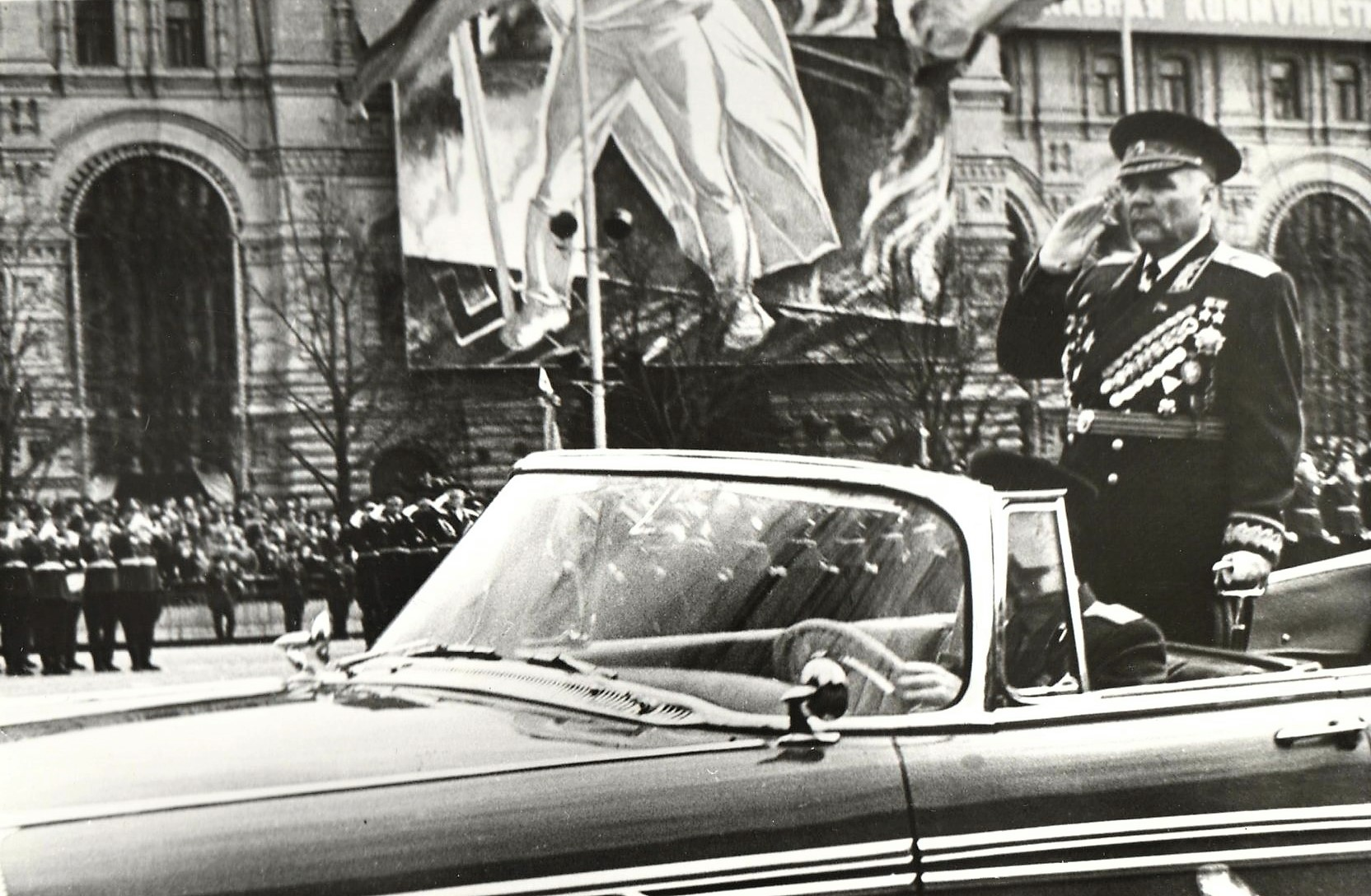
Soviet defense Minister Marshal Rodion Malinovsky takes the salute during the military parade, 9 May 1965.

Prior to 1965 Victory Day was not a major holiday and parades were not held, with the exception of the 1945 Victory Day Parade. The Victory Parade of 1965 was the second made after 1945 Victory Day Parade. After this parade next would be held recently in 1985. It also coincided with the first Victory Day Parades to be held in Soviet cities all over the country, with parades being held for the first time in cities such as Vladivostok and Kishinev.

== Events ==
The parade was observed by Soviet leaders from Lenin's Mausoleum. Major political figures attending were General Secretary of the Communist Party Leonid Brezhnev, Chairman of the Council of Ministers Alexei Kosygin, and Minister of Defence Marshal Rodion Malinovsky among other leaders in the Soviet government. 12 delegations from socialist nations such as the People's Republic of Bulgaria, Cuba, and North Vietnam attended the parade, with the dignitaries including East German Prime Minister Willi Stoph, Czechoslovak politburo member Zdeněk Fierlinger, Algerian politburo member Houari Boumédiène and Communist Party of Spain Chairman Dolores Ibarruri. The parade was commanded by Moscow Military District Commander General of the Army Afanasy Beloborodov. It was on that very parade that Mikhail Yegorov and Meliton Kantaria, the then two surviving raisers of the Victory Banner, escorted it as the color party of the banner marched past the dignitaries on Red Square with retired Col. Konstantin Samsonov carrying the banner.

On this parade what is now the 1st Honor Guard Company of the 154th Preobrazhensky Independent Commandant's Regiment made its parade debut. Several of the then living officers from the war bearing the rank of Marshal of the Soviet Union, including Georgy Zhukov, the parade inspector of the original 1945 Victory Parade, attended the event.

== Full order of the 1965 parade ==
Following the limousine carrying General of the Army Beloborodov, the parade march past in the following manner:

=== Military bands ===
- Massed Military Bands of the Moscow Military District

=== Ground column ===
- Victory Banner Color Guard
- Honor Guard Company
- Corps of Drums of the Moscow Military Music College
- V. I. Lenin Military Political Academy
- Military Artillery Academy "Felix Dzerzhinsky"
- Military Armored Forces Academy
- Military Engineering Academy
- Military Academy of Chemical Defense and Control
- Yuri Gagarin Air Force Academy
- Zhukovsky Air Force Engineering Academy
- Moscow Military High Command Training School "Supreme Soviet of the Russian SFSR"
- Moscow Border Guards Institute of the Border Defence Forces of the KGB "Moscow City Council"
- OMSDON Ind. Motorized Division of the Internal Troops of the Ministry of Internal Affairs of the USSR "Felix Dzerzhinsky"
- Suvorov Military School
- Nakhimov Naval School

Almost a third of the parade participants were veterans of the war.
