= Andringa =

Andringa is a surname. Notable people with the surname include:

- Casey Andringa (born 1995), American freestyle skier
- Joris Andringa (1635–1676), Dutch naval officer
- Robbert Andringa (born 1990), Dutch volleyball player

== See also ==
- Andrina (disambiguation)
