= Timofey Tokarev =

- Тимофей Токарев
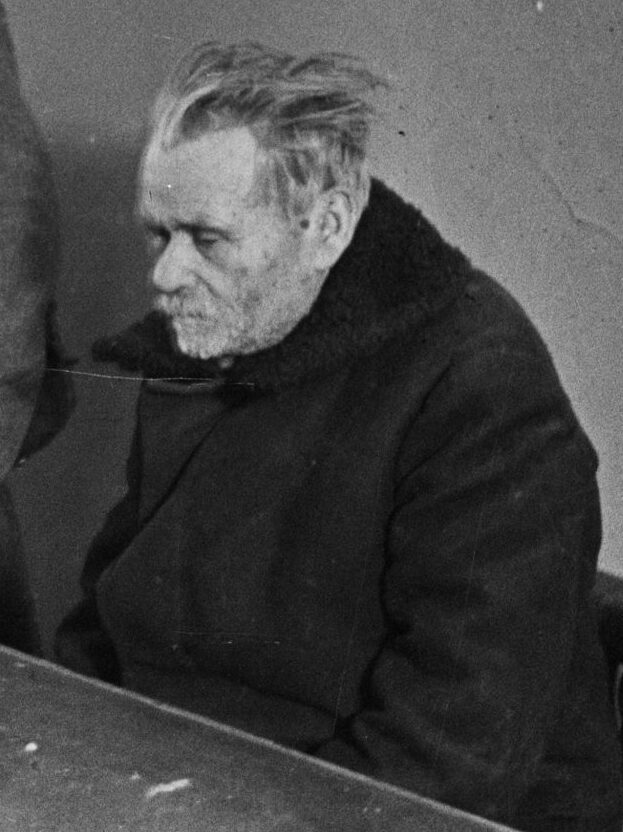

Burgomaster of German-occupied Kerch
- In office November 1941 – 29 December 1941

Personal details
- Born: 1869
- Died: 1941 (aged 71–72) Kerch, Crimean ASSR

Timofey Vasilyevich Tokarev (Russian: Тимофей Васильевич Токарев; 1869–1942, Kerch, Crimean ASSR) was the mayor of Kerch under the Armed Forces of South Russia in 1919 and mayor (burgomaster) during the first German occupation of Kerch in November–December 1941, a collaborator. During the Kerch–Feodosia Offensive, he failed to escape, was captured in Kerch, tried for treason, and executed.

Born in 1869. In 1919 during the Russian Civil War, under the rule of the Armed Forces of South Russia, he was mayor of Kerch. He survived the Red Terror in Crimea. During Soviet rule, he was a disenfranchised person. In November 1941, the Germans, who occupied Kerch after the evacuation of the 51st Army, offered 72-year-old Tokarev the position of mayor. In his post, he compiled lists of enemies of the occupation regime and organized a census of Jews, who were later executed in the Bagerovsky Ditch. He confiscated "surplus" food from Kerch residents for the Wehrmacht. After the Soviet landing during the Kerch-Feodosia Offensive, he failed to escape and was captured, interrogated, tried, and executed.

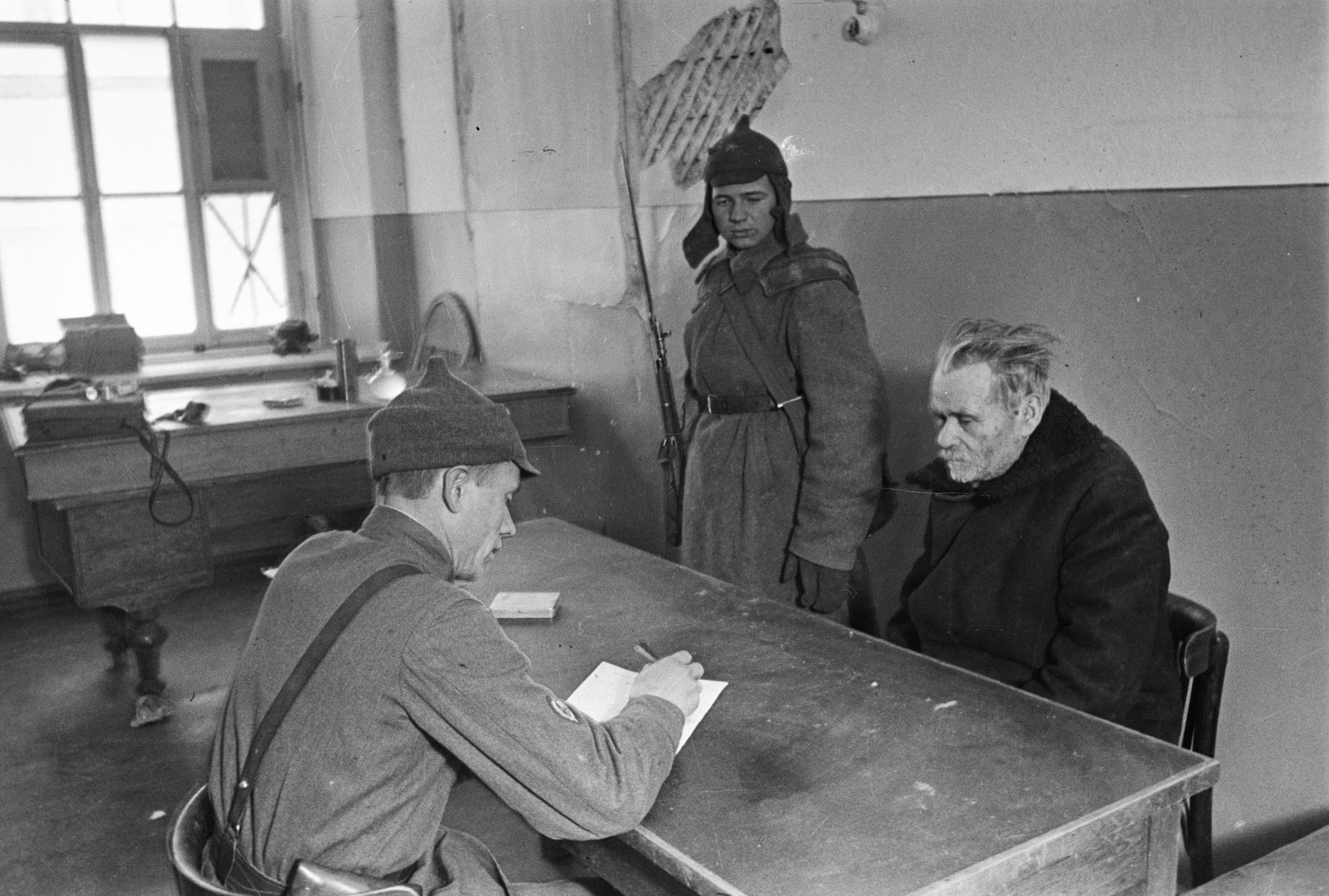
Investigation of Tokarev by the NKVD, photography by Yevgeny Khaldei

The interrogations were conducted by NKVD investigator Zhdanov.

Since the liberation of relatively large cities such as Feodosia and Kerch was rare in 1941 and early 1942, as was the capture of collaborators with the German occupiers, Soviet propaganda attached great importance to the coverage of the arrest and trial of the burgomasters of Feodosia, Vasily Gruzinov, and Kerch, Timofey Tokarev. These events were covered independently by Izvestia and Krasnaya Zvezda correspondent Konstantin Simonov, TASS photojournalist Yevgeny Khaldei, and a film crew from the Tbilisi Film Studio's newsreel sector, consisting of director V. S. Mitrofanov, cameraman L. Sh. Arzumanov, and assistant cameraman V. V. Kilosanidze, under the direction of senior political instructor of the Crimean Front's Political Directorate, P. M. Moiseyev, who filmed in Kerch from January 29 to February 8, 1942. In addition to photographs and film newsreels, several articles were published in the central and front-line press.
