= Raqymjan Qoshqarbaev =

Soviet soldier (1924–1988)

Rakhimzhan Qoshqarbaev
- Рақымжан Қошқарбаев; Raqımjan Qoşqarbaev
- Qoshqarbaev in 1945
- Born: 19 October 1924; Taytobe, Akmola Oblast, Kirghiz ASSR, Soviet Union
- Died: 10 August 1988 (aged 63); Alma-Ata, Kazakh SSR, Soviet Union
- Military career
- Allegiance: Soviet Union
- Branch: Red Army
- Rank: Lieutenant
- Unit: 674th Infantry Regiment
- Awards: Hero of Kazakhstan; Order of the Red Banner

Raqymjan Qoshqarbaev (Kazakh: Рақымжан Қошқарбаев, Raqımjan Qoşqarbaev; Russian: Рахимжан Кошкарбаев, romanized Rahimžan Koškarbaěv; 19 October 1924 – 10 August 1988) was a Soviet soldier who was the first to raise the flag of the Soviet Union at the Reichstag building in Berlin, placing it by a staircase in the opera hall after sneaking into the building. After nightfall Qoshqarbaev and several of his comrades raised the flag on the roof. However, because they had raised the flag in the night when it was too dark to take a photo, none of them were part of the iconic photo of Soviet soldiers raising the flag on 2 May. After the raising of the flag on 30 April it was shot down by German snipers shortly before the Wehrmacht briefly retook control of the building. However, by 2 May the Soviets retook control of the building and raised the flag again, bringing photographer Yevgeny Khaldei with them to capture a reenactment of the historic moment.

== Early life ==
Qoshqarbaev was born on 19 October 1924 to an ethnic Kazakh family in the village of Akmolinsk within the Kirghiz ASSR (later Kazakh SSR), currently located within the present-day city of Astana. His mother died in 1928 and he was eventually sent to an orphanage at the age of 13 after his father was repressed and declared an "enemy of the people" during the Great Purge in 1937. After completing seven years of secondary school he worked in a factory until he was allowed to join the Red Army.

== World War II ==
Immediately after the German invasion of the Soviet Union in 1941 Qoshqarbaev attempted to join the Red Army but was initially rejected because he was only sixteen years old at the time. He reapplied shortly before his eighteenth birthday in August 1942 and was sent for training in the city of Kokshetau, which he completed in 1943. He was then sent for officer training at the Tambov All-Commander Infantry School, which he graduated from with honors before being sent to the Eastern Front as a junior lieutenant in October 1944.

In 1945 Qoshqarbaev distinguished himself while leading a platoon on an assault on enemy defenses, located on the Western bank of the Oder River; on April 17, one day after breaking through the enemy bridgehead, he led his unit towards a river channel to establish a new bridgehead and continued the advance despite heavy resistance from Axis forces. After Soviet forces opened fire on approaching enemy forces Qoshqarbaev entered the water, led his unit in the perilous crossing, and proceeded to storm a German trench after reaching the western bank of the canal. During the heavy fighting of that engagement over 40 German soldiers were killed after the platoon seized three machine guns in hand-to-hand combat and opened fire on the remaining German soldiers in the trench. After taking over the trench they established a firing point and gunned down the remaining enemy combatants in the area. After Qoshqarbaev's success in the Oder offensive, his platoon became the first unit to cross the Spree river, doing so under heavy enemy fire. From the time of Oder crossing to when he raised the flag over the Reichstag in Berlin, his platoon killed over 200 German soldiers and held 184 of them hostage, took 27 high-caliber machine-guns, and obtained many other weapons that were once in the hands of enemy soldiers. By the end of the war, Qoshqarbaev had achieved the rank of lieutenant and was the commander of a reconnaissance platoon which belonged to the 674th Infantry Regiment in the 150th Infantry Division.

=== Raising the flag over the Reichstag ===
Qoshqarbaev initially placed the flag of the Soviet Union atop the staircase in front of the main entrance to the building on 30 April 1945 at 14:25 after sneaking into the building with another soldier, Grigory Bulatov. The flag was presented to the group of soldiers assigned to raising the flag over the building by a regimental commander; the meeting where the flag was given to them was held in Himmler's house. After Qoshqarbaev originally placed the flag in the entrance by the staircase under the watch of Ivan Klochkov they went on to place it atop the building; the soldiers then jumped out of a window and ran across the roof, but after coming under heavy fire they laid low on the roof for several hours and waited for the artillery fire to cease. While waiting for the opportunity to hoist up the flag Qoshqarbaev and Bulatov wrote their names and regiment numbers on the flag. After nightfall the artillery fire eventually died down and under the cover of darkness Mikhail Minin along with Aleksey Bobrov, Bulatov, and Qoshqarbaev raised the flag over the Reichstag. However, the flag was later shot down by German snipers. All participants in the event were nominated for the title Hero of the Soviet Union, but were instead awarded the Order of the Red Banner; none of them were present during the re-creation of the event in the photo Raising a Flag over the Reichstag taken on 2 May by Yevgeny Khaldei.

== Later life ==
After the war, Qoshqarbaev worked for the Ministry of Public Utilities until being appointed director of the Alma-Ata Hotel, remaining in the position for almost 20 years. Unlike another Kazakh hero of the war, Baurzhan Momyshuly, Qoshqarbaev was never awarded the title Hero of the Soviet Union, despite several petitions to Brezhnev from high-profile veterans of the war and other Kazakhs awarded the title of hero asking that Qoshqarbaev be declared a Hero of the Soviet Union. Many suspected the reason for his not receiving the award was the fact his father had been declared an enemy of the people, which was later proven by the release of the Republic of Kazakhstan President's Archives in 1994. Qoshqarbaev died in August 1988. Over a decade after his death he was posthumously declared a Hero of Kazakhstan on 7 May 1999 by decree of the President Nursultan Nazarbayev. (Note: Most sources indicate Qoshqarbayev was declared a Hero of Kazakhstan on 7 May 1999, although one source indicates he was awarded the title in 2001)

== See also ==
- Aliya Moldagulova
- Manshuk Mametova
- Khiuaz Dospanova
- Bauyrzhan Momyshuly
- Raising a Flag over the Reichstag
- Abdulkhakim Ismailov, an Ingush Soviet soldier who raised the second flag in the Reichstag that was later captured
