= Andriyashin =

Andriyashin (Russian: Андрия́шин; masculine) or Andriyashina (Андрия́шина; feminine) is a Russian last name, a variant of Adrianov.

People with the last name

- Nikita Andriyashin, 2006 Samsung Global Scholarship Program recipient
