= Andriyashev =

Andriyashev (Russian: Андрия́шев; masculine) or Andriyasheva (Андрия́шева; feminine) is a Russian last name, a variant of Adrianov.

People with the last name

- Anatoly Andriyashev (1910–2009), Soviet Russian marine biologist
