= Mikhail Yegorov =

Soldier who raised flag on Reichstag, Hero of the Soviet union (1923–1975)

- Михаил Алексеевич Егоров
- Yegorov in 1945
- Born: 5 May 1923; Yermoshenki, Smolensky Uyezd, Smolensk Governorate, Russian SFSR, Soviet Union
- Died: 20 June 1975 (aged 52); Demidovsky District, Soviet Union
- Military career
- Allegiance: Soviet Union
- Branch: Red Army
- Service years: 1944–1947
- Rank: Sergeant
- Unit: 150th Rifle Division
- Conflicts: World War II
- Awards: Hero of the Soviet Union

Mikhail Alekseyevich Yegorov (Russian: Михаил Алексеевич Егоров; 5 May 1923 – 20 June 1975) was a sergeant of the Soviet Army who, along with Meliton Kantaria and Alexei Berest, was one of the three soldiers credited with having hoisted the Victory Banner over the Reichstag on 1 May 1945 after the Battle of Berlin.

Yegorov joined the partisans during the Nazi occupation, then enlisted in the Red Army in late 1944 as an infantry scout. He worked at a dairy farm after leaving the army. In 1975, he was killed in a traffic accident at the age of 52.

== Honours and awards ==
- Hero of the Soviet Union
- Order of Lenin
- Order of the Red Banner
- Order of the Patriotic War 2nd class
- Order of the Red Star
- Order of Glory 3rd class
- Medal "Partisan of the Patriotic War" 1st class
- Jubilee Medal "For Military Valour in Commemoration of the 100th Anniversary since the Birth of Vladimir Il'ich Lenin"
- Medal "For the Victory over Germany in the Great Patriotic War 1941–1945"
- Jubilee Medal "Twenty Years of Victory in the Great Patriotic War 1941-1945"
- Jubilee Medal "Thirty Years of Victory in the Great Patriotic War 1941-1945"
- Medal "For the Capture of Berlin"
- Jubilee Medal "50 Years of the Armed Forces of the USSR"

== See also ==
- Raising the Flag on Iwo Jima
- Meliton Kantaria
- Alexei Berest
- Mikhail Minin
- Abdulkhakim Ismailov
- Rakhimzhan Qoshqarbaev
