= Andrina =

Andrina may refer to:

- Andrina, feminine version of the Russian last name Andrin
- Andrina (film), 1981 film by Bill Forsyth
- Andrina (given name):
  - Andrina Brogden, contestant on Season 13 of American Idol
  - Andrina Johnston, mother of Vagaland (1909–1973), Shetland poet
  - Engelina (b. 1978), full name Engelina Andrina Larsen, Danish singer and songwriter
  - Andrina Curry, a character in the DC Comics universe
