= Andrianov =

Andrianov (Russian: Андриа́нов; masculine) or Andrianova (Андриа́нова; feminine) is a Russian last name, a variant of Adrianov.

== People with the last name ==
- Alexey Andrianov, director of the 2012 Russian movie Spy
- Anatoli N. Andrianov (1936–2020), Russian mathematician
- Nadija Hordijenko Andrianova (1921–1998), Ukrainian writer
- Nikolai Andrianov (Nikolay Andrianov) (1952–2011), Soviet/Russian Olympic gymnast
- Olga Andrianova (born 1949), Soviet Olympic athlete, discus throw at the 1976 Summer Olympics
- Olga Andrianova (curler) (1952–2022), Russian curler and coach
- Tatyana Andrianova (b. 1979), Russian middle-distance runner
- Vasily Andrianov (politician) (1902–1978), Soviet politician
- Vasily Ivanovich Andrianov (1920–1999), Soviet aviation commander

== Toponyms ==
- Andrianov (rural locality), a rural locality (a khutor) in Ostrovyanskoye Rural Settlement of Orlovsky District in Rostov Oblast

== See also ==
- Andrianovo, several rural localities in Russia
