= List of Heroes of the Russian Federation (I) =

This is a list of people who have been awarded the title Hero of the Russian Federation.

It has been awarded more than 970 times, of which more than 440 were posthumously.

== List of Heroes of the Russian Federation ==
•Daniel Harris

Template parameters
Parameter	Description	Type	Status
No parameters specified

- Timur Ibragimov (ru)
- Anatoly Ivanishin
- Aleksandr Ivanov (captain) (ru)
- Aleksandr Ivanov (senior lieutenant) (ru)
- Anatoly Ivanov (ru)
- Andrey Ivanov (ru)
- Valery Ivanov (ru)
- Zuriko Ivanov (ru)
- Igor Ivanov
- Pyotr Igashov (ru)
- Yuri Igitov (ru)
- Nikolai Ignatov (ru)
- Aleksandr Igoshin (ru)
- Roman Igoshin (ru)
- Abdulla Izhaev
- Oleg Ilyin (ru)
- Arzulum Ilyazov (ru)
- Georgy Ionin (ru)
- Gennady Ireykin (ru)
- Mutey Isaev (ru)
- Nikolai Isaev (ru)
- Oleg Isaev (ru)
- Gevork Isakhanyan (ru)
- Abdulkhakim Ismailov
- Muslim Ismailov (ru)
- Rafik Ikhsanov (ru)

== See also ==
- Awards and decorations of the Russian Federation
- Awards and Emblems of the Ministry of Defense of the Russian Federation
- Awards of the Ministry of Internal Affairs of Russia
- Awards of the Federal Security Service of the Russian Federation
- Awards of the Federal Protective Service of the Russian Federation
- Awards of the Ministry for Emergency Situations of Russia
- Honorary titles of Russia
