= Aleksey Kovalev =

Soviet soldier (1925–1997)

Aleksei Kovalev
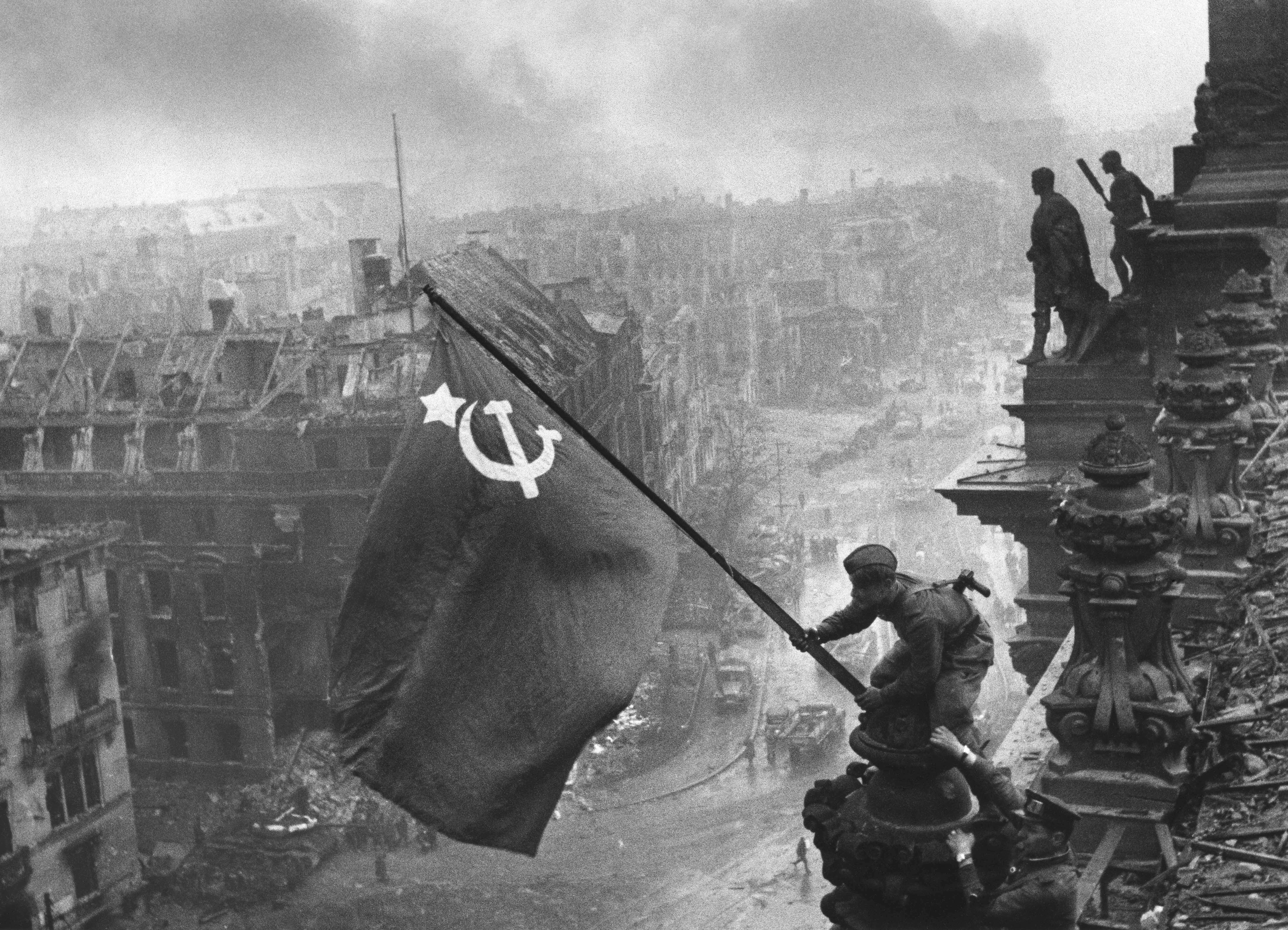
- Raising a Flag over the Reichstag, by Yevgeny Khaldei, 1945
- Born: Aleksei Leontievich Kovalev; 10 May 1925; Burlin, Kazakh Soviet Socialist Republic, Soviet Union
- Died: 7 September 1997 (aged 72) Kyiv, Ukraine
- Allegiance: Soviet Union
- Branch: Red Army
- Awards: Order of Glory

Aleksei Leontievich Kovalev (Russian: Алексей Леонтьевич Ковалёв; born 10 May 1925 – died 7 September 1997) was a Red Army soldier who was identified as the flag holder in the Raising a Flag over the Reichstag photograph in Berlin.

== Biography ==
Aleksei Kovalev was born in the village of Burlin, Kazakh SSR, son of a farmer of Russian nationality. After high school, he worked in the kolkhoz. He was drafted into the Red Army in 1942.

=== Reichstag photograph ===
When Yevgeny Khaldei reached the Reichstag after its pacification, Khaldei found that a number of Soviet flags had already been planted there. Allegedly, when he asked who had first raised the Soviet flag over the building, the soldiers present singled out Kovalev, Abdulkhakim Ismailov, and Leonid Gorychev. Khaldei produced a flag of his own and asked the men to help him to the roof. Kovalev attached the flag used in Raising a Flag over the Reichstag.

Kovalev was demobilized in 1950 and joined the Kyiv Fire Department the next year. In 1958, he joined the Communist Party of the Soviet Union. Kovalev retired as a Lieutenant Colonel in 1988 and died on 7 September 1997 in Kyiv. He is buried in the city at the Baikove Cemetery.

== Awards and decorations ==
On 15 May 1946, Kovalev was awarded the Order of Glory, 1st Degree. He was member #1204 of the order.

== See also ==
- Ira Hayes, one of the US Marines in the photograph Raising the Flag on Iwo Jima
