= Andrianovo =

Andrianovo (Russian: Андрианово) is the name of several rural localities in Russia.

== Modern localities ==
- Andrianovo, Arkhangelsk Oblast, a village in Voznesensky Selsoviet of Primorsky District in Arkhangelsk Oblast
- Andrianovo, Kostroma Oblast, a village in Belkovskoye Settlement of Vokhomsky District in Kostroma Oblast; 58°56′N 46°33′E
- Andrianovo, Leningrad Oblast, a village under the administrative jurisdiction of Tosnenskoye Settlement Municipal Formation in Tosnensky District of Leningrad Oblast; 59°25′N 30°54′E
- Andrianovo, Nizhny Novgorod Oblast, a village in Krasnogorsky Selsoviet under the administrative jurisdiction of the town of oblast significance of Shakhunya in Nizhny Novgorod Oblast; 57°45′N 46°13′E
- Andrianovo, Kalininsky District, Tver Oblast, a village in Chernogubovskoye Rural Settlement of Kalininsky District in Tver Oblast
- Andrianovo, Kalyazinsky District, Tver Oblast, a village in Semendyayevskoye Rural Settlement of Kalyazinsky District in Tver Oblast
- Andrianovo, Torzhoksky District, Tver Oblast, a village in Klokovskoye Rural Settlement of Torzhoksky District in Tver Oblast
- Andrianovo, Zapadnodvinsky District, Tver Oblast, a village in Zapadnodvinskoye Rural Settlement of Zapadnodvinsky District in Tver Oblast
- Andrianovo, Yaroslavl Oblast, a selo in Andrianovsky Rural Okrug of Pereslavsky District in Yaroslavl Oblast

== Alternative names ==
- Andrianovo, alternative name of Andriankovo, a village under the administrative jurisdiction of the Town of Klin in Klinsky District of Moscow Oblast; 56°17′N 36°39′E

== See also ==
- Andrianov
