= Alexander Cemetery (Rostov-on-Don) =

Cemetery in Russia

Details
- Location: Rostov-on-Don
- Country: Russia
- Coordinates: 47°14′02″N 39°48′41″E
- Size: 0.03 km^{2}

The Alexander Cemetery (Russian: Александровское кладбище) is a cemetery in the city of Rostov-on-Don, Russia.

== History ==
The Alexander Cemetery is situated at Alexandrovka microdistrict of Rostov-on-Don. It has the total area of about 0.03 km^{2}. The exact date of establishment of the cemetery is unknown.

In 1970s, when the Northern Cemetery was opened, it was decided to close the Alexander Cemetery. Later, due to the critical situation with the shortage of free space in the Northern Cemetery, the Rostov-on-Don City Administration decided to allow to bury relatives of the ones already buried at the territory of the Alexander Cemetery.

== Famous people buried at the Brethren Cemetery ==
- Alexei Berest – a Soviet political officer and one of the three Red Army soldiers who hoisted the Victory Banner. There is a monument in his honor at the cemetery.
- Fyodor Chernozubov (1863–1919) – Russian Imperial Army lieutenant general.
