= Horiaistivka =

Village in Okhtyrka Raion, Sumy Oblast, Ukraine

Coordinates: 50°23′19″N 34°46′38″E

Horiaistivka (Ukrainian: Горяйстівка) is a selo (village) in Okhtyrka Raion, Sumy Oblast, Northern Ukraine, It is located on the right bank of the Oleshnia river. Horiaistivka belongs to the Chupakhivka rural hromada, one of the hromadas of Ukraine. It has a population of 174 (2001 estimate).
