= Abdulla Izhaev =

Soviet soldier

Abdulla Mahaevich Izhaev
- Абдулла Махаевич Ижаев
- Born: 1920
- Died: 1994 (aged 73–74)
- Military career
- Allegiance: USSR
- Branch: Infantry
- Service years: 1941–1946
- Rank: Sergeant
- Conflicts: World War II
- Awards: Hero of the Russian Federation

Abdulla Mahaevich Izhaev (Russian: Абдулла Махаевич Ижаев; 1920–1994) was a Karachay soldier in the Red Army during World War II. In 1995, he was posthumously awarded the title Hero of the Russian Federation; he had been nominated for the Order of Glory 1st class during the war, but did not receive it.

== Biography ==
AIzhaev was born in 1920 in Uchkulan aul, an area located within present-day Karachayevsky District of Karachay-Cherkessia.

In September 1941 he became a soldier in the Red Army. He completed courses for machine gunners and for snipers. From February 1942 he helped to produce ammunition.

He started to participate in actions in October 1942. He took part in battles of the Central Front, Bryansk Front and 1st Ukrainian Front. During the Battle of Kursk he knocked out three enemy tanks. He was badly injured twice, and at the end of the war he was in Berlin. He was awarded the Order of Glory twice, but was not awarded the Order of Glory 1st class because of his ethnicity.

In 1946 he was demobilized and deported to the Kirghiz SSR because of his Karachay ethnicity. During the Khrushchev Thaw, the Karachay people were allowed to return to their republic, so 1957 he returned his homeland, where he worked at sovkhoz "Uchkeken". He died in 1994.

== Awards ==
- Hero of the Russian Federation
- Medal "for Battle Merit"
- Order of the Patriotic War 2nd class
- Order of Glory 2nd and 3rd class
- Two Medal "for Courage"
- Campaign and jubilee medals
- By Decree of the President of the Russian Federation of September 7, 1995, for “courage and heroism displayed in the struggle against the Nazi invaders during the Great Patriotic War,” Abdullah Izhaev was posthumously awarded the high title of Hero of the Russian Federation. He was also decorated with the Order of the Patriotic War, 2nd Class; the Order of Glory, 2nd and 3rd Classes; and a number of medals.

== See also ==
- List of Heroes of the Russian Federation
