= Yevgeny Khaldei =

Soviet photojournalist (1917–1997)

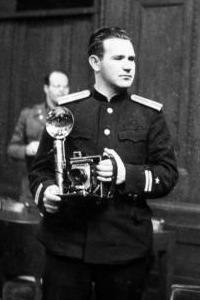
- Khaldei in 1946
- Born: 23 March [O.S. 10 March] 1917; Yuzovka, Russian Empire
- Died: 6 October 1997 (aged 80); Moscow, Russia
- Occupations: Photojournalism, war photography
- Known for: Raising a Flag over the Reichstag photograph
- Children: 2

Yevgeny Ananyevich Khaldei (Russian: Евгений Ананьевич Халдей; Ukrainian: Євген Ананійович Халдей, romanized: Yevhen Ananiyovych Khaldey; 23 March [O.S. 10 March] 1917 – 6 October 1997) was a Soviet naval officer and photographer. He is best known for his World War II photograph of a Soviet soldier raising a flag over the Reichstag in Berlin, the capital of the vanquished Nazi Germany, at the end of the war.

== Life ==
Khaldei was born to a Jewish family in Yuzovka and was obsessed with photography since childhood, having built his first childhood camera with his grandmother's eyeglasses. In March 1918, when Khaldei was one year old, his mother was killed during one of the pogroms of the Russian Civil War, by followers of the White movement. The bullet passed through her body and greatly wounded Yevgeny, who survived his injuries.

He started working with the Soviet press agency TASS on 25th of October, 1936 (at the age of 19), as a photographer. His father and three of his four sisters were murdered by the Nazis during the war. He also witnessed the aftermath of the massacre of 7,000 civilians in Kerch in 1942. During the march to Berlin with the advancing Red Army, Khaldei experienced the liberation of Romania, Bulgaria, and Hungary, and the capture of Vienna.

Khaldei may have joined the Navy as Technician-Intendant 1st class, though the TASS news agency obtained for him an honorary rank of navy lieutenant which allowed him freedom of movement to record military personnel and battles. In 1945, Khaldei persuaded his uncle to create a large Soviet flag after seeing Joe Rosenthal's photo of the flag raising at Iwo Jima while the Soviet army closed in on Berlin and took it with him to Berlin for the Reichstag shot. He later took photographs of the Nazis at the Nuremberg trials and of the Red Army during its offensive in Japanese Manchuria.

Khaldei continued to work in photojournalism after the war as a TASS staff photographer, but was reprimanded in a 1947 evaluation: "After returning to peacetime conditions, he failed to develop himself at all, and at the present moment he is considered a passable photojournalist ... The reasons for this are several. First, all the praise that was heaped upon him as a military photojournalist finally went to his head, and he rested on his laurels. His growth as a photojournalist stopped. The other reason has to do with Khaldei's cultural level, which is exceptionally low." In October 1948, Khaldei received notice that he was being let go because of the agency's "staff downsizing".

Khaldei continued to photograph, now working as a freelance photographer for Soviet newspapers, and focused on capturing the scenes of everyday life. In 1959, he got a job again at the newspaper Pravda, where he worked until he was forced to retire in 1970. Khaldei's wartime photographs were collected in a 93-page book, Ot Murmanska do Berlina (From Murmansk to Berlin), published in 1984. His work continues to be distributed through the Sovfoto agency which has operated in the West since 1932. Khaldei's international fame dates from the 1990s, when exhibitions of his photographs began to be held in the West.

== Works ==
Khaldei's most renowned photographs were taken when he was a Red Army photographer from 1941 to 1946. Khaldei's photographs emphasised his feelings for the historic moments and his sense of humour. One of the more famous anecdotes was during the Nuremberg Trials, where Hermann Göring was being tried.

While Khaldei frequently staged or manipulated his photographs, he insisted that this was to signify the importance and add strength to a particular event. His work was also admired by the elites of the Soviet Union and he is renowned for creating commissioned portraits for State leaders such as Joseph Stalin, Mikhail Gorbachev and Boris Yeltsin.

=== Red Army Reichstag photo ===
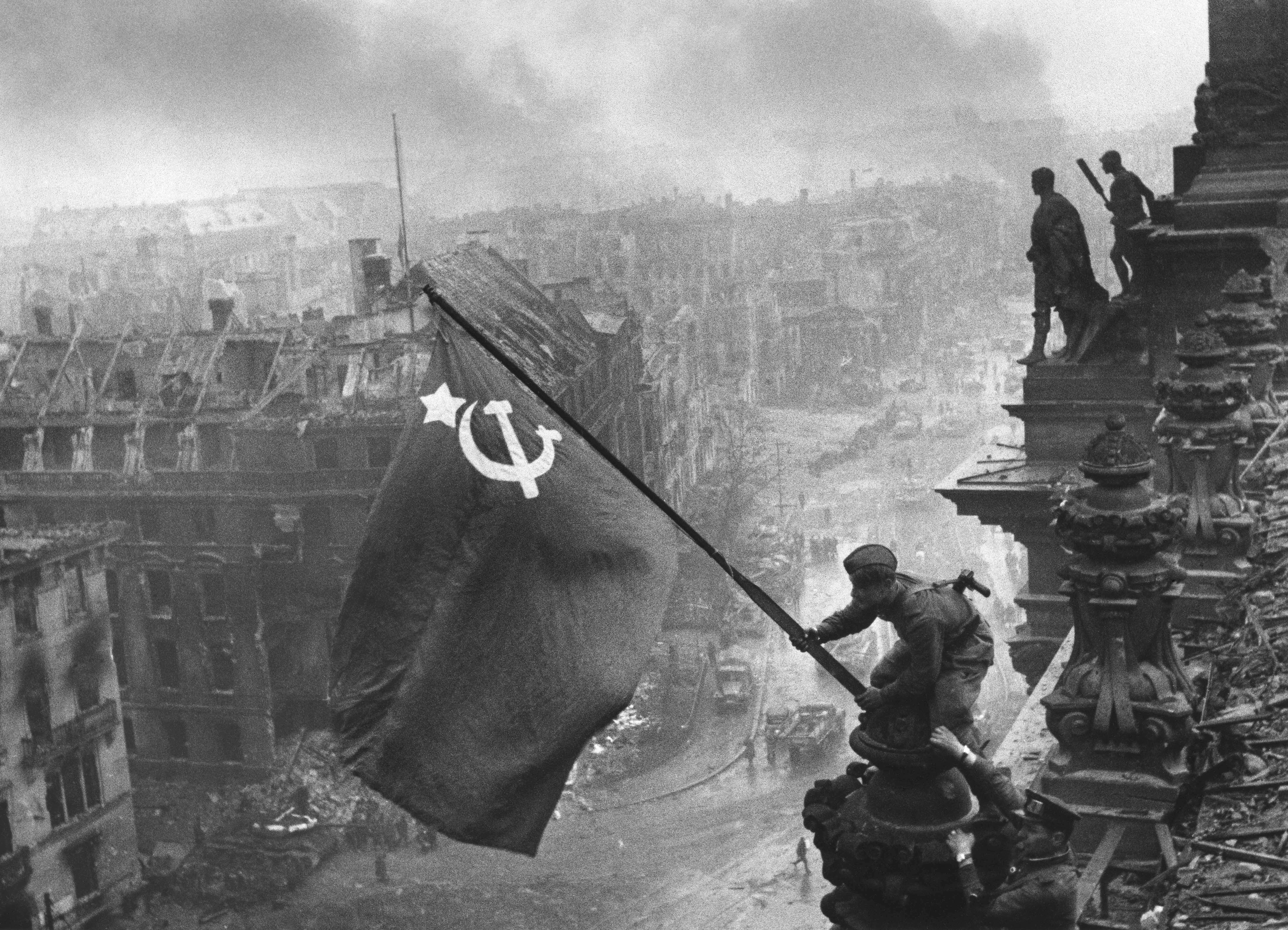
Raising a flag over the Reichstag

Khaldei's most famous photo was of a Red Army soldier raising a Soviet flag above the German Reichstag at the end of World War II: the historic defeat of Nazi Germany in a war that cost the Soviet Union twenty million lives; the magazine Ogoniok published the photograph on 13 May 1945. Khaldei had shot an entire roll of film, 36 images. One shot, along with some of its very similar versions, became the most iconic of the event (The Times identified one such version). When Khaldei arrived at the Reichstag, he simply asked the soldiers who happened to be passing by to help with the staging of the photoshoot; the one who was attaching the flag was 18-year-old Private Aleksei Kovalev from Kiev, the two others were Abdulkhakim Ismailov from Dagestan and Leonid Gorychev (also mentioned as Aleksei Goryachev) from Minsk. The photograph was taken with a Leica III rangefinder camera with a 35mm f3.5 lens.

The celebrated image is a re-enactment of an earlier flag-raising of which no photograph was taken, as it happened at 10:40 p.m. on 30 April 1945 while the building was actually still held by German troops. A group of four Soviet soldiers fought their way to the roof, where 23-year-old private Mikhail Minin climbed up on an equestrian statue representing Germany, to fasten an improvised flagpole to its crown. As that occurred at night and under fire, no photo could be taken. The next day German snipers shot down the flag. The surrender of the Reichstag came on 2 May 1945, and only after that did Khaldei scale the building along with the three soldiers which he had picked up randomly on his way. He was carrying with him a large flag sewn from a red tablecloth by his Jewish friend in Moscow for this very purpose. The seams are indeed visible on the picture.

=== Copyrights ===
Because Khaldei worked in TASS from 25 October 1936 to 7 October 1948, his TASS photoworks entered the public domain in Russia no later than 1 January 2019, because they were copyrighted by TASS, and such copyrights of a legal entity expire no later than 70 years after publication (or creation, if work was not published in proper time). It was confirmed in 2015 in the litigation between the heiress of the photographer, his daughter Anna Khaldei and the publishing house «Veche» about the use of the photograph "Raising a Flag over the Reichstag" in the book "Za porogom Pobedy" (Russian: За порогом Победы, Behind the Threshold of the Victory) by Arsen Benikovich Martirosyan, where ITAR-TASS was included as a third party without a separate interest.

== Honours and awards ==
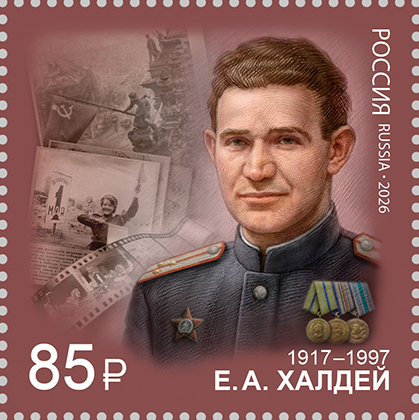
Khaldei on a 2026 stamp of Russia

- Order of the Patriotic War 2nd class
- Order of the Red Star
- Medal "For the Defence of Sevastopol"
- Medal "For the Defence of the Caucasus"
- Medal "For the Defence of the Soviet Transarctic"
- Medal "For the Victory over Germany in the Great Patriotic War 1941–1945"
- Medal "For the Victory over Japan"
- Medal "For the Capture of Berlin"
- Medal "For the Capture of Vienna"
- Medal "For the Capture of Königsberg"
- Medal "For the Capture of Budapest"
