= Anatoli Ivanov (musician) =

Russian composer (1934–2012)

Anatoli Vasilyevich Ivanov
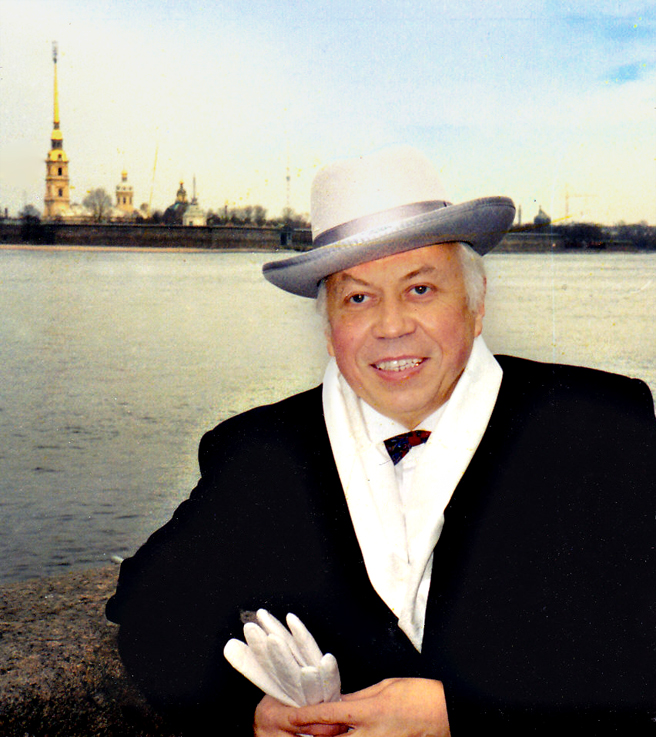
- Born: 26 June 1934; Leningrad, RSFSR, USSR.
- Died: 2 April 2012 (aged 77); Vienna, Austria.
- Resting place: Vienna Central Cemetery; 48°09′13″N 16°26′40″E
- Occupations: Musician, timpanist, composer, conductor, music teacher
- Years active: 1952–2012
- Awards: People's Artist of the Russian Federation (1997)

Anatoli Vasilyevich Ivanov (Russian: Анато́лий Васи́льевич Ивано́в; 26 June 1934 – 2 April 2012) was a Russian solo-timpanist, percussionist with the Saint Petersburg Philharmonic Orchestra, book author and People's Artist of Russia (1997). President of the Russian Association of Percussion Performers, member of the Percussive Arts Society, conductor, member of the Russian Authors Society. He taught at the Leningrad Conservatory. A tribute concert was held at Mariinsky Theatre on 12 April 2016.
