= Anatoli Ivanov (footballer, born 1972) =

Russian footballer (born 1972)

Personal information
- Full name: Anatoli Viktorovich Ivanov
- Date of birth: 20 March 1972 (age 54)
- Place of birth: Pskov, Russian SFSR
- Height: 1.93 m (6 ft 4 in)
- Position: Goalkeeper

Senior career*
Years	Team	Apps	(Gls)
1993–1996	FC Zvezda Irkutsk	100	(0)
1997	FC Metallurg Lipetsk	12	(0)
1997	FC Lada-Togliatti-VAZ Togliatti	15	(0)
1998	FC Gazovik-Gazprom Izhevsk	23	(0)
1999–2000	FC Metallurg Lipetsk	45	(0)
2001	FC Khimki	3	(0)
2002	FC Zvezda Irkutsk	4	(0)
2003	FC Dynamo Stavropol	2	(0)
2004–2006	FC Pskov-747	32	(0)
2006–2007	FC Dynamo Saint Petersburg	32	(0)
2008	FC Pskov-747	16	(0)
2009–2013	FC Pskov-747	3	(0)
2014	FC Pskov-747	0	(0)
- * Club domestic league appearances and goals

Anatoli Viktorovich Ivanov (Russian: Анатолий Викторович Иванов; born 20 March 1972) is a Russian footballer.

== Club career ==
He played nine seasons in the Russian Football National League for 5 different teams.
