= Aksay, Republic of Dagestan =

Aksay Аксай Яхсай
- Selo
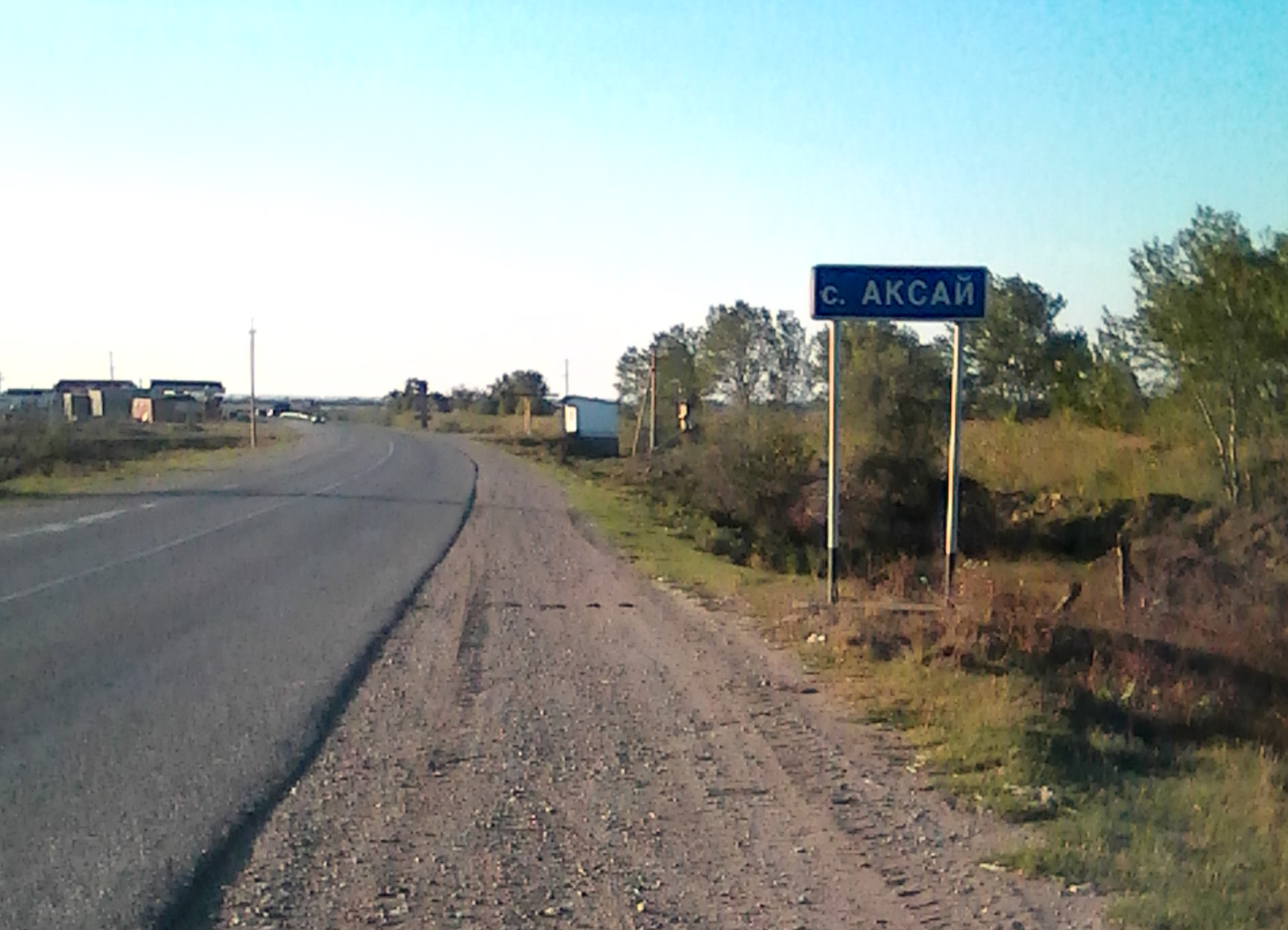

- Location within Republic of Dagestan Location within Russia
- Coordinates: 43°22′N 46°26′E
- Country: Russia
- Region: Republic of Dagestan
- District: Khasavyurtovsky District
- Time zone: UTC+3:00

Aksay (Russian: Аксай; Kumyk: Яхсай, Yaxsay) is a rural locality (a selo) in Khasavyurtovsky District, Republic of Dagestan, Russia. Population: 11,380 (2021 census); 8,336 (2002 census); 6,518 (1989 Soviet census). There are 88 streets. Aksay is located on both sides of the Aksay river.

== Geography ==
Aksay is located 21 km northwest of Khasavyurt (the district's administrative centre) by road. Adzhimazhagatyurt is the nearest rural locality.
