= Andrin =

Andrin (Russian: А́ндрин; masculine) or Andrina (А́ндрина; feminine) is a Russian last name. It can be either a variant of the last name Adrianov, or be derived from the Christian first names Andrey and Andronik.

The last name also exists in other languages where it is not necessarily related to the Russian last name.

== People with the last name ==
- Alain Andrin, French cyclist who participated in the 1913 Tour de France
- Frank Andrina, one of the animators of The New Fred and Barney Show, a 1979 revival of The Flintstones
- Ingrīda Andriņa, Latvian actress starring in the 1979 Soviet police movie Nezakonchennyy uzhin

== Toponyms ==
- Andrina, alternative name of Andriny, a village in Sudayskoye Settlement of Chukhlomsky District in Kostroma Oblast, Russia; 58°56′N 43°06′E
