= Chagarotar =

Chagarotar Чагаротар ЧагӀаротар
- Selo
- Location within Republic of Dagestan Location within Russia
- Coordinates: 43°28′N 46°32′E
- Country: Russia
- Region: Republic of Dagestan
- District: Khasavyurtovsky District
- Time zone: UTC+3:00

Chagarotar (Russian: Чагаротар; Chechen: ЧагӀаротар, Çaġarotar) is a rural locality (a selo) in Khasavyurtovsky District, Republic of Dagestan, Russia. Population: 2,041 (2021 census); 1,620 (2002 census); 1,290 (1989 Soviet census). There are 20 streets.

== Geography ==
Chagarotar is located 40 km north of Khasavyurt (the district's administrative centre) by road. Novogagatli is the nearest rural locality.
