= Adrianov compass =

Russian military compass

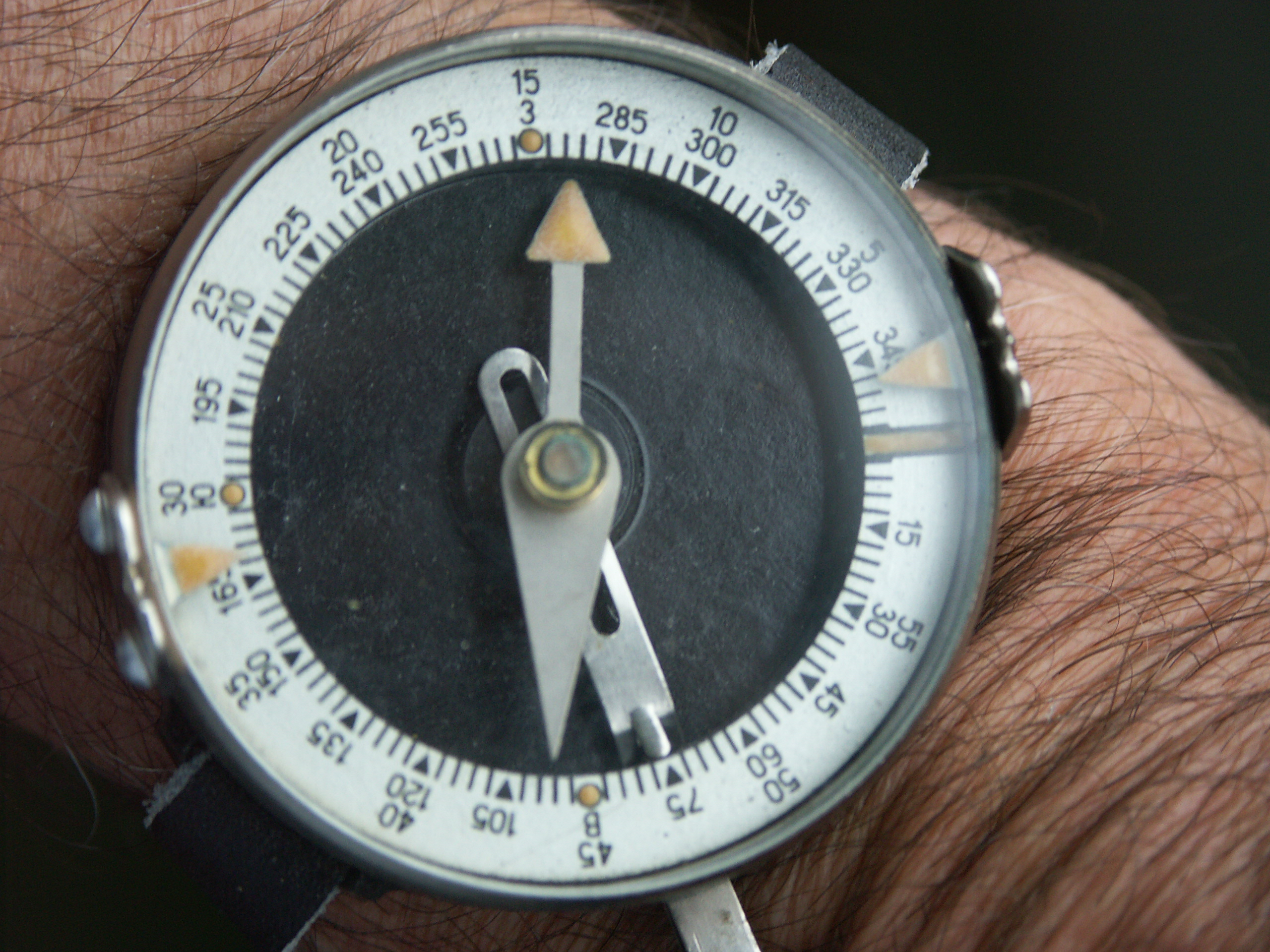
An older model Adrianov compass, differentiated by the brownish color of its glow-in-the-dark markings

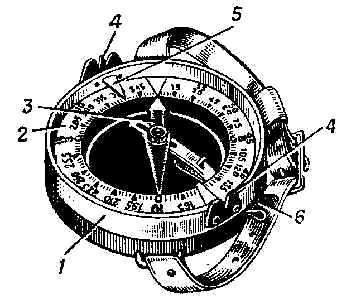
Adrianov compass in details: 1) Compass case; 2) Scale; 3) Magnetic pointer; 4) Sight point; 5) Counter point; 6) Pointer stopper

The Adrianov compass (Russian: Компас Адрианова) is a military compass designed by Russian Imperial Army topographist Vladimir Adrianov in 1907. Wrist-worn versions of the compass were then adopted and widely used by the Red and Soviet Army. Some of the older production examples are slightly radioactive because of Radium-226 used in their dials. Newer ones, with teal or white paint color, use the non-radioactive phosphorescent paint.
