= Meliton Kantaria =

Soviet Georgian sergeant (1920–1993)

- მელიტონ ვარლამის ძე ქანთარია
- Kantaria in 1945
- Born: 5 October 1920; Jvari, Zugdidi uezd, Kutaisi Governorate, Georgia
- Died: 27 December 1993 (aged 73); Moscow, Russia
- Military career
- Allegiance: Soviet Union
- Branch: Red Army
- Service years: 1940–1946
- Rank: Junior sergeant
- Unit: 150th Rifle Division
- Conflicts: World War II
- Awards: Hero of the Soviet Union

Meliton Varlamis dze Kantaria or Kantariya (Georgian: მელიტონ ქანთარია; Russian: Мелитон Варламович Кантария, romanized: Meliton Varlamovich Kantariya; 5 October 1920 – 27 December 1993) was a sergeant of the Soviet Army credited with having hoisted the Victory Banner over the Reichstag on 1 May 1945, together with Mikhail Yegorov and Alexei Berest.

== Biography ==
Born to a peasant family in a small Georgian town of Jvari, he worked in a kolkhoz until being mobilized in the Red Army in 1940. During World War II, he served in the 756th Rifle Regiment, 150th Rifle Division, of the 3rd Shock Army at the 1st Belorussian Front. He is credited for having mounted a red banner, together with Sergeant Mikhail Yegorov, over the Reichstag on 2 May 1945.

=== Post-war ===
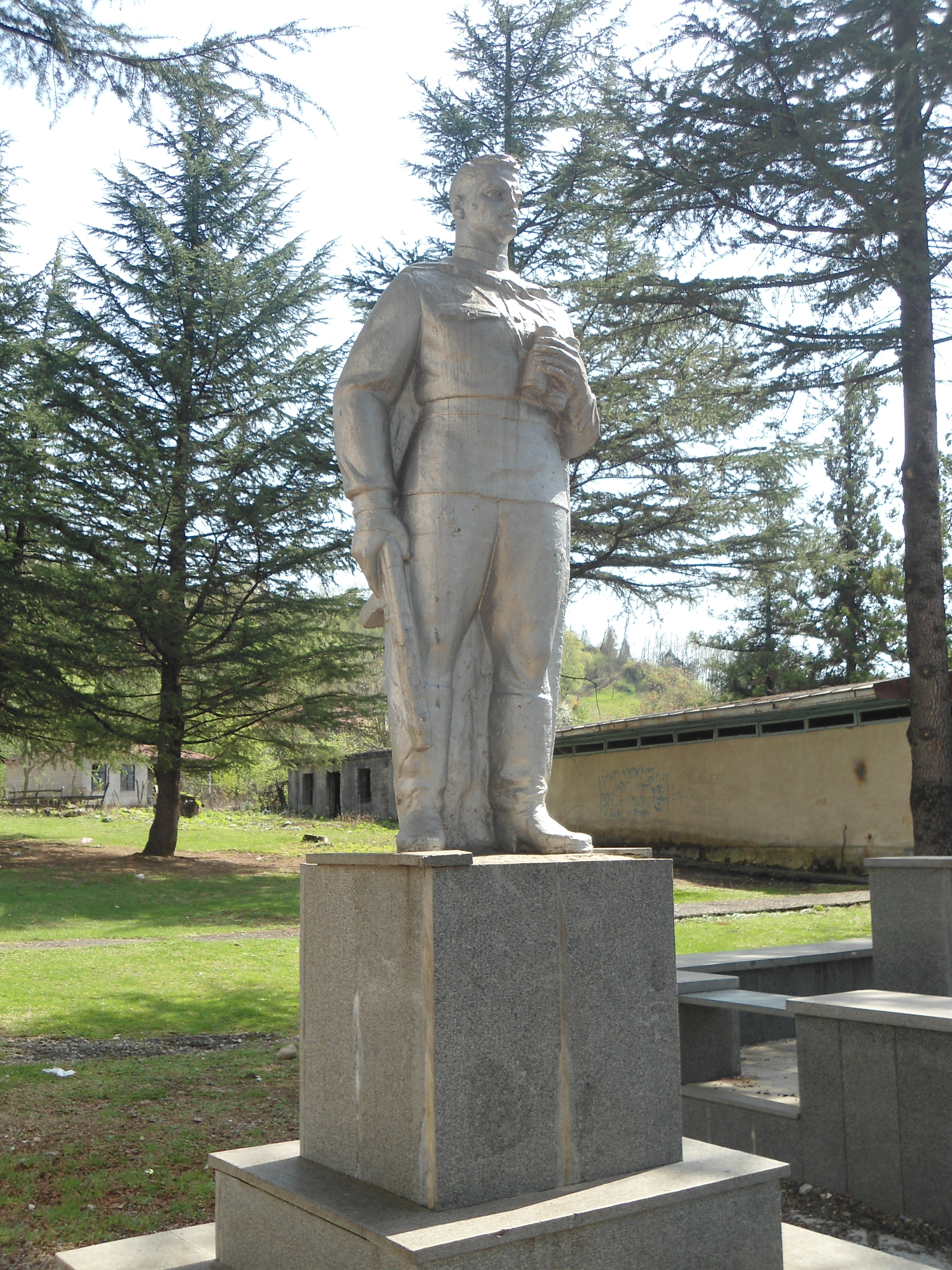
A statue of Kantaria at the school with his namesake in 2013.

Demobilized in 1946, he lived thereafter in Sukhumi working as a governmental shop manager. He joined the Communist Party of the Soviet Union in 1947. He lived in the city of Ochamchire, and later became a deputy of the Supreme Soviet of the Georgian SSR. In 1965, together with Yegorov and Konstantin Samsonov, he carried the Victory Banner at the Moscow Victory Day Parade on Red Square. In the same formation, they carried the banner at the International Workers' Day demonstration in 1970. A year after the secessionist war in Abkhazia started, during which Kantaria's house in Ochamchire was destroyed, he moved with his family to Moscow, where he died two months later in December 1993 in a Moscow hospital. In early January 1994, Kantaria was reburied in his native town Jvari, on the grounds of School #3.

== Legacy ==
In 2010 on Poklonnaya Hill, a memorial was opened dedicated to Yegorov and Kantaria. Modern day Georgia holds Kantaria in high historical regard, being one of few whose Soviet era legacy was rehabilitated. Since 2011, the school where he has been buried has been named after Kantaria. It was renamed by President of Georgia Mikhail Saakashvili during that year's Victory Day celebrations, during which he noted that Kantaria "is probably the most classic example of the tragic fate of our people, since he ended his life as a refugee". A bust of Kantaria was unveiled installed in Tbilisi's Kikvidze Park at the initiative of the veteran organization "Heirs of Victory" in 2016.

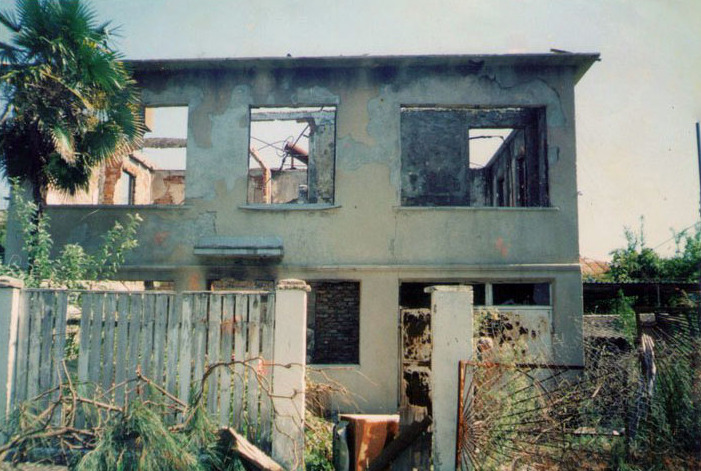
Kantaria's home in Ochamchire, which was destroyed during the fighting.

== Honours and awards ==
- Hero of the Soviet Union (1946)
- Order of Lenin
- Order of the Red Banner
- Order of the Patriotic War, 1st class
- campaign and jubilee medals

He was an Honorary Citizen of Berlin from 8 May 1965 to 29 September 1992.

== See also ==
- Raising the Flag on Iwo Jima
- Mikhail Minin - according to later researches, the first flag raiser over the Reichstag
