= Mikhail Minin =

Russian Soviet soldier (1922–2008)

- Михаил Минин
- Born: 29 July 1922; Vanino, Palkinsky District
- Died: 10 January 2008 (aged 85); Pskov, Russia
- Burial place: Pskov
- Alma mater: Military Engineering Academy
- Military career
- Allegiance: Soviet Union
- Branch: Red Army
- Service years: 1941–1977
- Rank: Lieutenant colonel
- Unit: 3rd Shock Army
- Conflicts: World War II
- Awards: Hero of the Soviet Union

Mikhail Petrovich Minin (Russian: Михаил Петрович Минин; 29 July 1922 – 10 January 2008) was among the first Soviet soldiers to enter the Reichstag building on 30 April 1945, during the Battle of Berlin, along with Raqymjan Qoshqarbaev and others. He was born in Palkinsky District.

The iconic picture Raising a Flag over the Reichstag showing a Georgian soldier, Meliton Kantaria, fixing a pole with the hammer-and-sickle flag on the Reichstag roof was shot two days later, on 2 May 1945. The night that the Reichstag was taken by Minin's platoon there was no photographer available.

Mikhail Minin was born in 1922 in the village of Vanino, in western Russia's Pskov Oblast. In June 1941 he volunteered to join the Red Army to fight against Nazi Germany. He took part in battles to end the Leningrad blockade and made his way across the fronts from Leningrad to Berlin.

== The Battle of Berlin ==
Joseph Stalin had urged his troops to mount the flag on the Reichstag building no later than 1 May 1945. Minin's superiors had told the soldiers that any piece of red cloth fixed to the building would symbolize that the battle was won.

Minin recalled in a recent interview in a German documentary, the "War of the Century", that by the time the building needed to be stormed, morale among the victorious Soviet soldiers was low. They knew the building could only be taken on foot and it was still heavily defended. So his commanders decided to launch a night attack and Minin was put in charge of the platoon.

"Nobody really wanted to die that night because the war was already won," he declared. "Even a promise by our officers that those who captured the building would get the highest decoration of Hero of the Soviet Union called forth few volunteers. Except for my little company." The four men, G. Zagitov, A. Lisimenko, A. Bobrov, and M. Minin, made their way towards the Reichstag they were met by heavy fire.

Minin later reported

Running in front was Giya Zagitov, who had a flashlight with him. That flashlight helped us to pass through the damaged stairs. All the corridors linked to the stairs were cleared by grenades and long submachine gun bursts.

Right before reaching the attic I tore a one and half meter pipe off the wall to serve as a flagpole. After reaching the spacious attic, we faced the problem of getting to the roof. Again G. Zagitov found a solution – with his flashlight he noticed in the darkness a heavy winch and two chains going to the top. We climbed the chains and then through a tiny window got out to the roof somewhere on the western side of the building. There near a barely noticeable column Zagitov and I began setting up our Red Banner. Suddenly an explosion lighted up the roof and Lisimenko found our old reference-point – a sculpture of a bronze horse and a large woman in a crown. It was immediately decided to set the banner on the sculpture.

The guys raised me onto the horse’s back which shook from the explosions, and then I fixed the banner right in the crown of the bronze giantess.

We checked the time. It was 22:40 local time.

Minin was recognized for his feat, but was not rewarded as one would expect: even though the brigade's commanders requested that all soldiers in Minin's platoon be awarded the Hero of Soviet Union decoration, they only received a lower-ranking decoration, the Order of the Red Banner. As there were no photos taken when the flag was put on the roof on 10 p.m., other photos were taken afterwards to recreate the event for the camera.

The details were documented in part 19/19 of a German documentary from 2004 called The War of the Century. The documentary includes Minin revisiting the Reichstag and meeting a German soldier who was hiding inside.

== Recognition ==
Following the end of World War II, Minin continued his army service. In 1959 he graduated from the Kuibyshev Military Engineering Academy in Moscow and joined Strategic Rocket Forces. He retired from the military in 1969 as a lieutenant colonel.

He moved to Pskov in 1977 and decided to stay in the city afterwards. Minin had to wait five decades for a greater recognition, finally granted to him with an official honour by President Boris Yeltsin, on the 50th anniversary of the end of the Second World War. Minin died on 10 January 2008, and was buried in his native city of Pskov on 12 January 2008.

=== Awards ===
- Order of the Red Banner
- Order of the Patriotic War
- Order of the Red Star
- Medal "For Battle Merit"
- Medal "For the Victory over Germany in the Great Patriotic War 1941–1945"
- Medal "For the Capture of Berlin"
- Medal "For the Liberation of Warsaw"
